= Yakshagana bells =

Type of finger bell

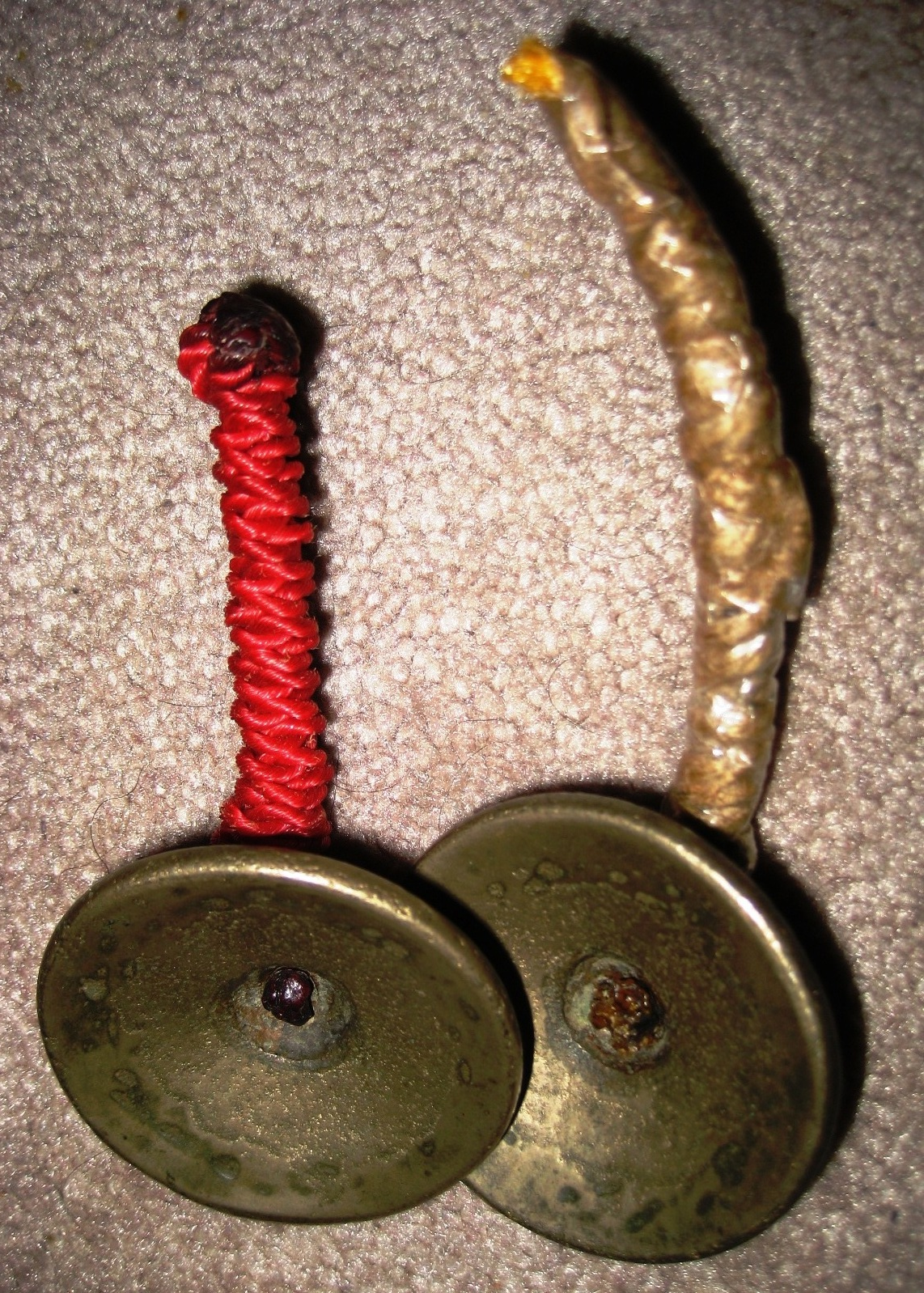
Yakshagana cymbal.

The Yakshagana bells (Kannada: ಯಕ್ಷಗಾನ ತಾಳಗಳು) or Yakshagana cymbal are a pair of finger bells made of a special alloy (traditional five metal) used in Yakshagana (Badagu Thittu). They are used by the singer to keep the tempo and rhythm of Yakshagana performances. The pitch of the bells are generally very high and do not match the pitch of the singer; as such, singers may use bells of any key.

== Methods of use ==
The player of the Yakshagana bells holds the thread tied to the bells and hits the edge of one bell to the face of the other bell. There are various techniques that may be used to produce different sounds from the instrument. For fast rhythms, the non-dominant hand is rolled to facilitate fast beating. A closed hit of the bells produces a sound without any overtone and with sudden decay. This stroke indicates a gap (husi) and is often used to indicate change in rhythm or tempo to other musicians.

== See also ==
- Tabla
- Thavil
- Karatalas
- Chande
- Tala-Maddale
