= Bayalaata =

Form of Yakshagana

Bayalāṭa (Kannada: ಬಯಲಾಟ, or Bayalāṭada ಬಯಲಾಟದ) is a generic term for all open air theatre form, including form of Yakshagana found in southern Indian region of Karnataka. It features stories from Indian epic poetry and the Puranas rendered as dance and drama. Bayalāṭa means open theater drama and marks the end of harvest season The most popular theme for bayalāṭa is the story of Kōṭi and Cennayya, which has deep-rooted significance for the people of Tulu Nadu. There are generally five types of Bayalayas – Dasarat, Sannata, Doddata, Parikatha, and Yakshanaga. Parijat and Yakshagana are narrated by single sutradhar while other three forms are performed in chorus of three-four, aided by Vidhushaka.

The Yakshagana stage is set before the village temple on a sandy beach or in open fields. A low platform about 16' 10 20' with bamboo poles at each corner garlanded with flowers, plantain and mango leaves, and roofed with matted palm leaves. At sunset the sound of a chande, a high pitched drum, announces forthcoming performances.
