= Yakshagana Tala =

Yakshagana Tala (Kannada:ಯಕ್ಷಗಾನ ತಾಳ, pronounced as yaksha-gaana taala), is a rhythmical pattern in Yakshagana that is determined by a composition called Yakshagana Padya. Tala also decides how a composition is enacted by dancers. It is similar to Tala in other forms of Indian music, but is structurally different from them. Each composition is set to one or more talas, and as a composition is rendered by Himmela, the percussion artist(s) play supporting the dance performance. Tala is maintained by the singer using a pair of finger bells.

The instrument for rhythm in Yakshagana are the Chande, Maddale and a Yakshagana Tala (bell) is also used along with chande.

Yakshagana has a complete and complex system for rhythms. The most common Talas in Yakshagana are Matte, Eaka, Udaape, Jampe, Rupaka, Trivde, Atta, KorE and Aadi. Each tala has a cycle of N beats divided in M bars. Some talas are more than 5 minutes long (e.g. Abbara Tala). Note that although, the names of Talas are similar to Karnataka Sangeetha only a few talas are similar and other rhythms are completely different. Each taal is identified by a typical set of syllables similar to bols in Tabla. A set of syllables representing the basic rhythm of taala is called 'Badtige' or 'Tatkaara'. The variations of a particular taala are called 'Nade' (movement) which is similar to Kaida in Tabla.

Yakshagana music vocalists (Bhagavathas) mark the tala by tapping a pair of bells. Talas are identified by Ghaatha and are largely decided by the metre of the Yakshagana poetry Some Taalas have been demonstrated on chande in the following external links.

== Some Yakshagana Talas ==
- Matte Tala (Tvarita Rupaka): 3 beats

----3---|-------3------||----3---|-------3------||
tai ta | di naam || tai ta | di naam ||

Muktaya (Ending)

- Chaurastra Eka Tala: 4 beats

ta ddi mi | ta ka di mi ||

Muktaya (Ending)

- Udaape Tala: (Tvarita Eka)

ta ki ta | ta ka di na | ta kki ta | ta ka di na ||

Muktaya (Ending)

- Jampe Tala: 5 beats

dhim kadthka dhim dhim kadthka |

Muktaya (Ending)
ta ta kadthka takada taddinnaka tai |
ta ka ta di gina dhem |

Tvarita (Fast)
Nade (Variations)

- Chaurastra Rupaka Tala: 6 beats

tai ta dinaka | dhem ta dinaka |

Muktaya (Ending)

- Trivde Tala: 7 beats

deem ta | taam di na | dheem ta | taam dina ||

- Asta Tala: 3+1/2 beats

tai ti tti | tai ti tti ||

Muktaya (Ending)

- KorE Tala: 3+1/2 beats

ti tti tai | ti tti tai ||

Muktaya (Ending)

- Aadi Tala: 16 beats

ta hasta | dim da di ku ta ka | taa tom | ta di naka ||

Muktaya (Ending)

- Chau Tala 8 beats

deem ta tta ta tta | deem ta tta | deem ta tta ta tta ||

Muktaya (Ending)

- Dhruva Tala: 14 beats (Cognate of Hindustani Rupak)

tom dinna ta ri ki ta | tom di na | tom ta tta ||
dhi dhi na | dhi na dhi na | ta di na ti na ti na ||

Muktaya (Ending)

Scholars have disagreement on the names and beat structure of the above Talas. But the details provided here are generally acceptable.

== History ==
The talas predate Karnataka Sangeetha talas. It is generally agreed that the rhythm patterns that form a basis for Karnataka Sangeetha also forms a basis for yakshagana Talas. In fact it is believed that Yakshagana uses pre classical patterns guided by the metres of the Yakshagana Poetry. A folk flavour added to these talas make them very popular among the followers.

== Literature ==
Sediyaapu, Krishna Bhatta, Chandogathi. Sediyaapu, Krishna Bhatta, Kannada Chandassu.

Uppuru, Bhagavatha Narayanappa, Yakshagana Adhyayana.

Hostota, Manjunatha Bhagavatha, Yakshagana Talasutra.

Uppuru, Prof. Sridhara, Yakshagana and Nataka.

== Other Indian Rhythmic techniques ==
Tihai
