= Maddale =

Unpitched percussion instrument

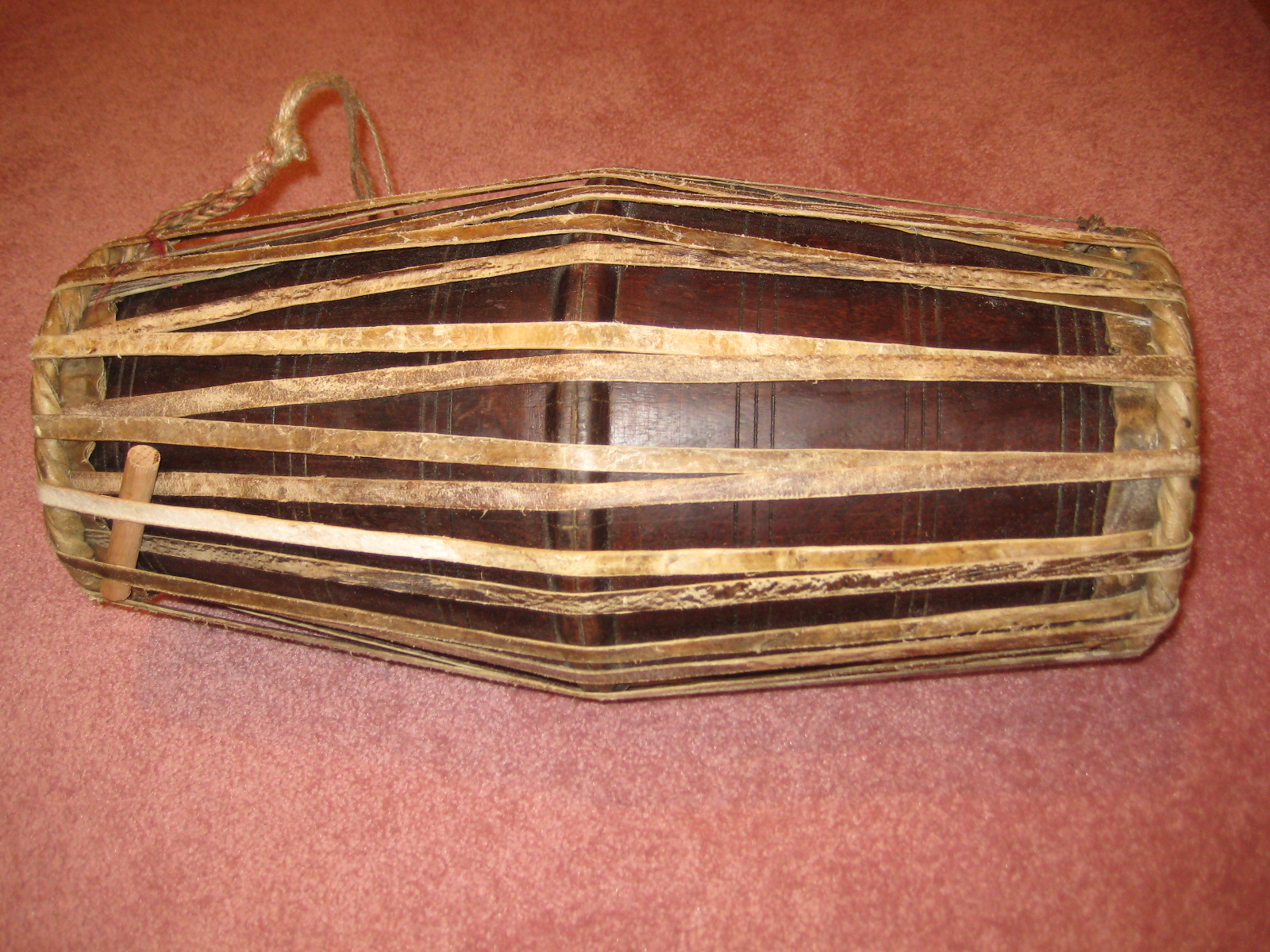
Yakshagana Maddale.

The Maddale (Kannada: ಮದ್ದಲೆ), also known as Mrudanga (ಮೃದಂಗ) in North Canara, is a percussion instrument from Karnataka, India. It serves as the primary rhythmic accompaniment in a Yakshagana ensemble, along with Chande. The maddale produces a perfectly harmonic tonic (shruti swara) when struck anywhere on its surface. This is in contrast to other instruments such as the Mrudangam, Pakawaj, or Tabla, which cannot produce the tonic (shruti) on all parts of their surfaces. Its drum head is similar to that of the tabla and its body is similar to that of the pakhavaj.

The traditional Maddale was 30 cm long and had an 8-inch drum head on the right side that produced a louder sound. Nowadays, a 6-6.5 inch wide right side Maddale is typically used, while a few using a 7-inch wide one. The left bass side is about one inch bigger than the right. The Maddale is available in more than three variants. The Maddale used in Yakshagana looks similar to the mridangam, but differs significantly in structure, acoustics, playing techniques, and rhythm system (Yakshagana Tala).

Its body is constructed from jackfruit tree wood among other woods such as kakke, baine, and hunaalu.

== History ==
The Maddale belongs to the mridangam family and shares a similar history. Over time, the Maddale evolved to be made of different kinds of wood for higher octaves.

It evolved with the development of Yakshagana and Yakshaganic fingering and hand techniques. The use of palm produces a sound that is somewhat a mixture of pakhawaj and mridangam.

== Construction ==
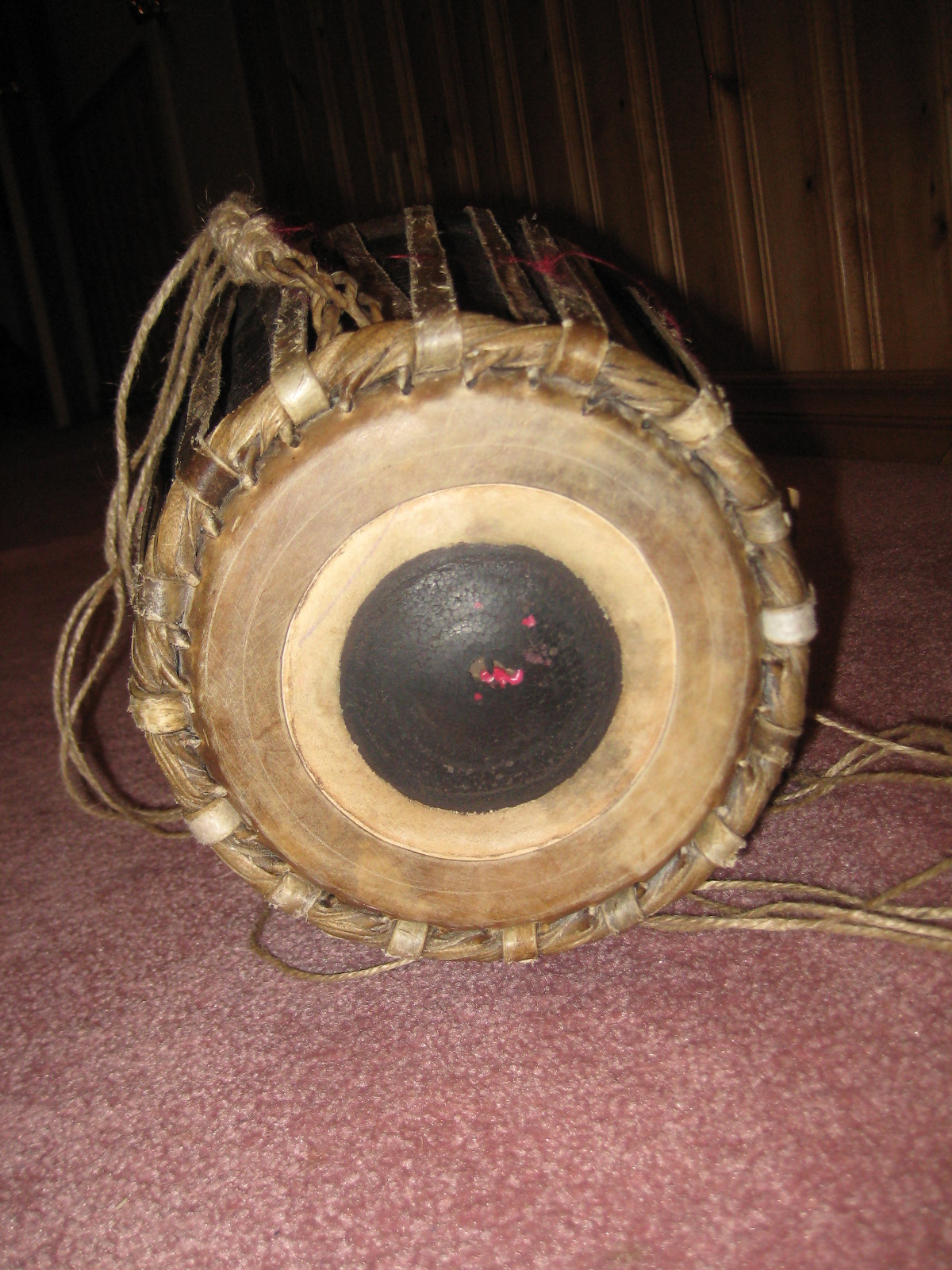
Yakshagana Maddale Bala Muchchige.

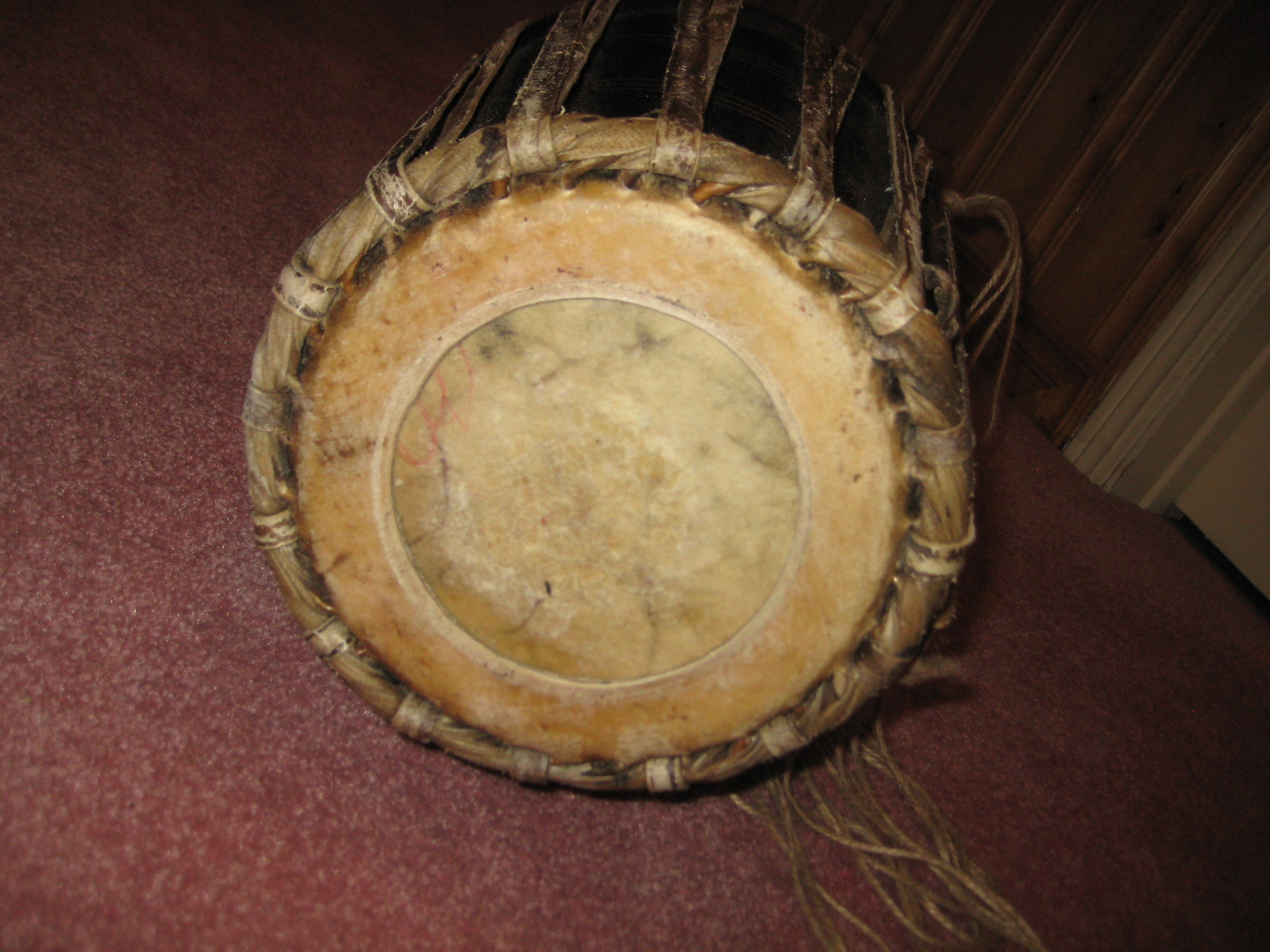
Yakshagana Maddale left drum head (bass). Left side is slightly larger

The maddale is a double-sided drum whose body is usually made using a hollowed piece of jackfruit wood about .5 cm thick (thinner than mrudangam). This body is called goodu (or housing). The two open ends of the drum are covered with goat skin leather and laced to each other with leather straps around the circumference of the drum. These straps are stretched to tightly hold the drum heads, allowing them to resonate when struck. The drum head on the left is slightly larger (bass side) (.9 inches). One side produces bass, the other treble. The drum head is known as muchchige.

The bass drum head is known as the eda muchchige and the other head is known as the bala muchchige. The higher drum head is similar to tabla drum head but creates a major tonal difference. The maddale produces tonic when playing on the rim and on ink. The higher drum head has a circular disk in the centre called karne (the ink) causing it to produce harmonic tones. The base drum is smeared with a tuning paste made from ash and rice called bona, before performances to dampen the tone and to produce bass sound.

== Methods of use ==
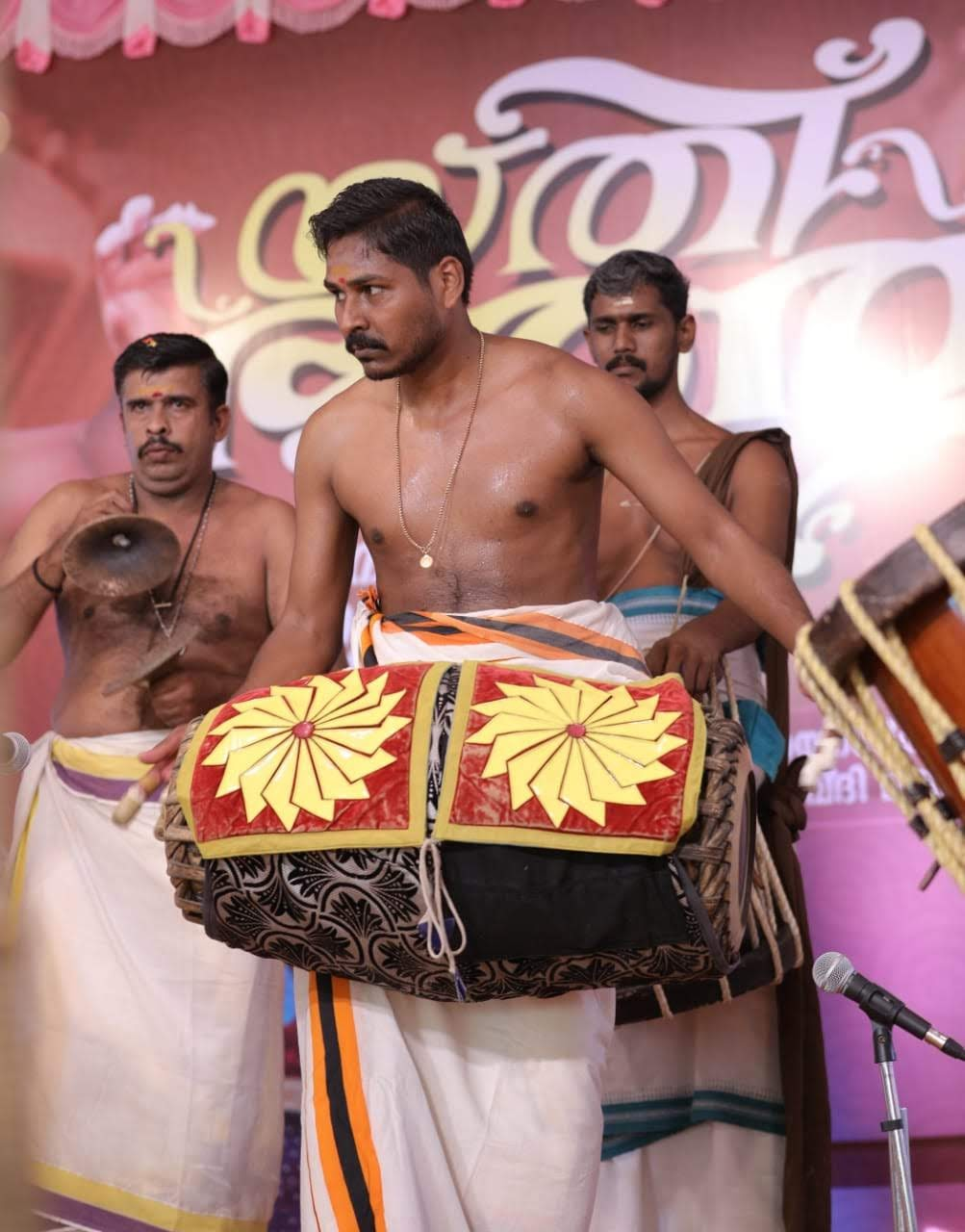
A maddale player

Maddale is tuned to the tonic of the Yakshagana singer before the performance (lower shadja). A wooden peg is sometimes used to tighten the straps. The two major strokes are gumpu and chapu. Chapu involves playing on the rim and is used for tuning. Gumpu involves playing on the ink to produce a more resonating sound. The Kapala stroke is a cross finger stroke above the ink. It is a unique stroke that produces a harmonic mix of gumpu and chapu (Kapala is more musical than chapu of mrudangam).

== See also ==
- Tabla
- Thavil
- Karatalas
- Chande
- Tala-Maddale
- Mridanga
