= Kogga Devanna Kamath =

- Born: 27 November 1921
- Died: 27 August 2003 (aged 81); Uppinakudru, Udupi district, Karnataka
- Occupation: puppeteer

Kogga Devanna Kamath (27 November 1921 – 27 August 2003) was an Indian artist who specialised in Yakshagana puppetry.

== Early life and education ==
Kogga Devanna Kamath was born on 27 November 1921 He learned the art of puppetry from his father, Devanna Kamath (1888–1971), who was the only puppetry artist of the area and had received the President Award for puppetry in 1966. Kogga Kamath had determined to give up the art due to lack of patronage but was encouraged to continue by Kamaladevi Chattopadhyay and K. Sanjeeva Prabhu. His family members supported his effort and he received further encouragement from Shivarama Karanth, a writer, art promoter and researcher in Yakshagana.

He died on 27 August 2003. in Uppinakudru, an island village located in Kundapura taluk, Udupi District, Karnataka, India.

== Contributions ==
Kamath contributed to development and performance of puppetry art which is based on Yakshagana songs, dance and style and has given hundreds of performances in India and abroad, including in France, Belgium, Holland, Australia, Greece, and Pakistan.

== Puppetry performance ==
The puppets are made of light wood and of 18 inches height and dressed similar to Yakshagana artists and made to move and dance like Yakshagana artists, with song and background music. The performance by Kamath is colourful and very similar to badaguthittu Yakshagana bayalata, the popular whole night performance art prevailing in Coastal areas of Karnataka. These puppet shows are based on mythical stories and on stories from Ramayana and Mahabharatha. There is also another puppetry troupe in Kasargod giving Yakshagana shows in thenkuthittu style.

== Awards ==
Award	Institution/place	Date/Year
Sangeet Natak Akademi Award	National Academi of Music, Dance and Drama, New Delhi, India	1979
Tulsi Samman	Govt. of Madhya Pradesh, India	1993-94
Rajyotsava Award	Government of Karnataka	1986
Konkani Academi Award	Konkani Academi	1995
Dehali Karnataka Sangha Award	Karnataka Sangha, New Delhi	1998

=== Other recognitions ===
- Madras Dooradarshan (Govt. Owned TV) has made a documentary on Kogga Devanna Kamath and his puppetry show.
- Delhi Dooradarshan (Govt. Owned TV) has also made a documentary on Kogga Devanna Kamath.(1984) Several other institutions have honoured him and supported Yakshagana puppetry.

These are magnificent puppets - beautifully designed, made with activity of great craftsman, the designs, constructions and painting - all shows the love and awareness of the true artist. I am very impressed. I hope to learn from such a great Artist and Guru as Sri Kogga Kamath.-Prof. Melvin Helstien, Department of Theatre Arts, University of California

== Continuation of art ==
Bhaskara Devanna Kamath, son of Kogga Devanna Kamath, learned the art from his father and regularly gives performances. He is the convener of Sri Ganesha Yakshagana Gombeyata Mandali, a troupe which is dedicated to giving performances of Yakshagana puppetry. This troupe continues to give performances in India and in several countries like UK etc. He has also developed, as an innovation: puppets to perform trail yoga and called it "Yoga in Puppets". He has also given shows with Konkani and Hindi interpretations for the benefit of different audiences. Bhaskar Kogga Kamath conducts puppetry classes also for Indian and foreign students.

== See also ==
- Yakshagana
- K.V.Ramesh, Puppeteer
