= K. V. Ramesh =

Indian puppeteer

- Education: University of Calicut
- Occupation: Puppeteer
- Years active: 1981–present
- Style: Yakshagana

K. V. Ramesh is an Indian puppeteer, specialising in performances based on Yakshagana art. He most often performs in the Tulu Nadu region of Karnataka and Kerala. He leads the Yakshagana puppet troupe Shri Gopalakrishna Yakshagana Gombeyata Sangha, based out of Kasaragod.

== Career ==
K. V. Ramesh learned Yakshagana puppetry from his father, K. Venkatakrishnaiah. His family has performed Yakshagana puppetry for generations. He is a graduate of Calicut University, and gives performances in the Kannada, Tulu, and Malayalam languages.

Besides performing, Ramesh also creates puppets. His performance are based on thenkuthittu style Yakshagana . His Shri Gopalakrishna Yakshagana Gombeyata troupe, has given such performances since 1981. It is the only troupe that performs Yakshagana puppetry in the thenkuthittu style; the only other troupe, based in Uppinakudru, performs in the badaguthittu style. It is said that there were 20 or 30 such puppetry troupes in the first half of 20th century.

Ramesh and his troupe has given performances in places as varied as Guwahati, Lahore, and Prague.

== Awards ==
- Best Traditional Puppet Performance Award (2010) by the World Association of Puppeteers (Prague)
- Rajyotsava Award

== See also ==
- Kogga Devanna Kamath
