= Yakshagana raga =

Yakshagana rāga (Kannada:ಯಕ್ಷಗಾನ ರಾಗ, pronounced as yaksha-gaana raaga) refers to melodic modes used in Yakshagana. It is based on pre-classical melodic forms that consist of a series of five or more musical notes upon which a melody is founded. Yakshagana rāgas have indigenous rāgas and others derived from other forms of music. Rāgas in yakshagana are closely associated with a set of melodic forms called mattu. Yakshagana rāgas have their own gamaka. Although yakshagana rāgas share names with rāgas in other Indian music systems, they are compositionally different, with a few exceptions. More than 80 rāgas have been identified to have survived the onslaught of popular and elite musical systems. In Yakshagana tradition, rāgas are associated with different times of the night throughout which Yakshagana is performed.

== Nature of yakshagana rāga ==
Rāga describes a generalised form of melodic practice. It also records a set of rules for building the melody. Yakshagana rāga follows not only these rules but also certain rhythmic and melodic structures called mattu. Rāga specifies the rules for movements up (aaroha [आरोह]) and down (avroha [अवरोह]) the musical scale; which swara (notes) should figure more and which should be used more sparingly; which notes to stress more; which notes may be sung with gamaka; phrases to be used; phrases to be avoided; and so on. The result is a framework that can be used to compose or improvise melodies, allowing for endless variation within the set of notes. What makes yakshagana singing different are, among other things, yaksha gamaka, which are distinct sets of notes and also way of approaching a note or rendering a note to form a particular mattu.

More than adhering to stricter scale, yakshagana rāga follows the metre of yakshagana poetry called the Yakshagana Chandhas. The melody is formed from a deep voice formed by controlling muscles as low as pelvic and abdominal muscles. This high pitched singing might have come out of need to reach all audience in a yakshagana bayalata, which is an outdoor activity. Recently singers have adopted softer singing because of the microphone. Some Hindustani rāgas modified to suit yakshagana performance can also be seen (e.g. bhimpalas).

Yakshagana rāgas are rendered but are not elaborated, sung swiftly to suit theatrical performance. Each song may complete within less than a minute, or a few minutes. Therefore, several songs of same rāga used for various plots must be heard to experience the full features of yakshagana rāga.

== Yakshagana rāga and time ==
Unlike in other classical forms yakshagana performance starts with Rāga Naati or Chala Naati in late evening (though the actual story or prasanga starts with Rāga Bhiravi), and ends with Mohana Rāga in early morning.

== Yakshagana gamaka ==
Yakshagana music has its own gamakas. Yakshagana gamakas are name given to the set of sequence of notes often used in only in yakshagana rāgas. It can also refer to, in popular parlance, inflections applied on notes. These gamakas give a distinct flavor to yakshagana rāgas. These gamakas are learned by training and are among features such as mattu which make yakshagana sound different from other forms of music.

== Indigenous yakshagana ragas ==
- Shatpadi (Note that this is different from Kannada prosody by the same name)
- Sangatya
- Kannada (This is different from Kaanada of Hindusthani)
- Hoovu
- Koore (This is different from Kore Tala)
- Nepali
- Gopanithe
- Navarasa
- Vrundhavana
- Mechaali
- Koravi
- Divaali
- Mechchu
- Ghantaarava
- Madhumaadhavi
- Mechaali

== Some well-known ragas ==
These ragas share names of the ragas of Karnataka Sangeetha but structurally different from them with very few exceptions.

- Naati ---- Vaaranaa vadana/Mudadinda Ninnaaa
- Sangatya ---- Kururaaaya idanella kandu
- Regupti ---- Kelu
- Kambhodhi ---- Shatrugna senegala sUtravanu sharisutta (Cognate of Hinsuthani raga)
- Bhairavi ---- Elavo sanjayane kelu, any starting song of a prasanga
- Madhyamavathi ----Sharanu Tiruvagra
- Kalyani
- Kaaphi
- Nilaambari
- Paraju
- Desi (Desh)
- Bilahari
- Yerakala Kambodhi
- Hindola (Almost same as Todi, according to Balipa Shaili)
- Navaroju
- Behaag
- Maaravi
- Savaay
- Saurashtra
- Saranga
- Saveri
- Suruti
- Todi
- Begadi
- Mukhari
- Panturavali
- Kedaragaula ---- Taye kel sri krishna rayana bari salu
- Madhumadhavi
- Mohana ---- Maranayyana Maata, ranganayaka rageeva lochana
- Janjooti

== See also ==
- Melody type
- makam
- echos
- muqam
- Nava rasas
- Rāga, a documentary about the life and music of Ravi Shankar
