= Yakshagana poetry =

Karnatic art content

Yakshagana poetry (Kannada: ಯಕ್ಷಗಾನ ಪ್ರಸ೦ಗ, pronounced as yaksha-gaana prasanga)(Yakshagana Padya or Yakshagana Prasanga) is a collection of Kannada poems used to enact a music dance drama called Yakshagana. The poems are composed in well known Kannada metres using the frame work of Yakshagana Raga and Yakshagana Tala. Yakshagana also has what is called a Yakshagana metre. The collection of Yakshagana poems forming a musical drama is called a Prasanga. Oldest surviving parasanga books are believed to have been composed in the 15th century. Many compositions have been lost. There are evidences to show that oral compositions were in use before the 15th century.

There are more than 300 Yakshagana Prasanga books available today. Attempts are being made to preserve the texts by digitising them.

== Some famous Prasangas ==
Gadhayuddha

- Krishna sandhana
- Basmasura Mohini
- Ratnavati Kalyana
- Bhishma Vijaya
- Chandrahasa Charitre
- Abhimanyu Kalaya
- Sudhanva Kalaga
- Sugreeva Vijayam ((Andhra Yakshaganamu) Telugu - 1570) Kandukuru Rudra Kavi

== See also ==
- Kannada literature
- Yaksha Prasanga Kosha
- Prasanga Prathi Sangraha
- Android app to view/download Yakshagana Prasanga Books
