= Chande =

Unpitched percussion instrument

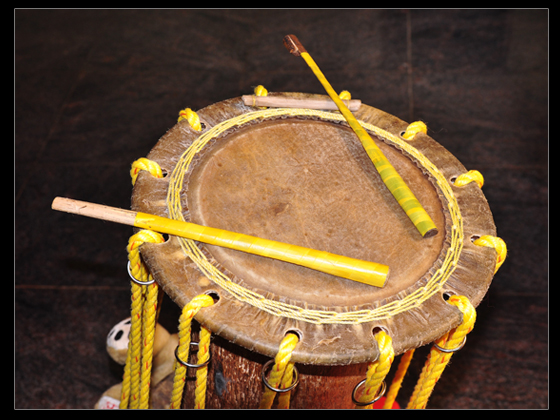
D - E shruti Chande top (placed for left hand play).

The chande is a drum used in the traditional and classical music of South India and particularly in Yakshagana theatre art of Karnataka. It follows the Yakshagana Tala system. The rhythms are based on pre-classical music forms that Karnataka Sangeta and Hindustani Sangeetha are based on. There are different varieties of this instrument; two major varieties being the Badagu Thittu Chande (Northern School) and the Thenku Thittu Chande (Southern School). The latter can also be spelled chenda and is used exclusively in the art forms of southern coastal Karnataka and Kerala. This article deals with Badagu Thittu Chande, used exclusively in Yakshagana of Karnataka. The chande used in Badagu Thittu is structurally and acoustically different from the chenda used in Kerala.

== History ==
In ancient Hindu sculpture, painting, and mythology, the chande is often depicted as the instrument used to declare war (rana chande - war drum). This instrument can produce complicated rhythms that can be heard from more than 3 km. However Chande is the relatively recent addition to Yakshagana orchestra. It is believed it came to be used since 150 or so years ago.

Its body is constructed from wood of the jackfruit (or Kakke/Baine/Jambe) tree. The body is called 'goodu' in Kannada. Chande players follow the Yakshagana system of talas (or taalams). There are similarities to the Karnataka Sangeetha talas. The rhythm system itself has pre-classical origins.

== Physical components ==
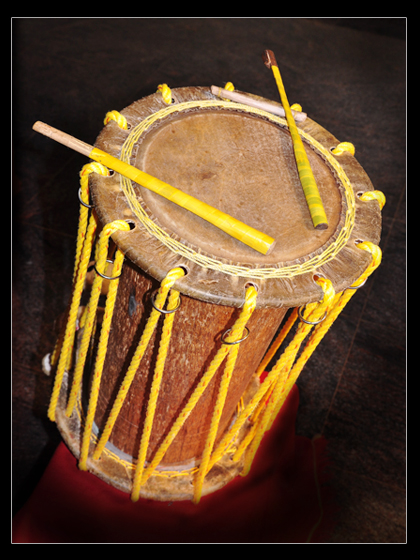
D - E shruti Chande top.

The circular drum head is made of processed cow skin. Usually there are 12 hinges that hold the drum head to the wooden trunk using thick ropes. Typical drum head size is about 32 cm and about 23 cm inner diameter. Playing area of drum head is about 20 cm in diameter. Wedges inserted inside the ropes are twisted to tighten or loosen the drum head while tuning. A tubular wooden wedge is tied to edge of the drum head to roll using dominant hand. Traditionally the chande must be tuned to an octave above singers tonic (Higher Shadja).

== Posture ==
The chande is played using two sticks. It is held vertical, but slightly slanted as to ensure the leather at the base does not touch the floor.

== Chande sticks ==
Chande sticks are drum sticks called chande kolu in Kannada and are specially made for the chande. The shape and thickness of the stick varies along its length. The left hand and right hand sticks are shaped differently as well. Typically, the length is around 28 centimeters; however it can vary with the diameter of the drum head.

== Methods of use ==
The sticks are flexible and are usually made from a type of bamboo. The head of the stick used for the dominant hand is thicker and the body tapers and the end where the hand grips the stick is of normal size. The other stick is slightly thicker and less tapered. The dominant stick usually rests on the wedge of the drum head and the stick is rolled to produce the fluttering sound. It is this feature that gives chande an advantage of producing multiple fillers in between the beats that hands or fingers usually will not be able to produce on drums. It is played in a forceful manner. The chande groves form what is called the Yakshagana Tala.

== Audio Sample ==
Yakshagana Chande Badagu sample
Abbara

== Yakshaganic drum rudiments ==
The students of Chande have to learn some rudiments to be able to master playing chande. These include the following.

=== Stick Combination ===
Various (left)L (right)R combination.

=== Rolling ===
Learning horalike ("rolling") involves learning:

1. Ka da thka
2. Ta ka da

and their combination. For advanced performances players learn double (Eradhoralke) and triple rolling (Moorhorlke).

== See also ==
- Karatalas
- Maddale
- Tabla
- Tala-Maddale
- Thavil
