= Uppinakudru =

Coordinates: 13°39′32″N 74°41′22″E

Uppinakudru Lavanapura
- village
- Interactive map of Uppinakudru
- Country: India
- State: Karnataka
- District: Udupi

Area
  - Total: 2.53 km^{2} (0.98 sq mi)
- Elevation: 20 m (66 ft)

Population
  - Total: 2,000
  - Density: 790/km^{2} (2,000/sq mi)

Languages
  - Official: Kannada
- Time zone: UTC+5:30 (IST)
- PIN: 576230
- Telephone code: 08254

Uppinakudru, is a small island located six kilometres north of Kundapura town in Udupi District of Karnataka.

== Etymology ==
The island's name Uppinakudru comes from the two words in Kannada 'uppu' (salt) and 'kudru' (island). It means an island of salt or salty island.

== History ==
The island, isolated from the mainland of Kundapura, was accessible only by boats. During the reign of Tippu Sultan, Uppinakudru was a major arsenal. It was also through here that boats entered from the Arabian Sea and moved towards Basrur, which was a major trade centre up to the nineteenth century. A thick presence of coconut trees was to be found around the island, which effectively hid the island.

== Learning centres ==
The village has three Anganwadis and a government higher primary school which was built in 1917. In 1992 a new school building was constructed.

A government high school was established in 1993.

== Economy ==
Residents of the island largely depend on agriculture mostly growing paddy, peanuts and various types of dal (pulses/lentils). There is a milk collecting centre which also provides government-subsidised cattle feeds. Formerly, sugarcane was largely grown on the island but not anymore due to unreliable markets.

== Local government ==
The island is administered as part of the Tallur Gram Panchayat.

== See also ==
- Yakshagana
- Kundapura Taluk
