= Tala-Maddale =

Tala-Maddale is an ancient form of performance dialogue or debate performance in Southern India in the Karavali and Malnad regions of Karnataka and Kerala. The plot and content of the conversation is drawn from popular mythology but the performance mainly consists of an impromptu debate between characters involving sarcasm, puns, philosophy positions and humour. The main plot is sung from the same oral texts used for the Yakshgana form of dance- drama. Performers claim that this was a more intellectual rendition of the dance during the monsoon season.

The art form is popular in Uttara Kannada, Dakshina Kannada, Udupi and Shimoga districts of Karnataka and Kasaragod district of Kerala. It is a derived form of Yakshagana—a classical dance or musical form of art from the same region.

== Performances ==
A typical Tala-Maddale show consists of veteran artists sitting in a circular fashion along with a Bhagavata (the singer, with "Tala" or pair of small hand cymbals) and a "Maddale" (a type of drum) player. Artists play the roles of characters in stories, typically, from Ramayana, Mahabharata, and other puranas. Some consider them as a good presentation of oratorial skills.

Artists are normally well versed with the Hindu epics and puranas. Kannada language is the normal medium of communication. Tala-Maddale performances are mostly held during the night, the traditional reason being that in ancient times, people finished their work by this time and assembled in temples to watch Tala Maddale. It is organized by either hobbyists who are interested in the art at their houses or as a public event in villages and towns.

As is common in many Indian art forms, A Tala Maddale performance is commenced with a puja to Lord Ganesh (the Hindu God of knowledge, learning and art) with a prayer song by Bhagavatha. Usually this song is "Gajamukhadavage ganapage". This tends to be followed by a combination of pre scripted and ex tempore debates between the artists. Hence, while the average length of a performance is about three hours, it can extend depending upon the debate. Due to the latter, artists are expected to be well versed with the subject matter too. In ancient times, Tala-Maddale performances often took the form of all-night performances, from 7 pm right up to 6 am.

Subjects of Tala Maddale performances normally focus on episodes from the Hindu epics of Bhagavata and Puranas. However, episodes have also been created on other more current issues, some of which include the Second World War, the Tashkent Agreement, the Indian freedom struggle (Swarajya Vijaya) and computerisation (Ganakasura Kalaga).

Some of the popular Tala maddale artists are Sheni Gopala Krishna Bhat, Kerekai Krishna Bhat, Kerekai Umakant Bhat, Polali Shankaranarayana Shastri, Shankaranarayana Samaga, Matti Subba Rao, Vasudeva Samaga, Prabhakara Joshi, M.V. Hegde, Kumble Sundara Rao, M.L. Samaga, Padekallu Vishnu Bhat, Sadashiva Alva Talapady, Appu Nayak Athrady, Ramana Acharya, Krishnapura Hari Bhat and Prashanth Belur. Artha vaibhava or the grandeur of dialogues tends to be a highlight of these performances relished by the rasikas (audience).

In August 2016, the story of the Indian Freedom Struggle, Swarajya Vijaya, was enacted in Tala Maddale in the outer yard of the Sri Ananteshwara Temple at Rajangana, Karnataka. The episode (prasanga) had been written by M.V. Hegde. A similar Tala Maddale performance related to the Indian freedom struggle had been held at this very place on 14 August 1947 when India achieved freedom from British Colonial powers.

You may watch a video clip of Taala Maddale ತಾಳ ಮದ್ದಲೆ session here.

== Other information ==
- Tala Maddale
- "Yakshagana. A South Indian Folk Theatre"
- http://kasargod.nic.in/profile/yakshagana.htm
- http://www.ourkarnataka.com/shenigopalakrishnabhat/sheni_main.htm

Introduction to Maddale https://www.youtube.com/watch?v=RbPtmXeIowQ
