= Mysore painting =

Classical South Indian painting style

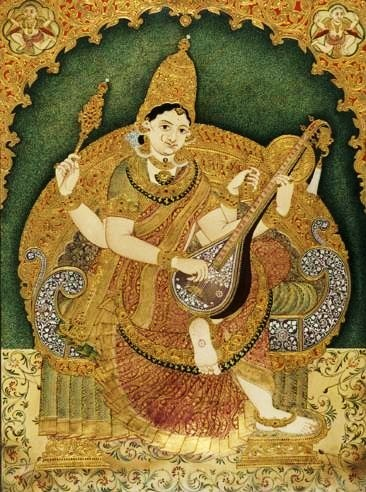
Mysore Painting depicting Goddess Saraswati

Mysore painting (Kannada: ಮೈಸೂರು ಚಿತ್ರಕಲೆ) is an important form of classical South Indian painting style that originated in and around the town of Mysore in Karnataka. The painting style was encouraged and nurtured by the Mysore rulers. Painting in Karnataka has a long and illustrious history, tracing its origins back to the Ajanta Caves period (2nd century BC to 6th century AD). The distinct school of Mysore painting evolved from the paintings during the Vijayanagara Empire period, the rulers of Vijayanagara and their feudatories encouraged literature, art and architecture as well as religious and philosophical discussions. With the fall of the Vijayanagara Empire after the 1565 Battle of Talikota, the artists who were until then under royal patronage migrated to various places such as Mysore, Tanjore, and Surpur among others. Absorbing the local artistic traditions and customs, the erstwhile Vijayanagara school of painting gradually evolved into the many styles of painting in South India, including the Mysore and Tanjore schools of painting.

Mysore paintings are known for their elegance, muted colours, and attention to detail. The themes for most of these paintings are Hindu gods and goddesses and scenes from Hindu mythology.

== History ==
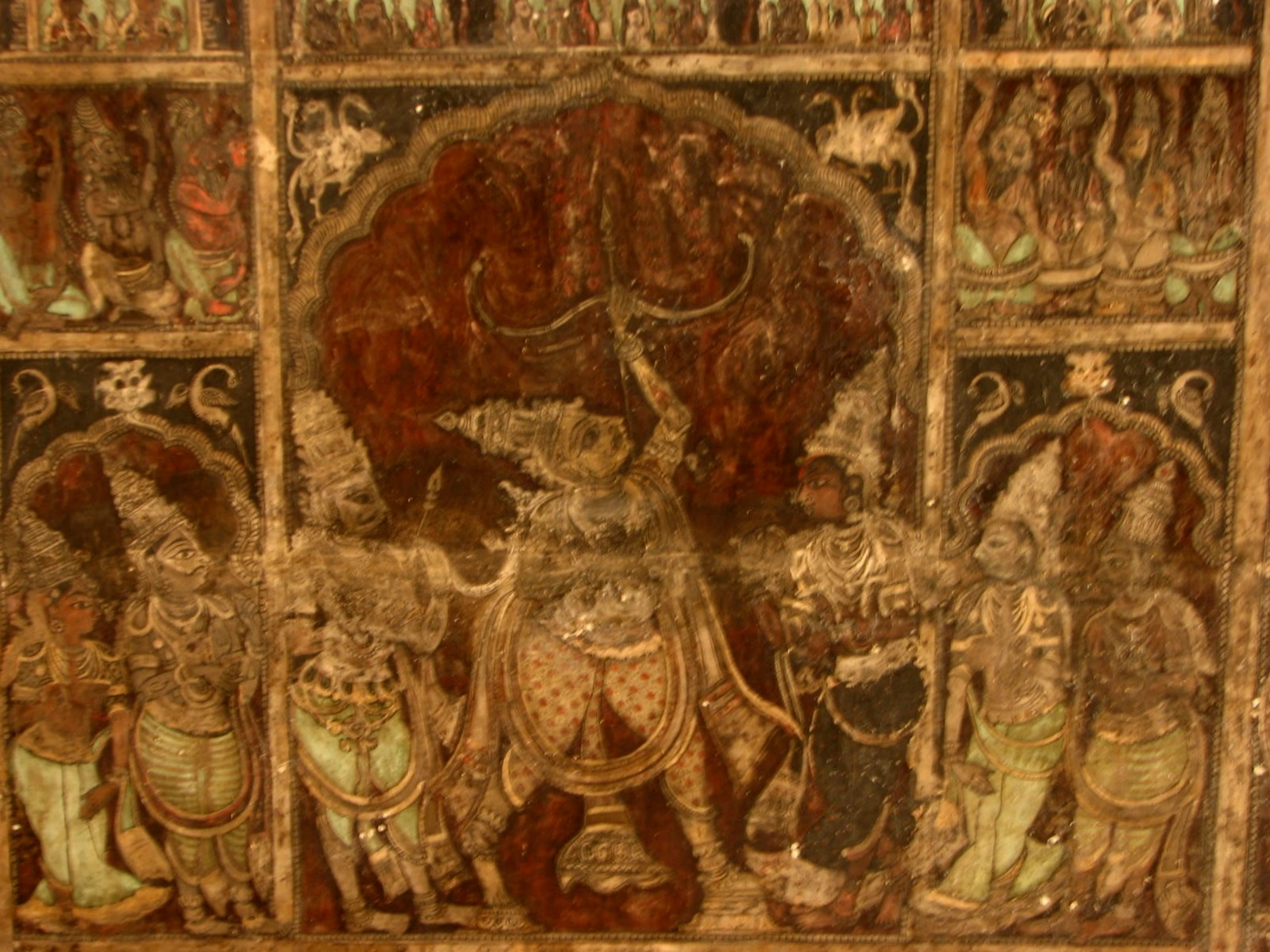
Painted ceiling, Virupaksha temple, Hampi, 15th century

The fall of the Vijayanagar Empire in 1565 AD and the sack of Hampi in the Battle of Talikota resulted initially in distress for scores of families of painters who had been dependent on the patronage of the empire. As Dr. Charita points out, these families of artists, called Chitrakaras, migrated to various pockets (feudatories) of the Vijayanagara Empire. As scholar A.L. Narasimhan traces, some of these surviving paintings are witnessed at Shravanabelagola, Sira, Keregoodirangapura, Srirangapattana, Nippani, Sibi, Naragunda, Bettadapura, Hardanahalli, Mudukutore, Mysore, Chitradurga, Kollegala, Raichur, Hiriyur, Benakanakere, Anegundi, Yalladahalli, Lepakshi and many other places located in Karnataka. Raja Wodeyar I (1578–1617 A.D) provided a vital service to the cause of painting by rehabilitating several families of painters of the Vijayanagara School at Srirangapatna.

The successors of Raja Wodeyar continued to patronize the art of painting by commissioning temples and palaces to be painted with mythological scenes. However, none of these paintings have survived due to the ravages of war between the British on the one side and Hyder Ali and Tippu Sultan on the other. Hyder and Tippu who bested the Wodeyars took over the reins of Mysore for a brief period. However, the artists (Chitragars) continued to be patronised and flourished under the reign of Tipu and Hyder too. The Narasimha swamy temple in Seebi on the highway between Tumkur and Sira was built by Nallappa who was in the service of both Haidar Ali and Tipu Sultan, during Tipu's reign and has several wonderful wall frescoes in the Vijayanagar style which gradually evolved into the Mysore and Tanjore schools of painting. The murals detailing the Battle of Polilur and other painted work at the Daria Daulat Bagh palace of Tipu Sultan in Ganjam, Srirangapatna are also prime examples of the Mysore school of painting.

After the death of Tipu Sultan in 1799 AD, the state was restored back to the Wodeyars of Mysore and its ruler Mummadi Krishnaraja Wodeyar III (1799-1868 AD) who was contemporaneous with Serfoji II of Thanjavur. This ushered in a new era by reviving the ancient traditions of Mysore and extending patronage to music, sculpture, painting, dancing and literature. Most of the traditional paintings of the Mysore School, which have survived until today, belong to this reign. Furthermore, Krishnaraja Wodeyar provided new fillip to the artists of the Mysore school through his Magnum Opus Sritattvanidhi, which would remain the ready reckoner on Mysore style for many years to come. On the walls of Jagan Mohan Palace, Mysore (Karnataka), the fascinating range of paintings which flourished under Krishnaraja Wodeyar can be seen: from portraits of the Mysore rulers, their family members and important personages in Indian history, through self-portraits of the artists themselves which Krishnaraja Wodeyar coaxed them to paint, to murals depicting the Hindu pantheon and Puranic and mythological scenes.

== Literary and inscriptional ==
The most famous of the manuscripts detailing the various nuances of the Mysore school and listing out the various Gods and Goddesses, is the Sritattvanidhi, a voluminous work of 1500 pages prepared under the patronage of Mummadi Krishnaraja Wodeyar. This pictorial digest is a compendium of illustrations of gods, goddesses and mythological figures with instructions to painters on an incredible range of topics concerning composition placement, colour choice, individual attributes and mood. The ragas, seasons, eco-happenings, animals, and plant world are also effectively depicted in these paintings as co-themes or contexts.

Other Sanskrit literary sources such as the Visnudharmottara Purana, Abhilasitarthacintamani and Sivatatvaratnakara also throw light on the objectives and principles of painting, methods of preparing pigments, brushes and the carrier, qualifications of the chitrakar (traditional community of painters) the principles of painting and the technique to be followed.

== Materials ==
The ancient painters in Mysore prepared their own materials. The colours were from natural sources and were of vegetable or mineral substances such as leaves, stones and flowers. Brushes were made with squirrel hairs for delicate work, but for drawing superfine lines, a brush made of pointed blades of a special variety of grass had to be used. Due to the long-lasting quality of the stone- and plant-based colours used, the original Mysore paintings retain their freshness and lustre even today.

== Technique and characteristic ==
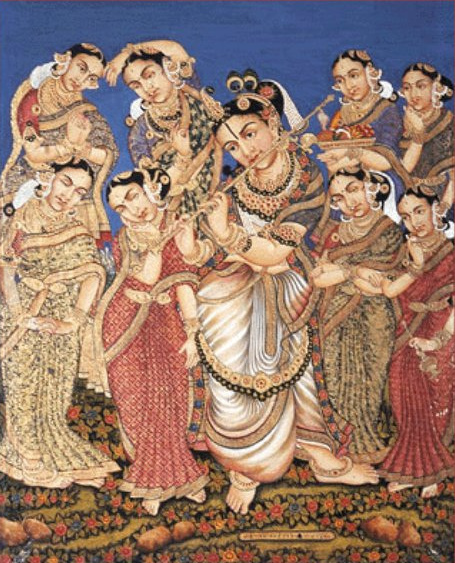
Mysore Painting depicting Krishna with his eight principal wives.

Mysore Paintings are characterized by delicate lines, intricate brush strokes, graceful delineation of figures and the discreet use of bright vegetable colours and lustrous gold leaf. More than mere decorative pieces, the paintings are designed to inspire feelings of devotion and humility in the viewer. The painter’s individual skill in giving expression to various emotions is therefore of paramount importance to this style of painting.

The first stage of Mysore Painting was to prepare the ground; paper, wood, cloth or wall grounds were variously used. The paper board was made of paper pulp or waste paper, which was dried in the sun and then rubbed smooth with a polished quartz pebble. If the ground was cloth it was pasted on a wooden board using a paste composed of dry white lead (safeda) mixed with gum and a small quantity of gruel (ganji). The board was then dried and burnished. Wood surfaces were prepared by applying dry white lead, yellow ochre and gum, and walls were treated with yellow ochre, chalk and gum. After preparation of the ground a rough sketch of the picture was drawn with crayon prepared from the straight twigs of the tamarind tree. The next step was to paint the furthest objects such as sky, hill and river and then gradually animal and human figures were approached in greater detail. After colouring the figures, the artists would turn to elaboration of the faces, dress and ornaments including the gesso work (gold covering), which is an important feature of Mysore painting.

== Gesso work ==
Gesso work was the hallmark of all traditional paintings of Karnataka. Gesso refers to the paste mixture of white lead powder, gambose and glue which is used as an embossing material and covered with gold foil. The gesso work in Mysore paintings is low in relief and intricate as compared to the thick gold relief work of the Tanjore School. Gesso was used in Mysore painting for depicting intricate designs of clothes, jewellery and architectural details on pillars and arches that usually framed the deities. The work was taken up in the morning when the base of the gold work on the painting was still moist so as to hold the gold foil firmly. After allowing the painting to dry, glazing was carried out by covering the painting with thin paper and rubbing over it with a soft glazing stone known as kaslupada kallu. When the thin paper was removed the painting shone brightly and looked resplendent with the combination of gold and a variety of colours.

== See also ==
- Mysore pak
- Mysore Agarbathi
- Mysore Sandal Soap
- Mysore Sandalwood Oil
- Channapatna toys
