= Kondapalli toys =

Wooden toys in Andhra Pradesh, India

- Geographical indication
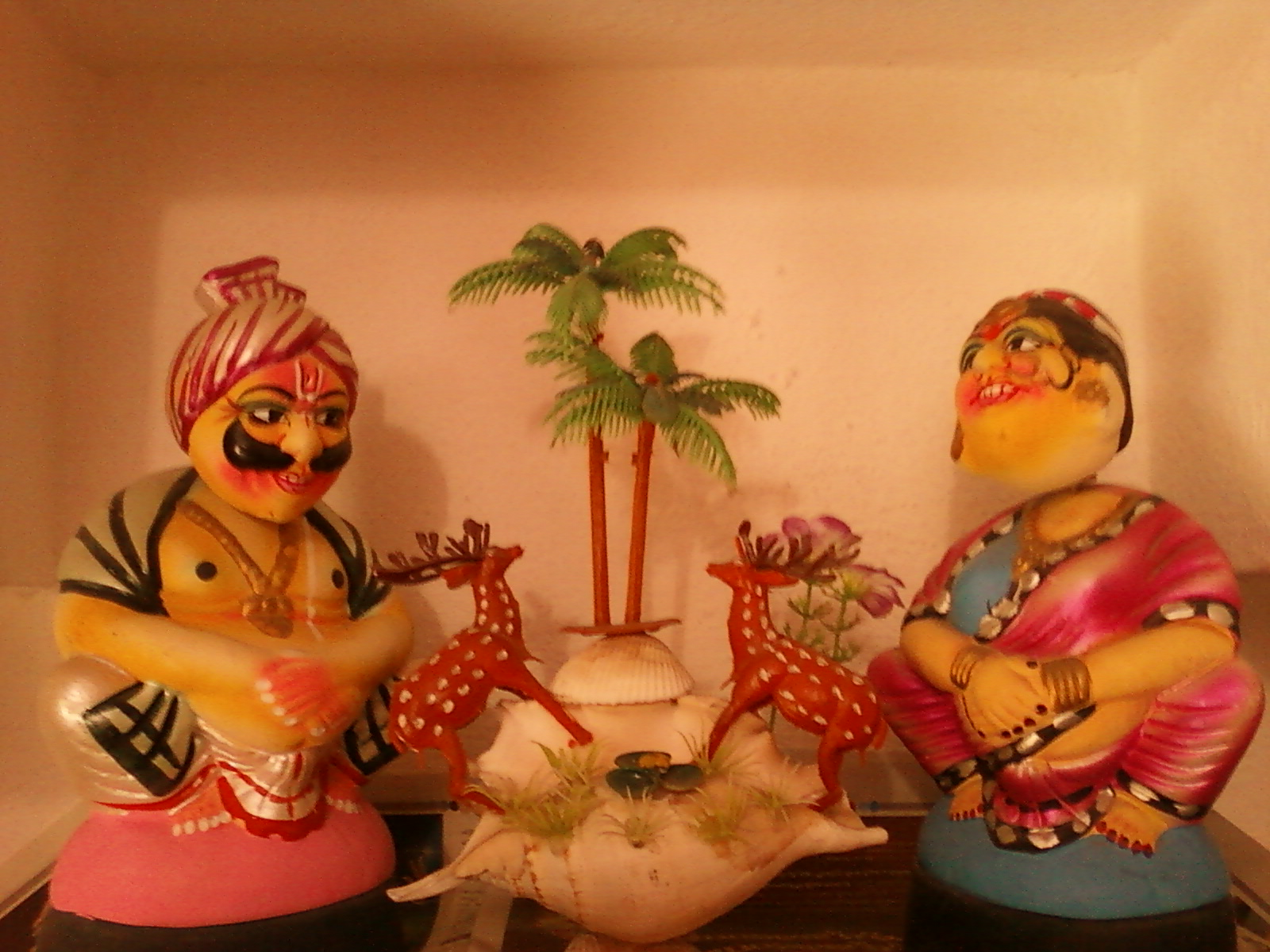
- Kondapalli toys at a house in Vijayawada
- Alternative names: Kondapalli Bommalu
- Description: Toys crafted out of Softwood namely, Tella Poniki
- Type: Handicraft
- Area: Kondapalli, Vijayawada, Andhra Pradesh
- Country: India
- Material: Wood

Kondapalli toys are toys made of wood in Kondapalli of Krishna district, Vijayawada in the Indian state of Andhra Pradesh. Bommala Colony translates to Toys Colony in Kondapalli is the place where the art of crafting takes place. It was registered as one of the geographical indication handicraft from Andhra Pradesh as per Geographical Indications of Goods (Registration and Protection) Act, 1999. This GI application was filed by LIGHT (LANCO Institute of General Humanitarian Trust) and Kondapalli Wooden Toys Manufacturers.These toys were one of the varieties of toys assembled in the houses during the festivals of Sankranti and Navratri and is referred as Bommala Koluvu.

== History ==
The art of crafting is a 400-year-old tradition. The artisans who make the toys are referred as Aryakhastriyas (also known as Nakarshalu), who have their mention in the Brahmanda Purana. They are said to have migrated from Rajasthan in the 16th century to Kondappali and claims their origin to Muktharishi, a sage endowed with skills in arts and crafts by Lord Shiva.

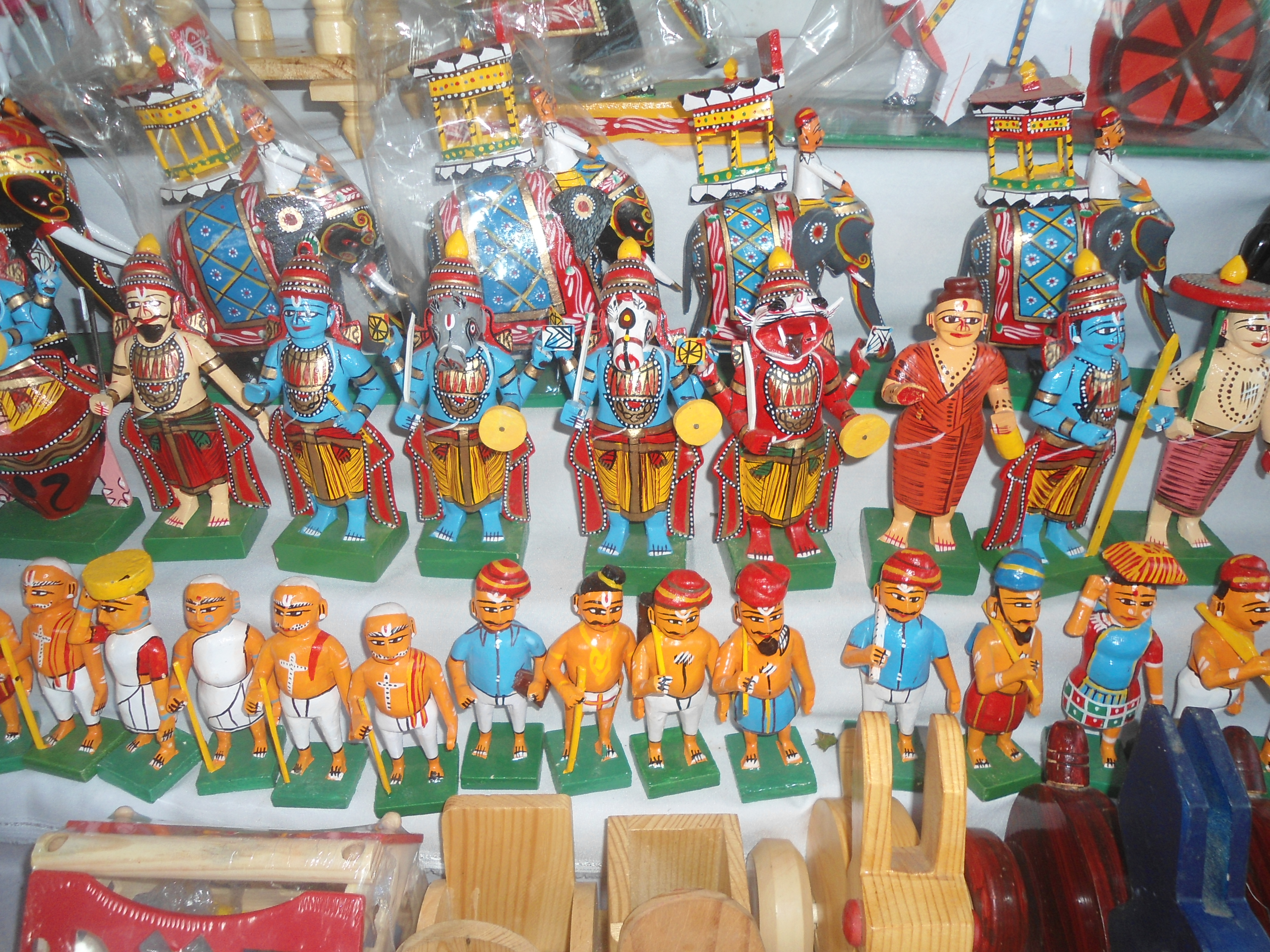
Wood craft models on display at Shilparamam in Hyderabad

== Toy crafting ==
The Kondapalli toys are made from soft wood known as Tella Poniki which are found in nearby Kondapalli Hills. Each part is carved out separately. Then makku- a paste of tamarind seed powder & sawdust is used to join pieces together, add details and finish the toys. The later step involves coloring with either oil and water-colours or vegetable dyes and enamel paints are applied based on the type of the toys. The artisans mainly work on producing figures of mythology, animals, birds, bullock carts, rural life etc., and the most notable one is Dasavataram, etc.

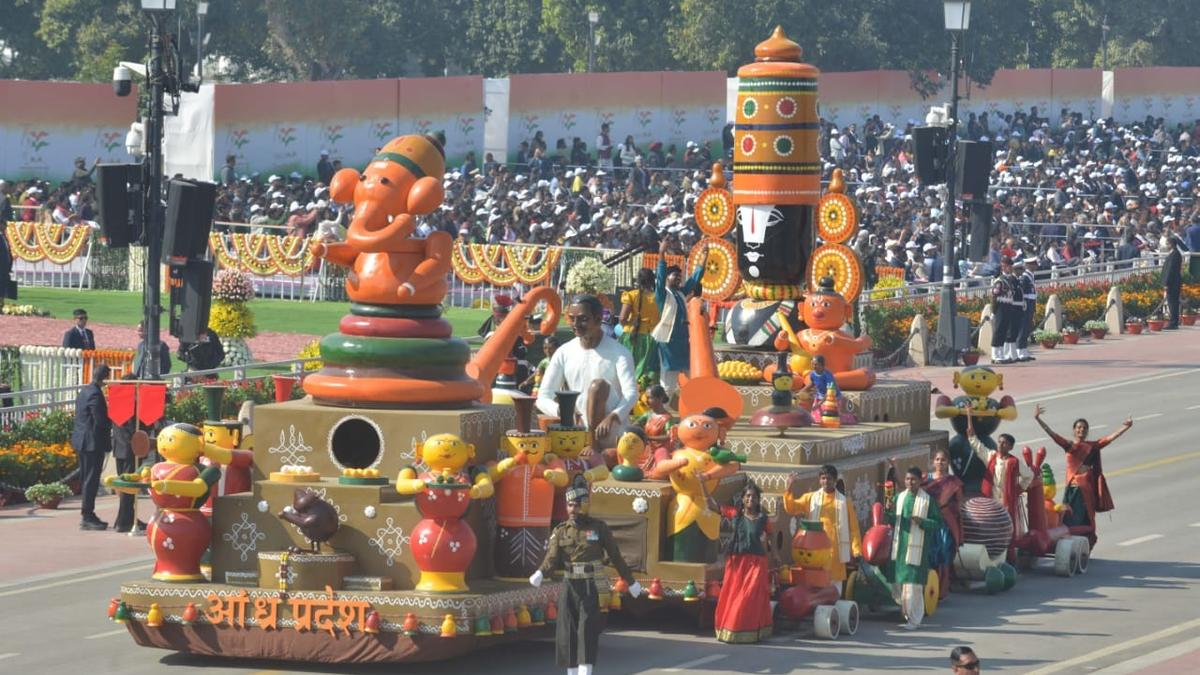
AP's float in 2025 Republic Day designed off of Kondapalli toys.

== Support ==
The art form which has got patronage from the rulers in ancient times is in decline due to lack of profits, time taking to produce toys, influence of western art and younger generations not encouraged towards this art. Lepakshi and Lanco Institute of General Humanitarian Trust took initiative to keep alive the art of crafting toys.

== See also ==
- Kinnal Craft
- Channapatna toys
- Bidriware
- List of Geographical Indications in India
