= Mysore Rosewood Inlay =

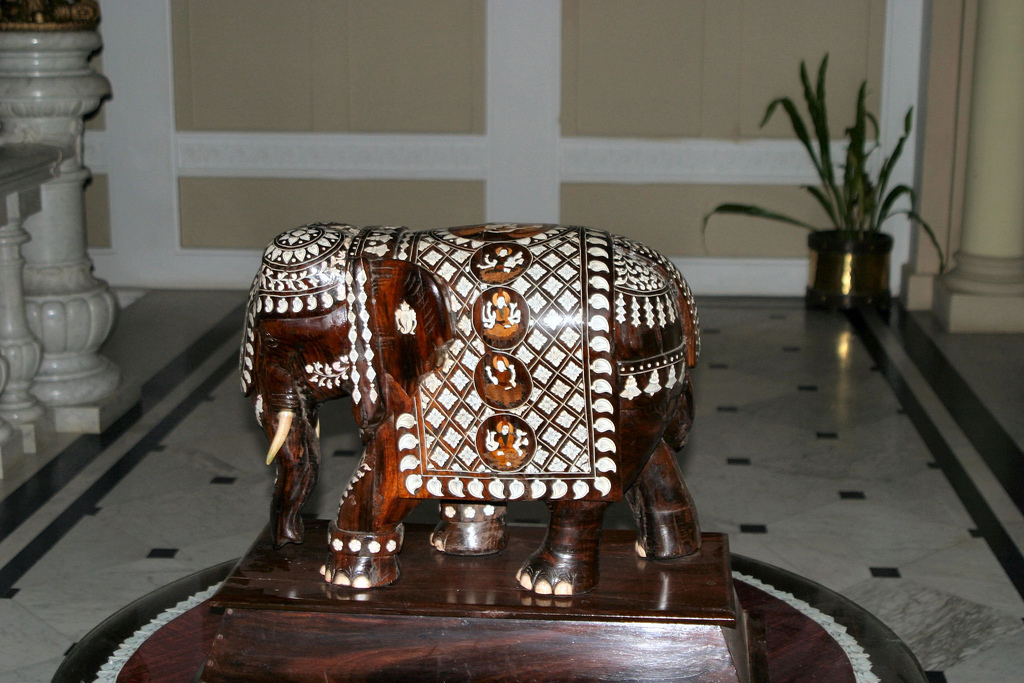
inlaid wood carving, Lalitha Mahal Palace Hotel

Mysore Rosewood Inlay covers a range of techniques used by artisans in around the area of Mysore in sculpture and the decorative for inserting pieces of contrasting, often coloured materials like ivory shells, mother-of-pearl, horn and sandalwood into depressions in a rosewood object to form ornament or pictures that normally are flush with the matrix. These artifacts are manufactured in around the region of Mysore, these artifacts have been awarded Geographical Indication tag from the Government of India in 2005 due to its historic representation as an artifact depicting the region and the design and style used by the local artisans

== History ==
Rosewood mostly got about around from forestry area covering Mysuru regions has been used for furniture and artifacts from the time of Tipu Sultan about 1800s, (Tipu Sultan died on May 4, 1799, please verify) (looks like the art came from the Vijayanagar empire and was nurtured by the Wadiyar kings) was further promoted by local Mysuru maharaja during 1914 sent a casket with a photoframe with ivory inlay for British empire exhibition which won a gold medal, from then on have been a major touristic attraction and supply from the region around Mysuru.

== Method of manufacturing ==
Rosewood, yellow wood and ebony are used as raw materials and designs depicting are carved into them after which various artifacts from paint to gold silver, plastic coated with hydrogen peroxide (instead of ivory), sandalwood are inlaid into the wood after carving depicting nature and Hindu mythological epic stories.

== Geographical indication ==
The Karnataka State Handicraft Development Corporation Ltd proposed the registration of Mysuru Rosewood Inlay under the Geographical Indications of Goods Act, 1999, to the Office of the Controller-General of Patents, Designs and Trademarks, Chennai, in order to make it exclusive to the manufacturers of Mysuru Rosewood Inlays whose design and material represent region to use the name Mysuru. It was granted the Geographical Indication status, three years later, in 2005.

== See also ==
- Kinnal Craft
- Channapatna toys
- Bidriware
- Mysore Sandal Soap
- List of Geographical Indications in India
- Inlay
