= Karnataka Soaps and Detergents Limited =

Indian company, headquarter in Bangalore, Karnataka

- Karnataka Soaps and Detergents Limited logo
- Type: Public Sector Undertaking
- Industry: Personal care
- Founded: 10 May 1916; 110 years ago
- Founders: Maharaja Krishna Raja Wadiyar IV; M. Visvesvaraya
- Headquarters: Bengaluru, Karnataka, India
- Products: Soaps, detergents, sandalwood oil, fragrances, hand washes, face washes, coconut oil, agarbathis, liquid detergents
- Owner: Government of Karnataka

Karnataka Soaps and Detergents Limited (KSDL) is an Indian company, owned by the Government of Karnataka, that manufactures personal care products including Mysore Sandal Soap. It was founded as Government Sandalwood Oil Factory in 1916 by Sosale Garalapuri Shastri and M. Visvesvaraya for extracting and exporting sandalwood oil. It launched Mysore Sandal Soap in 1918, and has since manufactured soaps and cosmetics products. The company became a public sector enterprise in 1980 and was renamed as KSDL.

KSDL obtained the Geographical Indication tag for Mysore Sandal Soap and Mysore Sandalwood Oil in 2006. Apart from soaps and sandalwood oil, KSDL manufactures detergents, fragrances, talcum powder, hand washes, face washes, coconut oil and agarbathis. It has manufacturing facilities in Bengaluru, Mysore and Shimoga, and exports its products to 11 countries as of 2019.

== Brand ambassador ==
In May 2025, the Congress-led Karnataka government has signed a two-year contract with Bollywood actress Tamannaah Bhatia for a reported sum of Rs 6.2 crore.

=== Criticism ===
The move has drawn sharp criticism from pro-Kannada groups, local activists, and opposition leaders that the choice of a non-Kannada-speaking actor to represent one of Karnataka's most treasured heritage brands and that the government should have chosen a Kannada actress to represent a brand that is deeply rooted in Karnataka's cultural legacy. Responding to the criticism, government said that the Mysore Sandal already has strong brand recall within Karnataka. The objective was to expand the reach of Mysore Sandal Soap beyond Karnataka and position it as a national and global brand.

== Media gallery ==
Gallery of products of KSDL
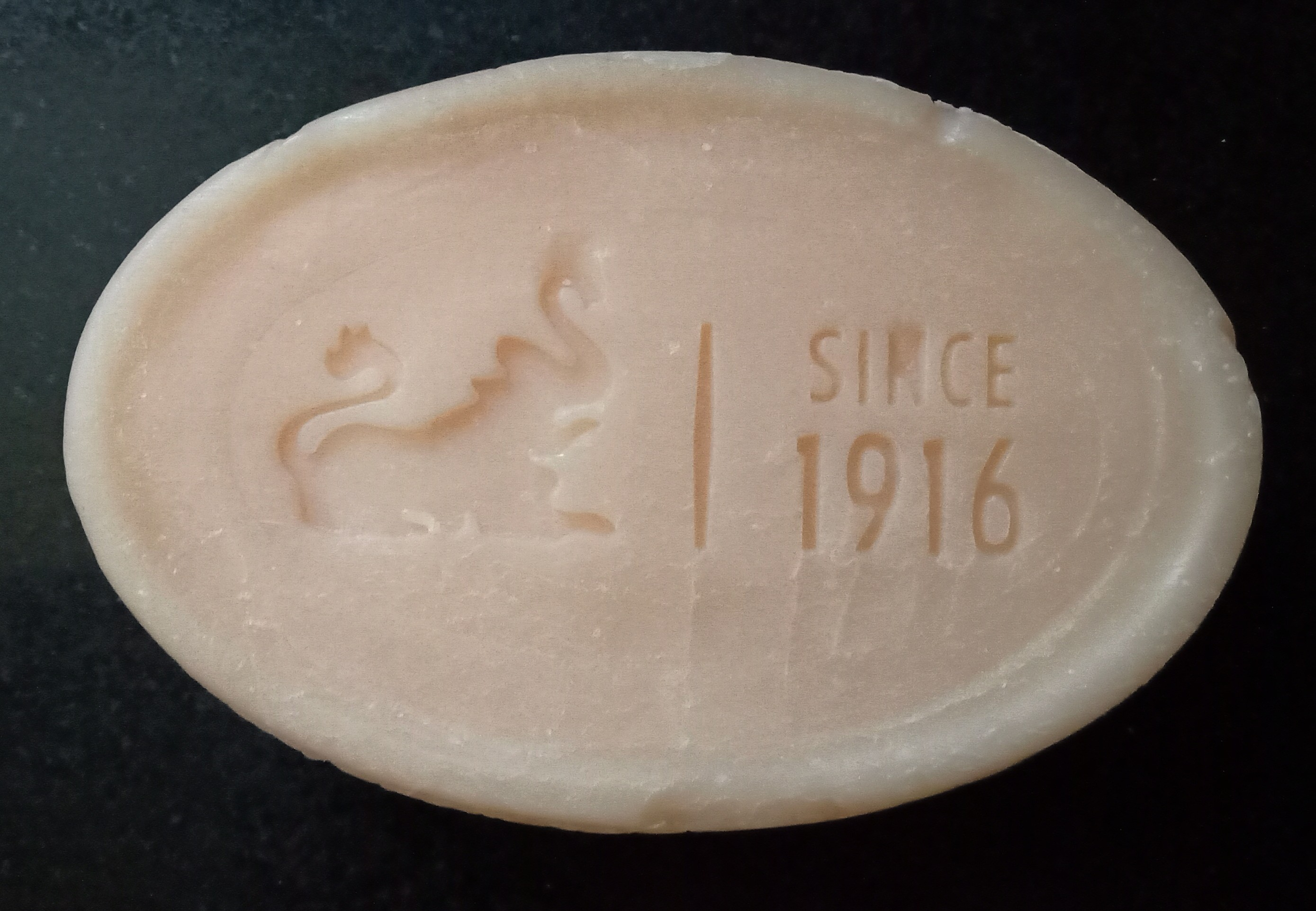
Mysore Sandal Soap (2016)

Mysore Sandal Sambrani (2026)

Mysore Sandal Dhoop (2026)
