= J. J. Sudborough =

British professor of chemistry (1869–1963)

John Joseph Sudborough (1869 – 25 July 1963) was a British professor of chemistry. He specialized in physical organic chemistry with studies on steric hindrance in benzene compounds. He was the founding professor at the department of organic chemistry at the Indian Institute of Science, Bangalore

Sudborough was born in Birmingham and after schooling there he went to Mason College where he studied under W. A. Tilden and Charles Lapworth. He received a BSc from London in 1889 and worked at Mason College under Tilden studying reactions of nitrosyl chloride and terpenes. With a scholarship he went to Germany in 1891 and studied under Victor Meyer in Heidelberg. His doctoral thesis of 1893 was on isomeric change in the Stilbene series. He then worked as an assistant to Meyer studying steric hindrance in benzoic acid derivatives. He also received a DSc from London. In 1895 he became a lecturer at Nottingham University College working with F. S. Kipping. He continued work on steric hindrance in trinitrobenzene. In 1901 he moved to Aberystwyth to succeed Henry Lloyd Snape as professor. He worked on physical organic chemistry examining the kinetics of esterification and hydrolysis of esters. After the death of his wife in 1911, he accepted a position as a founding professor of organic chemistry at the newly created Indian Institute of Science in Bangalore. Here much of his work was for industrial application and along with Indian students, he worked on the chemistry of natural products including sardine oil, mahua oil, sandalwood oil, and tar from coconut shells. He married again in India and retired in 1925 to live in South Devon and later at Torquay.
