= Daria Daulat Bagh =

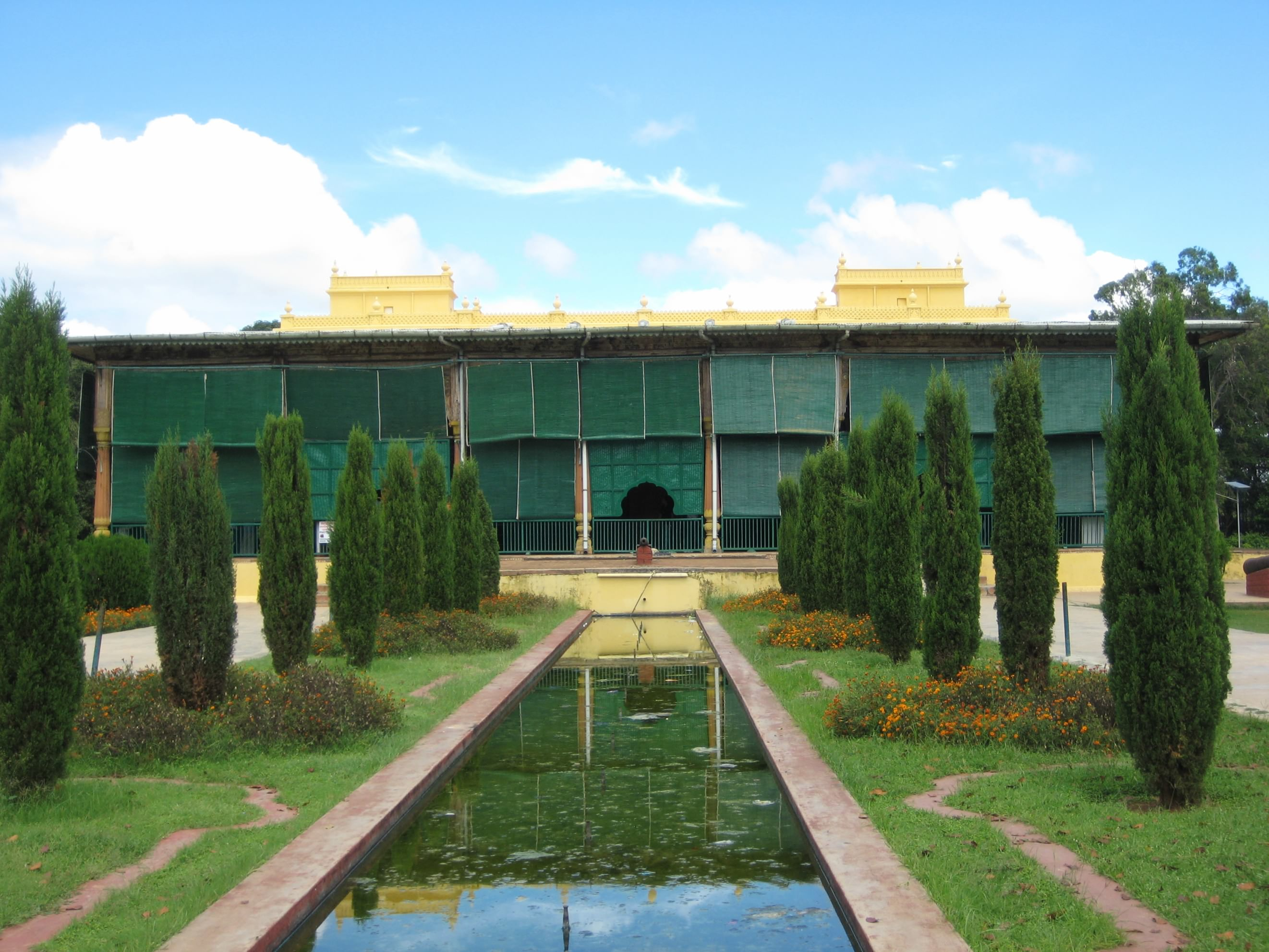
- View from the entrance
- Interactive map of Daria Daulat Bagh
- Location: Srirangapatna, Karnataka, India

History
- Built: 1784
- Built for: Tipu Sultan

Site notes
- Architectural style: Deccani (Indo-Persianate)

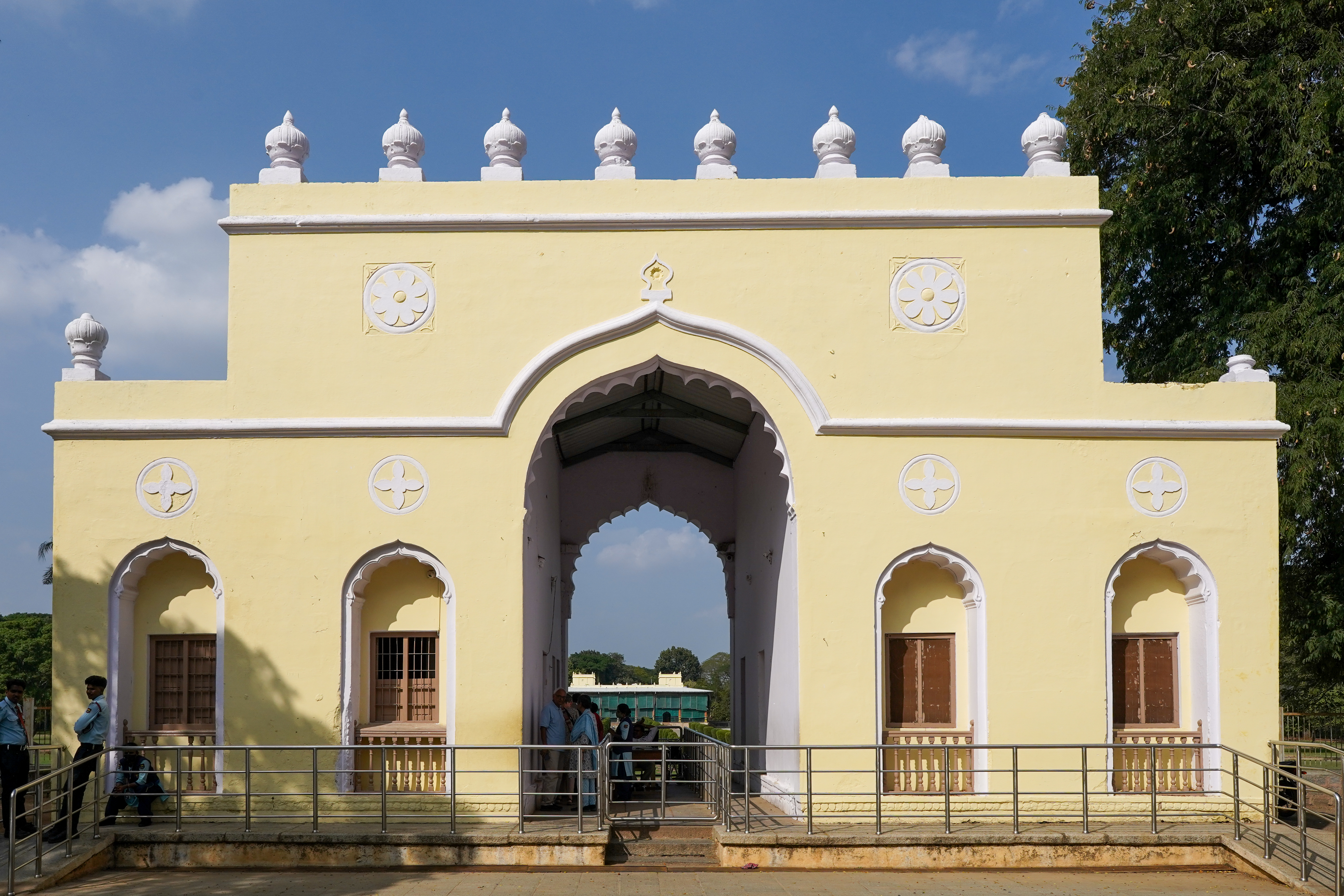
South gate of Daria Daulat Bagh

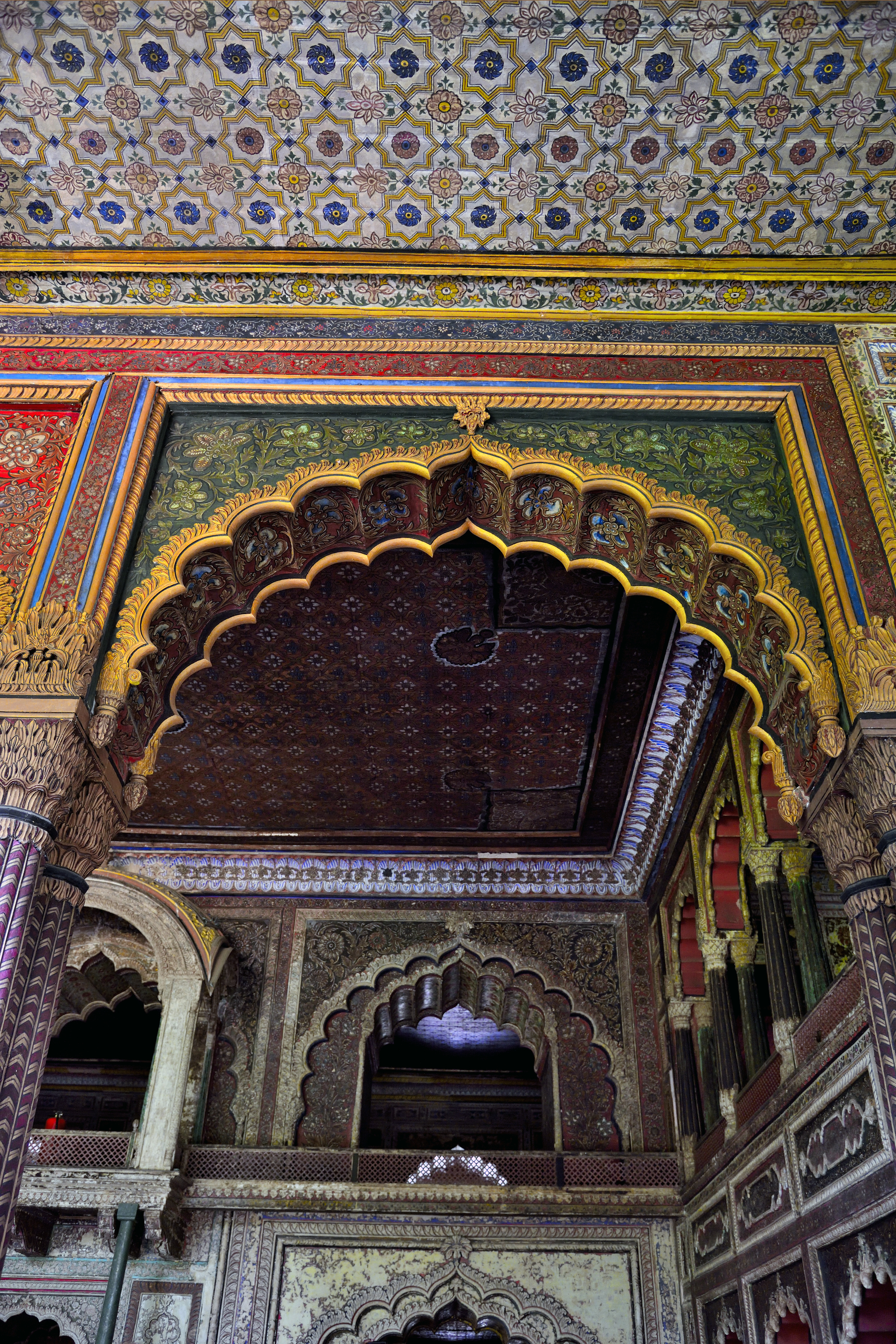
The walls, pillars, canopies and arches at Daria Daulat Bagh have colourful frescoes in the style of Mysore paintings

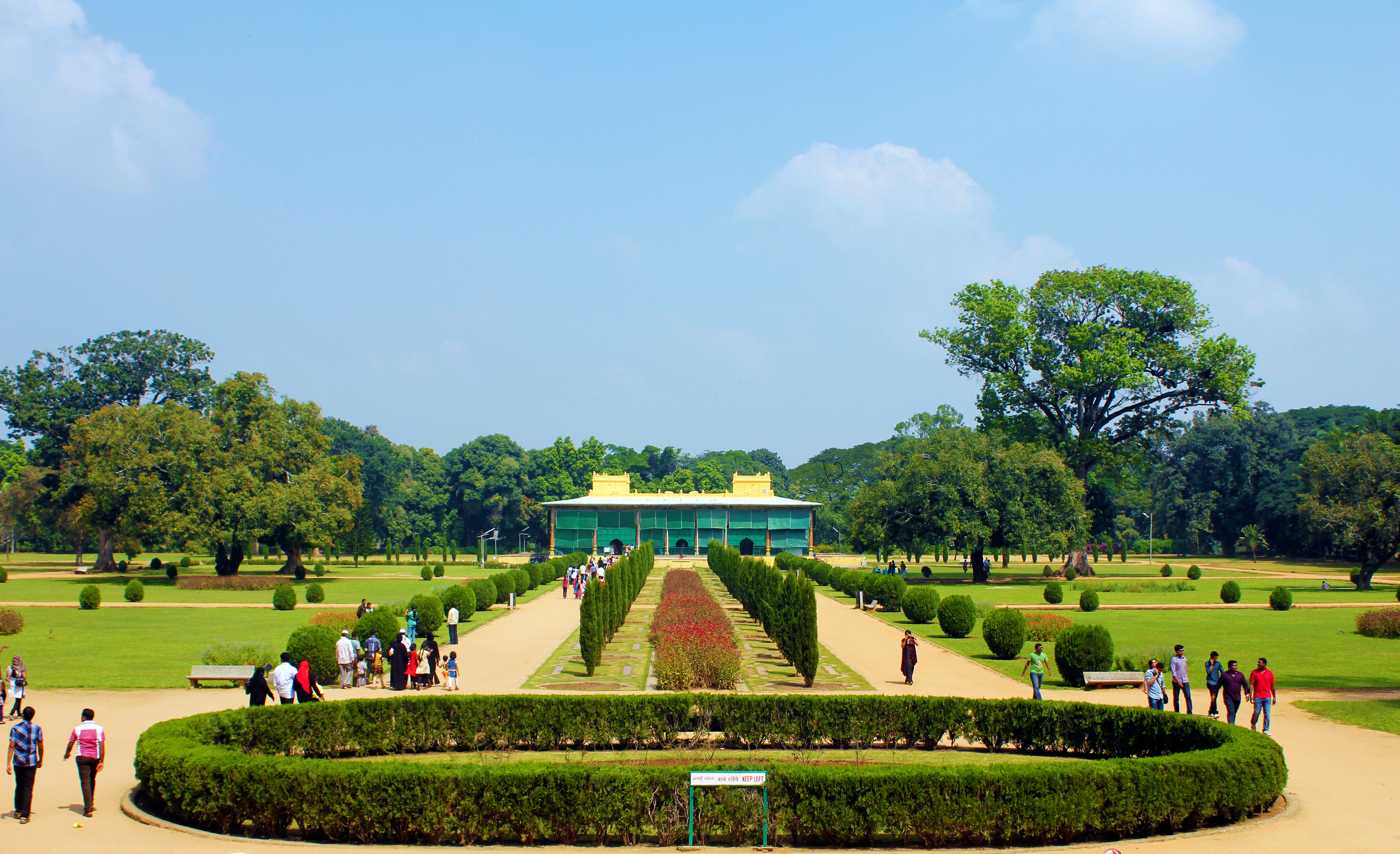
View from the entrance

Daria Daulat Bagh (literally "Garden of the Sea of Wealth') is a palace located in the city of Srirangapatna, near Mysore in southern India. It is mostly made of teakwood.

== Description ==
Srirangapatna is an island in the river Kaveri, about 14 km from Mysore. In Srirangapatna is the Dariya Daulat Palace (Summer Palace) that is set amidst beautiful gardens called Daria Daulat Bagh. Tippu Sultan popularly known as the "Tiger of Mysore", built this palace in 1784 and ruled Mysore from here for a short time after his father Hyder Ali wrested power from the Wodeyars in the middle of the 18th century. The palace is built in the Deccani style and is mostly made of teakwood. The palace has a rectangular plan and is built on a raised platform. There are open corridors along the four sides of the platform with wooden pillars at the edges of the plinth. The western and eastern wings have walls the other two wings have recessed bays with pillars supporting the roof. The four staircases are inconspicuous, built in the four partition walls that divide the audience hall into four rooms at four corners with a central hall connecting the eastern and western corridors.

All of the space available on the walls, pillars, canopies, and arches have colorful frescoes in the style of Mysore paintings. The outer walls of the palace have frescoes of the battle scenes and portraits. The inner walls are decorated with scrolls of thin foliage and floral patterns. The wooden ceilings of the palace are pasted with canvas painted with floral patterns. On the western wall are painting that depicts the celebrated victory achieved by Haider Ali and Tippu Sultan over the English led by Colonel Bailee in the Battle of Pollilur near Kanchipuram in 1780. The panels on the left wing depict the armies led by Haider Ali and Tippu Sultan going to battle and on the right wing Colonel Bailee is shown seated in a palanquin troubled, with the English army surrounding him, besieged by the army of Tippu Sultan. There is a painting at the extreme top right, of French soldiers led by Colonel Lally, who is looking through a telescope. The top panels show the Nizam of Hyderabad and his army of horsemen and elephants arriving a little too late to help his allies, the English. The eastern wall has paintings in five rows representing the scenes of Darbars of different contemporaries of Tippu Sultan including the Hindu Rani of Chitor, the Raja of Tanjore, the Raja of Benares, Balaji Rao II Peshwa, Magadi Kepegowda and Madakari Nayaka of Chitradurga and Krishnaraja Wodeyar II.

On the top floor of the Daria Daulat Palace is the Tippu Sultan Museum. It has a collection of Tippu memorabilia, European paintings, and Persian manuscripts. The museum has the painting Storming of Srirangapattanam, an oil painting by Sir Robert Ker Porter made in 1800. This historical painting depicts the final fall of Srirangapatana on 4 May 1799. Tippu's men are seen giving stiff resistance to the British army and many British officers are clearly visible in the painting. In the background behind the fort walls are seen parts of the Palace and the minarets of the mosque. Close by is Tippu's fort that lies in ruins now. It is in this fort that Tippu died fighting the British. In the fort are the Jama Masjid and the Ranganathaswamy Temple. Tippu's Palace, the Lal Mahal, lies in ruins nearby. Outside the fort is the Gumbaz that contains Tippu's tomb, his father Haider Ali's tomb and his mother's tomb.
