= Mysore silk =

Variety of mulberry silk produced in the Indian district of Mysore

Mysore Silk
- Geographical indication
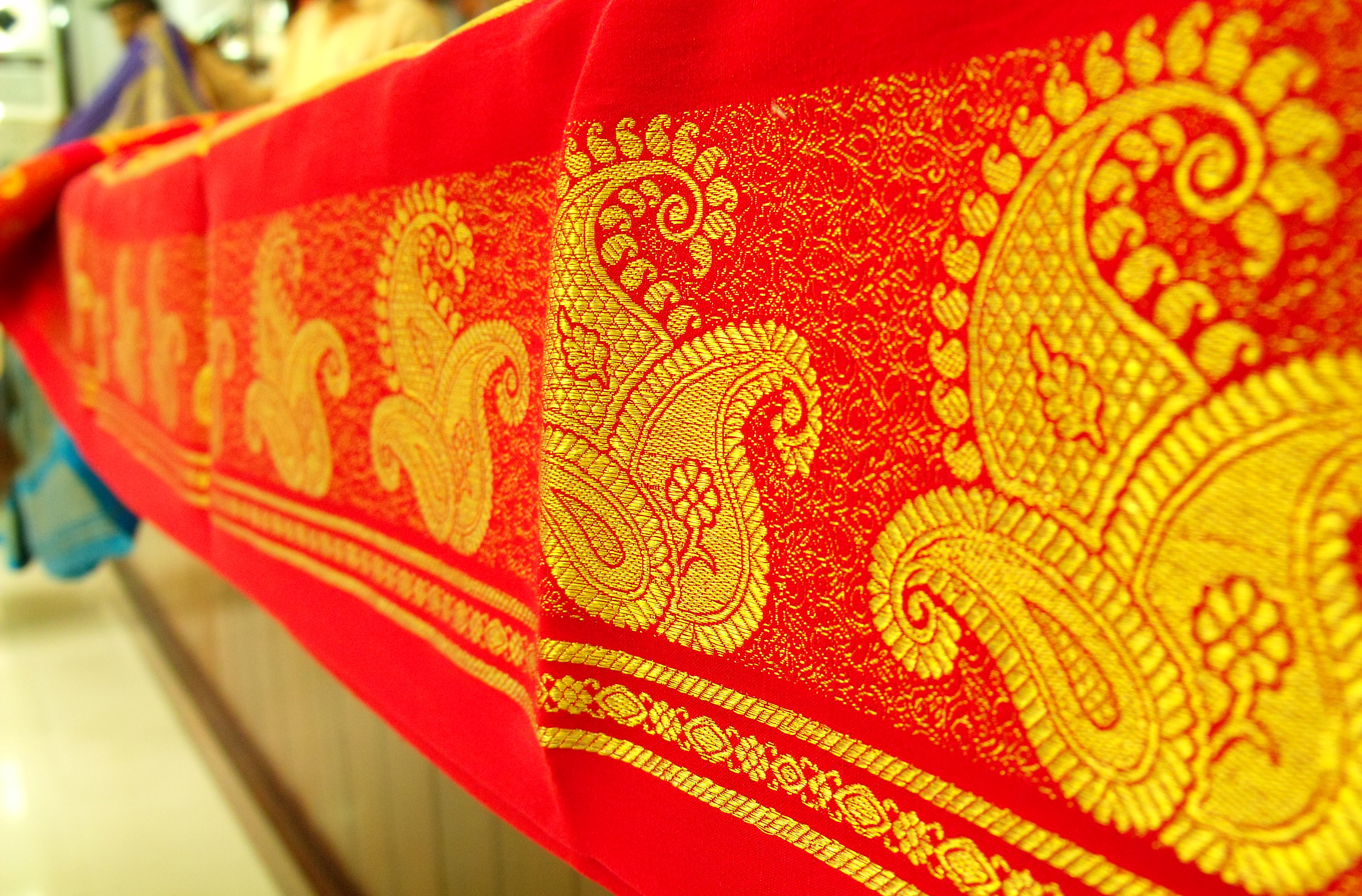
- Mysore Silk saree with gold inlay
- Description: Silk sarees weaved in Mysore
- Type: Handicraft
- Area: Mysore, Karnataka
- Country: India
- Material: Silk
- Official website: http://www.ksicsilk.com

Mysore silk is a variety of mulberry silk associated with Mysore, Karnataka, India. The silk industry in the Mysore region, which had declined after the fall of the Vijayanagara Empire, was revived during the reign of Tipu Sultan in the late 18th century.

Modern production is associated with the Karnataka Silk Industries Corporation Limited (KSIC), whose Mysore silk factory was founded in 1912 by Nalvadi Krishnaraja Wodeyar and transferred to KSIC in 1980. The factory produces silk sarees and other garments, using silk cocoons sourced principally from Ramanagara district and processed before weaving in Mysore. Mysore silk has received geographical indication status.

== History ==
After the fall of Vijayanagara Empire the silk industry in Mysore region went into decline, the growth of the silk industry in the Kingdom of Mysore was reinitiated during the reign of Tipu Sultan nearly 1780-1790AC. Later, it was hit by a global depression and had to compete with imported silk and rayon. In the second half of the 20th century, it revived and the Mysore State became the top multivoltine silk producer in India. Mysore silk is also known as mulberry silk because the silk cultivators would generally use mulberry leaves for silkworms to feed over.

== About ==
Karnataka produces 9,000 metric tons of mulberry silk, accounting for nearly 45% of the country's total mulberry silk production.

Mysore silk is produced by the Karnataka Silk Industries Corporation Limited (KSIC). The factory was founded in 1912 by Sri Nalvadi Krishnaraja Wodeyar, the Maharaja of Mysore. Initially, the silk fabrics were manufactured & supplied to meet the requirements of the royal family and ornamental fabrics to their armed forces. After India gained independence, the Mysore State Sericulture Dept. took control of the silk weaving factory. In 1980, the factory was handed over to KSIC, a government of Karnataka industry. Mysore silk has also received geographical identification.

== Process ==
The Mysore Silk factory in Mysore is responsible for weaving and distributing silk products. The main source of silk for the factory is Ramanagara district in Karnataka. Farmers from various parts of this district market silk cocoons there every day. KSIC officials purchase silk cocoons at the market through a government bidding process and send them to the raw silk production factory located in T.Narasipura. At this factory, the silk cocoons are boiled to extract threads and converted into thread rolls which are sent to the weaving factory located in Mysore. These threads are then used to produce Mysore silk products, including sarees.

The zari used in Mysore silk sarees contains 65% pure silver and 0.65% gold.

== See also ==
- Art silk
- Bombyx mori
- History of silk
- Mommes
- Rayon
- Silk in the Indian subcontinent
- Silk Road
- Spider silk
- Tenun Pahang Diraja
- Ilkal saree
- Mysore Sandal Soap
