= Shah Rasheed Ahmed Quadri =

Indian craftsman

Shah Rasheed Ahmed Quadari
- Born: June 5, 1955 (age 70); Bidar, Karnataka
- Occupation: Craftsman
- Known for: Bidriware
- Awards: Padma Shri (2023); Rajyotsava Prashasti (2006)

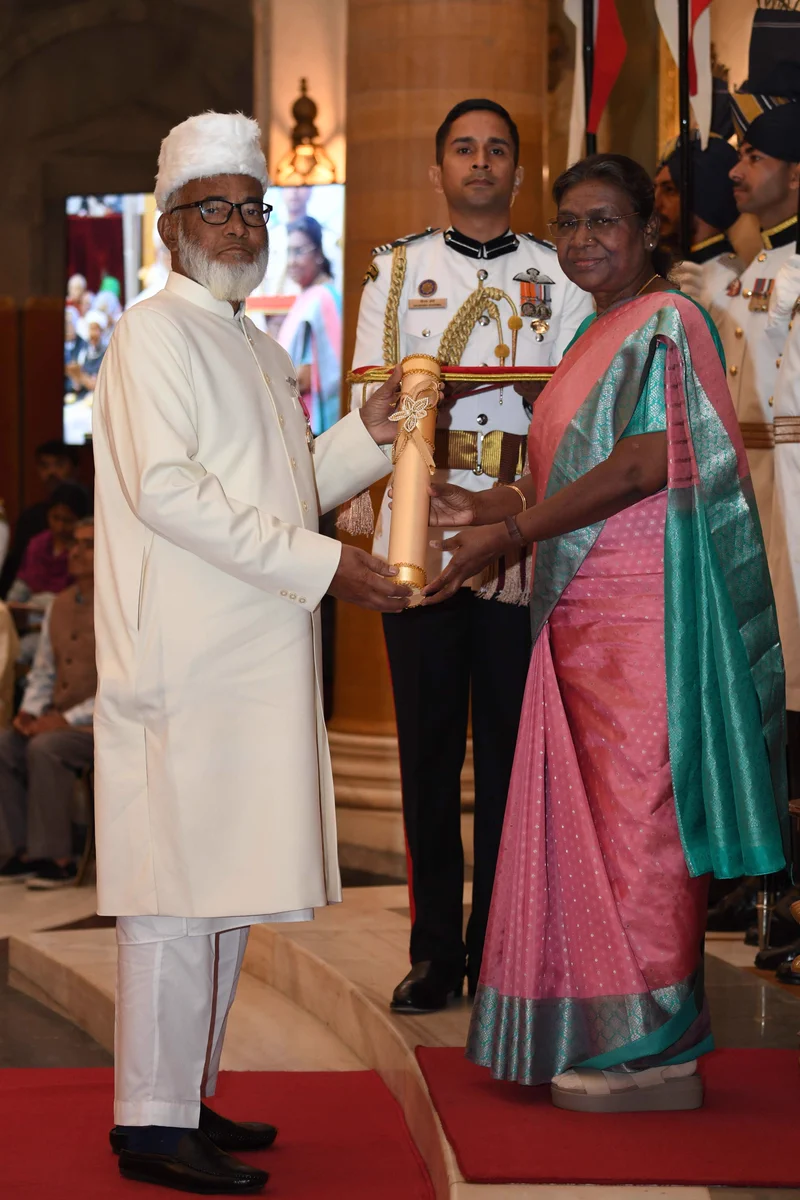
President Droupadi Murmu presents Padma Shri to Shri Shah Rasheed Ahmed Quadri

Shah Rasheed Ahmed Quadri is an Indian bidriware craftsman. He is known for keeping the 500-year-old art alive. He was awarded Padma Shri by President Droupadi Murmu.

== Early life ==
Shah Rasheed Ahmed Quadari was born on 5 June 1955 in Bidar, Karnataka. He was trained under his father, Shah Mustafa Quadri.

== Awards ==
He has received several awards, including the Rajyotsava Prashasti in 2006. In 2023, he was awarded the Padma Shri.

== See also ==
- Bahmani Sultanate
