= Mysore Sandal Soap =

Indian brand of soap

Mysore Sandal Soap is a brand of soap manufactured by the Karnataka Soaps and Detergents Limited (KSDL), a company owned by the government of Karnataka in India. This soap has been manufactured since 1916, when Krishna Raja Wadiyar IV, the king of Mysore, set up the Government Soap Factory in Bangalore. The main motivation for setting up the factory was the excessive sandalwood reserves that the Mysore Kingdom had, which could not be exported to Europe because of the First World War. In 1918, KSDL was incorporated as a company by merging the Government Soap Factory with the sandalwood oil factories at Shimoga and Mysore. Mysore Sandal Soap is a soap brand known for using sandalwood oil as its main ingredient. KSDL owns a geographical indication tag for the soap, which protects the use of the Mysore Sandal Soap brand name. In 2006, Indian cricketer Mahendra Singh Dhoni was selected as the first brand ambassador of Mysore Sandal Soap.

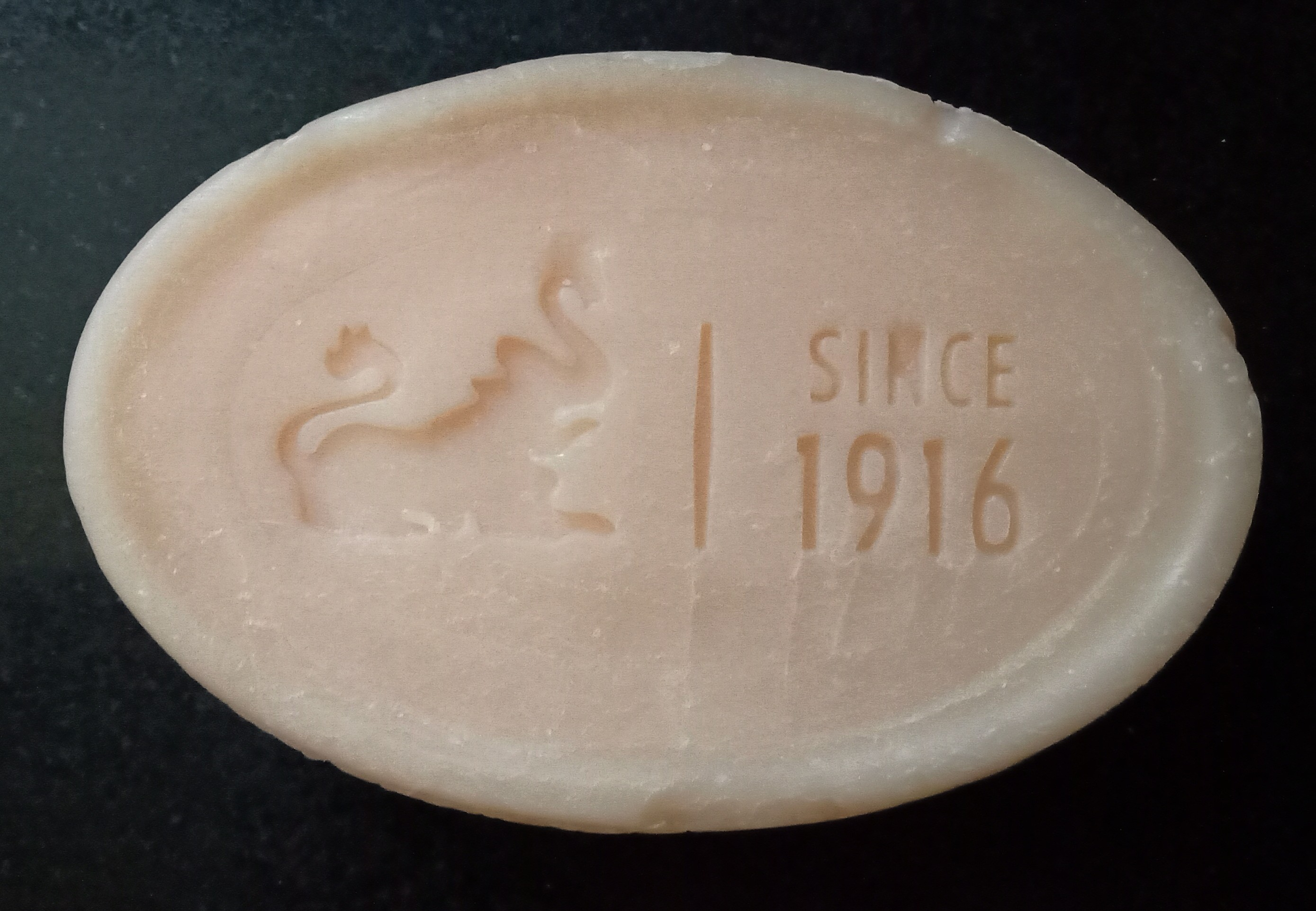
A Mysore Sandal bar soap (2016)

== History ==
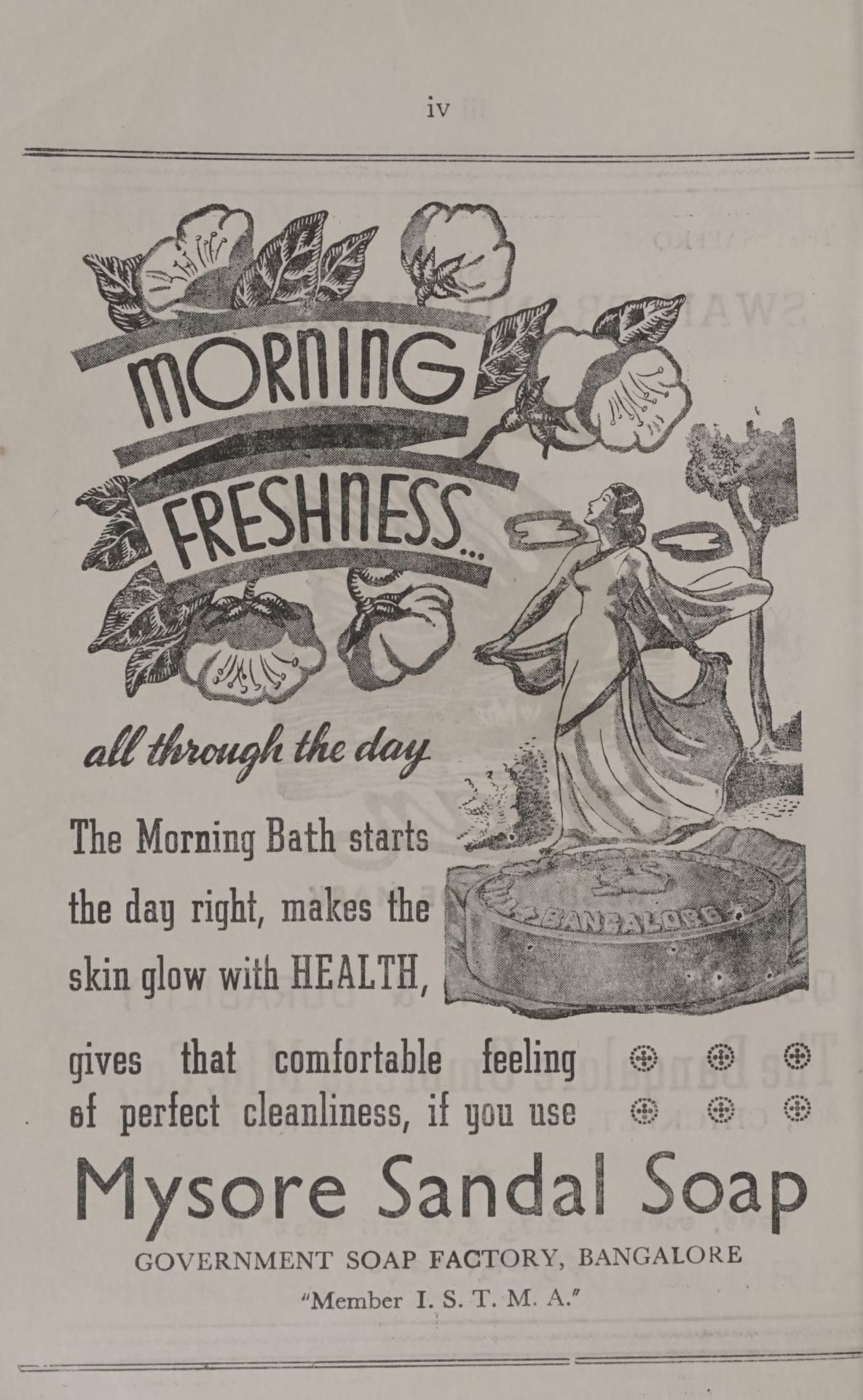
Mysore Sandal Ad from 1956

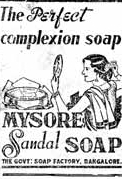
An advertisement for Mysore Sandal Soap in the English magazine Justice published in Madras Presidency (August 30, 1937)

In the early 20th century, the Mysore Kingdom in India was one of the largest producers of sandalwood in the world. It was also one of the major exporters of the wood, most of which was exported to Europe. During the First World War, large reserves of sandalwood were left over because they could not be exported due to the war. To make good use of these reserves, Nalvadi Krishnaraja Wodeyar, the king of Mysore, Diwan Sir M. Vishweshwaraiah and Sri S.G.Shastri established the Government Soap Factory in Bangalore.

In 1913, Sir M Visvesvaraya was nominated to the Council of IISc. This association had an immediate impact on the nature of research at IISc. In less than five years, six factories were started. The most successful of these were the sandalwood oil and the soap factories.

This factory, which was set up in 1916, started manufacturing soaps under the brand name Mysore Sandal Soap using sandalwood oil as the main ingredient. A factory to distill sandalwood oil from the wood was set up at Mysore in the same year. In 1944, another sandalwood oil factory was set up at Shimoga. After the unification of Karnataka, these factories came under the jurisdiction of the government of Karnataka. In 1980, the Government decided to merge these factories and incorporate them under a company named Karnataka Soaps and Detergents Limited. Sharabha, a mythological creature having the body of a lion and the head of an elephant, was chosen as the logo of the company because the creature represents the combined virtues of wisdom, courage, and strength and symbolizes the company's philosophy. The company has since diversified, and manufactures incense sticks, talcum powder, and detergents, apart from soaps.

== Business ==
In 2006, the KSDL factory accounted for 6500-tonnes of the total production of 450,000 tonnes of soap from India. The KSDL's soap factory has an installed capacity to produce 26,000 tonnes of soap per year. In 2004-2005, the factory sold Rs 1.15 billion (about US$28.75 million), with the Sandal Soap accounting for an average monthly sale of about Rs. 75 million ($1.87 million). The company expanded its advertising and marketing activities in 2006, when cricketer M. S. Dhoni was selected as the first brand ambassador. Other marketing strategies included a distributor incentive scheme in which distributors who met sales targets could enter a draw for silver or gold coins. About 85% of the sales of this soap are from the South Indian states of Karnataka, Andhra Pradesh, and Tamil Nadu. The product has had lower adoption among younger consumers in India. Apart from the regular Mysore Sandal Soap, KSDL has also introduced Mysore Sandal baby soap to target this market segment. A shortage of sandalwood has reduced production and resulted in the factory operating at approximately 25% of its manufacturing capacity. The main reason for this is the depletion of sandalwood reserves in Karnataka.

A Mysore Sandal outlet in Majestic, Bengaluru (2026)

To overcome this, KSDL has also started procuring sandalwood by bidding in the open market and is also considering importing the wood from other countries. The absence of a sustained sandalwood regeneration program has contributed to the depletion of sandalwood reserves in Karnataka.

The company celebrated its centennial on 10 May 2016. It planned a celebration to commemorate the year and included plans to introduce a Mysore Sandal Centennial Soap to mark the occasion. Karnataka Soaps had an event on 10 May 2016 to commemorate the 100th year.

The makers of Mysore Sandal Soap launched a new range of soaps under the brand name Mysoap on 4 November 2017, with variants including Rose Milk Cream, Jasmine Milk Cream, Orange Lime, Cologne Lavender, and Fruity Floral. Each variety features packaging depicting Indian women in traditional attire. The soap weighs 100g.

== See also ==
- Mysore Sandalwood Oil
- Mysore Agarbathi
- Mysore pak
- Bidriware
- Mysore Rosewood Inlay
- List of cleaning products
