= Mysore Agarbathi =

Type of incense sticks made in India

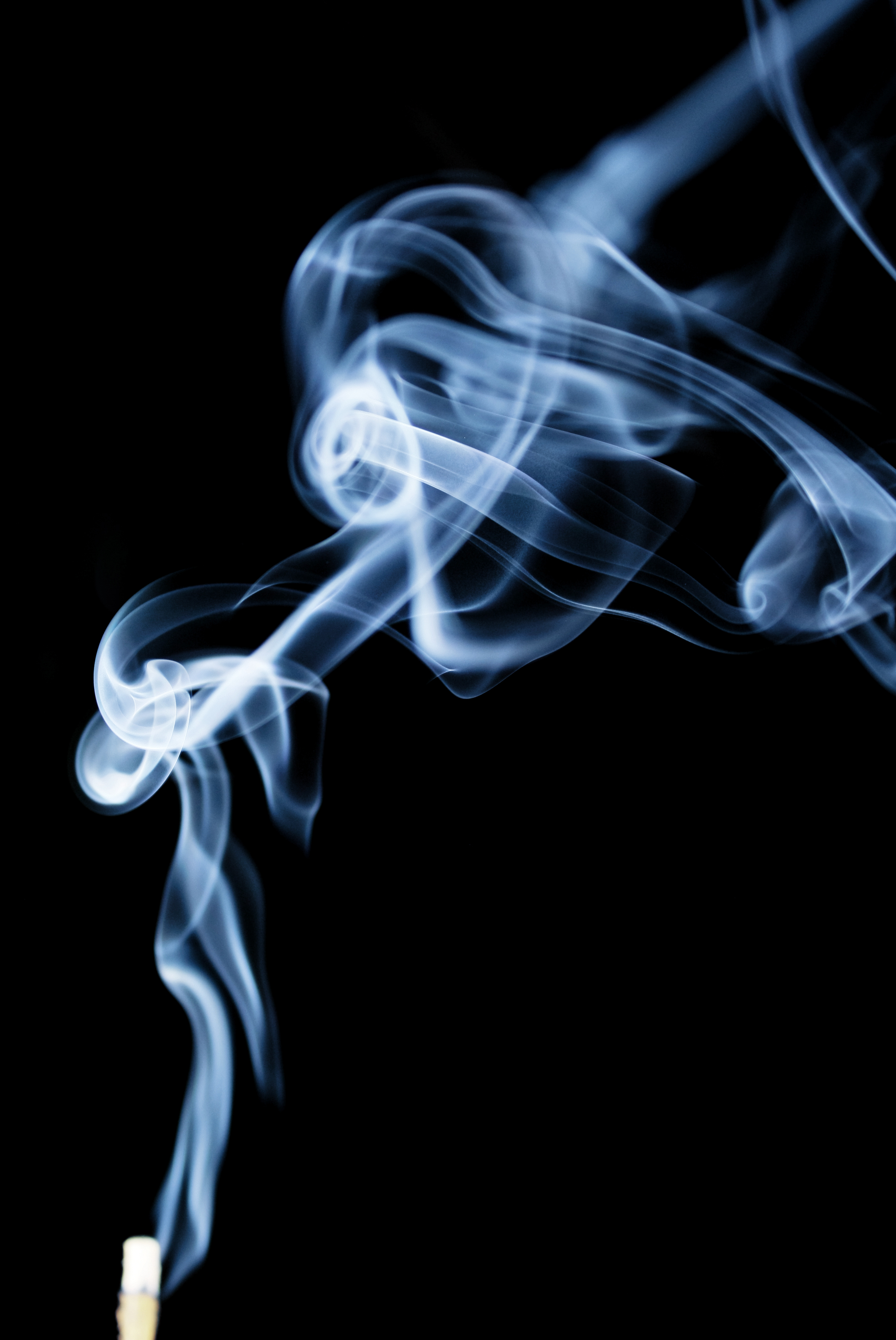
Incense burning fragrance from its material

Mysore Agarbathi is a variety of incense sticks manufactured at Mysore using locally grown ingredients which was found only in state of Karnataka. This incense has been awarded a Geographical Indication tag from the Government of India in 2005, due to its historic background and remote availability of material used.

== History ==
The making of incense sticks, also called 'agarbathi' in Hindi, became an organised industry in Bangalore during the 1900s and was locally known as oodabathies (blowing fumes). The incense sticks were very simple to manufacture, as it was only a paste of natural ingredients mixed with charcoal and Gijit, and rolled on to bamboo sticks. The proportion of mixing was of main importance. The Maharaja of Mysore patronised the production and promotion of the incense sticks. When they were given a certificate of merit from the Wembley exhibition in London, the Kingdom of Mysore gave the incense sticks as gifts to foreign visitors and guests, to encourage exports to other countries.

== Method of manufacturing ==
Herbs, flowers, Essential oil, barks, roots, charcoal are finely grinded into smooth paste and then rolled on to a bamboo stick and then dried undersun, special wood like sandalwood, Ailanthus malabaricum which yields halmadi and other natural ingredients were geographically only available in Karnataka before which gives special geographical indications

== Geographical indication ==
The all India agarbhati association proposed the registration of Mysore Agarbathi under the Geographical Indications of Goods Act, 1999, to the Office of the Controller-General of Patents, Designs and Trademarks, Chennai, in order to make it exclusive the manufacturers of insence sticks who use only local available natural ingredients from the region to use the name Mysore. It was granted the Geographical Indication status, three years later, in 2005.

== See also ==
- Mysore Sandalwood Oil
- Mysore Sandal Soap
- Mysore pak
- Navalgund Durries
- Coorg Green Cardamom
- List of Geographical Indications in India
- Incense Route
- Kōdō, incense arts
