= Channapatna toys =

Toys made in Channapatna, Karnataka, India

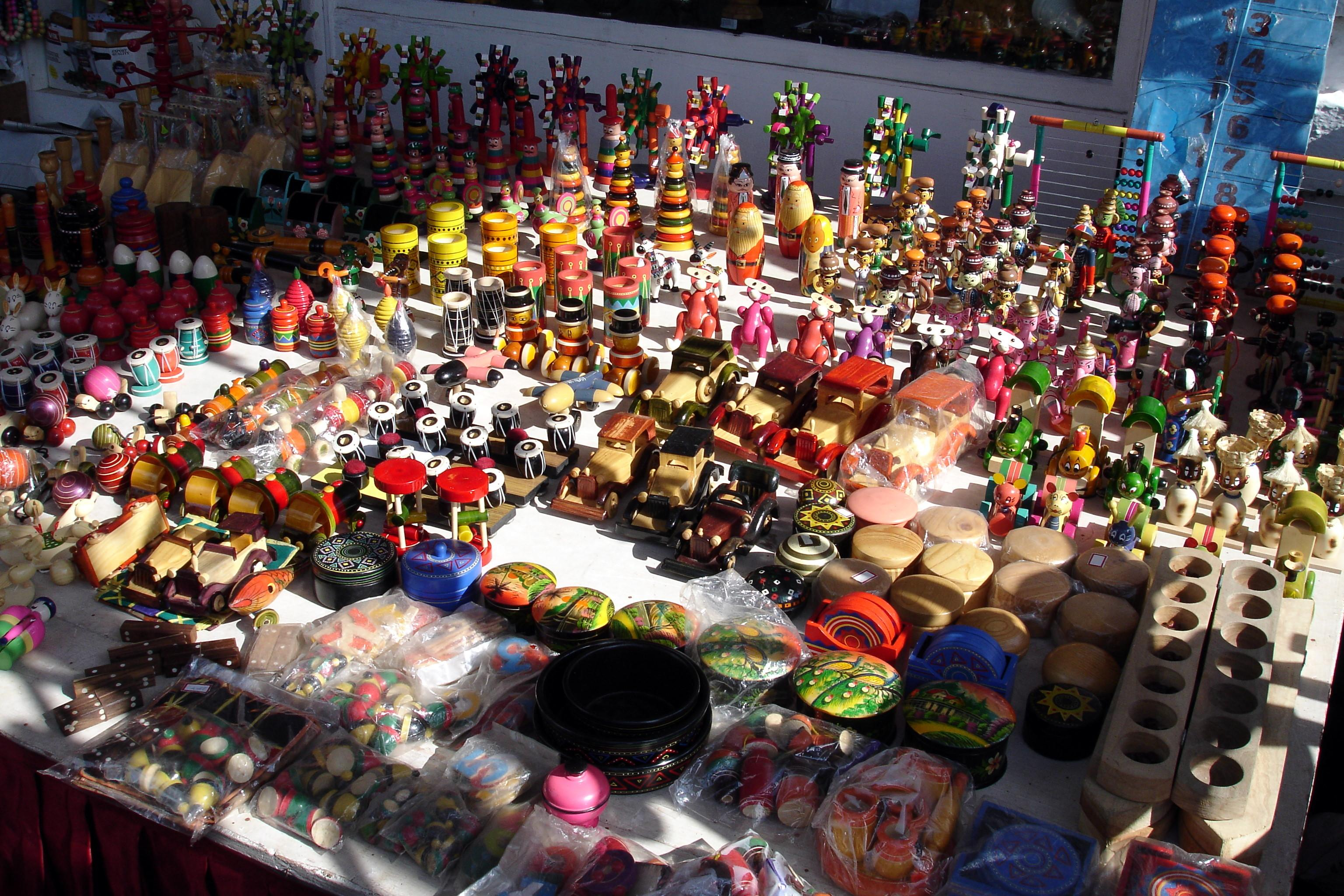
An assortment of Channapatna toys and dolls

Channapatna toys are a particular form of wooden toys and dolls that are manufactured in the town of Channapatna in the Ramanagara district of Karnataka state, India. This traditional craft is protected as a geographical indication (GI) under the World Trade Organization, administered by the Government of Karnataka. As a result of the popularity of these toys, Channapatna is known as the Gombegala Ooru (toy-town) of Karnataka. Traditionally, the work involved lacquering the wood of the Wrightia tinctoria tree, colloquially called Aale mara (ivory-wood).

== History ==
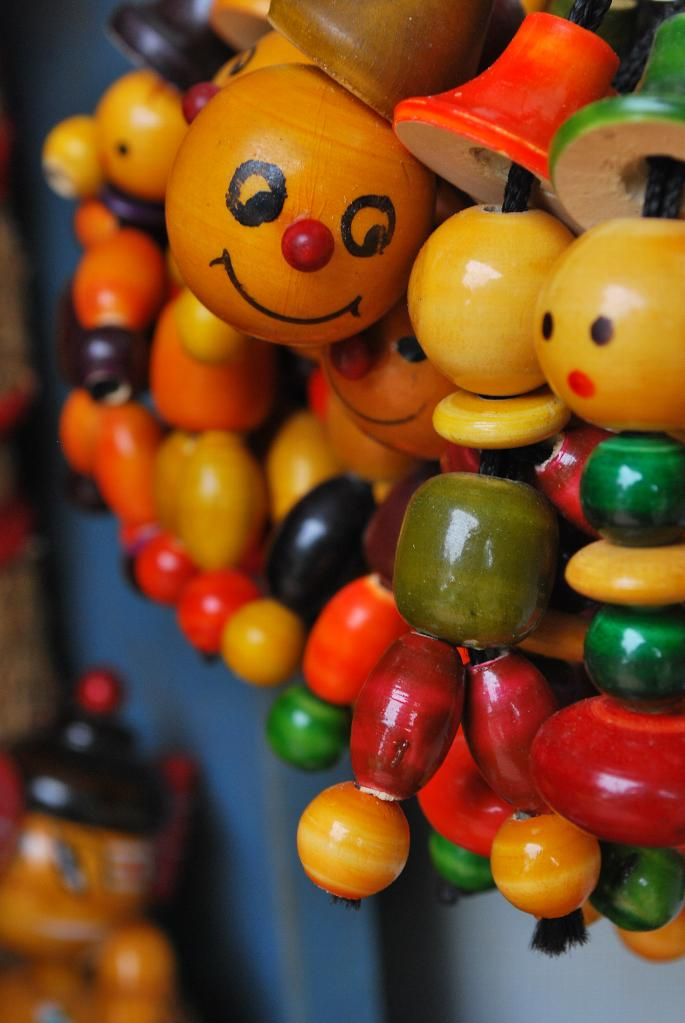
Channapatna toys

The greater prominence of the Channapatna toys can be traced to patronage from Tipu Sultan, the historic ruler of Mysore, though these toys existed before this period historically given as gifts as part of Dusshera celebrations. It is known that he was an ardent admirer of arts, and in particular of woodwork. The art underwent dramatic changes over the years. Later, a man by the name of Bavas Miyan undertook the responsibility to introduce Japanese doll making techniques to improve production and reduce the effort that went into making each piece of toy. For nearly two centuries, ivory-wood was the main wood used in the making of these toys, though rosewood and sandalwood were also occasionally used.

== Manufacturing ==
The craft has diversified over time; in addition to the traditional ivory-wood, other woods—including rubber, sycamore, cedar, pine and teak—are now used as well. Manufacturing stages include procuring the wood, seasoning the wood, cutting the wood into the desired shapes, pruning and carving the toys, applying the colours and finally polishing the finished product. Vegetable dyes are used in the colouring process to ensure that the toys and dolls are safe for use by children. As of Oct 2011, Channapatna had a population of 71,902, in which 254 in home manufacturing units and 50 in small factories, were engaged in the making of these toys. The Karnataka Handicrafts Development Corporation (KHDC) provides assistance with marketing efforts. The oldest and most popular manufacturing unit Bharath art and crafts help develop innovative products.

== Growth ==
With no proper back up or marketing, the Channapatna toy industry faced a financial crunch for more than a decade and was almost on the verge of dying out. However, with the help of KHDC, the craft has been revived and the artisans involved are being trained on changing trends in the industry, to help them keep a breast of the current scenario. Prototypes designed by master craftsmen are introduced to the local artisans, who use them to create well-designed toys and dolls. The Government of Karnataka has also provided help by constructing a Lacquerware Craft Complex, which has a manufacturing centre with 32 turning lathe machines. Financial assistance to the artisans, with help from the Dutch Government and the Karnataka Government's Vishwa scheme has also been provided.

Many new companies and social enterprises have been reviving the Channapatna craft to suit modern tastes. iFolk Channapatna toys and handicrafts, few manufacturing units promotes and supports lacquerware artisans to do innovation and modernisation of their products. In 2022, KSR Bangalore City railway station set up a dedicated stall for the toys as a pilot study.

== See also ==
- Tipu's Tiger
- Bidriware
- Ilkal saree
- Kinnal Craft
- Mysore Agarbathi
- Mysore Sandalwood Oil
- Navalgund Durries
