= Bidriware =

Indian metal handicraft

- Geographical indication
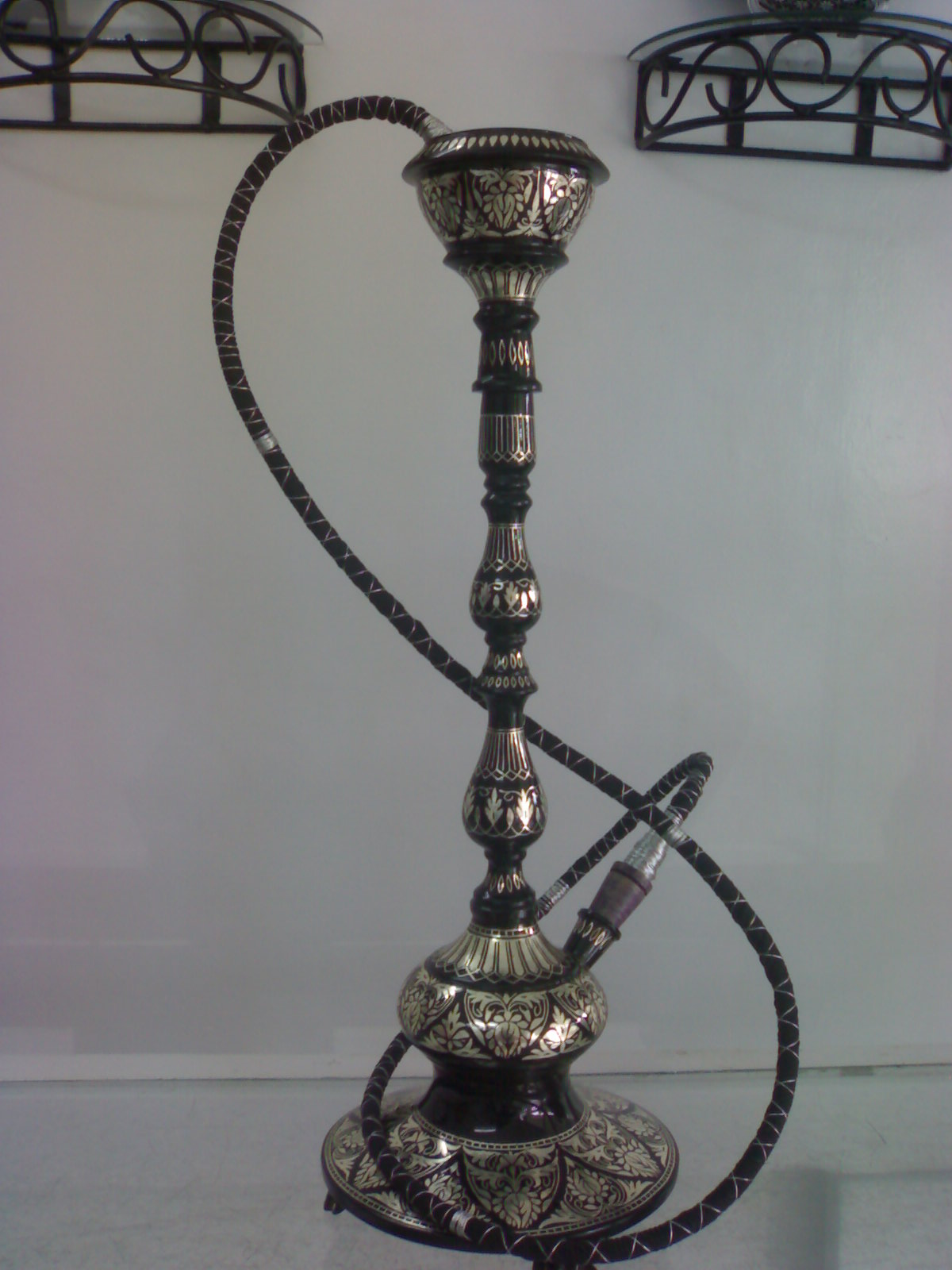
- Bidri art Hookah
- Type: Metal handicraft
- Area: Bidar, Karnataka
- Country: India
- Registered: 3 January 2006
- Material: Alloy of zinc and copper, silver

Bidriware is a metal handicraft from the city of Bidar in Karnataka, India. It was developed in the 14th century C.E. during the rule of the Bahmani Sultans. The term "bidriware" originates from the township of Bidar, which is still the chief center of production. The metal used is white brass that is blackened and inlaid with silver. As a native art form, Bidriware obtained a Geographical Indications (GI) registry on 3 January 2006.

== Origins ==
A end 17th century, Bidriware hookah base at Louvre

The origin of Bidriware is usually attributed to the Bahamani sultans who ruled Bidar in the 14th–15th centuries. Bidriware techniques and style are influenced by Persian art. The art form developed in the kingdom that was a mix of Turkish, Persian and Arabic influences which were intermingled with the local styles and thus a unique style of its own was born. Abdullah bin Kaiser, a craftsman from Iran was invited by the Sultan Ahmed Shah Bahmani to work on decorating the royal palaces and courts. According to some accounts, Kaiser worked with local craftsmen and the partnership resulted in bidriware under the rule of Ahmed Shah and his son Second Alauddin Bahmani. Along with local artisans, the art spread far and wide and was handed over to generations as time passed.

== Bidri artisans ==
Bidri art researcher Rehaman Patel shares that the awardees also had shown their skills by exhibiting varieties of Bidri art in foreign countries.

There are craftsmen in this art practice who took this practice to national and international recognition. According to the census of India in 1961, Syed Tassaduq Hussain, a first National awardee in 1969, was the head of the Gulistan Cooperative Society in Bidar. The other notable national awardees are Abdul Hakeem, Mohammed Najeeb Khan, Shah Majeed Quadri, Mohammed Moizuddin, Mohammed Abdul Rauf and Mohammed Saleemuddin.

Shah Rasheed Ahmed Quadari is a recipient of several awards including a National award which he received in 1988, Karnataka state award in 1984, Rajyostava award in 2006, Great Indian Achievement award in 2004, and District Rajyotsava award in 1996. The Government of India awarded him with Shilp Guru award in 2015.

Shah Rasheed Ahmed Quadari, a 67-year-old Bidri craftsman was awarded Padma Shri Award in March 2023 by President Droupadi Murmu.

== Process of making bidriware ==
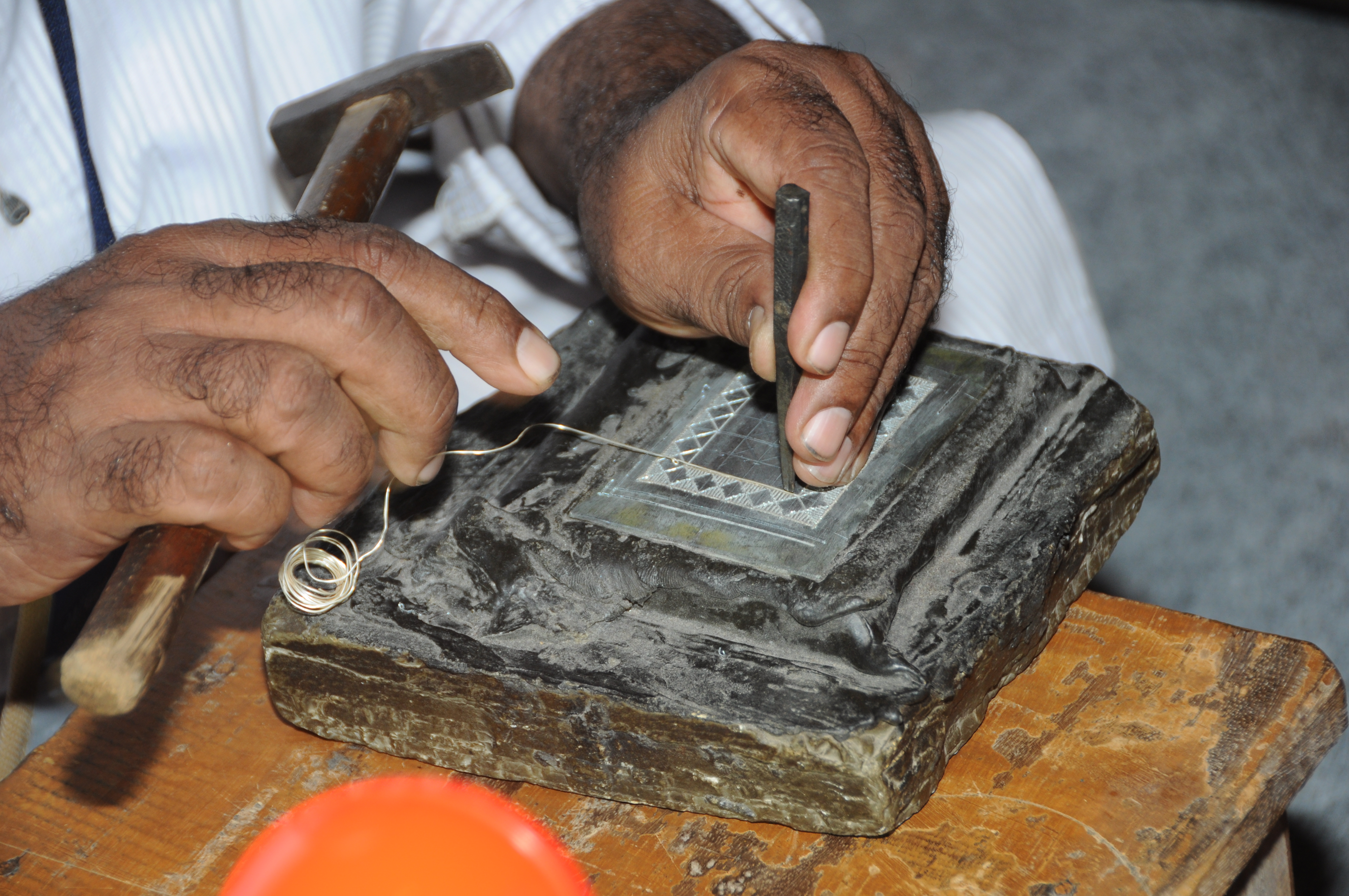
Craftsmen chiselling silver inlay in the metal alloy.

Bidriware undergoes an eight-stage process: moulding, smoothening by file, designing by chisels, engraving by chisel and hammer, pure silver inlaying, smoothening again, buffing and finally oxidising by soil and ammonium chloride.

Bidriware is made from cast white brass (copper-zinc ratio of 1:16). First, a mould is formed from soil made malleable by the addition of castor oil and resin. The molten metal is then poured into it to obtain a cast piece which is later smoothened by filing. The casting is now coated with a strong solution of copper sulphate to obtain a temporary black coating over which designs are etched freehand with the help of a metal stylus. This is then secured in a vise and the craftsman uses small chisels to engrave the design over the freehand etching. Fine wire or flattened strips of pure silver are then carefully hammered into these grooves.

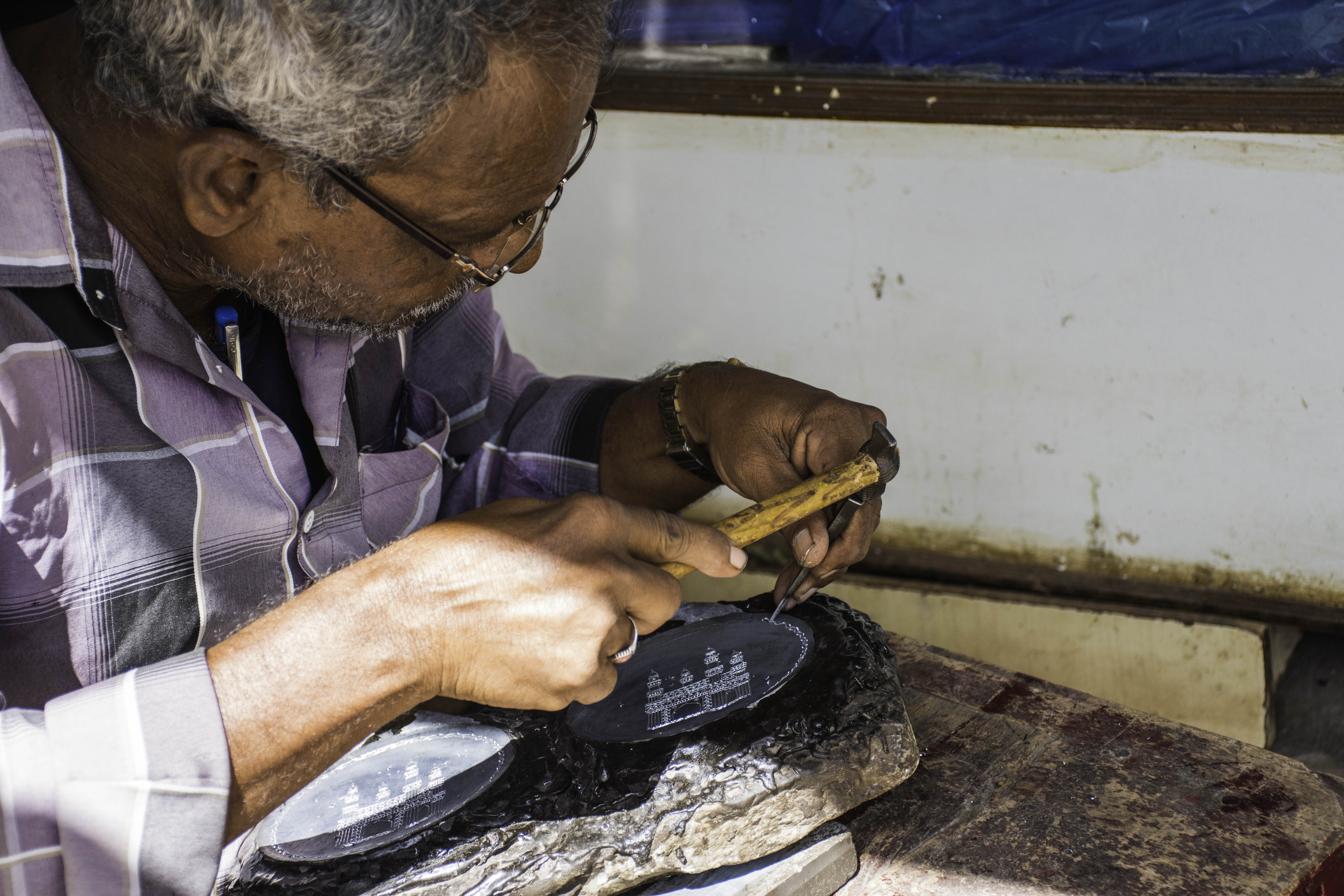
Bidriware craftsman doing silver inlay

The article then is filed, buffed and smoothed to get rid of the temporary black coating. This results in rendering the silver inlay hardly distinguishable from the white brass.

The bidriware is now ready for the final blackening process. Traditionally, the craftsmen of Bidar use soil taken from the grounds of a 15th century fort in Bidar, which is rich in potassium nitrate. The soil is mixed with ammonium chloride and water to produce a paste which is then rubbed onto a heated brass surface. The paste darkens the brass but not the silver inlay.

The black patina is a mixture of zinc oxide and copper(II) oxide (Cu_{2}O). It is the copper oxide that gives the patina its black color (zinc oxide is white). The ammonium chloride that is applied to the bidriware selectively dissolves the zinc on the surface of the brass, leaving a copper-rich surface that is oxidized by the potassium nitrate.

The paste then rinsed off to reveal a shiny silver design that is striking in contrast against the black surface. As a finishing touch, oil is applied to the finished product to deepen the matte coating. The finished product appears black with brilliant silver inlay.

== Technique and Design ==
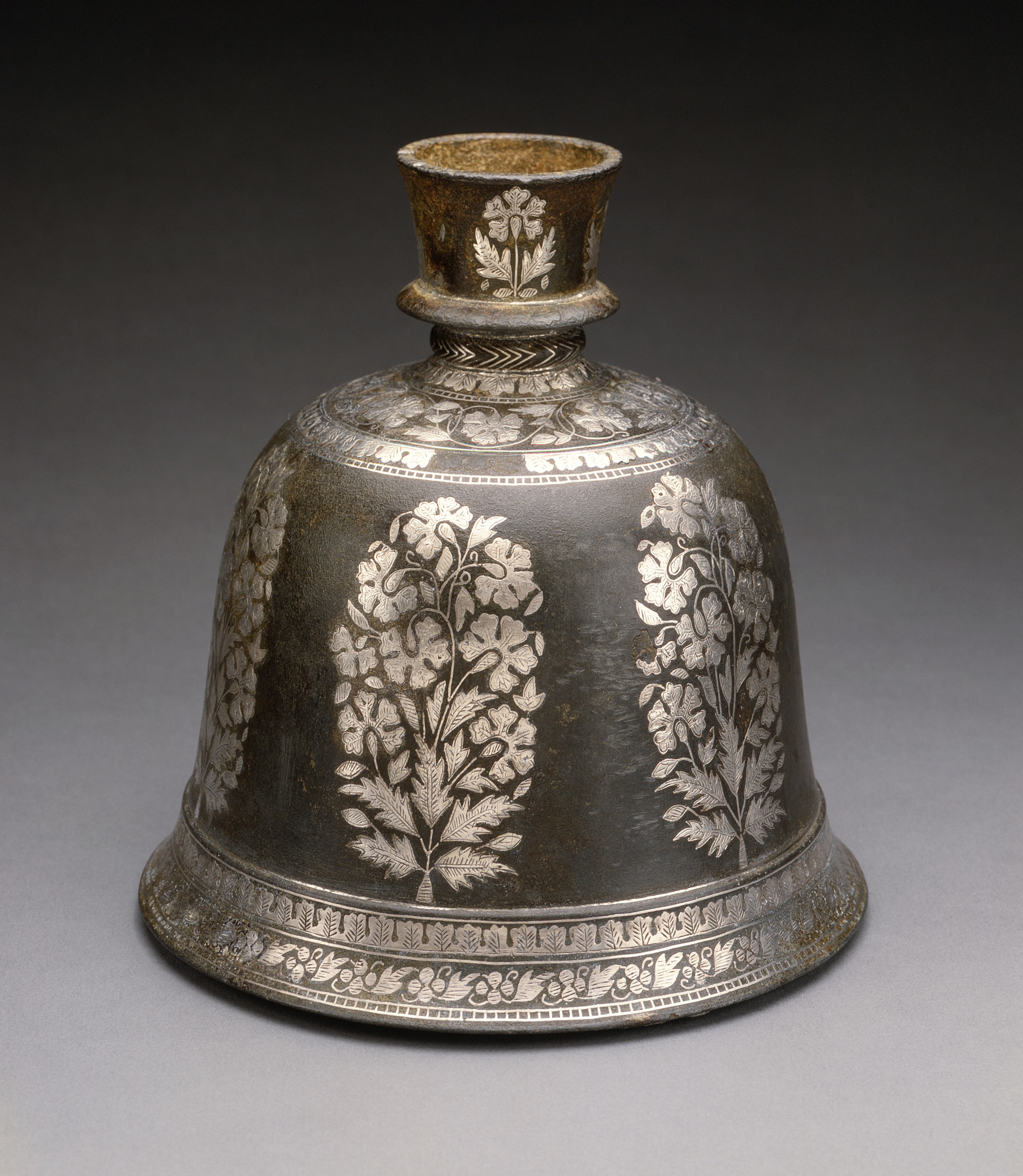
Bidriware hookah base from 18th century.

There are several techniques employed in making of bidriware, tarkashi (Inlay of sheets), tainishan (inlay of sheets), zarnishan (low relief), Zarbuland (high relief), aftabi (cut out design in overlaid material sheet). It is not compulsory to use a single technique for an object, generally two or more techniques are combined. Most common combination is tarkashi and tainishan, seldom combinations of zarnishan or tainishan and tarkashi or aftabi are also used in different compositions. Majorly silver inlay is used as it provides better contrast with black metal, in few cases copper or precious metal as gold is also used.

Most common types of motifs used are either floral or geometrical, with influences from Persian, Southern India, and later from Europe. Traditionally, flower motifs consists of asharfi-ki-booti, leaves (vine creepers), geometric designs, human figures, stylized poppy plants with flowers, etc. are commonly found on the items. Demand for the patterns of Persian roses and passages from the Quran in Arabic script are also in great demand in the West.

Earlier, bidriware was used for hookahs, paan-holders, and vases but now keepsakes, bowls, earrings, trays, ornament boxes, other jewelry and showpiece items are made from it.

In Aurangabad, artisans also make patterns of motifs from Ajanta Caves especially Ajanta Padmapani which have become very popular among foreign tourists

== Soil speciality ==
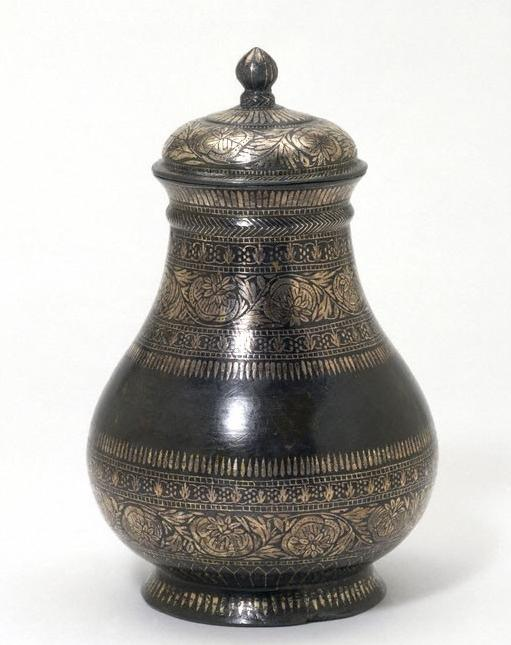
Cup with lid, Bidriware, ca 1850 V&A Museum

Bidri artisans blacken their wares using soil obtained from a 15th-century fort in Bidar. They say that in some parts of the fort, the soil does not receive sunlight or rain for years on end, and this gives the soil its desired properties. When the artisans go to the fort looking for such soil, they identify it by taste. The fort is a tourist attraction, protected from development but accessible to the public, and the guards do not mind the artisans sneaking out small quantities of soil every now and then.

Chemical analysis of the aforementioned soil shows it to be rich in alkaline nitrates. It is believed that the nitrates oxidize the copper in the brass to create copper(II) oxide, which is black in color. Sunlight breaks down nitrate, which would explain why the soil in the parts of the fort that are sheltered from sunlight is rich in nitrates.

== Innovations ==
This artistic metallic work is on the revival path after the introduction of innovative designs and a variety of new patterns. The designs range from Indian to international themes with the latest in home and lifestyle accessories. Innovative designs are developed by the National Institute of Fashion Technology (NIFT). Karnataka State Handicrafts Development Corporation Limited is keen on promoting the Bidri art form.

The traditional art which had limited set of designs is now diversifying to find a foothold in the present-day market with appeal to younger patrons. New items include USB drive covers, office stationery items such as paper clips, key bunches, lockets, envelope openers, pen stands, lampshades, and even floor tiles. National Institute of Design has come up with novel and lighter items that use less silver and therefore cost less.

== Bidriware in other places ==
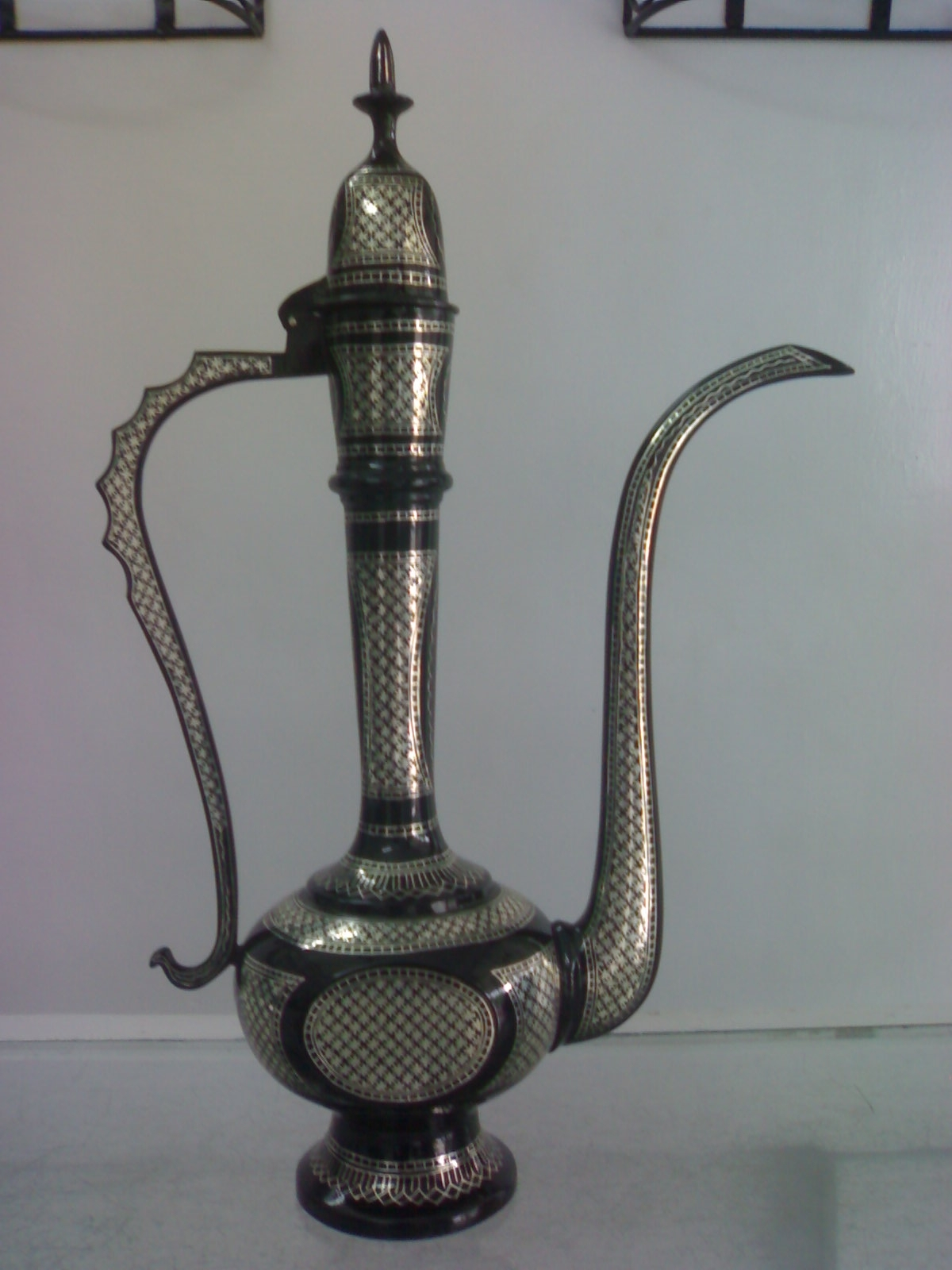
A Bidriware wine decanter

While Bidar in Karnataka and Hyderabad in Telangana are the most vibrant centers, this art is also practiced in few other parts of the country like Purnia in Bihar, Lucknow in Uttar Pradesh and Murshidabad in West Bengal. The designs are mostly conventional, including creepers, flowers and sometimes human figures.

In Bellori, a village near Purnia, local craftsmen known as the Kansaris are engaged in molding and turning bidri vessels. The sonars (goldsmith) then do the engraving and polishing. Also found here is the gharki, a less sophisticated variant of the Bidri. Another variant of the bidriwork can be seen in Lucknow's Zar Buland, where the ornamental designs are raised above the surface.

In Aurangabad, the Bidri art was introduced by the Nizam of Hyderabad as it was a part of Nizam's empire then. As Aurangabad has its own rich legacy of art and craft, the Bidri work mingled into the local arts soon.

== Research in Bidri art ==
Gulbarga-based artist Rehaman Patel has done extensive research on Bidri art, collecting evidence of the historical background of Bidri, methods of making Bidri, critical review of Bidri collections in India and non-Indian museums, and the introduction of Bidri artisans. Patel was a fellow of Karnataka Shilpakala Academy Bangalore for the year 2014–15. He submitted documentation on "International collection of Bidri Art".

The Indian Royal Academy of Art and Culture has published a book in Kannada title Karnatakada Bidri Kale (Bidri Art of Karnataka) under the financial assistance of the Department of Kannada and Culture, Government of Karnataka in the year 2012. An English version on Bidri art was published by Karnataka Historical Research Publication in 2017.

== See also ==
- Channapatna toys
- Dharwad pedha
- Kinnal craft
- Mattu gulla
- Mysore Sandal Soap
- Navalgund durries
