= Kinnal craft =

Traditional wooden craft of Karnataka, India

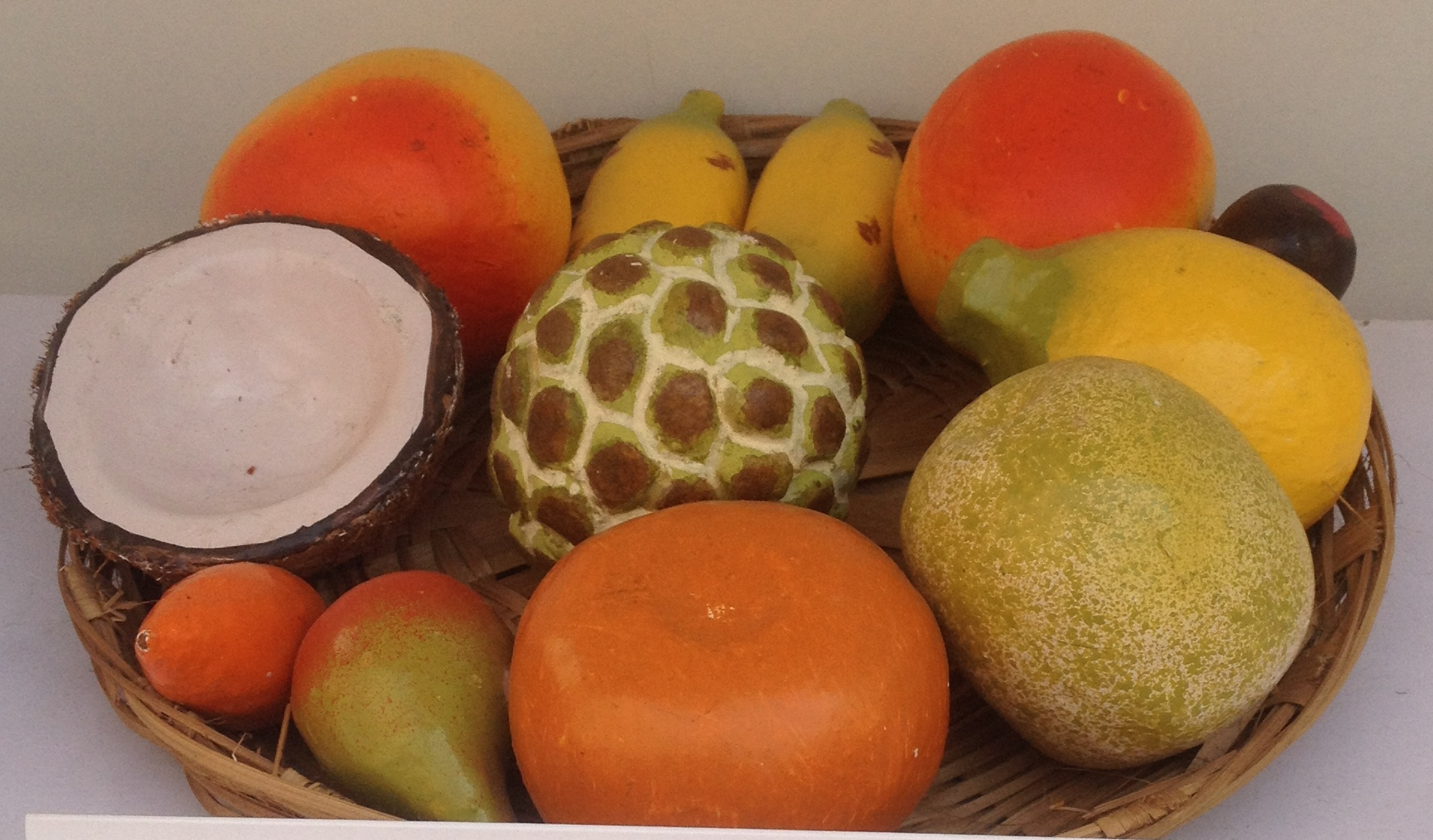
Kinnal toys

Kinnal craft or Kinhal craft (Kannada: ಕಿನ್ನಾಳ ಕಲೆ), is a traditional wooden craft local to the town of Kinnal (also spelled Kinhal) in Koppal District, Karnataka, India.

The town is famous for toys and religious idols. Recently, this craft has been granted Geographical Indication.

== History ==
Kinnal was once a flourishing centre for crafts, the most well-known being carvings in wood. The famous mural paintings in the Pampapateshwara Temple and the intricate work on the wooden chariot at Hampi are said to be the work of the ancestors of the Kinnal artisans of today. Old paper tracings found in the ancestral house of one of the artisans further substantiates this belief.

In 2007, students from the University of Glasgow and Glasgow School of Art in collaboration with the Crafts Council of Karnataka, facilitated a project with local students and craftsmen, in an attempt to revive the Kinnal craft.

== Method ==
The artisans are called chitragara. Lightweight wood is used for the toys. The paste used for joining the various parts is made of tamarind seeds and pebbles. Jute rags, soaked, slivered into pieces, dried, powdered, and mixed with saw dust and tamarind seed paste is made into kitta. A mixture of pebble powder paste with liquid gum is used for embossing the ornamentation and jewellery on the body of the figure. Once the components of the figure are assembled, kitta is applied by hand all over, and small pieces of cotton are stuck on it with the tamarind paste. Over this is applied the pebble paste which forms the base for the application of paint.

== See also ==
- Bidriware
- Channapatna toys
- Dharwad pedha
- Mattu gulla
- Navalgund durries
