= Mysore Sandalwood Oil =

Trademarked perfume oil

- Geographical indication
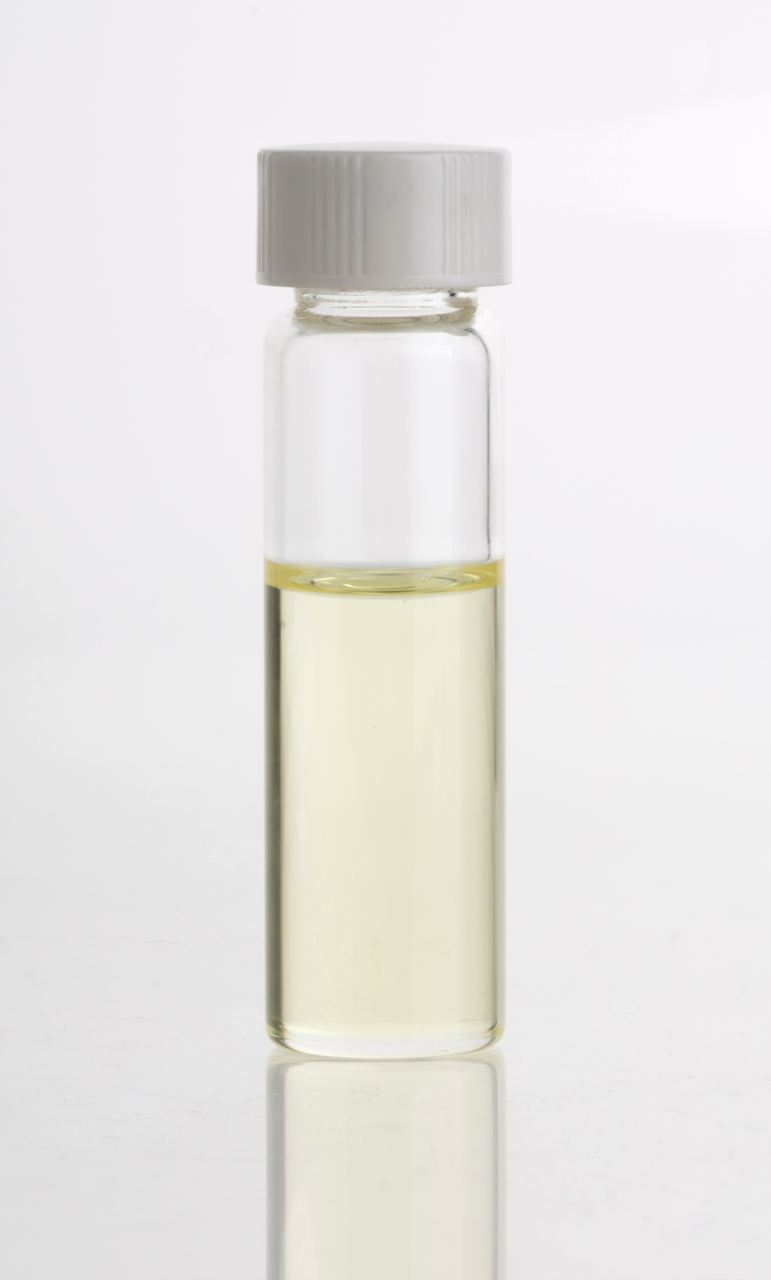
- A phial of Mysore Sandalwood Oil
- Type: perfumed oil extract
- Area: Mysore district
- Country: India
- Registered: 2005
- Official website: http://ipindia.nic.in

Mysore Sandalwood Oil is a trademarked perfume oil extracted from the Santalum album variety of sandalwood tree (also known as a "royal tree") in the Mysore district of Karnataka, India.

== History ==
Initially, sandalwood oil was extracted in India by crude methods. Before World War I, sandalwood from the Mysore district was distilled in Germany and sold there. However, when World War I broke out in 1914, this route of extraction had to be closed down, resulting in a loss of revenue to the exchequer. Due to this closure to the market, the Maharajah of Mysore appointed Alfred Chatterton, the director of industries in Mysore to develop the distillation of the oil. Chatterton enlisted the help of professors J. J. Sudborough and H. E. Watson who extracted the first sample of sandalwood oil in India at the Indian Institute of Science. In 1916–17, the sandalwood oil distillery was established in Mysore by the then Mysore government (now the Karnataka government) to distil oil from sandalwood. In 1977, the Mysore district had about 85,000 sandalwood trees, and production reported during 1985-86 was about 20,000 kilograms (44,000 lb) of raw sandalwood. To preserve its importance to the economy, according to the Government Gazetteer, the government introduced special laws and regulations. In the erstwhile princely state of Mysore (part of Karnataka since independence), sandal was a "royal tree", with the state government controlling it.

This oil has been registered for protection under the geographical indication of the Trade Related Intellectual Property Rights (TRIPS) agreement. In 2006, it was listed as "Mysore Sandalwood Oil" under the GI Act 1999 of the Government of India, with registration confirmed by the Controller General of Patents Designs and Trademarks.

== Uses ==
The heartwood or the trunk of the sandalwood tree and also its roots are used in the oil extraction process.

The oil is used in the manufacture of soaps, incense, scents, and cosmetics; it also has several uses in religious rites, skin and hair therapeutic treatments, and in pharmaceuticals. There are many varieties of sandalwood oil, and Mysore sandalwood oil was considered one of the best in 1938. The sandalwood oil produced in Mysore accounted for 70% of the world's sandalwood production in 1996. It is used as a "blender fixative" in the blending of many popular perfumes in the world. In 1942 it was assessed as having an assured minimum of 90% santalol, and of comparable standard to any sandalwood oil produced elsewhere.

According to Swami Vivekananda, Mysore was identified with sandalwood, which was integral to the religious, social and ceremonial life of the east. Vivekananda said "the lingering perfume of this wood may be truly said to have made its conquest of the world".

The heartwood of the tree, which is not affected by insects, has been used to fashion furniture and temple structures in India. Its oil has been considered an aphrodisiac, as its aroma has similarity with androsterone, a male hormone. In Ayurvedic medicine, sandalwood is used to combat urinary tract infections, prostate dysfunction, diarrhea, earache, and lung infections. Practitioners of traditional Chinese medicine use it to treat cholera, gonorrhea, and abdominal pain.

== See also ==
- Navalgund durries
- Coorg orange
- Byadagi chilli
- Dharwad pedha
- Mattu gulla
- Mysore pak
- Mysore silk

== Bibliography ==
- Dept, Mysore. Information (1938). Handbook. The University of Michigan.
- (India), Karnataka (1988). Karnataka State Gazetteer: Mysore. Director of Print, Stationery and Publications at the Government Press.
- Merrin, Archibald C. (1942). The Perfumery and Essential Oil Record Year Book & Diary. G. Street & Co.
- Pitman, Vicki (2004). Aromatherapy: A Practical Approach. Nelson Thornes. ISBN 978-0-7487-7346-6.
- Rangarajan, S. (22 March 1996). Frontline. Kasturi & Sons.
- Vivekananda, Swami (1943). Awakened India. Swami Smaranananda.
- Wilson, Roberta (2002). Aromatherapy: Essential Oils for Vibrant Health and Beauty. Penguin. ISBN 978-1-58333-130-9.
