= Mysore pak =

Sweet dish in India

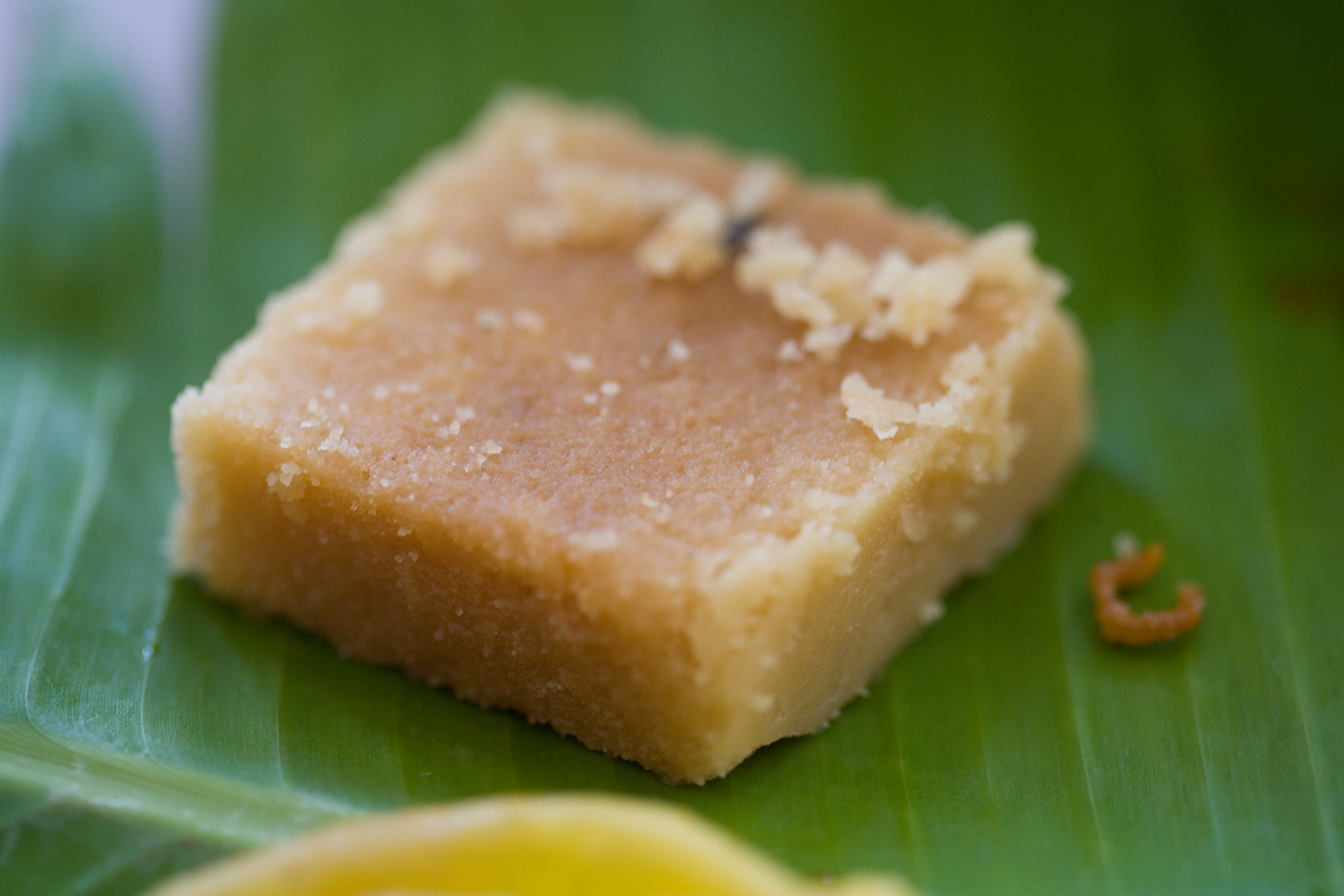
- Type: Dessert
- Place of origin: India
- Region or state: Mysore, Karnataka
- Main ingredients: Sugar, gram flour, ghee

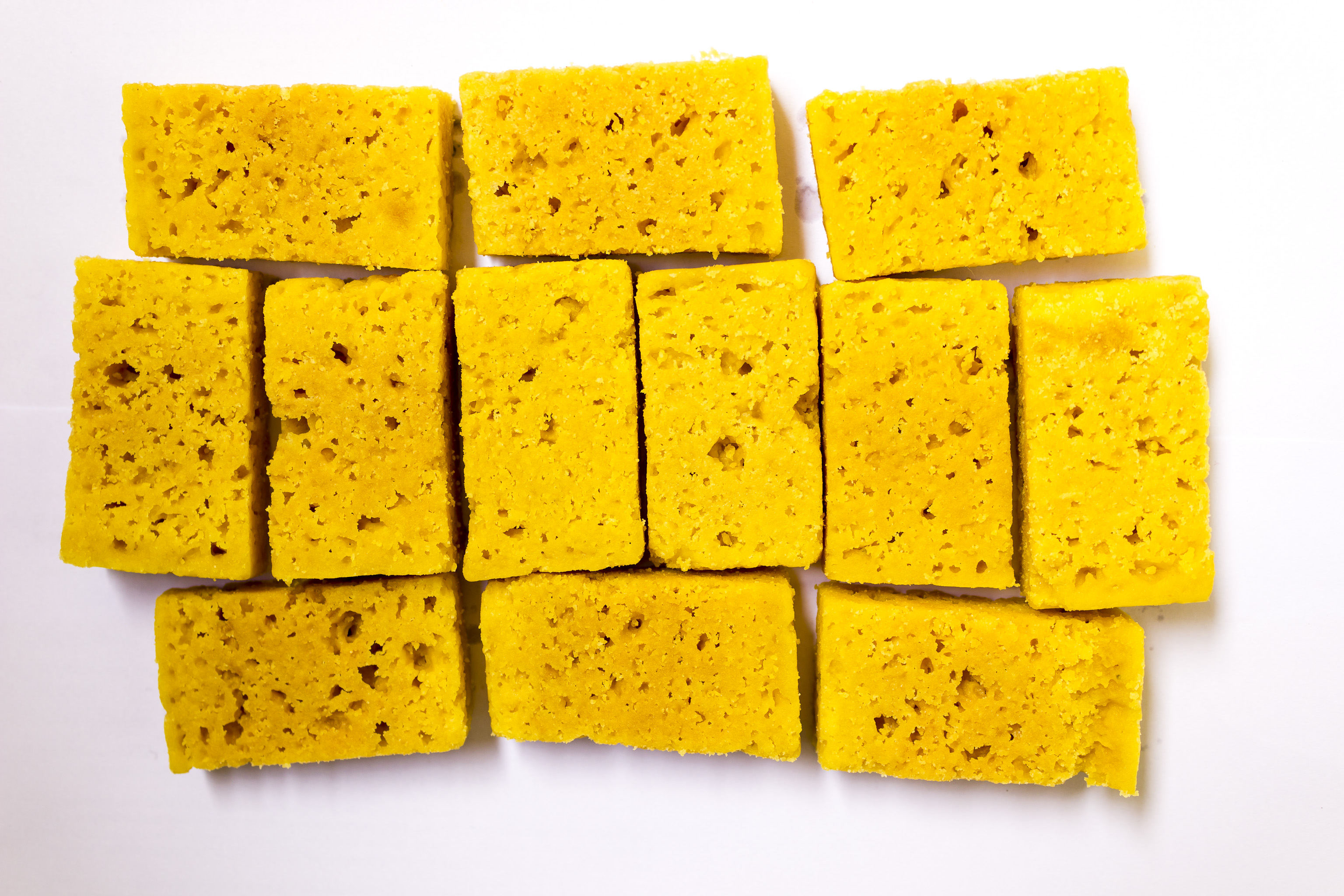
Regular Mysorepak pieces

Mysore pak (Kannada: ಮೈಸೂರು ಪಾಕ್, lit. 'Mysore's confection') is a traditional Indian confectionery made primarily from gram flour (besan), sugar, and ghee and often flavoured with cardamom. It originated in the royal kitchens of the Kingdom of Mysore, located in the present-day state of Karnataka, India. The texture of this sweet is similar to both a fudge and a buttery dense cookie. Known for its rich, melt-in-the-mouth texture, Mysore pak is a signature sweet of Karnataka and is widely consumed across southern India during weddings, festivals, and celebrations. The sweet is also popular in Bangladesh (locally referred to as Monsur) and Pakistan.

== History ==
Mysore pak was first prepared during the reign of Krishna Raja Wadiyar IV, the Maharaja of Mysore, in the early 20th century. The Maharaja was known for his passion culinary arts of fine cuisine, maintained an elaborate royal kitchen in Mysore Palace. mysore pak is widely referred as king of sweets in india According to tradition, a palace chef named Kakasura Madappa experimented with a simple mixture of gram flour, sugar, and ghee to create a new variant of mithai. This resulted a confectionary which had a distinctive golden color with a soft, fudgy but slightly crunchy texture, and a rich taste. When asked by the Maharaja for the name of the dish, Madappa reportedly called it Mysorepak, simply referring to the city Mysore with the suffix pak resembling the cooking process.

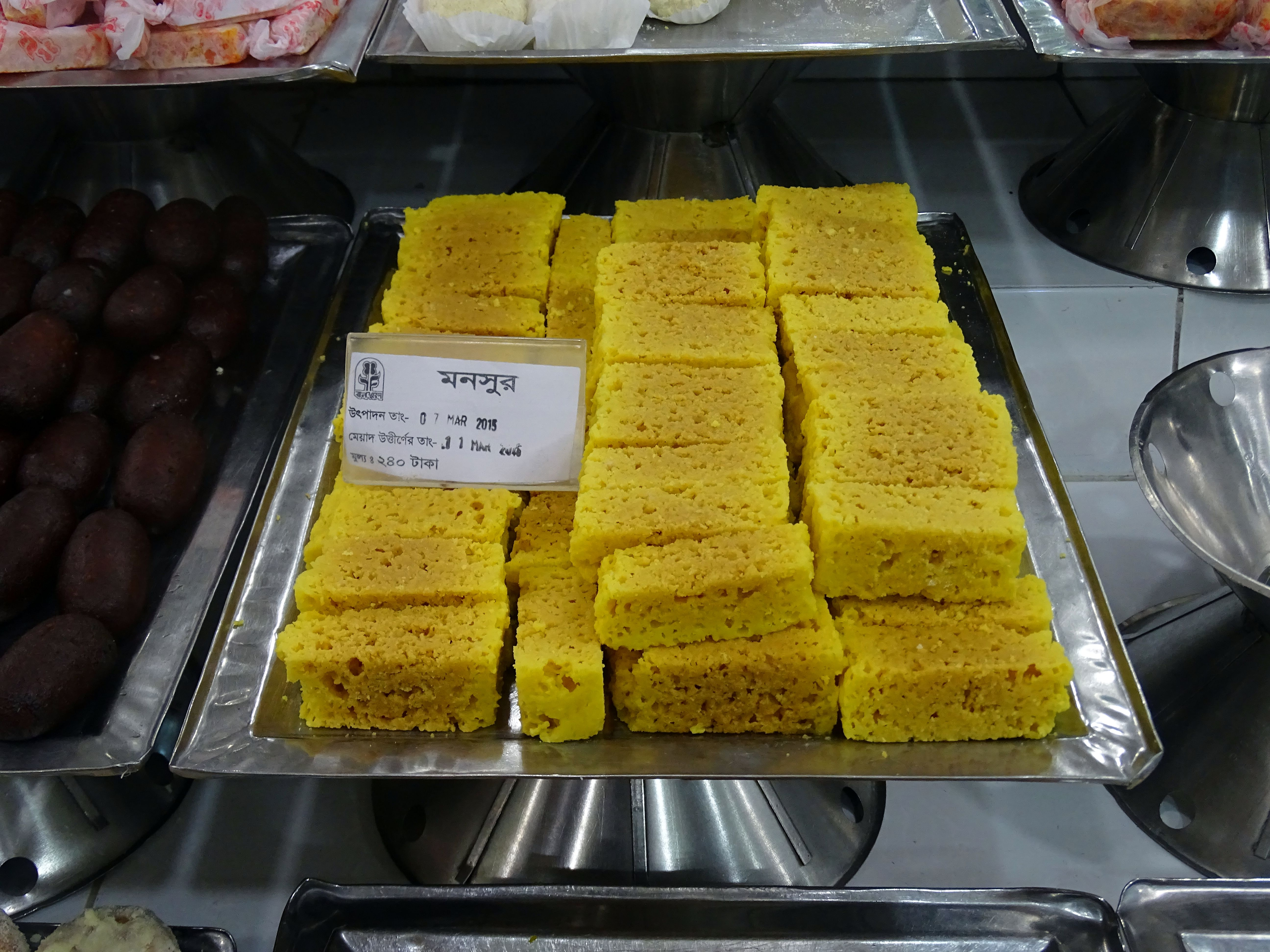
Mysorepak in a Bangladeshi sweetshop labelled as Monsur

Monsuri Mithai (Bengali: মনসুরী মিঠাই) in Bangladesh is made from gram flour, sugar and ghee or oil. Locals had traced its origins to an Afghan confectioner Monsur Pathan whom its name had derived, flourished by the patronage of Mughal emperors in imperial Delhi. So called Monsur and Mysorepak had no major distinction and is considered as the same delicacy.

== Preparation ==
The preparation involves cooking sugar syrup to a precise consistency—traditionally known as paaka—then gradually adding roasted gram flour (besan) and hot ghee. It is hard and porous when made with combination of ghee and oil. Moisture from the sugar syrup escapes as steam through the greased gram flour rendering Mysorepak porous. Excess ghee, if any, may fill in such pores rendering it dense. Constant stirring is required to ensure smoothness and prevent lumps. The mixture is cooked until it begins to leave the sides of the pan and is then poured into a greased tray, where it sets and is cut into cubes or rectangular blocks.

A key feature of Mysorepak is the mastery required to control the sugar-syrup stage, ranging from thread consistency to softball stage which influences the final fudgy and crunchy texture of the sweet. Some modern adaptations use refined oil along with or instead of ghee, and may include cardamom for flavor or baking soda for texture. It is The classic version, however, is known for using generous amounts of ghee to achieve a rich flavor and melt-in-the-mouth consistency.

== See also ==
- Cuisine of Karnataka
- Dharwad pedha
- Maddur vada
- Mangalore bajji
