= Folk arts of Karnataka =

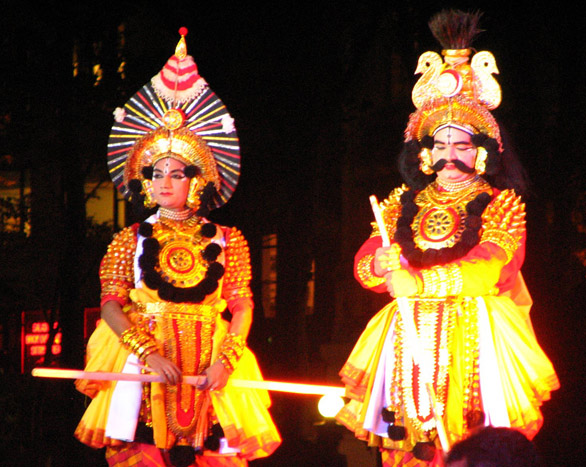
Yakshagana performers in action.

Karnataka has a variety of traditional arts, including folk dance and puppetry.

== Mysore region ==
=== Kunitha ===
The ritual dances of Karnataka are known as Kunitha. One such dance is the Dollu Kunitha, a popular dance form accompanied by singing and the beats of decorated drums. This dance is primarily performed by men from the Kuruba Gowda caste. The Dollu Kunitha is characterized by vigorous drum beats, quick movements and synchronized group formations.

=== Bharatnatyam / Bharata Natya ===
Bharatanatyam is classical dance of Karnataka. It is referred to as Bharata Natya in Kannada. This Indian classical dance form was mentioned in the Kannada text Manasollasa written by Someshwara III.

Kolata: A stick dance

=== Dollu Kunitha ===
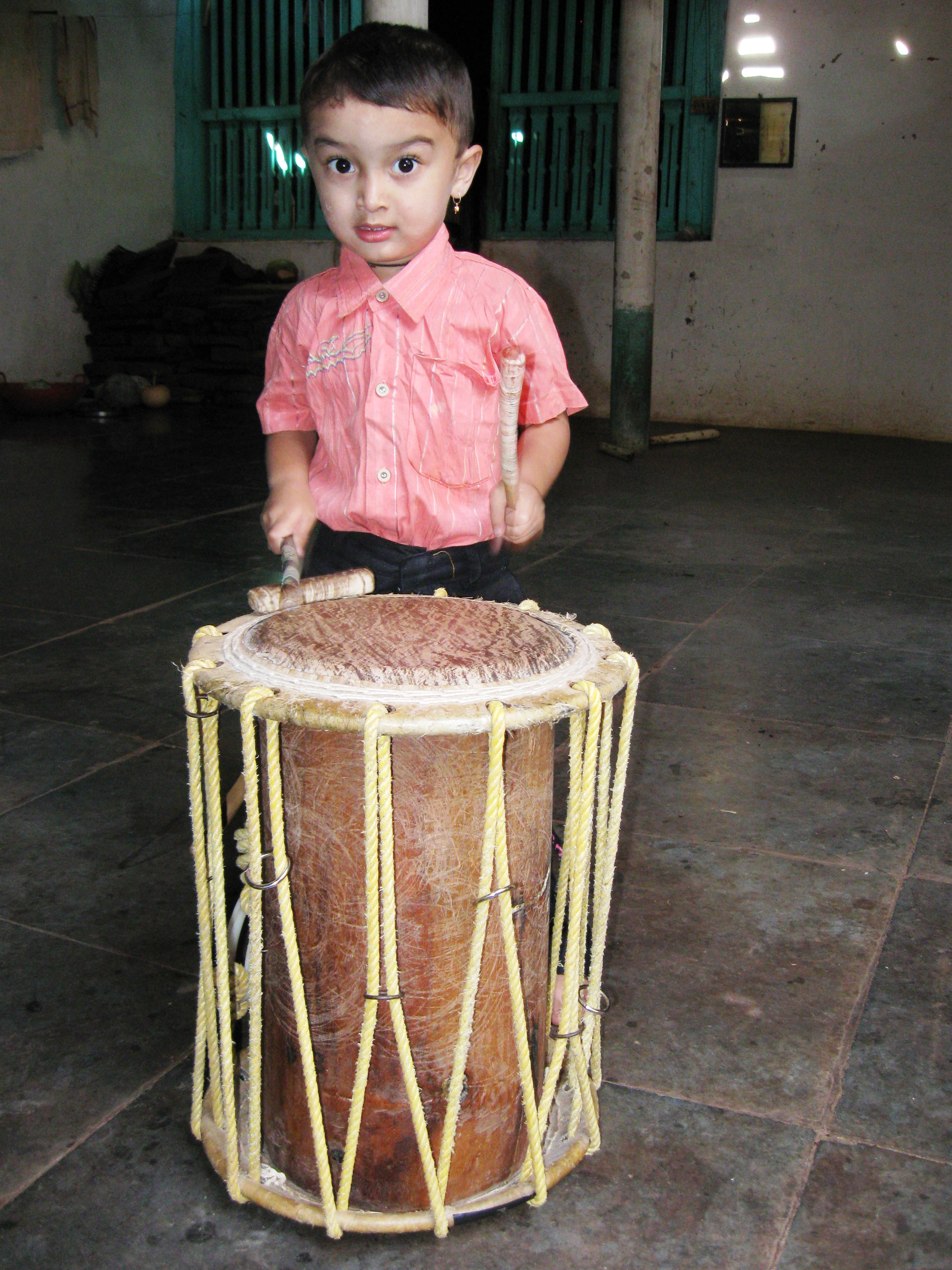
Various styles of traditional drums are used in folk music, dance and theater of Karnataka

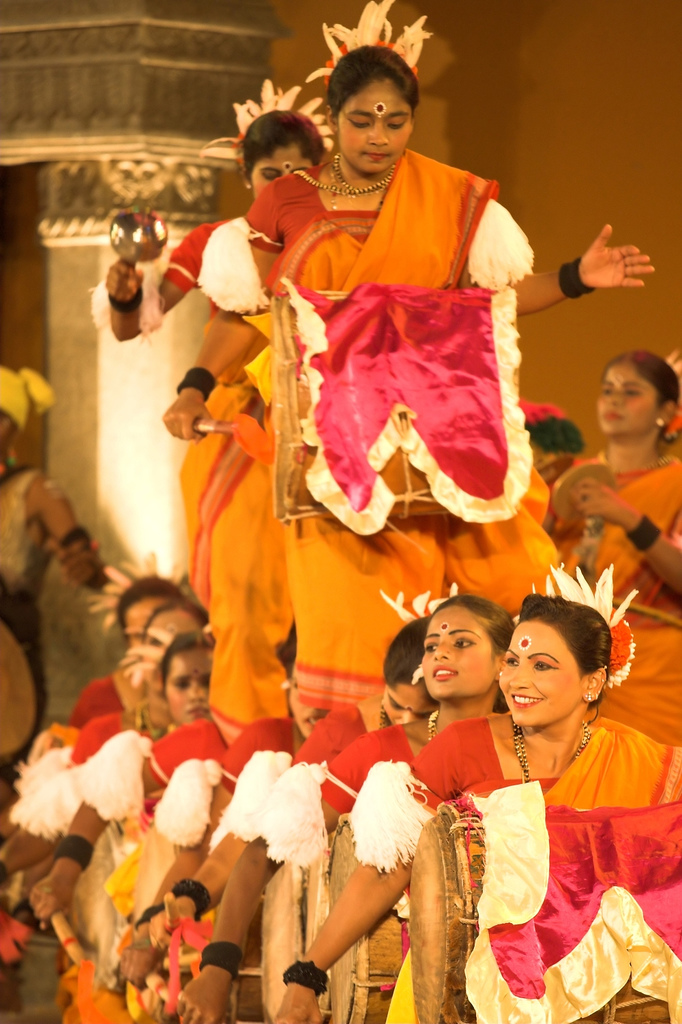
Dollu Kunitha is also danced by women.

This is a group dance named after the dollu used in its performance, and performed by the men of the Kuruba Gowda community. The group consists of 16 dancers, each wearing a drum and playing different rhythms while dancing. The beat is directed by a leader with cymbals in the center. Slow and fast rhythms alternate, and the group weaves a varied pattern. Costumes are simple; the upper part of the body is usually left bare, while a black sheet is tied on the lower body over the dhoti. A troupe led by K. S. Haridas Bhat toured the USSR in 1987, performing in Moscow, Leningrad, Vyborg, Arkhangelsk, Pskov, Murmansk, Tashkent and Novograd.

=== Beesu kamsale and kamsale nritya ===
This is a group dance performed by village men in the Mysore, Nanjanagudu, Kollegala and Bangalore regions. It is named after the kamsale, which is played and as a prop by the dancers. The kamsale is a cymbal in one hand and a bronze disc in the other, producing a rhythmic clang.

The kamsale nritya is connected to a tradition of worship of Male Mahadeshwara (Shiva) by the Kuruba Gowda community, from which most of the dancers are drawn. The dance is performed to rhythmic, melodious music sung in praise of Shiva. It is part of a diiksha(oath), and is taught by a spiritual leader. This dance was showcased in Kannada films such as Janumadha Jodi and Jogi, in which the protagonist is a kamsale dancer.

=== Somana Kunita ===
Somana Kunita (the Mask Dance) is a celebratory form of guardian spirit worship popular in southern Karnataka, performed primarily in village shrines dedicated to the Mother Goddess by the Gangemata community. The dance is characterised by elaborate masks (somas) painted in a variety of colours, with each mask's colour indicating the god's nature. A benevolent deity is represented by a red mask, while a yellow or black mask suggests the opposite. There are many types of masks, differing from region to region.

Somana Kunitha is a ritualistic dance associated with worship of the Grama Devate [village deity], and is primarily celebrated after Ugadi and before the onset of the monsoon at Maha Shivaratri. It is most popular in the old Mysore region, in districts such as Hassan, Tumkur, Bangalore, Mandya and Chitradurga.

On the ceremonial day, offerings are made to the spirits. The masks are made from the red sandalwood tree. Other props include a cane (or stick) and peacock feathers. A small hat with colourful flowers, neem leaves and colourful strips of cloth is also worn. Music is provided by the doonu(percussion), mouri(pipe) and sadde(a pipe for the Śruti). The dancer begins in the temple of the goddess, singing praise of the guardian spirit in a trance-like state. An offering of the blood of a fowl is sometimes made to the goddess.

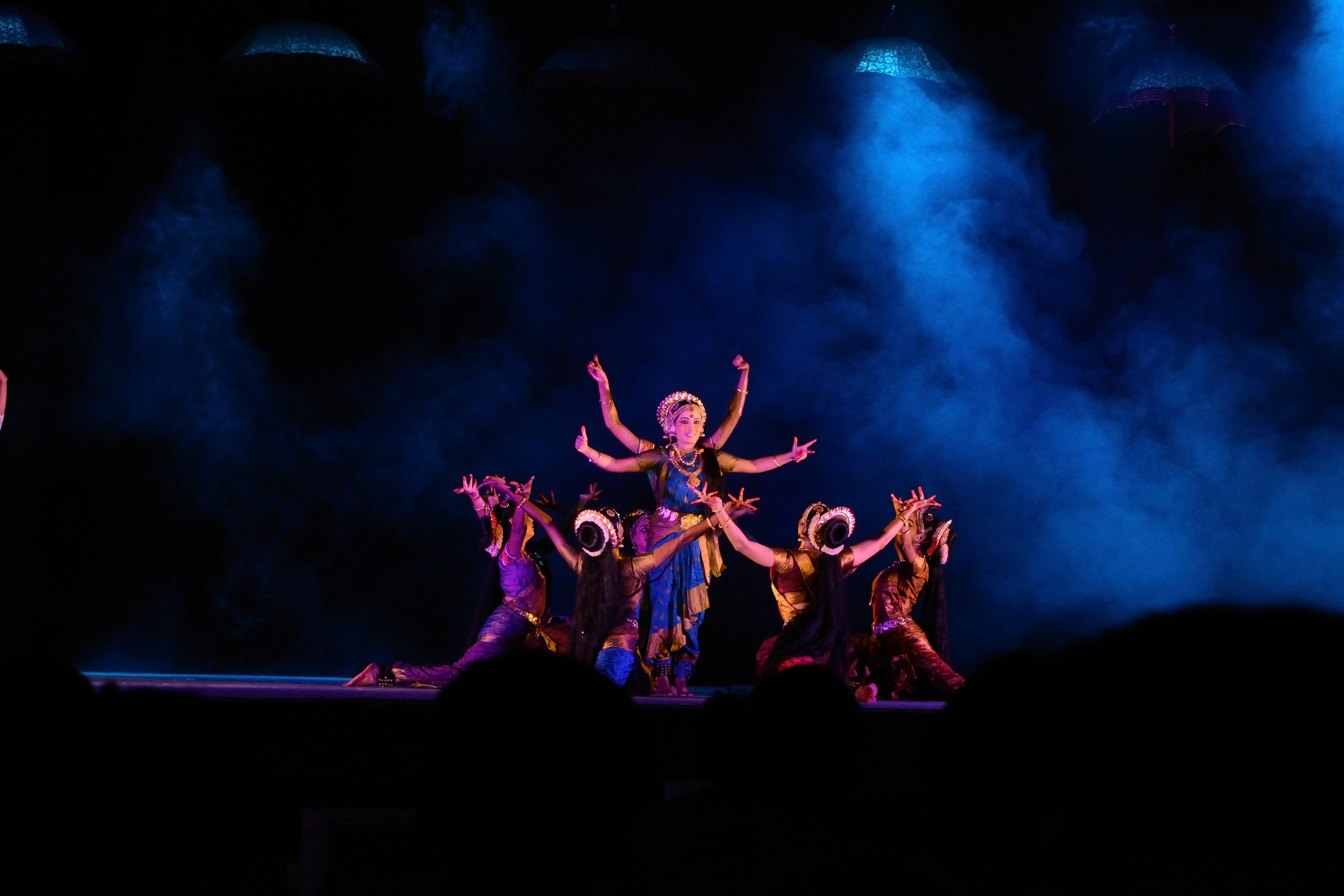
Bharata Natya classical dance

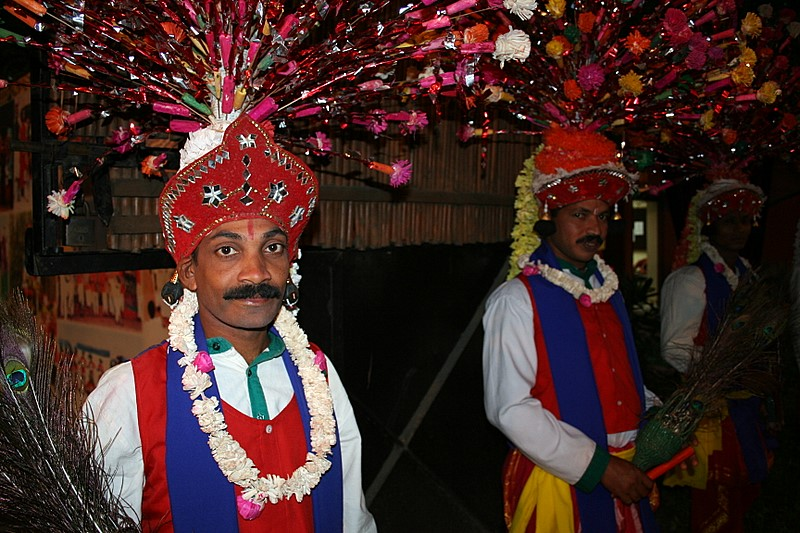
Suggi Kunitha

=== Suggi Kunitha ===
Suggi Kunitha (the Harvest Dance) is performed during the harvest time mostly by the farming community. Artists in beautiful costumes and wooden head gear adorned with carved birds and flower dance to the tune of drums with sticks and peacock feathers. They enhance the dance sometimes, by their own singing.

== North Karnataka ==
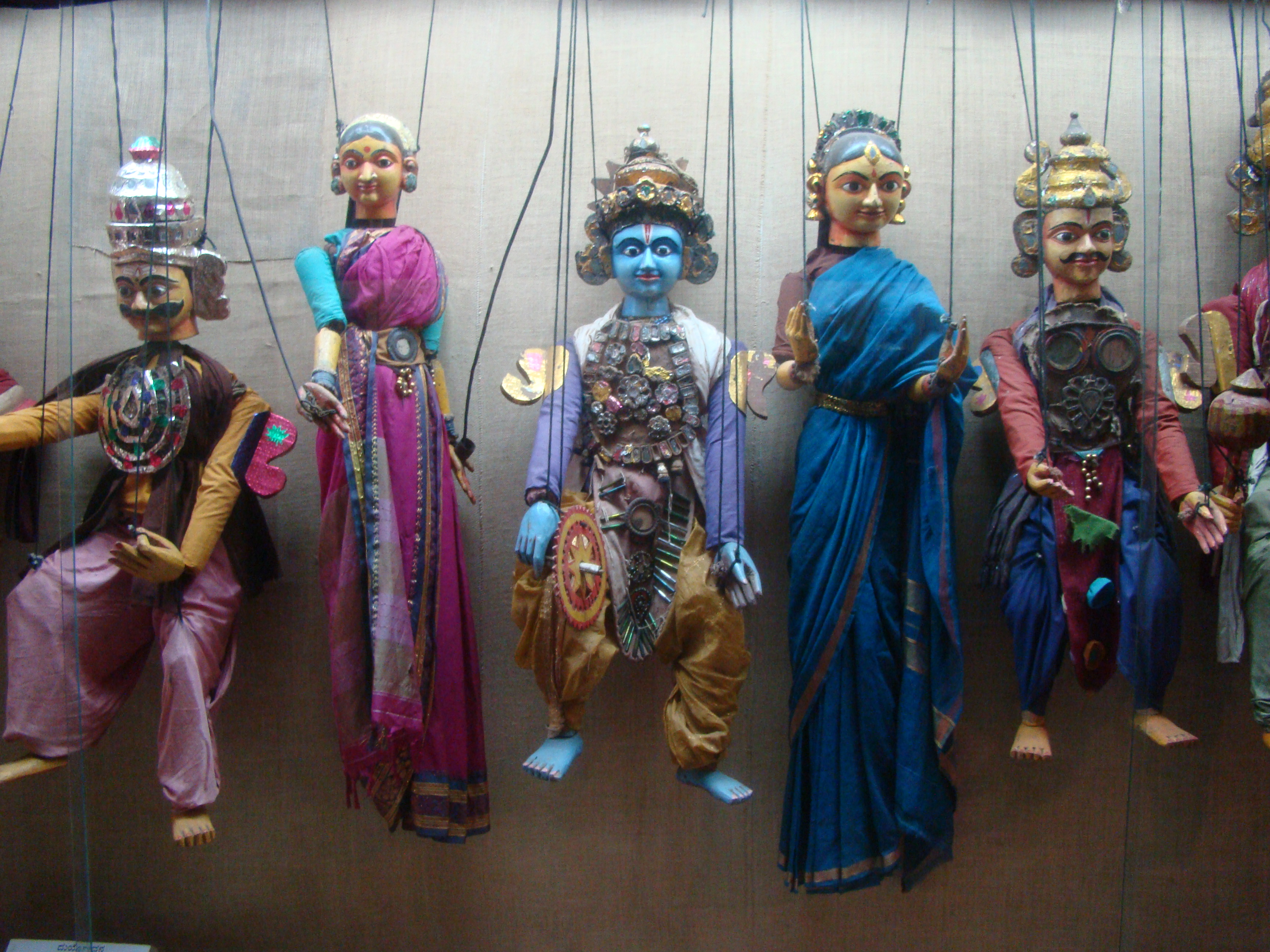
Traditional wooden Puppetry of Karnataka.

=== Jaggahalige Kunita ===
This is a folk art of the Hubballi Dharwad region (particularly the village of Byahatti), which is performed on occasions such as Ugadi and Holi. The jagghalige is a percussion instrument made from a bullock cart wheel wrapped in buffalo hide. The villagers roll out the large instruments and march in procession. The performance is directed by a choreographer playing a much-smaller percussion instrument called the kanihaligi, made of clay and covered with calf hide. The performance usually involves about 15 people.

=== Karadi majalu ===
This is popular group folk music in north Karnataka, performed during occasions and in processions. The karadi or karade is the percussion instrument used by the group. It is a palm-sized cymbal producing metallic sounds, and the shehnai produces the melody.

=== Krishna Parijatha ===
Krishna Parijatha is theatre popular in North Karnataka. It is a combination of Yakshagana and Bayalata, portraying stories or scenes from the Mahabharata

=== Lavani ===
This folk dance of Maharashtra is also present in some parts karnataka

== Dakshina Kannada ==
Jambavanta as depicted in Yakshagana.

=== Bhootha Aradhane ===
This dance form is widely performed in coastal regions. The Bhootha Aradhane (Gana) worship includes a procession of idols and is characterized by drums and firecrackers. At the end of the procession, the idols are placed on a plinth. A dancer, personifying a bhoota (holy spirit), dances around the plinth with sword and jingling bells. The dancer dances quickly and then slows, signifying that he is now divine.

=== Yakshagana ===
Yakshagana is not folk art but a popular traditional theatre of India performed in coastal and malenadu regions which is a blend of dance, music, songs, scholarly dialogue and colourful costumes. The word means "celestial music", and the dance drama is performed during the night (usually after the winter crop has been harvested).

== Kodagu ==
The Huttari Dance and 'Contemporary theatre culture in Karnataka is one of the most vibrant in India with organizations like Ninasam, Ranga Shankara and Rangayana active on foundations laid down by the Gubbi Veeranna Nataka Company Bolak-aata are dance forms in Kodagu. The Kodavas are a unique group who differ in customs, traditions and religion from the surrounding populace, and have an annual harvest dance. The men, dressed in traditional Kodava costumes with decorative knives, perform this slow dance to background music. The dance has different varieties:

=== Bolak-aat ===
Performed by Kodava men in back of an oil lamp in an open field. The men hold chavari(yak fur) in one hand and the Kodava short sword (odi-kathi) in the other while performing this dance. Regional varieties of this dance exist in which performers dance with the chavari and not the short sword. When the odi-kathi is also used, the dance is known as kattiyaata. The dudi, an hourglass-shaped drum, provides the rhythm.

Video demonstrating the features of Odi Kathi

=== Ummatt-aat ===
Performed by Kodava women, who wear traditional Kodava dress with jewelry, adorn their foreheads with kumkuma and dance in a circle to a swinging rhythm, brass cymbals in hand. A woman stands at the center holding a pot full of water to represent Kaveri Taayi (Mother Kaveri), whom the Kodavas worship.

=== Komb-aat ===
While the Bolaak-aat and the Ummatt-aat are celebratory and festive, the Komb-aat is a religious dance. It is traditionally performed in temples, but may also be performed in other places. Performed by Kodava men, deer horns represent the horns of the krishnamruga (a spotted deer in Kodava legend). The dance is performed to rhythmic tunes played on wind instruments and percussion, and includes martial movements representing techniques used by the Kodavas in warfare.

=== Putthari Kolata ===
Puthari Kolata is a form of stick dance performed by Koadavas during ' Puthari ' festival.

== Arts common to most regions ==
=== Hagalu veshagaararu ===
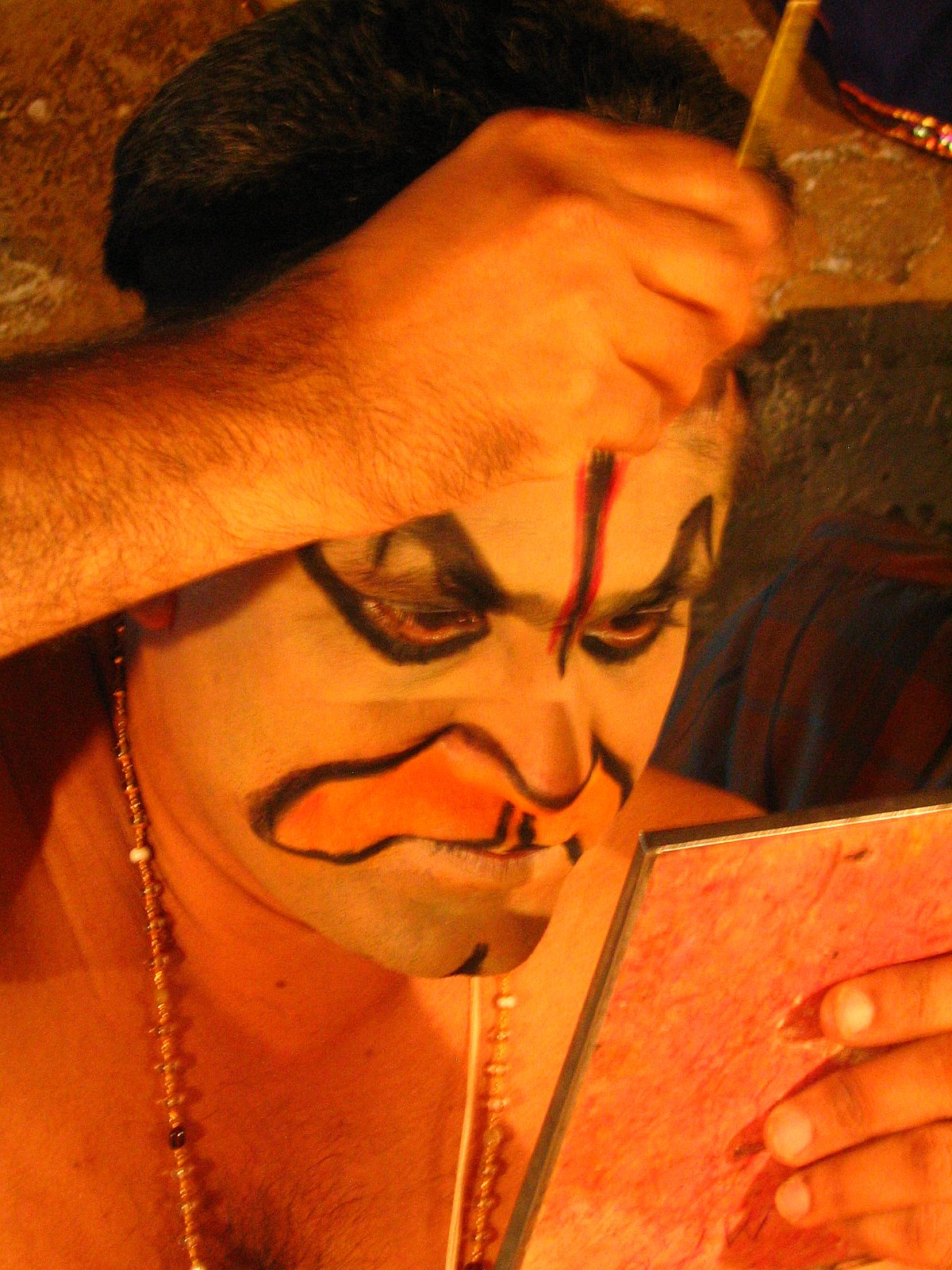
Folk artist applying character makeup.

This is a group of itinerant actors in Karnataka who specialise in unscripted miming; no stage or facility is used. The artists move from place to place, pitching tents and offering to perform. They play a variety of mythological, legendary and real characters. Performances draw from daily life, and sometimes full-length plays are staged. They perform vachana sahityas by Sarvagna, Basavanna and others.

The harmonium, the tabla-dagga and a pair of cymbals provide melody and rhythm. For their performances, staged in village squares and fairs, the actors receive food collected in a bag by an assistant accompanying the troupe. Most hagalu veshagaararus belong to the Veerashaiva tradition, while some are Muslims. Sometimes they are addressed as jyaatigaararu ("belonging to the Muslim community"). They are also known as suDugaaDu siddha ("monks of the cemetery") or bahuroopi ("having many disguises").

As their name suggests, they perform primarily during the day (hagalu) and only men take part (including female roles). While entertainment is the main objective, the hagalu veshagararu also educate villagers about mythology and social issues with their performances.

=== Goravara kunita ===
Goravara kunita is a dance worshipping Shiva which is popular in the Mysore and North Karnataka regions. In North Karnataka the Goravas worship Mylara Lingeshwara Temple which belongs to the Halumatha(Kuruba gowda) community. In South Karnataka the Goravas wear black-and-white woollen garments and a black-bear-fur cap (of black bear), and play the damaru and the pillangoovi (flute). In North Karnataka the Goravas wear black woollen garments and a leather shoulder bag; some wear a black coat and white dhoti. The dancers rub crimson powder and vibhooti (sacred ash) on their foreheads. Traditional Gorava devotees dance in a trance, sometimes barking like dogs. The dancers move in a clockwise zigzag, with no fixed choreography. The North Karnataka Goravas wear yellow powder on their foreheads and give Prasada to devotees. Damaru, venu, small bronze bells and cowbells (paarigante) are played. The dance consists of trance-like movements with no fixed choreography.

=== Nagamandala ===
This ritual dance is performed in south Karnataka to tranquilize the serpent spirit, and is an extravagant night-long affair. The dancers (Vaidyas) dance all night around a huge figure, drawn on the ground in natural colors, in a pandal in front of the shrine. The dance is generally performed between December and April.

=== Karaga ===
The karaga, in a dance performed by the Thigalas, is a metal pot on which stands a tall, floral pyramid and which is balanced on the carrier's head. The contents of the pot are secret. The carrier's arrival is heralded by hundreds of bare-chested, dhoti-clad, turbaned Veerakumaras with unsheathed swords.

=== Gaarudi Gombe ===
Gaarudi Gombe is a folk dance in which dancers dress in suits made of bamboo sticks. Gaarudi-Gombe means "magical puppet" in Kannada. The dance is performed during major festivals and in the procession held during the Mysore Dasara, and is known as Tattiraya in the coastal regions. Tattiraya means "someone carrying a doll made of bamboo sticks".

The dance features masks, puppets and colourful regional costumes. The puppets are made from bamboo and papier mâché, painted with suitable makeup. During the fair and festival procession to the temple, the giant dolls are the central attraction to spectators. The dolls are hollow and permit a person to get inside, carry the structure on his shoulders and dance, while being able to see. The dolls are used for fun and to ward off evil spirits, depicting characters from Indian mythology and folklore. The dance is performed to the tamate and dholu (a percussion instrument). Each doll weighs 10 to 12 kilograms (22 to 26 pounds), and stand 10 to 12 feet (3.0 to 3.7 metres) tall. During the procession, some performers wear character masks and interact with the dolls. Itinerant performers dressed as a tiger (hulivesha) or bear (karadi-vesha) with dancing monkeys are common in South India.

=== Joodu Haligi ===
The Joodu Haligi is performed with two percussion instruments. The Haligi is round, made of buffalo hide and played with a short stick. The dance is characterised by high energy and exaggerated expressions by two or three performers.

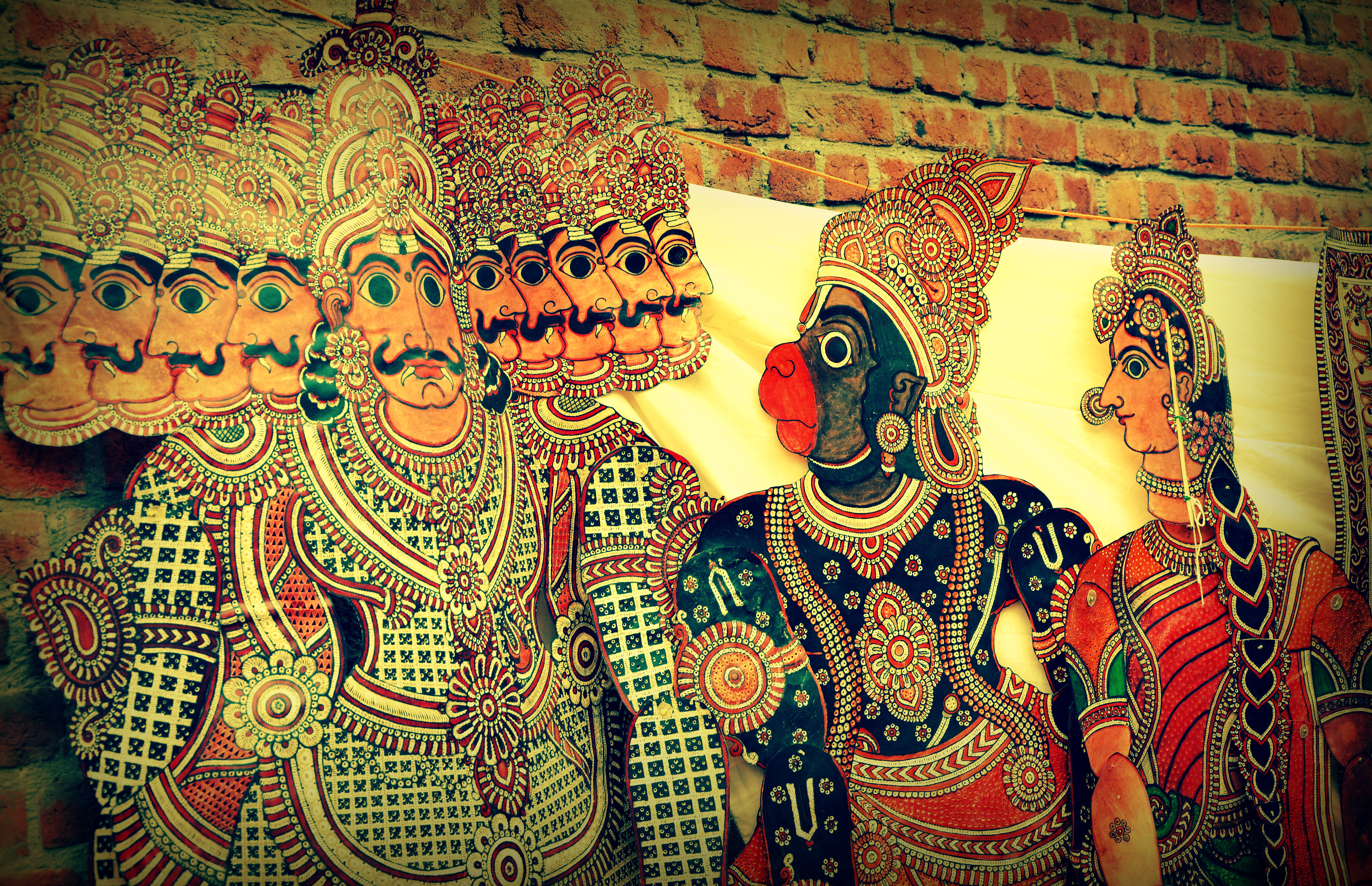
Togalu Gombeyaata, is a traditional form of shadow puppetry from Karnataka.

=== Puppetry ===
Togalu Gombeyaata is a type of shadow puppetry which is unique to Karnataka. The name meaning "a play with leather dolls" in Kannada. The Karnataka Chitrakala Parishat has researched this art form, and has an extensive collection of leather puppets.

=== Veeragaase/Guggla dance ===
Veeragase also called as Guggla, a vigorous dance based on Hindu mythology, is one of the dances performed at the Mysore Dasara. It is primarily performed during the Hindu months of Shravana and Karthika.

== See also ==
- Karnataka
- Janapada Loka

== Gallery ==
Kannada Sobana Song

Karnataka Lamani Folk Song

Doggaya, a folk dance of Karnataka
