= Kugur =

- village
- Location in Karnataka, India Kugur (India)
- Coordinates: 12.7°N 77.7°E
- Country: India
- State: Karnataka
- District: Bangalore
- Talukas: Anekal

Area
  - Total: 300.51 km^{2} (116.03 sq mi)
- Elevation: 915 m (3,002 ft)

Population (2001)
  - Total: 1,137
  - Density: 3.784/km^{2} (9.799/sq mi)

Languages
  - Official: Kannada
- Time zone: UTC+5:30 (IST)

Kugur is a cultural heritage village in the Anekal taluk of Bangalore district in the Indian state of Karnataka. It is located near Sarjapura.

== Geography ==
It is located 30 kilometers to the east of Bangalore. The village is located on the banks of river Dakshina Pinakini. The agricultural production is made by the nearby river water. It includes paddy fields, sugarcane, sericulture and other crops throughout the year. The village is very famous for sugarcane, silk and milk.

== Education ==
The Government High School was started in 1983, the second Government High School in Anekal Taluk. The school has grown to a 30-acre (120,000 m^{2}) campus, with its own computer lab, and lush green scenery surrounding the school. Infosys foundation donated 14 computers to the school in 2000. The school has a very good track record over the last ten years in SSLC examination, achieving second place in Bangalore District level. The students have also achieved gold, silver and bronze medals in state level competitions for Kabaddi, Khokkho, running, Javelin throwing, long jump, and high jump.

The villagers have a literacy level of 95%, the highest for their district. Stree Shakti was formed by middle income women of the village with the help of Dena Bank, Kugur Branch for women's empowerment. It has been successfully run on a cooperative basis for the past six years.

Kugur is well culture bound village; the folk culture is still alive. The youth have formed teams for Kolata, Dollu Kunita, Naadaswara and other arts. These teams have participated in the State Annual Youth Cultural festival and other programs.

== History ==
There are small and very old Lord Shiva Temples on the banks of the river. These are Sanimatmma temple and Muneeshwara.

Hoysala era statues (Veera Kallu, Masti Kallu) can be seen in the village and a century-old Grāmadevatā (Duggalamma) statue is also present. A century-old shiva linga also exists on the banks of river Dakshina Pinakini. The upcoming Dravidian style temples are Lord Vinayaka and Lord Shaneshwarakallyana Kodhada Rameshwara Swamy temple.

== Transportation ==
The village can be reached by BMTC bus from K.R. Market, bus numbers 323B, KUGUR and 327G from the Bangalore KEMPEGOWADA Bus Stand.
