= Dravidian folk religion =

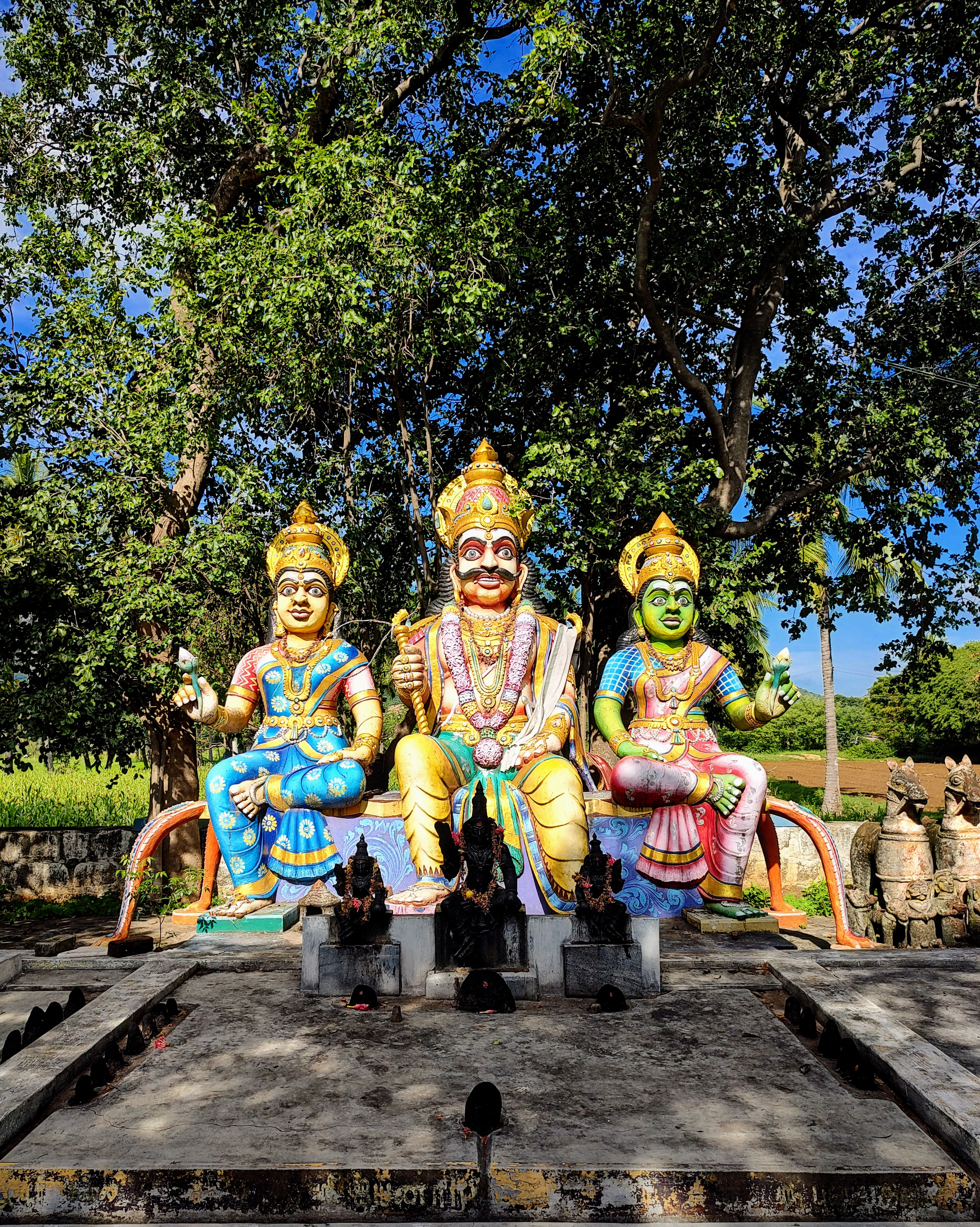
Dravidian folk deity Ayyanar with two wives

Dravidian folk religion refers to the indigenous traditions and cultural practices of the Dravidian peoples in south India and the Indian subcontinent. These traditions likely included ancestor worship, nature veneration, and village deities, some of which still persists. These practices were either historically or are at present Āgamic. The origin and chronology of Agamas is unclear. Some are Vedic and others non-Vedic.

The Agama traditions include Yoga and self-realization concepts, some include Kundalini Yoga, asceticism, and philosophies ranging from Dvaita (duality) to Advaita (non-duality). Some suggest that these are late post-Vedic texts, others as compositions dating back to over 1100 BCE. Epigraphical and archaeological evidence suggests that Agama texts were in existence only by about middle of the 1st millennium CE.

Scholars note that some passages in the Hindu Agama texts appear to repudiate the authority of the Vedas, while other passages assert that their precepts reveal the true spirit of the Vedas. The Agamas are a collection of Tamil and Sanskrit scriptures chiefly constituting the methods of temple construction and creation of murti, worship means of deities, philosophical doctrines, meditative practices, attainment of sixfold desires and four kinds of yoga.

== Classification ==
There is no uniform scholarly consensus regarding the nature or historical extent of an early religion. The term Dravidian primarily denotes a family of languages, including Tamil, Telugu, Kannada and Malayalam, rather than a single race, political community or historically uniform religious population.

The expression “Dravidian religion” has been used in several overlapping senses, referring to reconstructed beliefs among early Dravidian-speaking communities, historical religious practices in southern India that were not primarily derived from Vedic ritual literature, or local and village traditions maintained by Dravidian-speaking communities. These usages do not necessarily refer to a single organized or internally uniform religious tradition.

Some earlier scholars attempted to reconstruct a distinct pre-Vedic Dravidian religion on the basis of village-deity worship, ancestor veneration, hero memorials, spirit possession, animal offerings and the prominence of female deities. Such reconstructions remain disputed because the available evidence comes from different periods and regions.

The cult of the Female Principle was a major aspect of Dravidian culture with Shakti as an integral part.

This Dravidian linguistic influence represents an early religious and cultural fusion (Note: Lockard: "The encounters that resulted from Aryan migration brought together several very different peoples and cultures, reconfiguring Indian society. Over many centuries a fusion of Indo-Aryan peoples and Dravidian occurred, a complex process that historians have labeled the Indo-Aryan synthesis." Lockard: "Hinduism can be seen historically as a synthesis of Aryan beliefs with Harappan and other Dravidian traditions that developed over many centuries.") or synthesis between ancient Dravidians and Indo-Aryans, which became more evident over time with sacred iconography, traditions, philosophy, flora and fauna that went on to influence Hinduism, Buddhism, Jainism, Sramana and Charvaka.

Hindu itself already the product of "a composite of the Indo-Aryan and Harappan cultures and civilizations", (Note: See: David Gordo White: "[T]he religion of the Vedas was already a composite of the Indo-Aryan and Harappan cultures and civilizations."; Richard Gombrich: "It is important to bear in mind that the Indo-Aryans did not enter an unhabited [sic] land. For nearly two millennia they and their culture gradually penetrated India, moving east and south from their original seat in the Punjab. They mixed with people who spoke Munda or Dravidian languages, who have left no traces of their culture beyond some archaeological remains; we know as little about them as we would about the Indo-Aryans if they had left no texts. In fact we cannot even be sure whether some of the aerchaeological finds belong to Indo-Aryans, autochthonous populations, or a mixture. It is to be assumed - though this is not fashionable in Indian historiography - that the clash of cultures between Indo-Aryans and autochtones was responsible for many of the changes in Indo-Aryan society. We can also assume that many - perhaps most - of the indigenous population came to be assimilated into Indo-Aryan culture.) but also the Sramana or renouncer traditions of east India, and mesolithic and neolithic cultures of India, such as the religions of the Indus Valley civilisation, Dravidian traditions, and the local traditions and tribal religions. (Note: Tiwari mentions the Austric and Mongoloid people. See also Adivasi people for the variety of Indian people.) Hence, Dravidian culture played a major role in shaping Hinduism.

== Historiography and terminology ==
The modern category of a distinct “Dravidian religion” developed partly alongside the nineteenth-century recognition of the Dravidian language family. Francis Whyte Ellis and Robert Caldwell argued that the principal languages of southern India formed a linguistic family distinct from the Indo-Aryan languages and were not merely derivatives of Sanskrit. The linguistic classification does not by itself demonstrate that all Dravidian-speaking communities constituted a single race, civilization or religious community.

== Agamic and temple traditions ==
The Hindu Agamas comprise several bodies of Shaiva, Vaishnava and Shakta scripture concerned with theology, initiation, ritual, yoga, temple worship and iconography. They survive in Sanskrit as well as in regional textual and ritual environments, including those of southern India.

The chronology and regional formation of the Agamic traditions are complex. Some Agamic texts and institutions present their teachings as compatible with, or as an interpretation of, Vedic revelation, while other traditions establish distinct systems of authority and initiation. It is therefore difficult to classify the Agamas collectively as either wholly “Vedic” or wholly “non-Vedic”.

South Indian temple traditions were shaped through interactions among Agamic prescriptions, royal patronage, hereditary ritual institutions, devotional literature and local religious practice.

== Relationship with Hindu traditions ==
Hinduism comprises a diverse and cumulative family of religious traditions that developed in the Indian subcontinent. Its historical formation included Vedic sacrificial traditions, philosophical and renunciant movements, Puranic traditions, temple and Agamic traditions, devotional movements, regional literary cultures and local forms of deity worship.

In southern India, Sanskritic, Tamil, Kannada, Telugu and Malayalam religious traditions developed through continuing interaction. Shaiva, Vaishnava and Shakta traditions were expressed through both Sanskrit and regional-language texts, while temples, pilgrimage centres, devotional poetry and local ritual institutions connected regional religious life with wider Hindu traditions.

The boundaries between “local”, “folk”, “Agamic”, “Puranic”, “Vedic” and “Brahmanical” traditions have not always been fixed. Local deities could be identified with Shiva, Vishnu, Devi or their attendants, while deities and ritual forms known from Sanskrit sources acquired distinct regional names, narratives and practices.

Studies of Murugan, Tamil Shaivism, Tamil Vaishnavism and South Indian temple traditions demonstrate both regional distinctiveness and integration into wider Hindu textual, theological and ritual networks.

== Religion in ancient Tamilakam ==
The Tolkāppiyam, Eṭṭuttokai and Pattuppāṭṭu are important literary sources for the religious and cultural history of ancient Tamilakam. The Sangam corpus is primarily poetic rather than doctrinal and reflects a varied religious environment that included regional forms of worship, Vedic rituals, memorial practices and deities shared with wider Hindu traditions.

=== Deities and religious traditions ===
The Tolkāppiyam organizes classical Tamil love poetry through ecological and poetic settings known as tiṇais. Murugan, identified with Skanda and Kartikeya, was associated with the mountainous kuṟiñci landscape. Vishnu, also known as Tirumāl in Tamil tradition, was associated with the pastoral mullai landscape. Indra was associated with the agricultural marutam landscape, Varuna with the coastal neytal landscape, and Korravai with warfare, victory and the arid pālai landscape.

These associations formed part of a literary system as well as a religious vocabulary and did not constitute rigid or mutually exclusive pantheons. The presence of Murugan, Vishnu, Indra, Varuna and Korravai within the same literary environment reflects interaction between regional Tamil traditions and religious traditions shared across India.

Murugan occupies a prominent place in Tamil literature and Hindu worship and is identified with Skanda, Kartikeya, Kumara and Subrahmanya, the son of Shiva and Parvati. Vishnu likewise appears in early Tamil literature, while Tamil Vaishnavism later received influential devotional expression in the compositions of the Alvars.

References to Shiva and Shaiva imagery also occur in early Tamil literature. During the early medieval period, the hymns of the Nayanars, temple institutions and Agamic traditions contributed to the development of Tamil Shaivism.

Sangam literature also refers to Vedic learning, sacrificial fires and sacrifices sponsored by Tamil rulers. This attests the presence and royal patronage of Vedic ritual traditions in ancient Tamilakam.

Jainism and Buddhism were also present in the Tamil region and contributed to its literary and intellectual history. Explicitly Buddhist works such as the Manimekalai are generally associated with the post-Sangam literary period rather than with the earliest Sangam anthologies.

=== Goddess, guardian and memorial traditions ===
Female deities, particularly Korravai, appear in early Tamil literature. The worship of Parvati, Durga, Mariamman and regional forms of Amman developed through interaction among local, temple, devotional and textual traditions. These forms should not be presented either as an entirely separate religion or as proof of a single prehistoric mother-goddess tradition.

The erection and commemoration of hero stones, known in Tamil as naṭukal, are attested in literature, inscriptions and archaeology. These memorials commemorated people who died in battle or while defending their communities, and some became objects of ritual commemoration. Hero stones occur in several parts of India and are not exclusive to one language or religious community.

Ayyanar and other village guardian deities remain important in rural Tamil Hindu traditions. Some are associated locally with heroes, ancestors or protective spirits, but their origins and identities vary by region and should not all be reduced to hero-stone worship.

=== Possession and ritual-performance traditions ===
Early Tamil literature describes forms of ecstatic or possession-related ritual, sometimes called veriyattam, associated particularly with Murugan. Such performances involved music, dance and ritual specialists and could be performed by both men and women.

Theyyam is a Hindu ritual-performance tradition centred principally in the North Malabar region of Kerala and adjoining areas. It combines dance, music, oral narratives, elaborate costume and ritual possession. The performer is understood during the ceremony to embody or manifest a deity, ancestor or guardian and may offer blessings or oracular responses to worshippers.

The deities represented in Theyyam include regional forms associated with Bhagavati, Chamunda, Vishnu and Shiva, as well as local guardians, ancestors and heroes. Theyyam is therefore commonly understood as a regional Hindu tradition in which Puranic deities, local sacred histories, lineage worship and embodied ritual coexist.

Related ritual-performance traditions include Buta Kola or Daiva Kola among the Tulu-speaking communities of coastal Karnataka and northern Kerala. In these ceremonies, local daivas are invoked through oral narratives, music, costume and ritual possession, and the performer may mediate disputes or convey blessings and judgements.

Although Theyyam and Buta Kola preserve distinctive regional deities and ritual forms, they also interact with wider Hindu traditions. Regional deities may be understood through relationships with Shiva, Vishnu, Parvati, Bhagavati or their attendants while retaining local names, narratives and functions.

Other performance traditions include Koothu, a Tamil theatrical and storytelling tradition, and forms of Yakshagana in Karnataka. These traditions combine regional languages, music, dance and dramatic narration; many of their repertoires draw on the Ramayana, Mahabharata, the Puranas and regional sacred traditions.

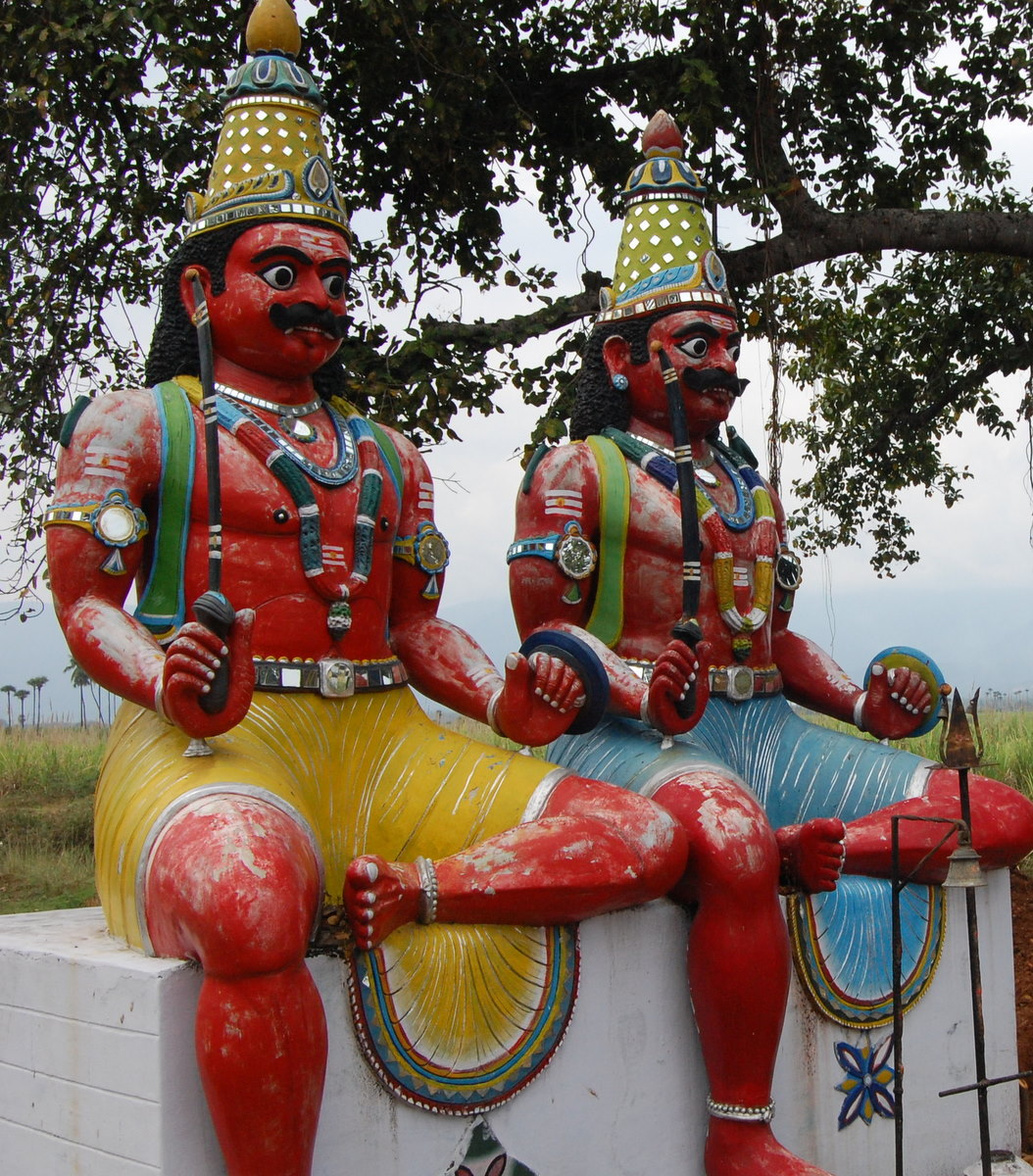
Ayyanar, guardian folk deity of Tamil Nadu villages

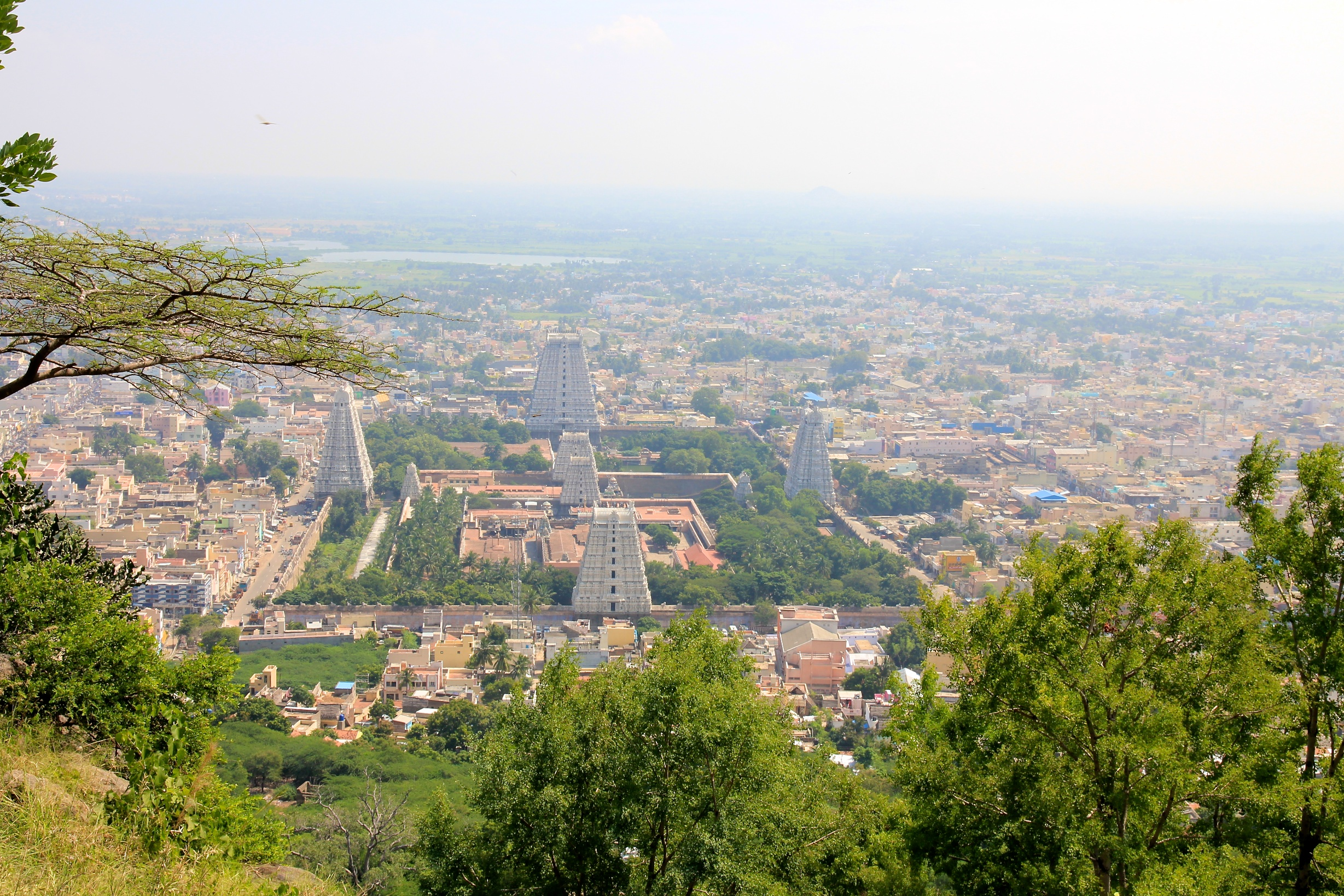
Typical layout of Dravidian architecture which evolved from koyil as a king's residence.

== Folk dance rituals ==
- There are multiple folk dance rituals in Karnataka used for the worship of gramadevata. One of these from Tulu areas is Yakshagana, literally meaning the song (gana) of the yaksha, (nature spirits). Yakshagana is the scholastic name (used for the last 200 years) for art forms formerly known as kēḷike, āṭa, bayalāṭa, and daśāvatāra (Kannada: ದಶಾವತಾರ). From the Old Mysore region comes Somana Kunitha.
- Koothu (Tamil: கூத்து), and alternatively spelt as kuttu, means dance or performance in Tamil, it is a folk art originated from the early Tamil country.

== Discourse ==
During the era of the British Raj, several Christian authors in the field of ethnology often drew a comparison between the Dravidian folk religion and the various Vedic traditions. A later record of the colonial administration, titled Manual of the Administration of the Madras Presidency, described the south Indian faith along the binary lines of deities and demons, essentially categorising the worship of the Dravidian population to "demons", or to "deities who rule[d] such demons to induce their interposition". The text considered the village goddess who guarded the village from disease and calamity in the category of superior demons, who, it stated, had attained the status of deities. Little distinction existed, according to the text, between the deities and the demons. The goddesses were placed within the paradigm of demonolatry, and the scholar identified blood sacrifice as a significant trait of the Dravidian religion. The reverend Samuel Mateer set apart the idolatry of Brahman-centered Hinduism from the worship of "evil and malignant spirits" that was performed by the indigenous natives of Southern India. The scholar Whitehead concluded that the "village deity" was little more than a petty spirit that tyrannised and protected a local hamlet, inspiring fear due to an ability to inflict diseases and injury to the villagers, not evoking any admiration or morality.

== Derivatives ==
Due to the Girmityas, Tamil and Telugu immigration to British, French, and Dutch colonies brought the religious practices that were derived from Dravidian Folk Religion but were syncretized with Vedic Hinduism.

In the Caribbean, a unique tradition called Caribbean Shaktism developed as a syncretic religion of this Tamil Mariamman worship and with aspects of Catholicism or other influences of the Caribbean religion.

== See also ==
- Buta Kola
- Dravidian languages
- Folk religion
- Gramadevata
- Karuppannaswamy
- History of Hinduism
- Indian religions
- Religion in ancient Tamil country
- Shinto
- Substratum in Vedic Sanskrit
- Theyyam
