= H. L. Nagegowda =

Indian Kannada writer, scholar, folklorist

- Born: 11 February 1915
- Died: 22 September 2005 (aged 90); Bangalore, Karnataka, India
- Occupations: Indian civil servant, folklorist, writer

H.L. Nagegowda (11 February 1915 – 22 September 2005) was a prominent Kannada folklorist and author. He received a number of awards in his lifetime, both for his writing and for his work in conserving and propagating folk traditions.

== Early life ==
Nage Gowda was born in Heraganahalli village in Mandya district in the southern Indian state of Karnataka. He studied science and law, before becoming a civil servant. He was made an officer of the Indian Administrative Service in 1960. Starting from the 1970s, Nage Gowda wrote a number of literary works in Kannada. Doddamane ("The big house") won critical acclaim for its portrayal of the culture of rural southern Karnataka, and was one of the works that won him the Karnataka Sahitya Akademi Award. He also wrote several other novels, two collections of poetry, collections of short stories and essays, and a travelogue.

== Career ==
In 1979, Nage Gowda founded the Karnataka Janapada Parishat, an academy devoted to the study and propagation of traditional folk arts in Karnataka. In 1986, he started work Janapada Loka, a museum of the folk arts located in Ramnagaram, around 53 kilometres from Bangalore, which opened to the public in 1994. He also wrote a number of books documenting folk traditions and artforms, and organised festivals, seminars and workshops to promote them.

Nage Gowda's work received significant recognition in his lifetime. He won a number of awards, including the Rajyotsava Award, the Pampa Prashasti, the Nadoja Prashasti and the Sandesha Award. He served in the Karnataka State Government as a member of the Legislative Council from 1995 until 2001. In 2002, Serpentine Road in Bangalore was renamed Dr H L Nage Gowda Road in his honour.

== Death ==
Gowda died on 22 September 2005 at his residence in Bangalore. As a mark of respect, the annual Rajajinagar cultural festival, the Rajajinagar Habba was dedicated to his memory and was organised around a theme of folk arts.

== See also ==
- Janapada Loka
- Folk arts of Karnataka
