= List of museums in Karnataka =

List of museums in Karnataka, India.

S.No	Museum Name	City	Type	Established	Jurisdiction	Collections
1.	Zoology Museum, Karnatak Science College	Dharwad	Zoology	1947	Karnatak University	Established in 1947 by Prof. P.W.Gideon. This museum houses some of the rare specimens of Pisces, Amphibians, Reptiles, Aves and Mammals. They are nearly 2500 animals are present in this museum.
2	Government Museum	Bangalore	Archaeological	1865	Directorate of Archaeology & Museums, Karnataka	Museum has a rare collection of archaeological and geological artifacts including old jewellery, sculpture, coins and inscriptions. The museum is also home to the Halmidi inscription, the earliest Kannada inscription ever found (450 AD).
3	Aloyseum	Mangalore	Archaeological	1913	St. Aloysius College (Mangalore)	Museum has a rare collection of archaeological and geological artifacts including Roman coins, swords from Abyssinia, Berlin Wall remnants, Italian drawings, whale skeleton, etc.
4	Kempegowda Museum	Bangalore	Heritage center	2011	Government of Karnataka	Museum is dedicated to Yelahanka chieftain Kempegowda (1513–1569) who is the founder of Bangalore city. The museum has Kempegowda's statue as well as posters and pictures of forts, temples, reservoirs and inscriptions from his time.
5	Visvesvaraya Industrial and Technological Museum	Bangalore	Science Museum	1965	National Council of Science Museums	Museum was instituted as part of the centenary celebrations of the engineer-statesman Sir M. Visvesvaraya (1861–1962). Artifacts related to Engines, transportation, telecommunication, aviation, rockets, computational device.
6	HAL heritage and Aerospace Museum	Bangalore	Aerospace	2001	HAL	Museum showcases the growth of the Indian aviation industry and HAL for six decades. The Museum is maintained by HAL (one of Asia's largest Aerospace companies). Showcases of Indian aviation industry & HAL. Aircraft, helicopters, engine models, Flight simulators, a mock Air Traffic Control Tower.
7	Karnataka Chitrakala Parishath	Bangalore	Folk life, art		Janapada trust	Museum is located in a 15-acre campus at Kumara Park West. It has an excellent collection of Folk puppets, costumes, utensils, instruments, weapons and masks. Folk music collections and folk dance videotapes.
8	Gandhi Bhavan	Bangalore	Gandhi's life	1965	Gandhi Smarak Nidhi	The Museum at Kumarapark is showcase of Mahatma Gandhi's life. It houses a photo gallery, his letters, a library and audio visuals.
9	Madras Sappers Museum & Archives	Bangalore	Military museum	1979	Madras Sappers	Museum showcases the history of the Madras Engineer Group (called the Sappers, established in 1803). The Madras Sappers are the oldest regiment of the Corps of Engineers of the Indian Army. The museum chronicles their history and achievements and houses armoury used by the regiment, medals, their attire and a sports gallery. This museum can be accessed with special permission from the Army.
10	NIMHANS Brain Museum	Bangalore	Anatomical Museum		Department of Neuropathology, NIMHANS	Museum showcases the human brain and its functions. It is located at National Institute of Mental Health and Neurosciences (NIMHANS). The Museum seeks to help visitors see the brain, understand how it works and get an insight into the kind of diseases that can affect it. The museum has a diverse collection of over 600 brain samples and is the result of over 30 years of research.
11	Law Museum	Bangalore	Law	2006	Karnataka High Court	Museum is dedicated to the legal profession. It was the brainchild of Karnataka High Court Chief justice Cyriac Joseph. The museum houses an original print of the Constitution of India, articles and documents related to the legal profession, seals, insignia and books. It also showcases the history of the High Court and the development of courts over the ages.
12	Philatelic Museum	Bangalore	Philatelic Museum	-	General Post Office	Museum is located at the first floor of the Bangalore General Post Office near Vidhana Soudha. It showcases numerous stamps from various time periods.
13	Legends Motorcycle Museum	Bangalore	Vintage motorcycles	defunct	Private collector	The Museum is a collection of 20 plus vintage motorcycles in working condition whose vintage dates back to 1924. The Museum is the lifelong collection of motorcycle enthusiast SK Prabhu. The museum walls are covered with biker memorabilia and photographs. The collection includes a 1924 BSA 250 cc, a Cezeta 1962 and some rare motorcycles from World War II: the BSA M20 1942 500 cc, James ML 1942 and the Norton 500cc 1942.
14	Regional Museum of Natural History	Mysore	Natural history museums	1995	Ministry of Environment and Forests	
15	Folklore Museum	Mysore	Folklore exhibits	1968	University of Mysore	6500 exhibits covering folklore, large dolls, literature & art.
16	Jayachamarajendra Museum	Mysore	Art Gallery and Palace	1915		2000+ paintings of Mysore, Mughal, Shantiniketan styles. Ravivarma and Roerich's work.
17	Mysore Rail Museum	Mysore	Rail heritage.	1979	Indian Railways	Photos & objects related to the development of rail. Royal coaches of Mysore Maharaja from 1899.
18	Government Museum, Rangaiahna Bagilu, Chitradurga	Chitradurga	Archaeological	-	Directorate of Archaeology & Museums, Karnataka	Collection of archaeological and geological artifacts.
19	Government Museum (Shivappa Nayaka Palace), Shivamogga	Shimoga	Archaeological	-	Directorate of Archaeology & Museums, Karnataka	Collection of archaeological and geological artifacts. Palacial residence of Shivappa Nayaka, 17th-century chieftain of the coastal areas and successors of the Vijayanagara Empire. The palace has two levels and is built of wood. The museum is housed in the courtyard and has numerous exquisitely carved sculptures, many of them from Balligavi, Kalkere and Somapura. Some of the notable pieces of work are Ugra Narasimha and Mahishasura Mardhini.
20	Government Museum, Hassan	Hassan	Archaeological	1976	Directorate of Archaeology & Museums, Karnataka	Museum is home to 400-year-old chariot from Sowmyakeshava temple of Ambuga village. 70 sculptures from nearby Belur and Halebidu temple towns. A variety of palm leaf manuscripts of Indian ancient epics like Ramayana (Sundara Kanda, Ayodhya Kanda, Yudha Kanda), Sri Krishna Charitra and the Shukasaptadikatha. 300 sculptures of Vishnu, Shiva, Veerabadra and other deities. An enormous collection of rare historical objects and weapons of the Vijayanagara kings, Hoysalas and the Palegars. A rare collection of 110 copper coins from the era of Tipu Sultan, Mysore Maharajas, Portuguese, the East India Company and Queen Victoria are displayed here.
21	Government Museum, Madikeri	Madikeri	Archaeological	1970	Directorate of Archaeology & Museums, Karnataka	Collection of archaeological and geological artifacts. Museum contains costumes of the Coorg rulers and the British, bronze statues, inscriptions, coins, armaments, sculptures and wooden carvings from the 11th century.
22	Srimanthi Bai Memorial Government Museum, Bijai	Mangalore	Archaeological	-	Directorate of Archaeology & Museums, Karnataka	Collection of archaeological and geological artifacts.
23	Government Museum, Gadag	Gadag	Archaeological	-	Directorate of Archaeology & Museums, Karnataka	Collection of archaeological and geological artifacts.
24	K.R.C.M. Government Museum, Kittur	Belgaum District	Archaeological	-	Directorate of Archaeology & Museums, Karnataka	Collection of archaeological and geological artifacts.
25	Government Museum, Hoovina Hadagali	Bellary District	Archaeological	-	Directorate of Archaeology & Museums, Karnataka	Collection of archaeological and geological artifacts.
26	Government Museum, Raichur	Raichur	Archaeological	-	Directorate of Archaeology & Museums, Karnataka	Collection of archaeological and geological artifacts.
27	Government Museum, Kalaburagi	Gulbarga	Archaeological	-	Directorate of Archaeology & Museums, Karnataka	Collection of archaeological and geological artifacts.
28	Government Museum, Basavakalyana, Bidar District	Bidar District	Archaeological	-	Directorate of Archaeology & Museums, Karnataka	Collection of archaeological and geological artifacts.
29	Museum of Anatomy and Pathology	Manipal	Anatomical Museum	-	Manipal University	Specimen of human body parts and organs, large collection of animal carcasses, skeletons and bones.
30	Tipu Sultan Museum, Srirangapatna	Srirangapatna	Archaeological	-	Archaeological Survey of India	Collection of archaeological and geological artefacts.
31	History Museum	Dharwad	Archaeological	-	Karnataka University	Collection of archaeological artefacts.
32	Geology Museum	Dharwad	Geological	-	Karnataka University	Collection of geological artefacts.
33	Manjusha Museum	Dharmasthala	Antiques, Cars	-	Private collection	Collection of coins, antiques, paintings, artifacts, temple chariots, vintage and classic cars
34	Janapada Loka	Ramanagara	Folk arts	-	Private collection	Collection of the village folk arts
35	R. K. Narayan Museum	Mysore	Historic house museum	2016	Mysore City Corporation	Residence of famous author R. K. Narayan. Books, awards and personal artifacts. Residence was reclaimed by activists prior to demolition. Location: Backside of Akashvani, Mysore. 10.00 am to 5.00 pm. Tuesday Holiday. Free entrance.
36	Museum of Art & Photography (MAP)	Bengaluru	Visual culture	2022	Private museum	A private art museum based in Bengaluru that is a custodian to a collection of Indian art, textiles, photography, craft and design objects spanning from the 12th century to the present. The collection has over 20,000 artworks, predominantly from the Indian subcontinent.
37	Dharwad Regional Science Centre	Dharwad	Science centre and museum	2012	Private museum	Museum is based in Dharwad Karnatak University campus which has artilleries and galleries related to science.
38	shortwaveradiomuseum.com Shortwave Radio Museum & Knowledge Centre	Bangalore	Science & Technology Museum	2021	Private Museum	Museum with 180 Vintage Radios from 1928 to 1970. Valve radios, their technology and history displayed. Also technical knowledge center for youngsters, new generation people, to know about by gone tube technology..

== See also ==
- List of museums in India
