= Halumatha =

Halumatha is a denomination of the Hindu religion mainly followed by Hatkar and Kuruba Gowda. The majority of members of Halumatha are followers of Advaita and Nature Worship.

Halumatha or Palamatha means beliefs of the protectors of the society. In Sanskrit Pal means protect, defend, rule, govern etc. Matha means group view, belief, doctrine etc.

== See also ==
- Dhangar

== References and external Links ==
- halumatha pethà
- Siva and Vishnu are One and the Same.
