= Gaarudi Gombe =

Folk dance from Karnataka, India

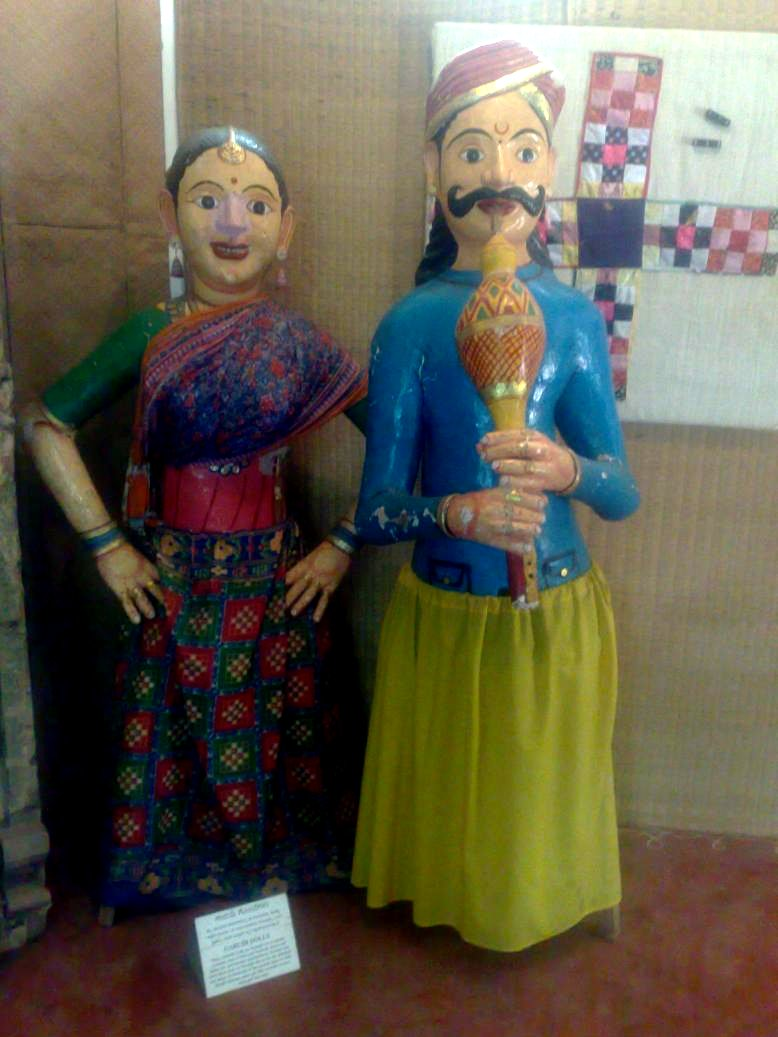
Dolls used in the Gaarudi Gombe dance

Gaarudi Gombe is a folk dance prevalent in the state of Karnataka, India. Dancers adorn themselves with giant doll-suits made of bamboo sticks. The term Gaarudi-Gombe means magical-doll in the native language, Kannada. This dance is performed during major festivals and also in the procession held during the festivities of Mysore Dasara. This dance is also known as Tattiraya in the coastal districts of Karnataka. The term Tattiraya means a person carrying a doll made of bamboo sticks.

== Origin ==
According to a legend, this dance was performed even in the times of the Hindu epic, Mahabharata. When the Hindu Lord Krishna's wife Satyabhama was angry with him, he soothed her anger by wearing a Gaarudi Gombe doll.

== Creation of the dolls ==
The face of the doll is made up of wooden basket with papier-mache applied on it. Using appropriate sketches and colours, the face of the doll is created. Each face is supported by a wooden frame. The dolls can be as much as 10 to 12 feet in height and including the frame, the total weight can be as high as 40 kg. A person fits himself into the frame from the underside and performs the dance carrying this huge structure on his shoulder Provisions are made for the performer to see the outside world through an opening in the frame.

== The dance ==
Due to the heavy weight of the dolls to be carried, most of the performers are men. The dance performance can go on for as much as eight hours, thus the performers take turns carrying the heavy dolls. Though the main idea behind the performance is to create a funny atmosphere, they are also used as a medium to ward off evil spirits.
