= Dollu =

Indian drum

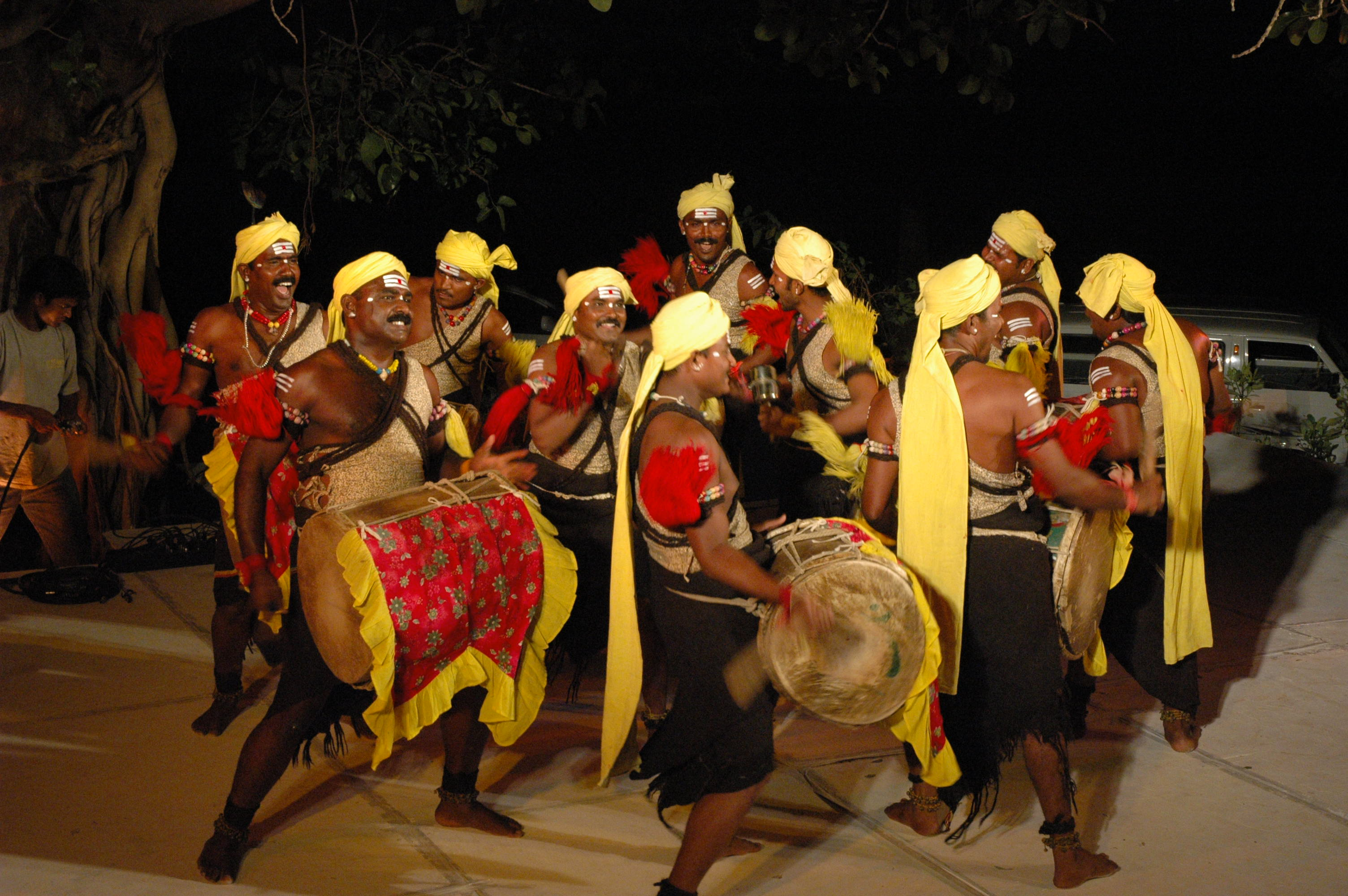
- The dollu being played by Dollu Kunitha dancers

Percussion instrument
- Classification: Percussion Instrument
- Hornbostel–Sachs classification: 211.222.1 Membranophone
- Developed: Karnataka

The dollu is a double-headed drum native to Karnataka, India. It is classified as a membranophone. The heads are made of sheep or goat skin and the frame is made of honne or mango tree wood. The instrument is used mostly in theatrical dances with religious or mythological themes. It is carried by means of a belt or harness and struck with the hand or a short stick. It is loud, low pitched and not particularly tonal.

== Origins ==
Hindu mythology traces the origin of the Dollu to the divine couple Shiva and Parvathi. To pass time, Shiva and Parvathi played games and laid a bet. Whichever one of them lost the bet was to leave Kailasa to live anonymously on Bhuloka (Earth). Shiva lost the bet and moved into a cave, taking the form of a stone. Mayamurthi, Shiva's ardent loyalist, guarded the cave. Over time Parvathi became fed up of managing the universe and decided to send Vayu in search of Shiva, but it was in vain. Narada located the cave, killed Mayamurthi and forced 'Shiva' to return to Kailasa. Shiva, unwilling to leave behind the dead body of his trusted and beloved guard, made a Dollu out of the dead body and carried it to Kailasa. For the reasons of its origins, the Dollu is a popular instrument among Shaivites.

== See also ==
- Dollu Kunitha
- Parvathi
- Shiva
