= Kolata =

Traditional folk dance of the state of Karnataka, India

Kolata is the traditional folk dance of the state of Karnataka, located in Southern India on the western coast. Unlike its North Indian counterpart Dandiya Ras, it comes in two forms. First, it is performed with coloured sticks and usually involves both men and women dancing together. Second, very rigorous play of sticks only by men dancing to folk songs. Sticks here are thick and hard to sustain strong play.

'Cheluvayya Cheluvo Tani tandana', 'Kolu kolanna kolu kole' are very popular music for the soft kolata dance of Karnataka. Kolata of men uses 'Indara Gandhi kondavanna', 'Belisalagonda kare beeja' etc. sung vocally along with the dance.

Cheluvayya Cheluvo Tani tandana kolata is performed by Kannada Kootas around the world for their Ugadi and Kannada Rajyotsava programmes.

There are many types of Kolata, like jade ( ja - day) kolata which means plait Kolata. People here jumble themselves holding long scarves. This jumbling forms a plait.there are many types of jade Kolata including fishtail.
