= Dollu Kunitha =

Indian drum dance

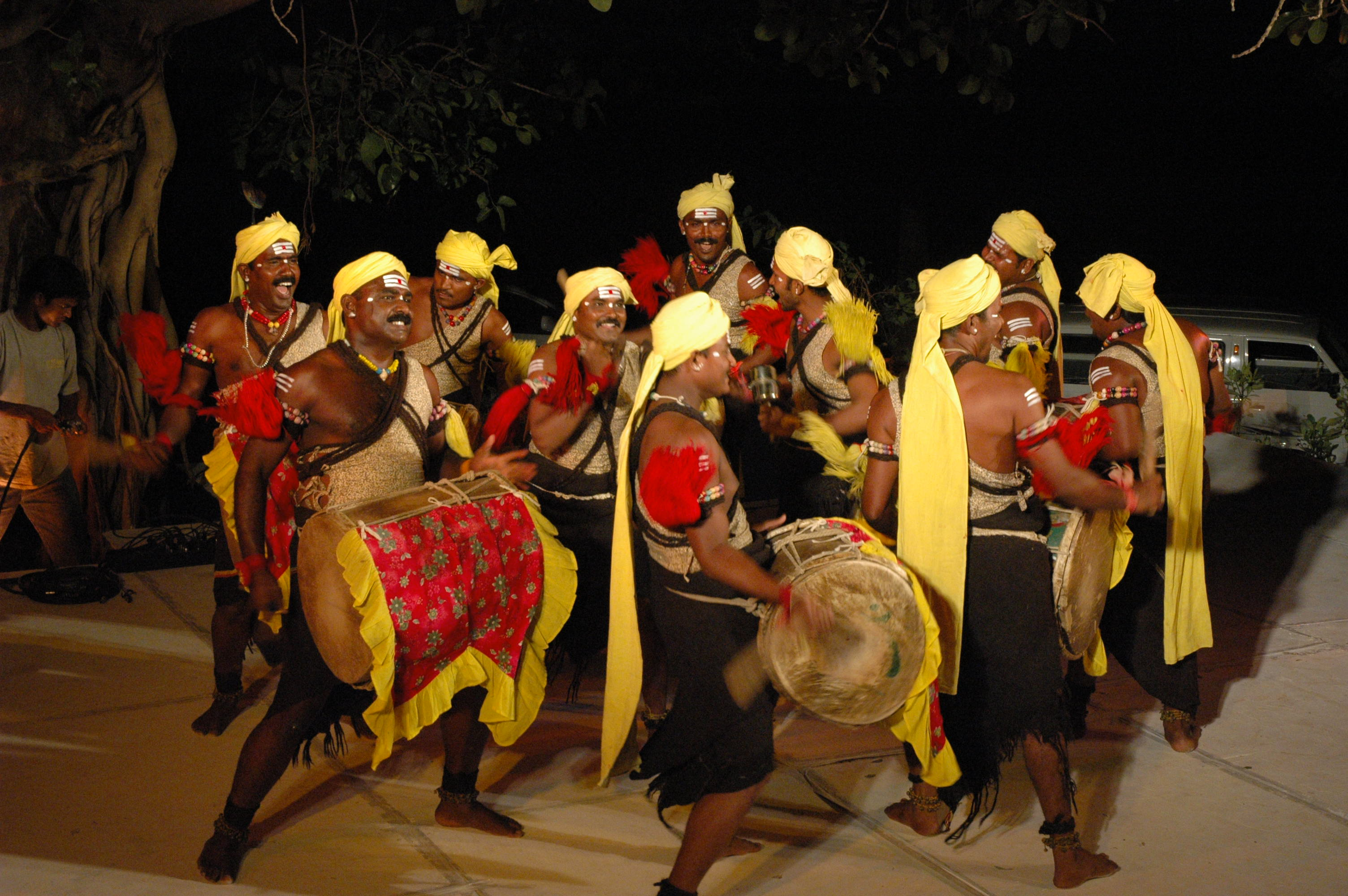
Dollu Kunitha being performed

Dollu Kunitha, is a major popular drum dance of Karnataka.

== Background ==
In all temples of Beereshwara, the major instrument Dollu is hung by means of a thick thread tied to hooks in the ceiling. Every time worship is offered to Beereshwara, there should be an instantaneous beating of the dollu.

Dollu Kunitha - Karnataka Folk Art -Shrikanth Gowdar and team

Dollu Kunitha

This expressive literature its oral tradition goes by the legend called 'Halumatha Purana' or Kuruba Purana. The story is that the demon Dolla-asura worshipped Shiva devotedly and, when Shiva appeared before him, asked him to ask for a boon; that he should be able to swallow Shiva himself, or else he requests immortality which Shiva refuses so that the enraged Dollu swallow's Shiva. Shiva started growing big. The asura, unable to bear the pain, pleaded for Shiva to come out. Shiva tore open the demon, thus killing him, and came out. Shiva used the skin of the asura to make a dollu/drum and gave it to the rustics, his devotees, the “Halu Kurubas”. The “Halu Kuruba” tribes in Shimoga follow this tradition even today.

The performers form a semi-circle and involve in extremely swift and supple movements. The beat is controlled and directed by a leader with cymbals who is positioned in the centre. Slow and fast rhythms alternate and group weaves varied patterns. The costumes are simple. The upper part of the body is usually left bare while a black sheet-rug is tied on the lower body over the `dhooti` or sarong.

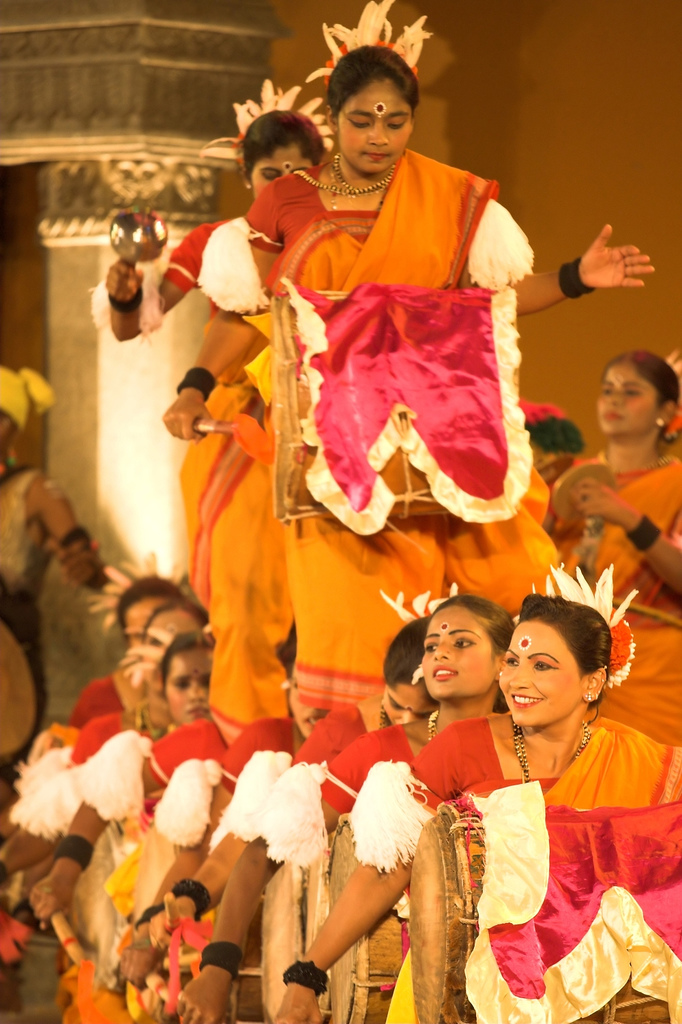
Dollu Kunitha performed by women

Kuruba Gowdas sing with intonation distinct from other kinds of folk singers, tracing the origin of their genealogy, evolution and development over the ages. Dollu dance has gone on uninterruptedly generation after generation with renewed vigour and raciness of performance. Hardly any religious performance of a ritualistic ceremony or any village festival can ever take place without this dance, especially in North Karnataka. On all these occasions, the Dollu dance becomes the very centre of activity around which other important things get built up. Since this dance demands strength, muscle power and the spirit of endurance, only well-built sturdy persons of enough stamina alone can take to it.

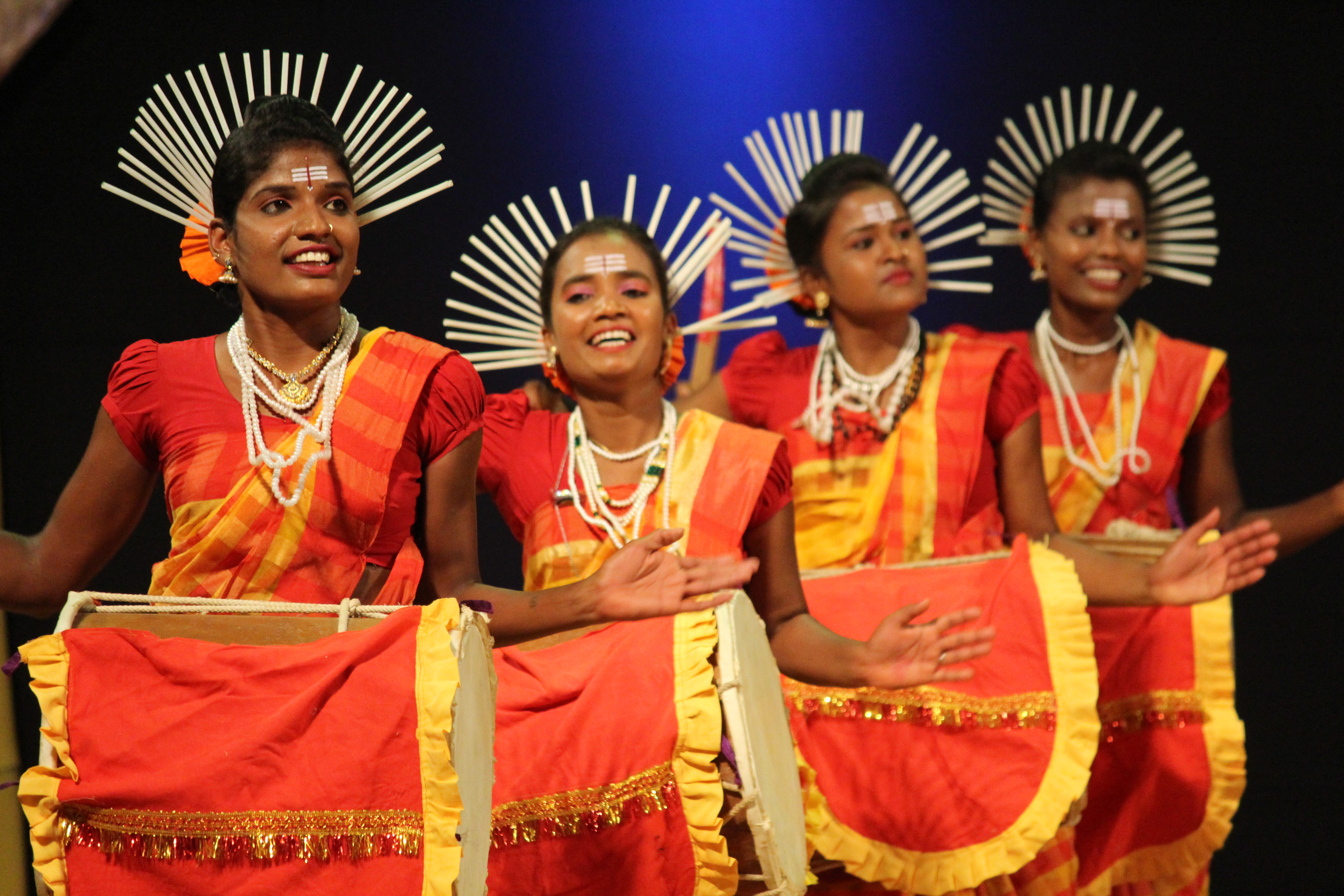
Dollu Kunitha - drum dance of Karnataka.at National folk festival, Thiruvananthapuram, Feb 26, 2017

The troupe consists of about a dozen artistes as dancing partners. Against the background we have tala, tappadi, trumpets, gong and flute, raised to a high-pitched tenor. These instruments are perforce used to reinforce the rich vibrations of Dollu. A miniature model of Dollu, easy to carry in hand, and handle it for beating – is often employed while singing a distinct class of songs-Dollu Songs/Drum Songs. Because there is beating of Dollu here by the fingers.

== See also ==
- Yakshagana
- Veeragase
