= Navika =

Navika or NAVIKA may refer to:

- North America Vishwa Kannada Association, an association of Kannadigas in North America.
- Navika (album), a 2011 album by Montenegrin pop singer Vlado Georgiev.
