= Kannadigas =

Dravidian ethnic group

Kannadigas Kannaḍigaru ಕನ್ನಡಿಗರು
- Cultural flag of the Kannada people

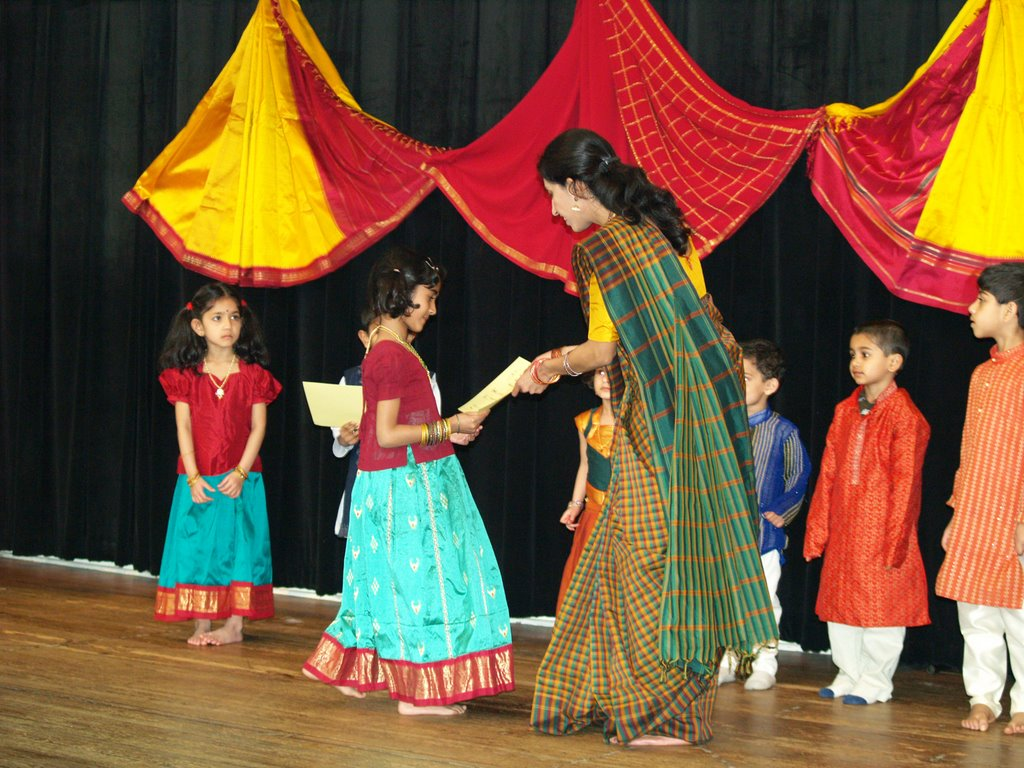
- Kannada schoolchildren celebrating Ugadi

Total population
- c. 52.2 million

Regions with significant populations
- India: 44 million
- UAE: 337,000
- Malaysia: 59,000 (estimated)
- United States: 48,600
- Singapore: 22,000
- Australia: 9700
- Canada: 4000

Languages
- Kannada

Religion
- Majority: Hinduism; Minority: Jainism, Buddhism, Islam, Christianity

Related ethnic groups
- Dravidians; Tuluvas; Konkanis; Kodavas; Telugu; Tamils; Malayalis; Marathas

The Kannadigas or Kannadigaru (Note: Kannadigas is a term obtained by adding the English suffix -s to Kannadiga to make it plural. Kannadigaru is the plural form in Kannada. Kannadiga is a masculine term; the feminine term is Kannadathi. Kannadigaru is essentially a masculine term as opposed to Kannadatiyaru but is used when the genders of group members are unclear in context.) (Kannada: ಕನ್ನಡಿಗರು (Note: Also ಕನ್ನಡದವರು (Sanskrit: कन्नडदवरु, romanized: Kannaḍadavaru) or ಕನ್ನಡಜನ (Sanskrit: कन्नडजन, romanized: Kannaḍajana))), often referred to as Kannada people, are a Dravidian ethnic group primarily native to the southern Indian state of Karnataka and its surrounding regions. They natively speak Kannada, which belongs to the Dravidian language family. Kannada stands among 30 of the most widely spoken languages of the world as of 2001.

After the Mauryas, parts of Karnataka were variously ruled by dynasties who were from the outside. One theory posits that the Vijayanagara Empire, one of the region's most renowned, was founded by Kannadigas who served as commanders in the Hoysala Empire's army stationed in the Tungabhadra region.

The Kannada language has written inscriptions dating back as far as 450 CE. Kannada literature is mostly composed of treatises on various topics and poems on religious works. Kannada architecture is dominated by stone-carved sculptured palaces, temples and traditional wooden folk houses known as thotti mane and chowki mane. Many of religious architectures built during ancient and medieval period are today UNESCO World Heritage sites.

== History ==
Minor dynasties that played an important role in the development of Kannada language, culture and polity were Tuluva Dynasty of Canara, Rattas of Saundatti (Belgaum), Guttas of Guttal (Dharwad region), Banas of Kolar, Nolambas of Nolambavadi, Vaidumbas, Chengalvas, Kongalvas, Sendrakas of Nagarkhanda (Banavasi province), Yalahanka Nadaprabhu Kempegowda, Sindas of Yelburga (Bijapur-Gulbarga), Kadamba of Hangal.

In addition, other well known kingdoms that patronized Kannada poets and Kannada language were:

- Eastern Chalukyas
- Kakatiya dynasty
- Seuna Yadavas of Devagiri
- Shilahara
- Kadambas of Goa
- The Karnata Dynasty (founded by Nanyadeva I) of Mithila and Nepal,
- The Chalukyas of Gujarat,
- The Chalukyas of Vengi (Eastern Chalukya),
- The Seuna Yadavas of Devagiri,
- The Rashtrakuta family ruling from Berar (modern Amravati district, Maharashtra),
- The Rashtrakutas branch of Gujarat (Lata branch),
- The Sena dynasty of Bengal

== Culture ==
=== Architecture ===
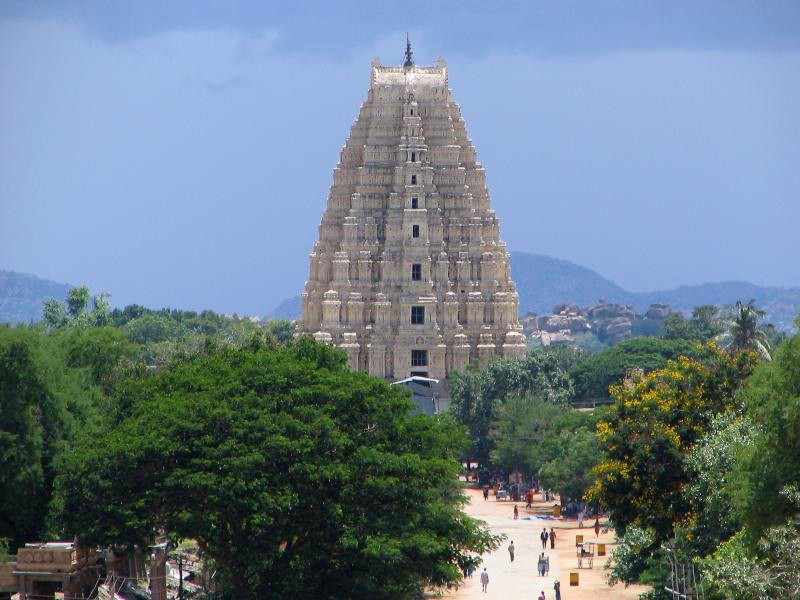
Hampi, capital of Vijayanagara Empire

Architecture and sculpture has been the epitome of art in Karnataka. Be it the musical pillars of Hampi, which is listed as a UNESCO World Heritage Site, the ekashila (monolithic) statue of Gommateshvara Bahubali that was voted by Indians as the first of Seven Wonders of India the Yelu Sutthina Kote of Chitradurga (The Fort of Seven Laps) cutting across hill or the wholesomeness of carvings of temples which bared down all desires to be left out of it and formless (above all forms) all encompassing — the inner garbhagrihas. The temples of Karnataka had in them many shaili or varieties to credit. A majority of the temples were built using the locally available stones.

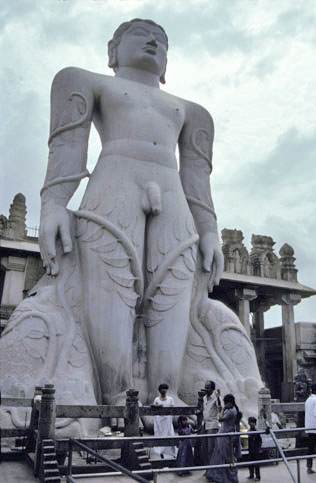
57-foot monolithic statue of Gommateshvara Bahubali dated 978–993 AD.

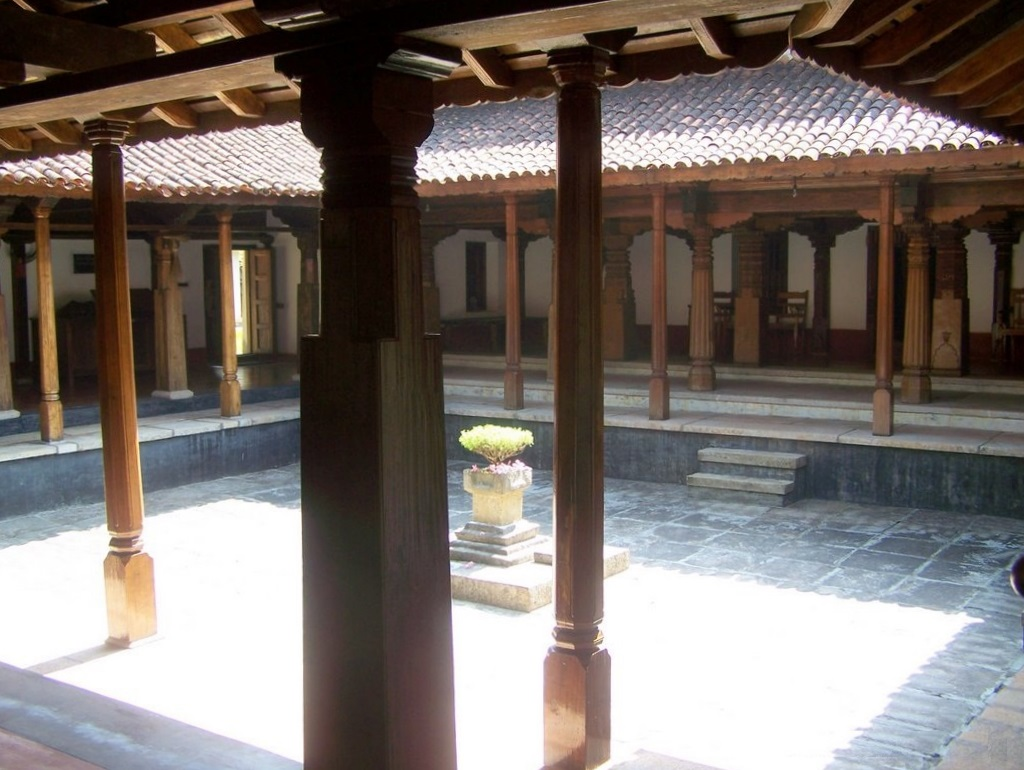
Traditional folk house with courtyard and tulasi katte.

Some of the places of interest are:

- Ellora Caves houses the Kailasanatha temple of Ellora was built by the Rashtrakutas Dynasty and is declared a World Heritage Site by UNESCO

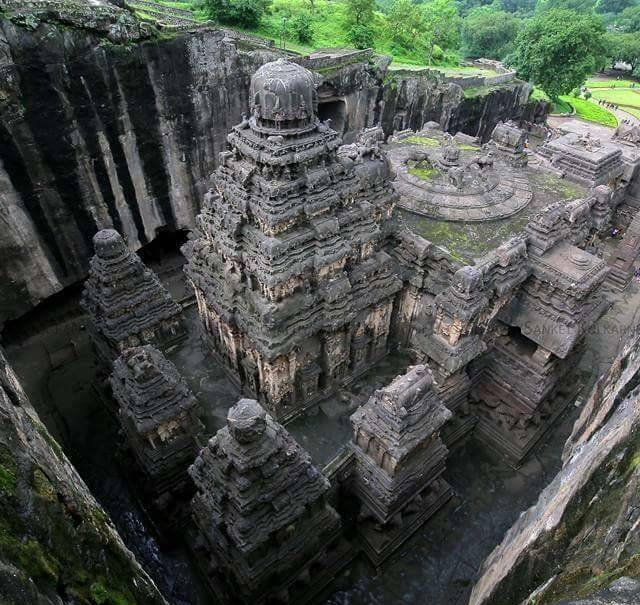
Kailasa Temple, Ellora built by Krishna I

- Elephanta Caves island was a summer resort of Rashtrakuta kings and is declared a World Heritage Site by UNESCO.
- Konark Sun Temple also called Surya Devalaya and Black Pagoda built in coastline of Odisha, India by Narasimhadeva I of the Eastern Ganga Dynasty is declared a World Heritage Site by UNESCO.
- Ajanta Caves have sculptures of Rashrakutas and Badami Chalukyas and is declared a World Heritage Site by UNESCO.
- Hampi houses the ruins of the Vijayanagara Empire and is declared a World Heritage Site by UNESCO
- Pattadakal is a vesara style of Hindu temple architecture, a UNESCO World Heritage Site
- Badami cave temples, a regal capital of the Badami Chalukyas, now famous for its sandstone cave temples
- Aihole is known for its many temples and inscriptions of Chalukya Pulakeshin II in the Old Kannada script
- Basavakalyan, a major centre of social and religious movement in the 12th century by Basava, consists of temples in Chalukyan architecture
- Itagi is home to the Shiva temple built by Vikramāditya. Considered to be the best specimen of Kalyani Chalukyan art, it has as many as 68 decorated pillars, an ornate tower and a doorway of great workmanship
- Lakkundi
- Belur
- Halebeedu
- Shravanabelagola
- Saumyakeshava Temple, Nagamangala
- Lakshminarayana Temple, Hosaholalu
- Mallikarjuna Temple, Basaralu
- Ikkeri
- Keladi
- Banavasi

Pioneer sculptors include:

- Amarashilpi Jakanachari
- Ruvari Malithamma
- Chavundaraya
- Siddalinga Swami
- K. Venkatappa

Modern day contemporaries include visionary architects such as:

- Mokshagundam Visvesvaraya, father of modern Indian engineering, Kannambadi Katte or KRS dam
- Kengal Hanumanthaiah, Vidhana Soudha

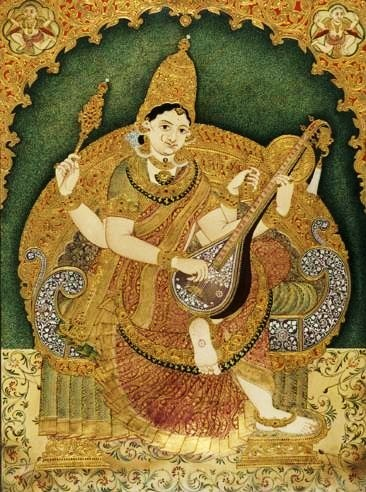
Mysore religious icon painting depicting Goddess Saraswathi

Modern Kannada art is primarily influenced by Raja Ravi Varma and his realism. Popular visual arts generally revolve around puppetry. Most traditional religious paintings include works that are very colorful.

These are many of the places where art is displayed.

- Karnataka Chitrakala Parishat
- Chowdiah Memorial Hall
- Gaayana Samaja
- Ranga Shankara
- Nrithya Grama
- Ravindra Kalakshetra
- Gubbi Veeranna Rangamandira
- Janapada Loka
- Rangayana
- Ninasam
- Prabhat Kalavidaru

=== Music ===
Dasa sahitya is the literature of Bhakti movement composed by devotees in honor of Lord Vishnu or one of his avatars. Dasa is literally "servant" in Kannada and sahitya is literature. Haridasas ("servants of God") were preachers of Bhakti to Vishnu. The bhakti literature of these Haridasas is collectively referred to as Dasa Sahitya. It is composed in the Kannada language.

The Haridasas richly contributed to the heritage of Karntataka music. They made an indelible impression on the religious and cultural life of Karnataka by spreading the didactic teachings in a musical form to the hearts of the common folk. Like other doyens of Indian classical music, these scholars offered prayer to Vishnu through music, called naadopasana. The Lord is described as Samagana priya, and bhakti through music is the most preferred path to 'reach' Him.

The Haridasa compositions are popularly known as Devaranamas. Compositions like Krishna Nee Begane Baaro, Venkatachala Nilayam, Jagadoddharana, Tamboori Meetidava are some of the many examples of their scholarly work.

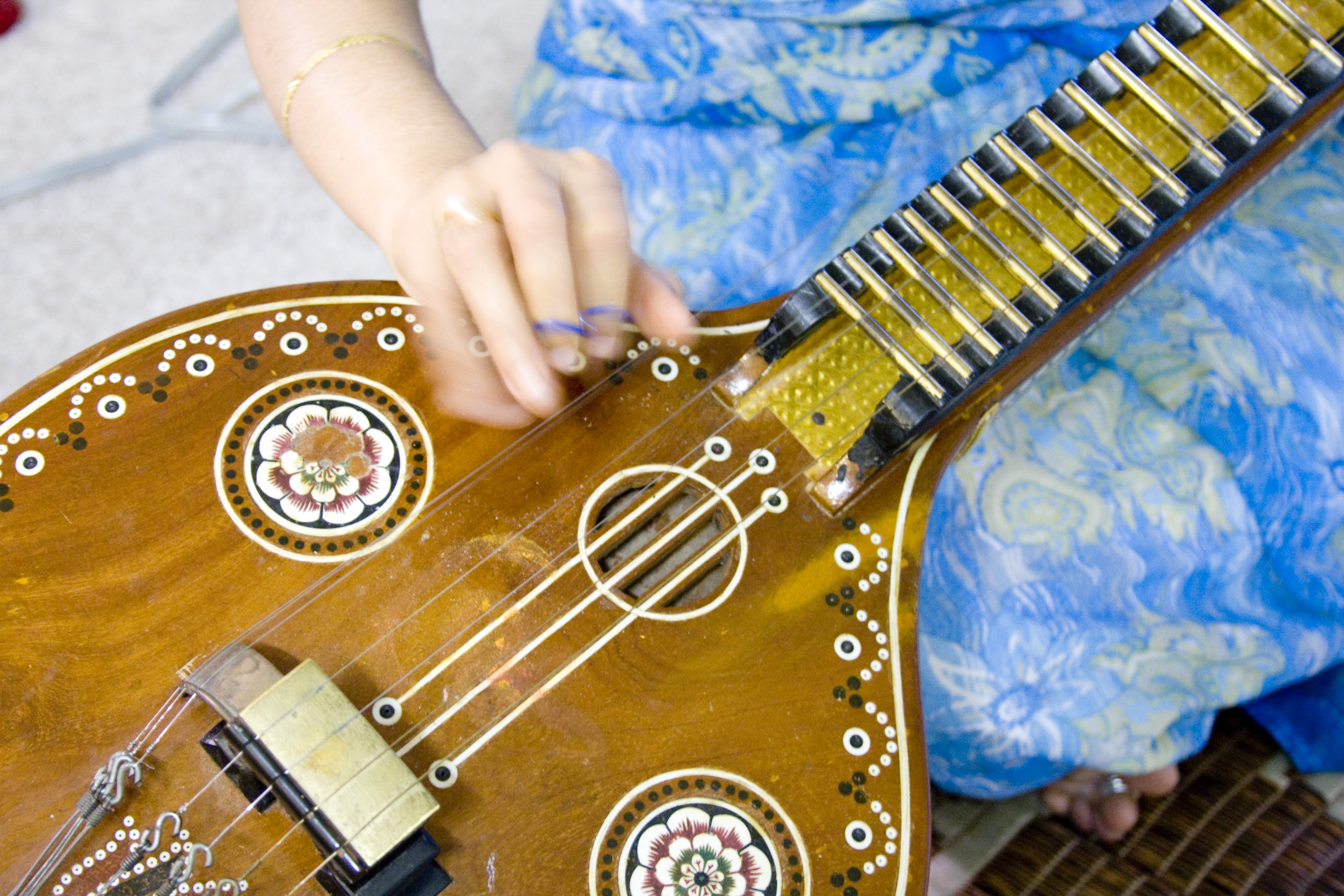
Veena is the most commonly used instrument in Carnatic music.

Some noted Haridasas or composers of Dasa Sahitya are:

- Purandara Dasa, widely regarded as Karnataka Sangeeta Pitamaha or "Father of Carnatic music"
- Kanaka Dasa, a younger contemporary of Purandara Dasa
- Sripadaraja
- Vyasatirtha
- Vadirajatirtha
- Jagannatha Dasa
- Jayatirtha
- Gopala Dasa
- Vijaya Dasa
- Naraharitirtha

One of the oldest forms of music in the region is Karnataka Shastreeya Sangeetha which has evolved over ages. Both Hindustani and Karnataka variations are respected and nurtured by Kannadigas. Bhavageete and Sugama Sangeetha are some innovations. Other forms of music include Gamaka, Joogera Pada and Lavani. Yakshagana is considered a unique and indigenous form of both music and dance of Karnataka.

Contemporary musical thespians are:

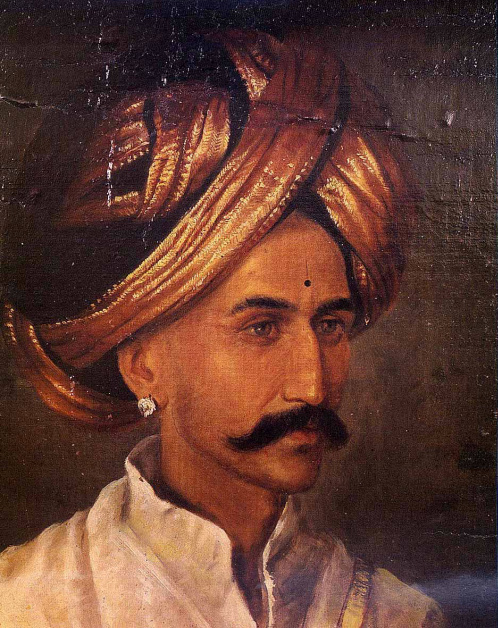
Veene Sheshanna (1852-1926) notable Veena player and composer.

- Pandit Bhimsen Joshi, recipient of the Bharat Ratna — India's highest civilian honor
- Gangubai Hangal, awarded both Padma Bhushan and Padma Vibhushan in 1971 and 2002 respectively
- C. Aswath, recipient of Karnataka Rajyotsava Prashasti for his immense contribution to Bhavageete
- Veene Doraiswamy Iyengar
- Puttaraj Gawai
- Honnappa Bhagavathar
- P. Kalinga Rao
- Balappa Hukkeri
- Mallikarjuna Mansur
- Basavaraja Rajguru
- Veene Sheshanna
- T. Chowdiah
- Sawai Gandharva
- Kumar Gandharva
- Mysore Ananthaswamy
- Mysore Manjunath

=== Theater ===
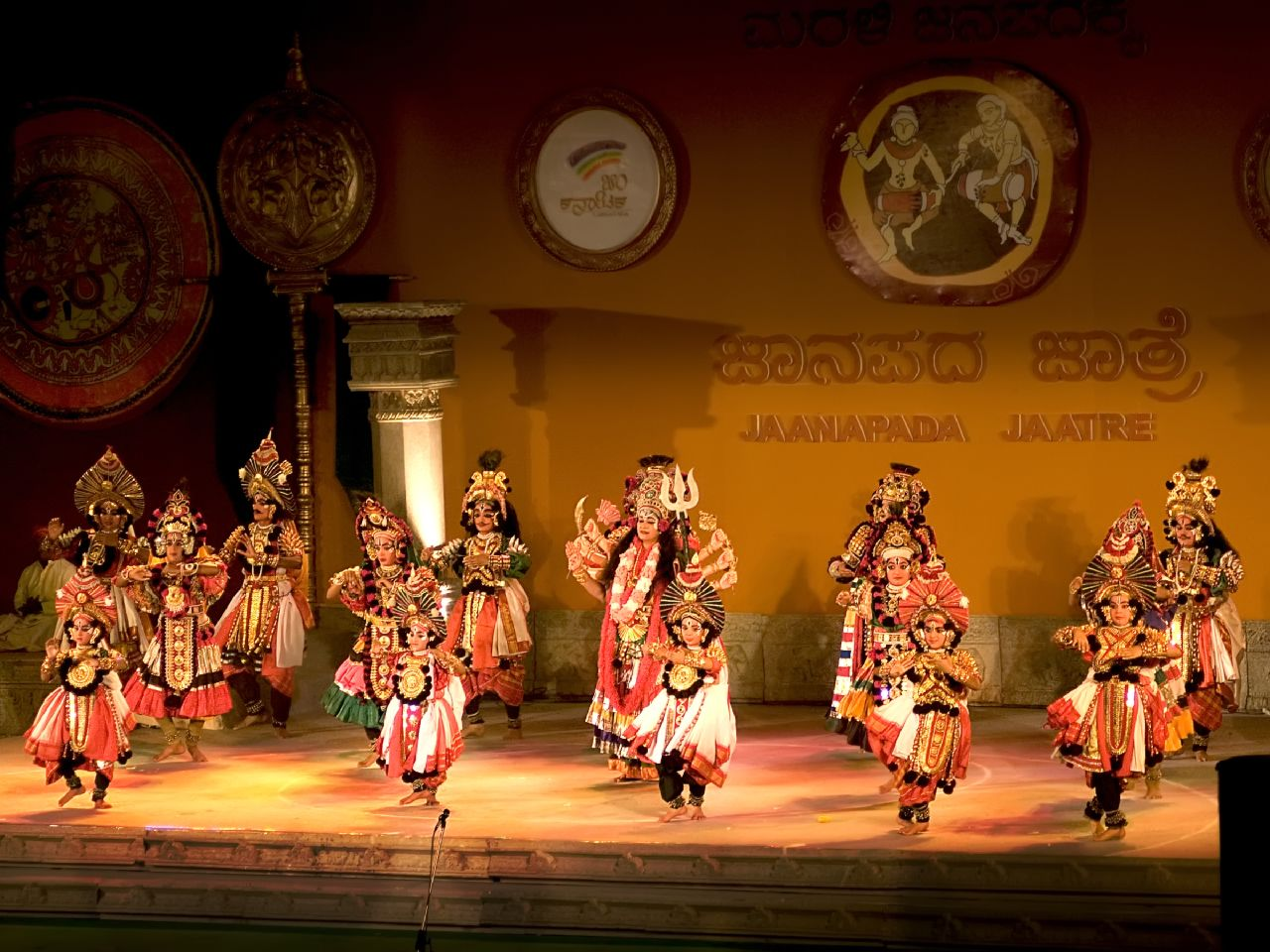
Jaanapada artists at government-sponsored Jaanapadha Jaatre

Rangabhoomi or the theatre culture is a tradition with Kannadigas. While a lot of gadhya (literature) is written in praise of the heroic characters of the epics and puranas, there are major works depicting the kings and their rule. These are called Naataka (plays having wide-ranging stages for performance like Rangamancha staged in either theatres or on streets) and Bayalata (ಬಯಲಾಟ). As its etymology indicates, bayalu means open-air field and ata means theatre. In southern Karnataka, the eastern and western varieties of Yakshagana are termed Bayalata, whereas in the north, several other distinct genres are included under the name.

Harikathe which covers an entire night is another form where one (or more) person tells a story in an outstanding manner accompanied by music at background. It is a common feature to narrate battles, stories, devotions or vratha in front of temples on auspicious days like Dasara and Maha Shivaratri. Harikathe is a composite art form composed of story telling, poetry, music, drama, dance, and philosophy. Today, late-night Harikathe sessions are organized overseas where Kannadiga population is considerable.

Togalu gombeyaata, is a unique puppet show form of shadow puppetry, Gombe ata involves story telling using character made from dolls, Whose performance is controlled by the humans in the background using invisible threads

Vasanta Habba (ವಸಂತ ಹಬ್ಬ), which means "spring festival" in Kannada is a cultural festival organized by the Nrityagram foundation in Bengaluru. It is a very popular event and is considered the classical Woodstock of India. First held in 1990, it now attracts the best musicians, dancers and cultural artists from across India. Similarly, Bengaluru Habba (ಬೆಂಗಳೂರು ಹಬ್ಬ) is a congregation of art performances at places in the city which is successfully celebrated every year. It aims to provide aesthetic entertainment to a wide cultural, social and demographic cross-section of the city's people by partnering with corporates and other stakeholders since 2003. In 2006, the Government of Karnataka tried to bring the folklore and art into the city of Bengaluru by initiating Jaanapada Jaatre which was hugely successful and received well by art lovers. It is usually held on select weekends in Lalbagh and other parts of the city.

Some famous theatrical, cinematic and television personalities like T P Kailasam, Gubbi Veeranna, C. Honappa Bhagavathar, G V Iyer, Dr. Rajkumar, Puttanna Kanagal, Kalpana, B. S. Ranga, B V Karanth, Girish Kasaravalli, Shankar Nag, T.S. Nagabharana, T N Seetharam have contributed for its richness.

=== Dance forms ===
The mystic and spirited reliving of legends and epics are the major depictions in dance forms. With the theatre of battle scenes of heroism, loyalty and treachery, colour and pageantry are the main subjects. More are adapted with the course of nature and seasons adding colour to the harvesting seasons. Tribal forms of dance can be found limited in the regions inhabited by Soligas, of which Pinasee is a traditional dance form. The people of Kodagu in the Western Ghats also have their own dance forms.

Some of the folk dances and classical dance forms in Karnataka include:

- Dollu Kunitha, a popular drum dance accompanied by singing
- Veeragase, It is vigorous dance which involves very intense energy-sapping movements performed by jangamas
- Kamsale, is a folk dance performed by the devotees of lord Male mahadeshwara with rhythmic instrument
- Somana Kunitha / Chamana kunitha, a Form of mask dance, Somana kunitha is ritualistic performance during the festivals in temples, prominently glorifying village deities worshipped by the people since ages
- Pooja Kunita, A religious folk dance of Karnataka which is performed by holding Shakti devata on the head
- Suggi Kunitha, is performed during harvesting festival in Karnataka, Haalakki tribe living in coastal part of north canara perform this dance at the time of holy harvesting festival
- Goravara Kunitha is a treditional dance of kurubas which is dedicated to lord mialara linga
- Yakshagana is a form of dance which is popular in coastal Karnataka
- Bhootha (Gana) Aradhane /Buta Kola, This form of dance is widely performed in coastal regions. A dancer personifying a bhoota (holy spirit) dances around the plinth with sword & jingling bells.
- Gaarudi Gombe, where dancers adorn themselves with giant doll-suits made of bamboo sticks
- Kolata, a stick dance.
- Huttari, is a form of dance performed by Kodavas during harvest festival
- Moodalapaya, is the eastern form of Yakshagana which is popular in North Karnataka
- Bayalata, featuring stories of Puranas rendered as dance
- Bharatanatyam is classical dance of Karnataka, too. It is referred to as Bharata- Natya in Kannada. The similar dance content was discussed in the Kannada text Manasollasa, written by Someshwara lll.
- Jaggahalige Mela, is performed in hubli-dharwad region on the auspicious occasion of Holi & ugadi
- Karaga (festival), is celebrated annually which is dedicated to draupadi, Bengaluru Karaga is a notable event.

=== Martial arts ===
The martial arts more prevalent in parts of North Karnataka with Garadi Mane present in every village and a head to train the youngsters into fit individuals. Kusthi, Malla Yuddha, Kathi Varase (which can be seen depicted in Veeragase and similar to sword fighting), Malla Kambha (gymnastics on a pole structure with/without rope) are some of the prominent arts practised.

The Mysore Odeyars arrange kaalaga or fights like Vajra Mushti during Dasara festival which is made less frightening these days as they are publicly staged. Rock lifting, Bull race, Kusthi, and Kabaddi are popular sports.

Yogasana, Praanayama and health-related camps are very popular throughout the state and some of the best Yoga practitioners can be found here. Art of Living is one such organization immensely popular all over the world.

- Malladihalli Sri Raghavendra Swami
- K. Pattabhi Jois

=== Cuisine ===
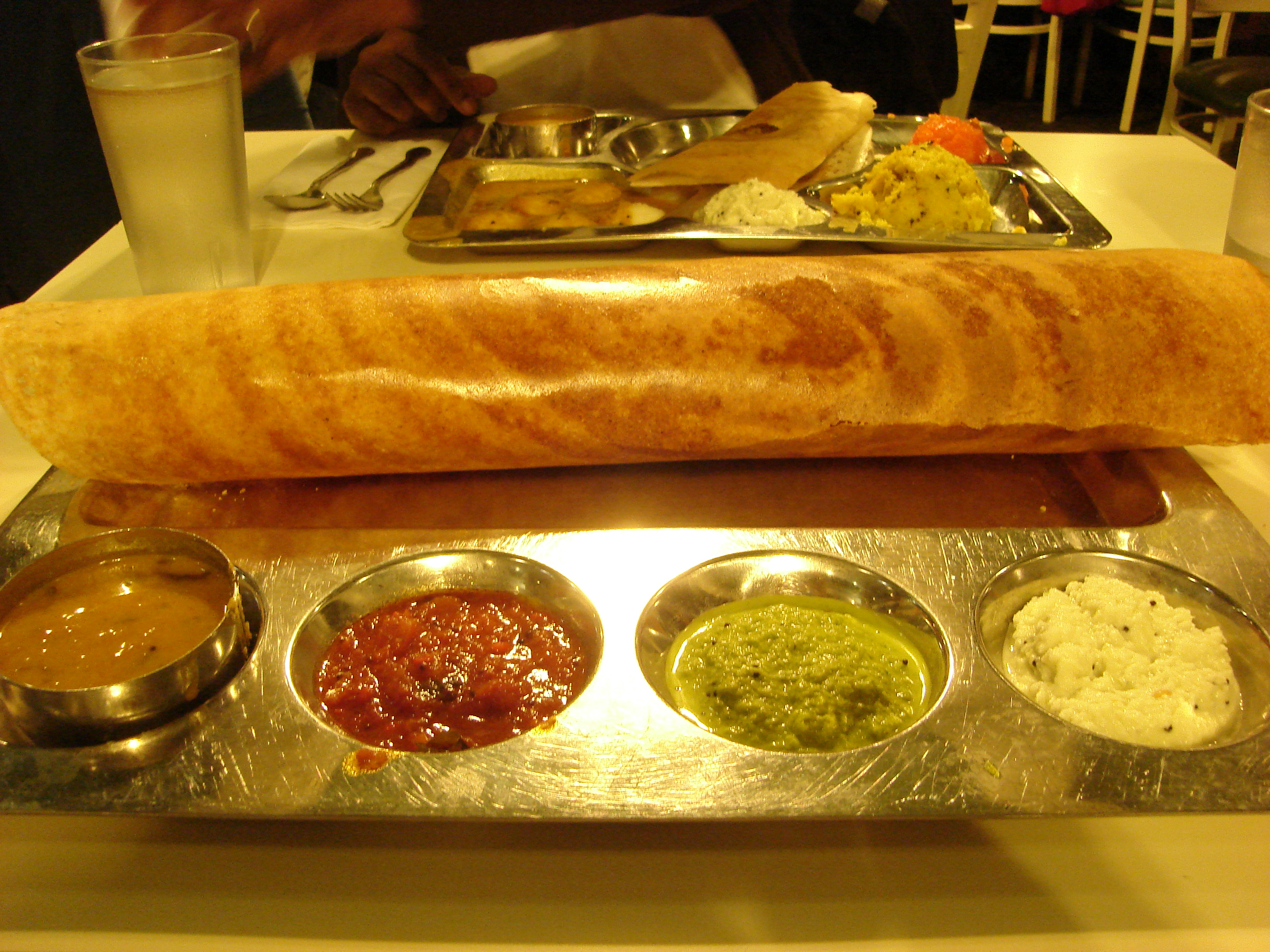
Masale Dosey

The cuisine of Karnataka includes many vegetarian and non-vegetarian dishes. One of the earliest Indian books with chapters on culinary preparations, Manasollasa, was from Karnataka, written during the reign of Kannada emperor Someshwara III. The varieties reflect influences from the food habits of many regions and communities from the three neighbouring South Indian states, as well as the state of Maharashtra to its north. Soopa Shastra is notable medieval Kannada literally work written in 1508 A.D on the subject of Kannada cuisine.

Some typical everyday dishes in Kannadigas homes include Bisi Bele Bath, Jolada rotti, Ragi rotti, Akki rotti, Masale rotti, Saaru, Huli, Benne dose, Ragi mudde, Chitranna, Chapathi, Poori, Avalakki, Puri Usli, Puliyogare (tamarind rice) and Uppittu. Dosa (food) origin is linked to Udupi cuisine. A recipe for dosa (as dosaka) can be found in Manasollasa. Plain and rave Idli, Masala Dosa or Masale dosey and Maddur Vade are very popular in South Karnataka. Neer dosa is a delicacy from coastal Karnataka. Davanagere Benne dose is a notable flavourful dosa. Kadubu, a kind of rice dumplings, is a popular and ethnic food in South Malnad regions such as Sakaleshpura, Mudigere, Somwarapete, etc. and is consumed with huchellu (black sesame) chutney.

Among sweets, Mysore Pak, Dharwad pedha, Chiroti, Jalebi, and Belagavi Kunda are well known. Hurnagadab, Karadantu of Gokak and Amingarh, Obbattu (bele hurana holige), Kaayi Kadubu, Kaayi (coconut) Obbattu, Shenga holige, Thambittu (tamta), Karji Kai, Ellu unde, Ginna, Halubai, Rave Unde, Otthu Shavige Kaayi haalu, a variety of Payasa (Shavige payasa, kadle bele payasa, Hesaru bele payasa, Sabakki payasa), Sajjige, and Kesari bat are popular sweets. Indis (chutneys) of Karnataka have a very distinct taste and flavour. Some popular ones include Shenga indi (groundnut), Agashi indi, Karal indi, Inichi indi, and Mavina indi (mango). Similarly, Karnataka uppinakai (pickles) too are very distinct from the rest, like Mavina thokku (fine mango pickles), Nimbekai uppinakai (lemon pickles), Tenga Mavina uppinakai (entire mango pickle), gaajri uppinkai (carrot pickle), and menshinikai uppinakai (chili pickle).

Some non-vegetarian dishes include: Dhonne biriyani, Bamboo biriyani, Mutton pulao, Mangalore fish curry, fish fry, Mangalore mutton and chicken Sukka, Mandya naati style Baaduta, Ragi mudde - Koli saaru, rice with Mutton sambar, Egg curry, Pork curry, chicken sambar, or gravy, and Boti gojju, among others.

=== Clothing ===
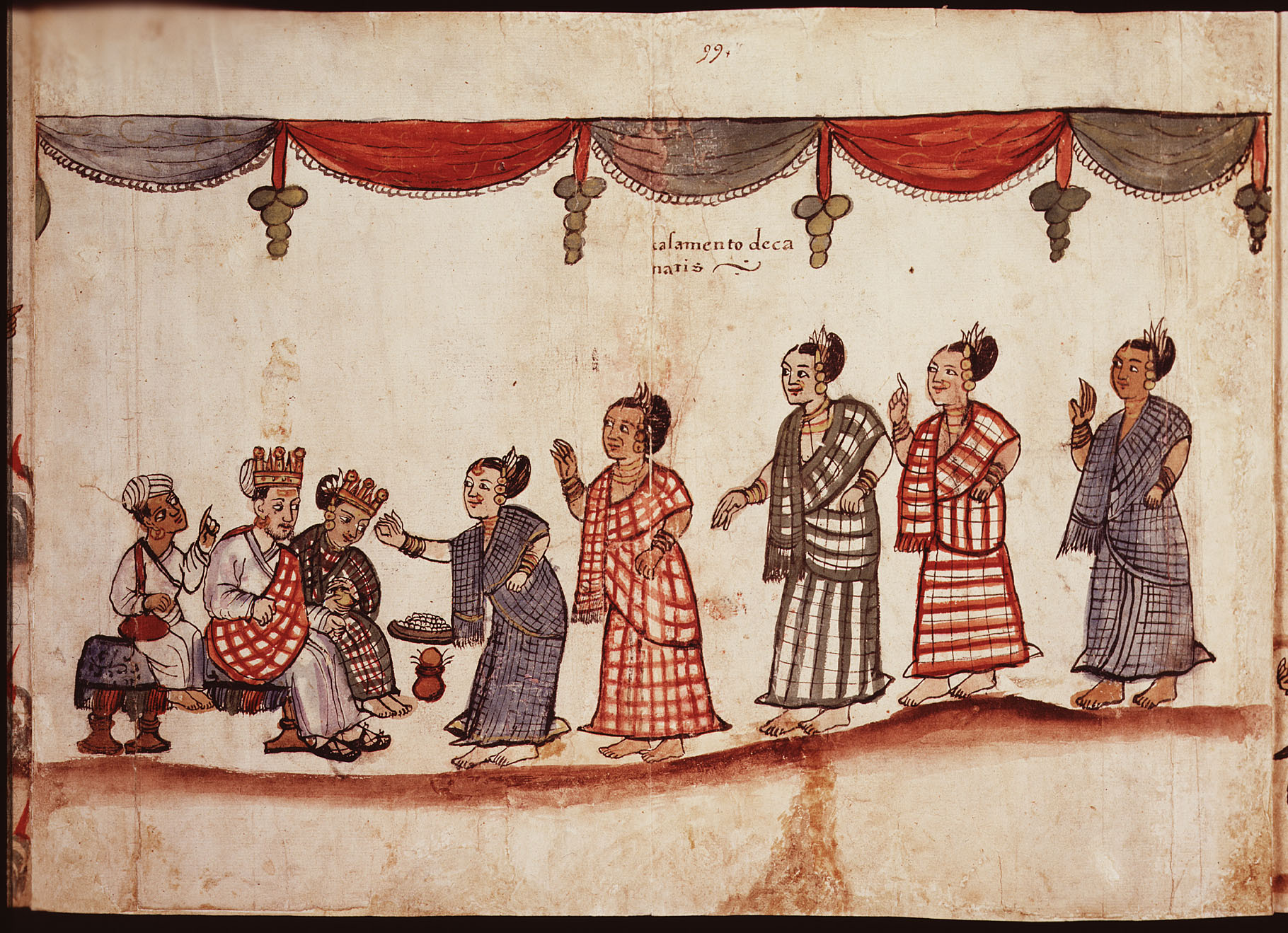
Kannada wedding ceremony depicted by Codice Casanatense. The inscription reads; "Marriage of Kanarese", circa 1540.

The costume of Kannada people varies from place to place. The Kannadiga male costume mainly includes panche (some tie as Kachche) or lungi (wrapping style depends on the region), Angi a traditional form of shirt and Peta turban worn in Mysuru style or Dharwad style. Shalya is a piece of long cloth which is put on shoulder commonly seen in the countryside. Many use Khadi in their clothing until date of which politicians are prominent ones.

Female costumes include Seere of which Ilakal Seere and Mysore silk are famous. Seere has variations of draping depending on regions like Kodagu, North and South Karnataka and Karavali. Young women in some parts of Karnataka traditionally wear the Langa davani before marriage. Kasuti is a form of embroidery work which is very popularly sought-after art on dress and costumes.

An urban male costume comprises trousers, a shirt and sandals, while that of females include shalwar. Jeans are popular among the youth, while new age Khadi/silk printed with art or emblem also find place.

== Literature ==
Kannada literature is filled with literary figures and pioneers all through. With an unbroken literary history of over a thousand years, the excellence of Kannada literature continues into the present day: works of Kannada literature have received 8 Jnanpith awards and 56 Sahitya Akademi awards.

Pampa, Ranna and Ponna are considered as three jewels of Old Kannada (Halegannada). Janna was another notable poet of this genre.

Basavanna, Akka Mahadevi, Allama Prabhu, Vidyaranya, Harihara, Raghavanka, Kumara Vyasa, Sarvajna, Purandara Dasa, Kanaka Dasa, Shishunala Shareefa, Raghavendra Swami etc. were pioneers of Nadugannada. All these have been involved with social and cultural movements and hence this was the golden era of literature which brought about a renaissance in Kannada literature. This period was amalgamation of literature works which crossed across boundaries under a vast roof encompassed by art and theatre fields. The literature works of Kannada in Navodaya is crowned with eight Jnanpith awards.

Some of the contemporary active institutions of Kannada literature are:

- Kannada Sahitya Parishat
- Academies operating as its wings include Tulu, Konkani, Kodava, and Urdu. A Byari academy is the latest academy opened in Karnataka.

== Kannada journalism ==
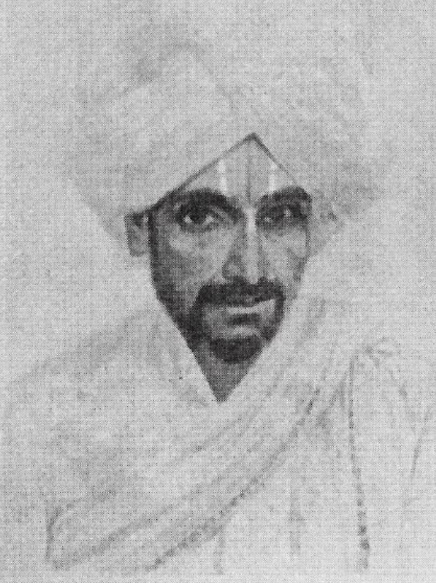
Bhashyam Bhashyachar published "Mysuru Vrittanta Bodhini" in 1859.

Mangaluru Samachara was the first Kannada news publication as early as 1843 by German missionary Hermann Mögling. Followed by Bhashyam Bhashyachar who is credited with publishing the first Kannada weekly from Mysore "Mysuru Vrittanta Bodhini" in 1859 under the royal patronage of Krishnaraja Wadiyar III. Shortly after Indian independence in 1948, K. N. Guruswamy founded The Printers (Mysore) Private Limited and began publishing two newspapers, Deccan Herald and Prajavani. Presently the Times of India and Vijaya Karnataka are the largest-selling English and Kannada newspapers respectively. D. V. Gundappa was a notable Kannada journalist, he was awarded third-highest civilian award Padmabhushan in 1974.

List of a few major newspapers:

- Prajavani
- Samyuktha Karnataka
- Kannadaprabha
- Udayavani
- Vijayavani
- Hosa Digantha
- Vishwavani News
- Vijaya Karnataka

== Notable people ==
=== Religious leaders ===
- Shivakumara Swami, Siddaganga Matha, Tumkur, Karnataka
- Balagangadharanatha Swamiji, Sri Adichunchanagiri Maha Samsthana Math
- Shivamurthy Shivacharya Mahaswamiji
- Taralabalu Jagadguru Brihanmath, Sirigere
- Beerendra Keshava Tarakananda Puri

=== Gandhian philosophers ===
- Kadidal Manjappa former chief minister of Karnataka
- H. Narasimhaiah
- Kollur Mallappa
- B D Jatti - former president and vice president of India
- Mailara Mahadevappa- only person from Karnataka to accompany Gandhiji in Dandi salt sathyagraha/march
- Gudleppa Hallikeri

=== Modern science and technology ===
- N. K. Naik - Professor Emeritus at IIT Bombay.
- Raja Ramanna - Indian nuclear scientist and father of the Indian nuclear bomb.
- Dr. M.C. Modi - Ophthalmologist and humanist.
- C. N. R. Rao - Notable Solid-state scientist and chairman of Science Advisory Council of GOI. Recently awarded with India's highest civilian award Bharat Ratna
- K. N. Shankara - Indian space scientist and master in satellite payload technology.
- Shakuntala Devi - Mathematics.
- Vivek Murthy American physician serves as the 19th Surgeon General of the United States.
- Narayan Hosmane - Biochemistry and Cancer research.
- S. K. Shivkumar - Scientist, ISRO telemetry (ISRO), associated with Chandrayaan-1 lunar probe.
- Shrinivas Kulkarni - Professor of astrophysics and planetary science at Caltech, United States of America.
- S. Shankar Sastry - Dean of the College of Engineering at the University of California, Berkeley.
- L. S. Shashidhara - Developmental biologist, geneticist and a professor and chair of Biology at Indian Institutes of Science Education and Research (IISER).
- M. Visvesvaraya - Indian scholar and engineer, who also served as the Diwan of Mysore

=== Environmentalists ===
Karnataka is one of the few states which, while a leading contributor for GDP of the country and home for industries, has preserved its forests and wildlife. The evergreen Sahyadri and Western Ghats are home to protected Wildlife of Karnataka. The Kannada culture protects and balances Kaadu (forest) and Naadu (state) as can be seen. Although seen scantly still the state enjoys the diversity owing to tribal sects of Soliga, Badaga, Jenu Kuruba, Hakki Pikki, Lambani, Siddis and other inhabitants of forests. See Appiko Chaluvali.

Noted environmentalists include:

- Ullas Karanth (tiger research biologists/zoologist)
- Tulsi Gowda
- Saalumarada Thimmakka
- Suresh Heblikar
- Poornachandra Tejaswi (ornithologist / littérateur)
- Snake Shyam
- Krupakar-Senani

=== Current cricketers ===
- KL Rahul
- Prasidh Krishna
- Manish Pandey
- Mayank Agarwal
- Abhimanyu Mithun
- Vinay Kumar
- Stuart Binny
- Sreenath Arvind
- Krishnappa Gowtham
- R Samarth
- Shreyas Gopal

=== Retired cricketers ===
- Anil Kumble
- Rahul Dravid
- Javagal Srinath
- Gundappa Vishwanath
- Vijay Bhardwaj
- Venkatesh Prasad
- B.S. Chandrashekhar
- E. A. S. Prasanna
- Roger Binny
- Sunil Joshi
- Syed Kirmani
- Sujith Somasunder
- Dodda Ganesh
- David Johnson

=== Caste and Communities ===
Like other ethnolinguistic groups in India, Kannada speaking people form several distinct communities. The two single biggest communities numerically are the Lingayat and the Vokkaliga from North and South Karnataka respectively. while Scheduled Castes make up the largest cohesive group of communities. There are also numerous OBC (other backward communities) including the former pastoralist community of Kuruba, Scheduled Tribes like the Boya/Valmiki, scheduled castes like Banjara and Adi Karnataka. Kannada Brahmins are divided into several communities. Although historically Jainism in Karnataka had dominant presence, Kannada Jains today form a small minority.

=== Horanadu Kannadigaru ===
Horanadu Kannadigas (or non-resident Kannadigas) are Kannadigas who have migrated to another state or country, people of Kannada origin born outside Karnataka, or people of Kannada origin who reside permanently outside of Karnataka. N R Narayana Murthy, speaking at the 2011 World Kannada Conference, opined that Kannadigas who move out of the state are respected everywhere. Although the failure in political arena has reflected in the cultural isolation of emigrants, some of the successful functional bodies include Singara (Singapore), Dehali Kannadiga (New Delhi), Mumbai Karnataka Sangha (Mumbai), Mallige Kannada Balaga (Mauritius), North America Vishwa Kannada Association (NAVIKA) and Association of Kannada Kootas of America (AKKA) in the United States have promoted cultural involvement through events such as Kannadotsava. Significant Kannada minorities are found in the Indian states of Maharashtra in Kolhapur, Solapur and Sangli; Tamil Nadu in Nilgiri, Erode, Dharampuri and Hosur; Andhra Pradesh in Madakasira, Rayadurgam, Anantapur, Chitoor and Kurnool; Goa; Kerala in Waynad; and in other Indian states. The Kannadiga diaspora are found all over the world, in countries like the USA, the United Kingdom, Canada, and in the UAE.

== See also ==
- Kannada film industry
- Kannada language
- Kannada literature
- Kannada poetry
- Karnataka
- Karnataka literature
- List of people from Bangalore
- List of people from Karnataka
- List of people of North Karnataka
- North Karnataka
- Sanganakallu
- Siribhoovalaya - a unique literary work
- The Karnataka Socio-Economic and Education Survey 2015
