= Kasuti =

Traditional form of folk embroidery from Karnataka, India

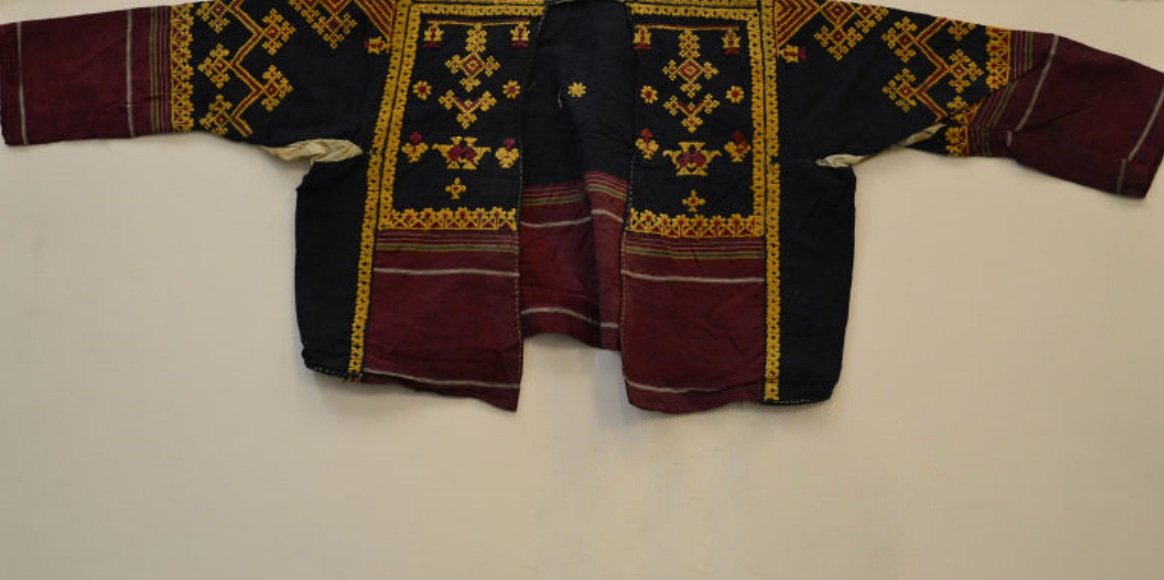
Kasuti embroidery work on Ravike ca. 1855–1879.

Kasuti is a traditional form of folk embroidery practised in the state of Karnataka, India. Kasuti work which is very intricate sometimes involves putting up to 5,000 stitches by hand and is traditionally made on dresswear like Ilkal sarees, Ravike/Kuppasa (Khana) and Angi. The Karnataka Handicrafts Development Corporation (KHDC) holds a geographical indications (GI) protection for Kasuti embroidery which provides intellectual property rights on Kasuti to KHDC.

== History ==
The history of Kasuti dates back to the Chalukya period. The name Kasuti is derived from the words Kai (meaning hand) and Suti/suttu (meaning wrap/weave), indicating an activity that is done using cotton and hands. The women courtiers in the Mysore Kingdom in the 17th century were expected to be adept in 64 arts, with Kasuti being one of them. The Kasuti embroidery features folk designs influenced by rangoli patterns of Karnataka. In Karnataka Sarees embroidered with Kasuti were expected to be a part of the bridal trousseau of which one saree made of black silk with Kasuti embroidery called Chandrakali saree was of premier importance.

== Kasuti work ==
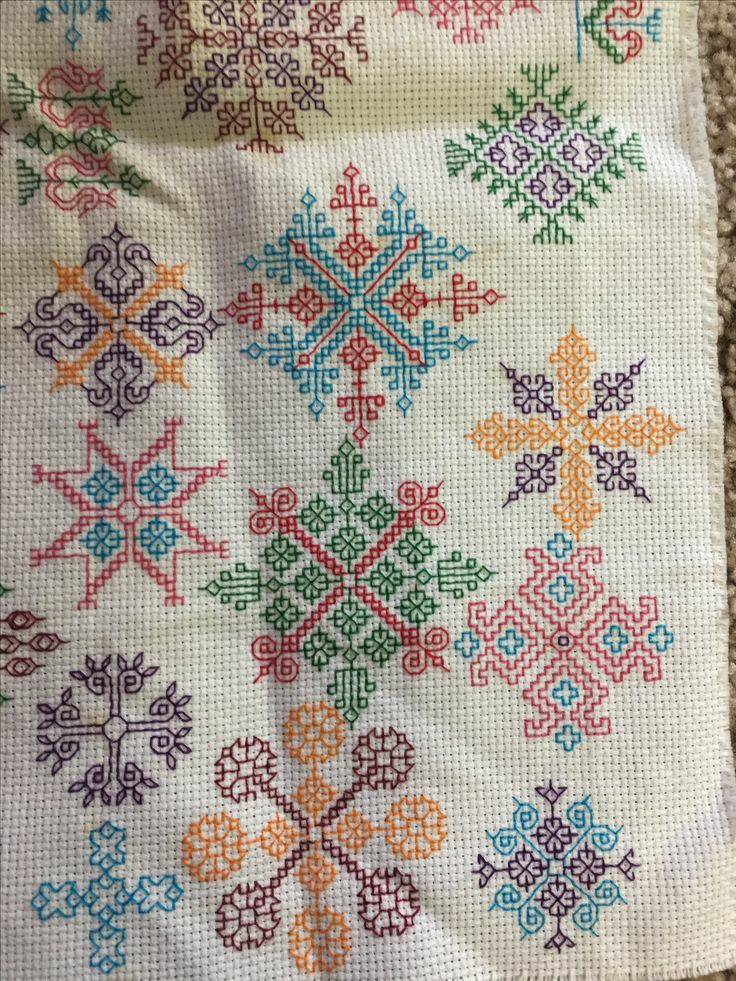
Motifs of kasuti embroidery

Kasuti work involves embroidering very intricate patterns like gopura, chariot, palanquin, lamps and conch shells. Locally available materials are used for Kasuti. The work is laborious and involves counting of each thread on the cloth. The patterns are stitched without using knots to ensure that both sides of the cloth look alike. Different varieties of stitches are employed to obtain the desired pattern. Four types of the stitches employed are Gavanthi, Murgi, Negi and Menthi. Gavanthi is a double running stitch used for marking vertical, horizontal and diagonal lines, Murgi is a zig-zag stitch, Negi is a running stitch and Menthi is a cross stitch resembling fenugreek seeds.

== Modern Times ==
Kasuti work has grown beyond its traditional boundaries to be used in other dress materials like the Mysore silk saree. A Kasuti centre was set up in Hubli, Karnataka by the Department of Social Welfare, Government of Karnataka to encourage the Kasuti culture and also provide a single roof for the rural women to showcase their craft. However Kasuti work is suffering from poor patronage with not many people willing to take the craft seriously; an indication of which is the closure of the Karnataka Kasuti classes by the JSS college in Dharwad.

Kasuti embroidery work on silk depicting ratha

== See also ==
- Bidriware
- Channapatna toys
- Ilkal saree
- Molakalmuru Sari
- Navalgund Durries
