= Association of Kannada Kootas of America =

Kannada cultural organization in North America

- ಅಮೇರಿಕಾ ಕನ್ನಡ ಕೂಟಗಳ ಆಗರ
- Abbreviation: AKKA
- Formation: February 1998; 28 years ago
- Type: Nonprofit cultural organization
- Region served: United States and Canada
- Official language: Kannada and English
- Website: akkaonline.org

The Association of Kannada Kootas of America (AKKA) (Kannada: ಅಮೇರಿಕಾ ಕನ್ನಡ ಕೂಟಗಳ ಆಗರ (ಅಕ್ಕ) ) is a North American nonprofit cultural organization representing regional associations of Kannadigas, commonly known as Kannada Kootas. It was established in February 1998 following a Kannada conference in Phoenix, Arizona, with the stated purpose of coordinating Kannada organizations in the United States and Canada and promoting the Kannada language and the culture of Karnataka.

AKKA organizes the World Kannada Conference, a recurring gathering featuring cultural performances, literary programmes, exhibitions, professional forums, youth activities and appearances by artists and public figures from Karnataka. The organization has also undertaken educational, charitable and community-service activities in Karnataka and North America.

== History ==
AKKA was formed following the World Kannada Sammelana held in Phoenix from 13 to 15 February 1998. According to the preamble to its constitution, participants resolved to establish a central organization that would integrate and coordinate Kannada associations and Kannadigas in North America. The Virginia General Assembly later described AKKA as having been founded at the 1998 Phoenix conference by members of the Kannada community who believed that a central organization was needed in North America.

The first World Kannada Conference organized under the AKKA name was held in Houston, Texas, in 2000. Contemporary reporting on the 2002 conference in Detroit described AKKA as the umbrella organization conducting the event and reported that approximately 4,000 delegates were expected. Its programme included folk and classical dance, Yakshagana, literary activities, exhibitions, a women's forum and business seminars.

In 2001, the Government of Karnataka conferred a Karnataka Rajyotsava Award on “America Kannada Kootagala Agara (AKKA)” in the association and organization category.

In 2009, AKKA opened an office in Bengaluru and established an India coordination committee. The organization stated that the office would support its cultural and charitable work and assist coordination with organizations in Karnataka.

Also in 2009, seven founding members and other members separated from AKKA and established the North America Vishwa Kannada Association. The Times of India reported that the division followed disagreements among members of AKKA's executive committee.

== World Kannada Conference ==
The World Kannada Conference is AKKA's principal recurring public event. It is generally conducted in cooperation with regional Kannada organizations and includes cultural, literary, educational, professional and social programmes. AKKA's official conference archive lists twelve conferences between 2000 and 2024.

AKKA World Kannada Conferences
No.	Year	Location	Host or participating Kannada Koota	AKKA president	Conference convenor(s)	Notable guests or participants	Sources
1st	2000	Houston, Texas	Kannada Vrinda, Houston	Amarnath Gowda	—	U. R. Ananthamurthy; Girish Karnad	
2nd	2002	Detroit, Michigan	Pampa Kannada Koota, Detroit	Amarnath Gowda	—		
3rd	2004	Orlando, Florida	Sri Gandha Kannada Koota,	Amarnath Gowda	Dr. Renuka Ramappa	—	
4th	2006	Baltimore, Maryland	Kaveri Kannada Association (MD, DC, VA)	Dr. Kudur Murali	Ravi Dankanikote Suresh Ramachandra	Dy CM of Karnataka Sri. B. S. Yediyurappa Dharmasthala Veerendra Heggade Ravi Shankar HH Shivaratri Deshikendra Swamiji	
5th	2008	Chicago, Illinois	Vidyaranya Kannada Koota, Chicago	Ramesh Gowda	Mokshagundam Jayaram Shivamurthy Keelara Vasanthi Gowda	Bharatanatyam performers from SOS Children's Village, Bengaluru Chief Minister of Karnataka: B. S. Yediyurappa	
6th	2010	Edison, New Jersey	Brindavana Kannada Koota, NJ	Ravi Dankanikote	Prasanna Madhu Rangaiah Shankar Shetty		
7th	2012	Atlanta, Georgia	Nrupathunga Kannada Koota, Atlanta	Dayashankar Adappa	Ramaswamy Srinivas Srivijay	Smt. Sudha Murthy	
8th	2014	San Jose, California	Kannada Koota of Northern California	Dr. Halekote Vishwamitra	Suresh Babu Raghu Halur Ravishankar Byrappagowda	—	
9th	2016	Atlantic City, New Jersey	—	Raj Patil	Sharath Bhandary	—	
10th	2018	Dallas, Texas	Mallige Kannada Association of North Texas	Shivamurthy Keelara	Srivatsa Ramanathan Anuradha Tavarekere	—	
11th	2020	Online	—	Tumkur Dayananda	—	—	
12th	2024	Richmond, Virginia	Richmond Kannada Sangha and Kaveri Kannada Association (MD, DC, VA)	Ravi Boregowda	Naveen Krishna Haridas T. Lahari Shanmugan Iyer	---	
13th	2026	Philadelphia, PA	---	Madhu Rangaiah			

== Programs and activities ==
=== Cultural and literary activities ===
AKKA and its affiliated organizations conduct programmes involving Kannada music, dance, theatre, literature and folk traditions. The programme of the 2002 conference included Dollu Kunitha, Yakshagana, classical and fusion dance, poetry, essays, Kannada reading, religious seminars, arts exhibitions and public performances.

The conferences also provide opportunities for performers and students based in India and North America. In 2008, two engineering students from SOS Children's Village in Bengaluru were selected to receive recognition for Bharatanatyam performances at the AKKA conference in Chicago.

=== Community initiatives ===
In 2003, AKKA announced plans for a counselling and referral network for Kannada-speaking women in the United States experiencing domestic abuse, marital difficulties or social isolation. The proposed network was to involve Kannada Kootas as well as legal, psychological and nonprofit professionals.

=== Business and professional programmes ===
Business forums and professional networking have formed part of AKKA's conferences. The 2002 Detroit programme included business seminars and commercial exhibitions alongside cultural and literary activities.

== Charitable activities ==
AKKA states that its charitable activities have included providing books, clothing and school materials to children in Karnataka, assisting primary schools with building improvements, contributing to disaster-relief efforts and supporting health-related projects.

In 2009, The Times of India reported that AKKA was working with the Sankara Eye Foundation on eye-hospital projects in Karnataka. The organization also announced a blood-donation drive in the United States for Karnataka Rajyotsava Day.

== Organization and governance ==
AKKA is structured as an association of regional Kannada Kootas in the United States and Canada. Its constitution provides for an executive committee, a board of trustees and representation from affiliated organizations. The affiliated associations retain responsibility for their regional cultural, educational and social programmes.

== Recognition ==
The Government of Karnataka conferred a Karnataka Rajyotsava Award on AKKA in 2001 in the association and organization category.

== See also ==
- Kannada people
- Kannada language
- Karnataka
- Indian Americans
- Indian Canadians
- North America Vishwa Kannada Association
