= Ilkal =

- Taluk/City
- Nickname: Stone city. Pink Granite city
- Location in Karnataka, India
- Coordinates: 15.97°N 76.13°E
- Country: India
- State: Karnataka
- District: Bagalkot

Government
  - Type: CMC
  - Body: City Municipality council CMC

Area
  - Total: 35 km^{2} (14 sq mi)
  - Rank: 2nd city in Bagalkot
- Elevation: 585 m (1,919 ft)

Population (2024)
  - Total: 120,000 (approx)
  - Density: 3,400/km^{2} (8,900/sq mi)

Languages
  - Official: Kannada
- Time zone: UTC+5:30 (IST)
- PIN -->: 587125.587154
- Vehicle registration: KA-29
- Website: ilkalcity.mrc.gov.in

Ilkal is a City in Bagalkot district in the Indian state of Karnataka. The town is located in a valley that lies in south-east corner of Bagalkot district and is quite close to the borders of Kushtagi taluk of the Koppal district. Now Ilkal city becomes taluk previous the city falls within the jurisdiction of Hungund taluk and lies at a distance of about 12 km (7.5 mi) south of taluk headquarters. Between these two towns, Ilkal is an important centre of trade, commerce, education, and industry. Ilkal is well connected with state and national highways. It is also famous for its hospitality and education institutions.

== Ilkal saree ==
Ilkal is famous for hand-loomed sarees, popularly known as Ilkal sarees. These sarees are worn in the North Karnataka, Andhra Pradesh and Maharashtra states. Ilkal sarees have a distinctive pattern and are usually made from cotton. They are best suited for weather conditions prevailing in the region. Recently, sarees made in Ilkal are worn by high society ladies as a fashion statement. There are many wide variety of sarees are made here with variable cotton and silk ratios.

== Geography ==
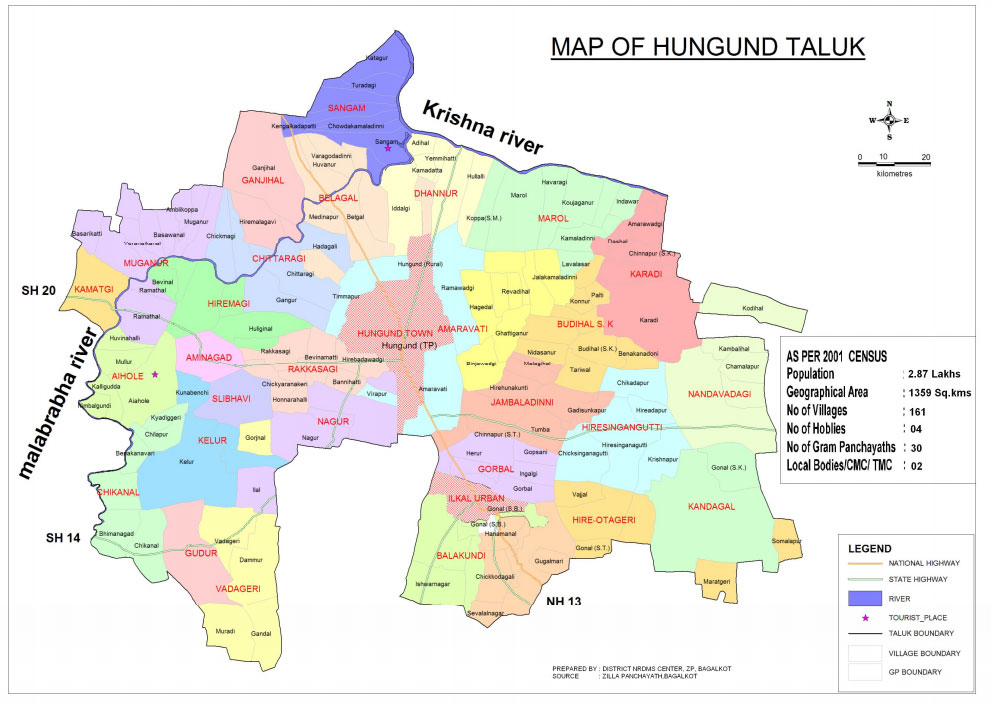
Hungund Taluk before creation of Ilkal Taluk

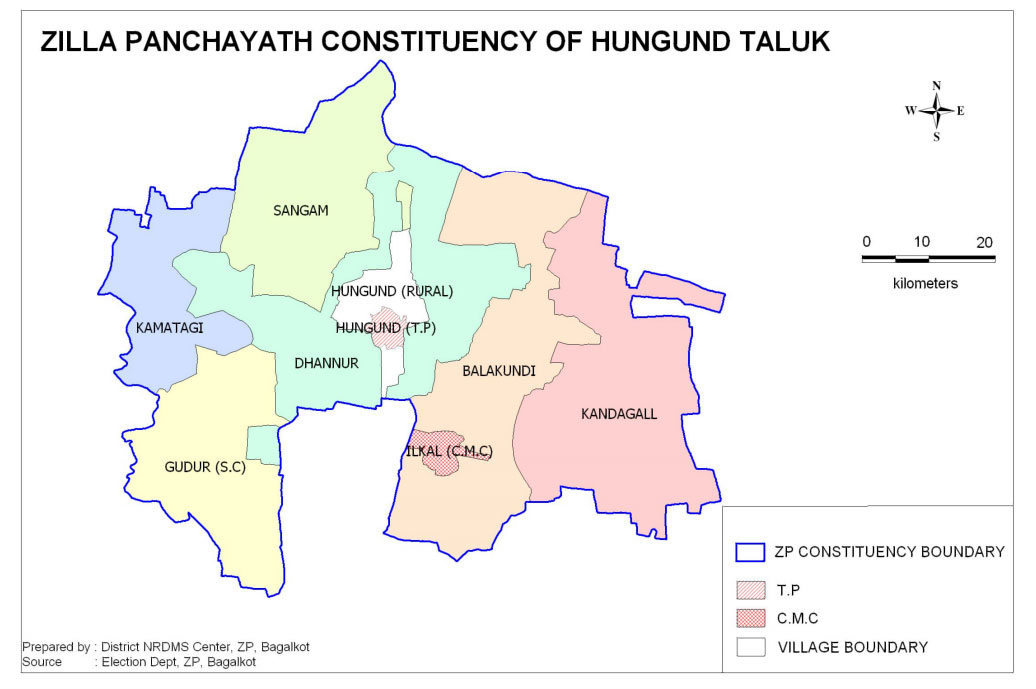
Hungund Taluk ZP Constituency Map before creation of Ilkal Taluk

It has an average elevation of 585 m. Ilkal is famous for pink granite (ruby red), which is exported all over the world. The town is surrounded by the levelled surface and small hills in certain directions which has an abundant resource of the granite stones. The majority of the soil found here is the rich, fertile black soil with a semi-arid region type.

== Demographics ==
As of the 2001 Indian census, Ilkal had a population of 51,956. Males constituted 51% of the population and females 49%. Ilkal had an average literacy rate of 62%, higher than the national average of 59.5%: male literacy was 72%, and female literacy was 52%. In Ilkal, 14% of the population was under 6 years of age. Most people in the place have the occupation of weaving Ilkal sarees, known for its traditional and cultural value. The people of this occupation are mostly the Devangas and other OBC sectors. The caste diversity mostly includes that of the sects like Lingayats, Marwadis, Kshatriya[Savaji] and Devangas among Hindus. Muslims and Jains also constitute a major part and the Christians a minor part of the population.

== Culture ==
Shri Vijay Mahantesh—A saint (ajja), who followed the foot prints of lord Basava and showed the way of living life with peace and harmony. It is believed that, he never disappoints his devotees. A temple (math or gaduge) is built in his name, by the devotees. Every year in the month of September (Shravan masa—Hindu calendar), i.e. last Monday of that month a fair is held, where a chariot decorated with flowers is being pulled by the devotees or followers of the math. A possession will be held in the evening in which a well decorated palanquin is taken around the town.

== Industry ==
The main source of income is the granite business and weaving is a widespread occupation. The agricultural land is not arable, and it faces the threat of pollution because of the granite activities involved and water shortage. Hence, the agriculture provides a very little employment opportunity to the locals. Jowar, Sunflower are the major crops grown here, and the agriculture is rain dependent.

As stated above, Ilkal is also famous for Ilkal sarees, which are a specific designed border. These will be dazzlingly authentic, to wear in any functions. The Ilkal pure silk saree costs anywhere between Rs.4000 and 12000, whereas an Ilkal chamka (alternate thread of cotton and silk) saree costs somewhere between 600 and 2000. Most of the handloom weaving culture is replaced by the powerloom weaving styles and the industry is gradually dwindling because of competitions, lack of creative skills and innovations and lack of support. The main competitor for the industry is Gajendragad.

The granite brings in a lot of revenue and the business is well established. The quarries and mines nearby are excavated for the raw stone, processed and polished and marketed. It is an important export commodity from the place and the town has welcomed an immense urbanization from the states as far as Rajasthan and Orissa. Nearby villages like Hoolageri have been widely benefitted and influenced and it is a main form of employment for the people of the regions. Important products include ruby red and Ilkal chocolate.

== See also ==
- Ilkal saree
