= Bagalbandi =

Type of garment

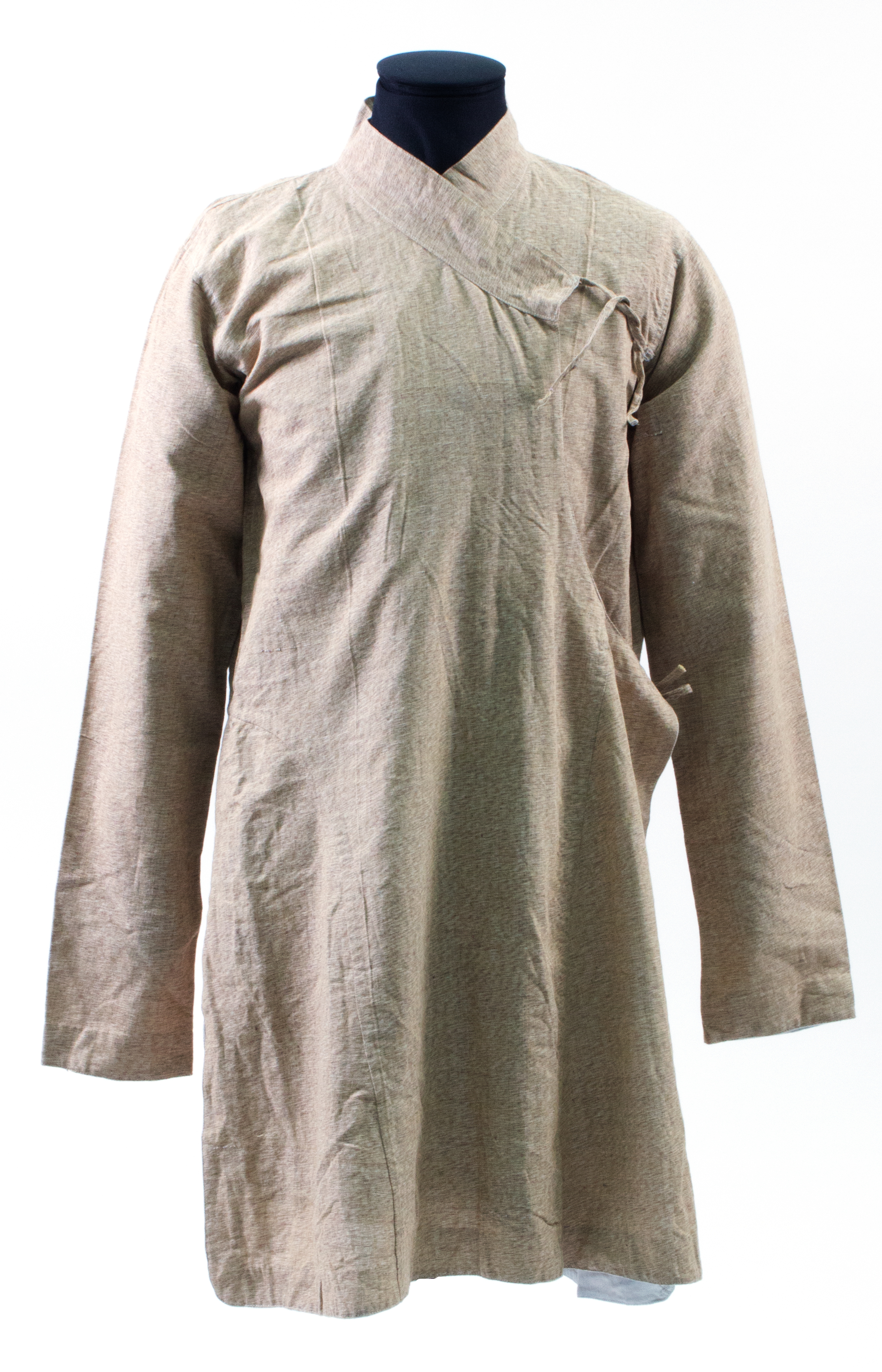
Bagalbandi shown here with tied-flaps, Bagalbandi term literally translates to "tied on the side".

Bagalbandi or Barabandhi or Daura is a male upper garment; it is a typical shirt that ties on the side. It is similar to a waistcoat in style. It has a wide section in the front that overlaps the other side, similar to a double-breasted coat with strings attached to fasten the garment. Bagalbandi is an ethnic costume of the Indian subcontinent; the garment is more associated with Hindi belt, Gujarat, Maharastra, Nepal, along with other regions.

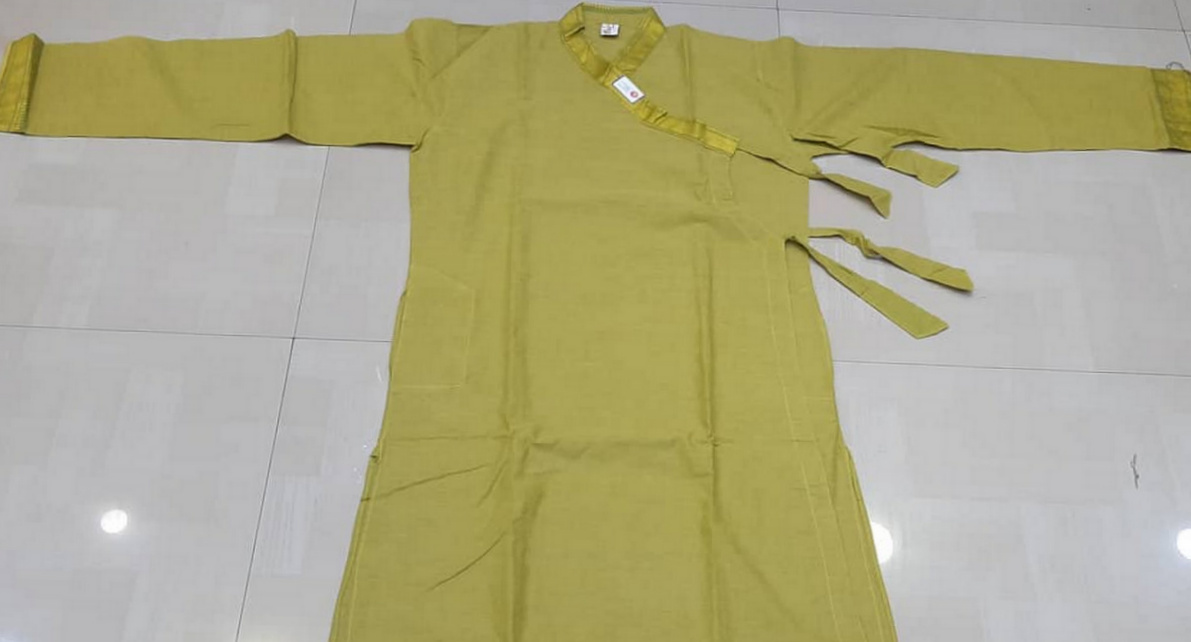
an untied Bagalbandhi

== Etymology ==
Bagalbandi (Hindi: बगलबंदी, Bagalbandi, Marathi: बाराबंदी, Barabandi, Nepali: दौरा, Daura, Bengali: পার্শ্ব বন্ধ, Parshwo Bondho) is a combined colloquial word, Bagal suggests 'side of the body' and bandhi or bandi implies to bands or 'to tie.'

== Regional styles ==
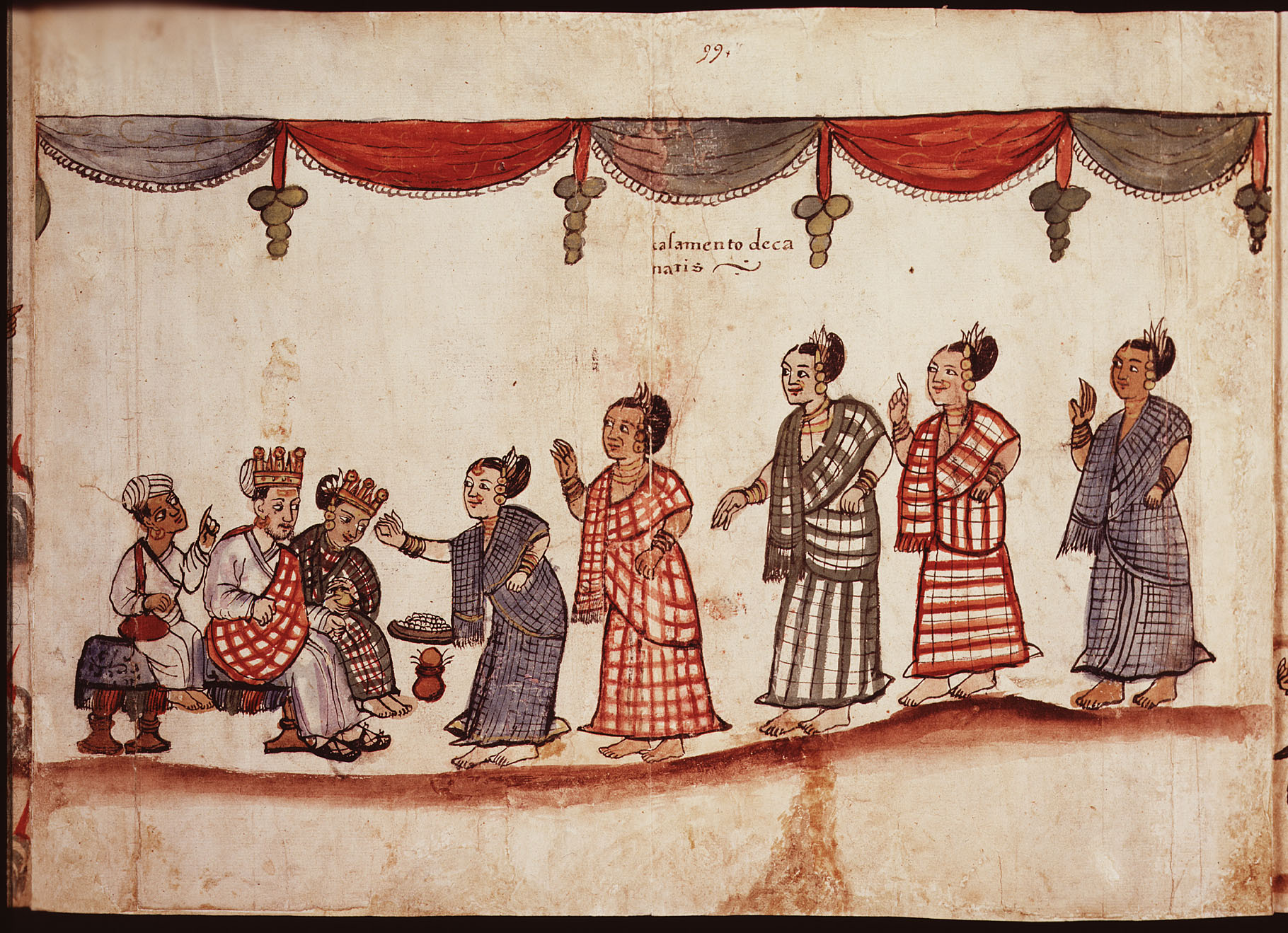
16th century depiction of a Kannada wedding ceremony in the Códice Casanatense. The Kannada men are shown wearing an Angi.

In Hindi belt, Rajasthan and Gujarat it is worn with dhoti, turban and forms part of traditional male costume in the region. In Hindi belt apart from dhoti, it is also worn with tight fitted trousers called churidar or salwar. Like most common traditional dresses with minor alterations it has also become a popular style among females today.

It is known as "Barabandhi" in Maharashtra and surrounding regions. The word "Bara" means "12" in Marathi language and "Bandi" means "tie", it has 12 nods, 6 in the inner side and 6 outer side. In Karnataka, Andhra Pradesh and Telangana an older term Angi is also used for this clothing, varying 4 to 12 nods.

In Nepal, Sikkim and Darjeeling regions it is known as "Daura" It is worn with suruwal, a term also used in Gujarat for tight fitted trousers.

Bagalbandi is also a clothing style characterized in Eastern and Northeast regions, notably in Bengal, Odisha, Assam and Manipur

== See also ==
- Daura-Suruwal
