= Daura-Suruwal =

National outfit of Nepalese men

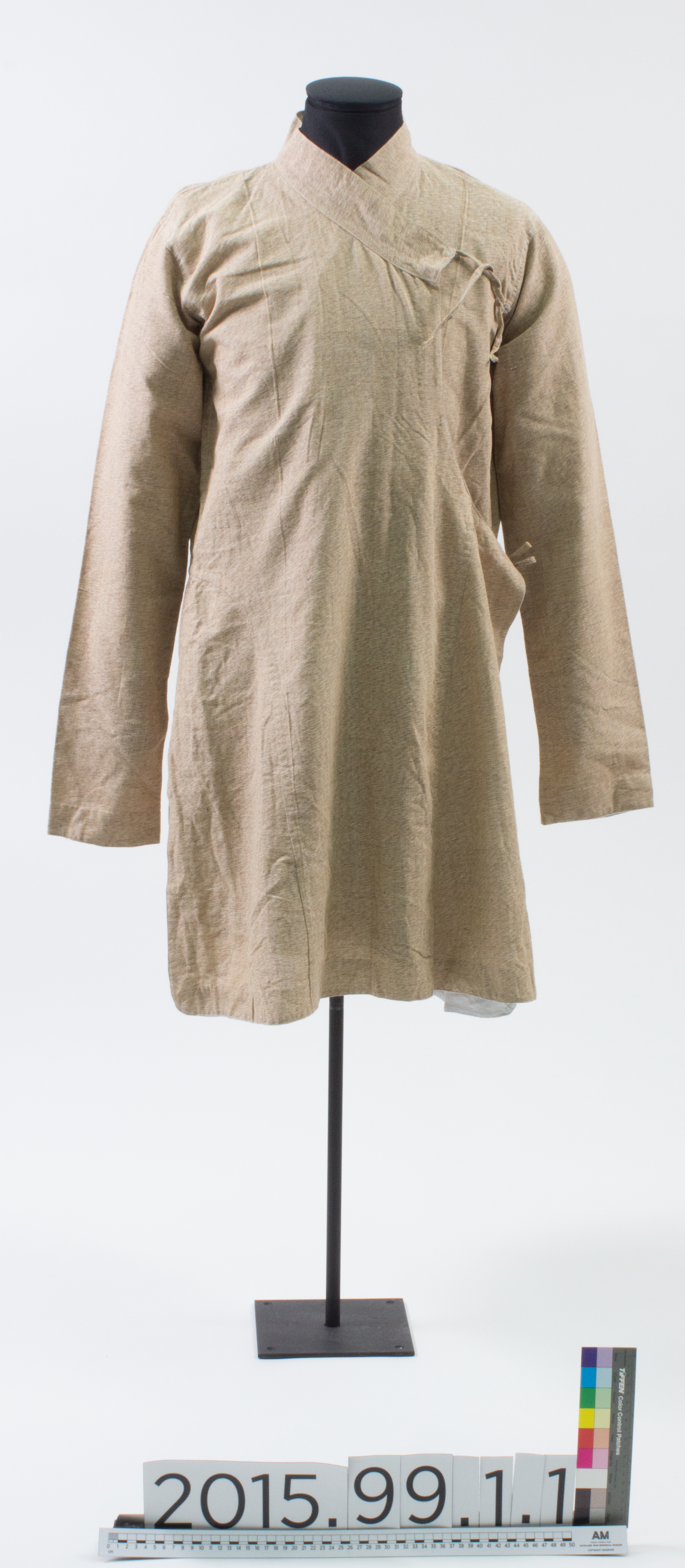
The Daura-Suruwal, the national dress of Nepal

Daura-Suruwal (Nepali: दौरा सुरुवाल) is one of the national outfit of Nepalese men. The Daura is a variant of the Kurta and is the upper garment, the Suruwal is the trouser. The coat was added to the costume by Jang Bahadur Rana, a prime minister of Nepal in the 19th century. The outfit is also popular in Darjeeling in neighbouring India amongst people of Nepalese descent.

== Origin ==
The exact origin of Daura-Suruwal is often debated but many historians believe that the clothing migrated east from the Hindu Kush via Tajikistan, Afghanistan and Kashmir before establishing in Nepal.

== Style ==
In Nepal, the traditional male dress, which is also the national dress, is the Nepali shirt called daura and suruwal (Nepali: दौरा सुरूवाल) or daura-suruwal suit. According to Hussein (2018), "the daura is a closed-neck shirt with five pleats and eight strings that serve to tie it around the body".

The upper garment is similar to the Gujarati kediyu, but does not have the pleats going across the chest, but has cross-tied flaps.

The Nepali suruwa/suruwal is a combination of the churidar and the lower garment worn in the coastal regions of Gujarat, especially Saurashtra and Kutch where the garment is also called suruwal (and chorno/kafni). It is tight along the legs but wide at the hips. However, the suruwal fits comfortably around the legs so that it can be tapered tightly around the ankles.

The Nepalese Prime Minister Bir Shamsher Jang Bahadur Rana wore the Daura-Suruwal on an unofficial visit to the United Kingdom in the 19th century, which popularised the costume further in Nepal. Janga Bahadur Rana introduced the coat to Nepal in the 19th century. He was presented a coat by the then Queen of the United Kingdom, as a gift. He started the tradition of wearing a coat with the Daura suruwal. Men also wear the Daura Suruwal with a waistcoat.

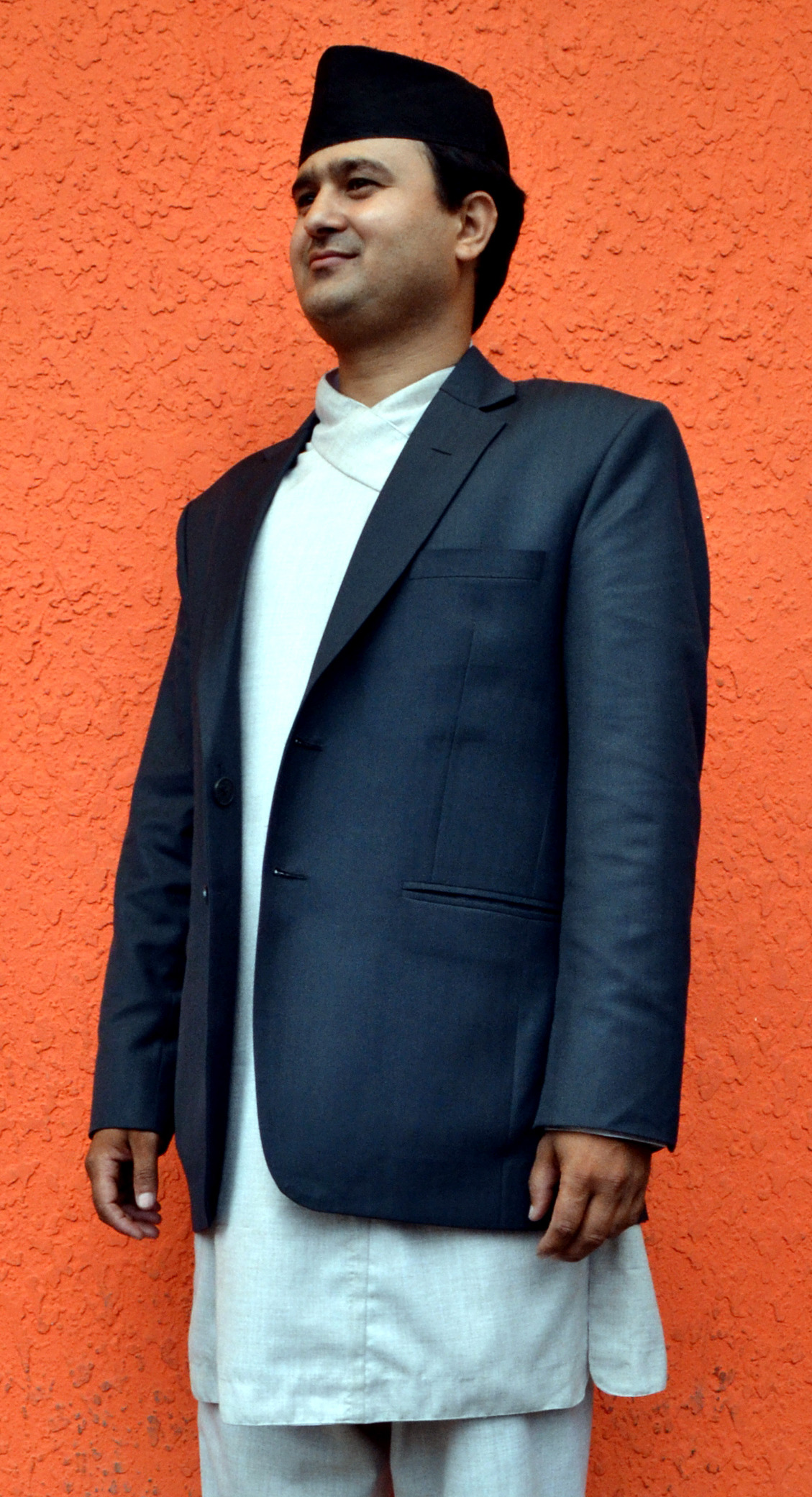
Daura suruwal, Nepal's national male dress.

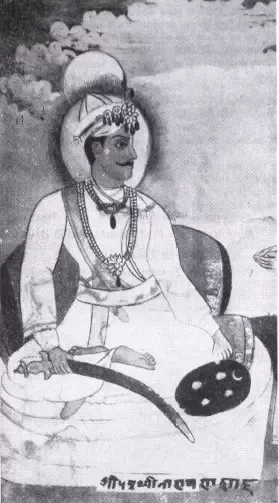
Prithvi Narayan Shah of Nepal in daura shalwar.

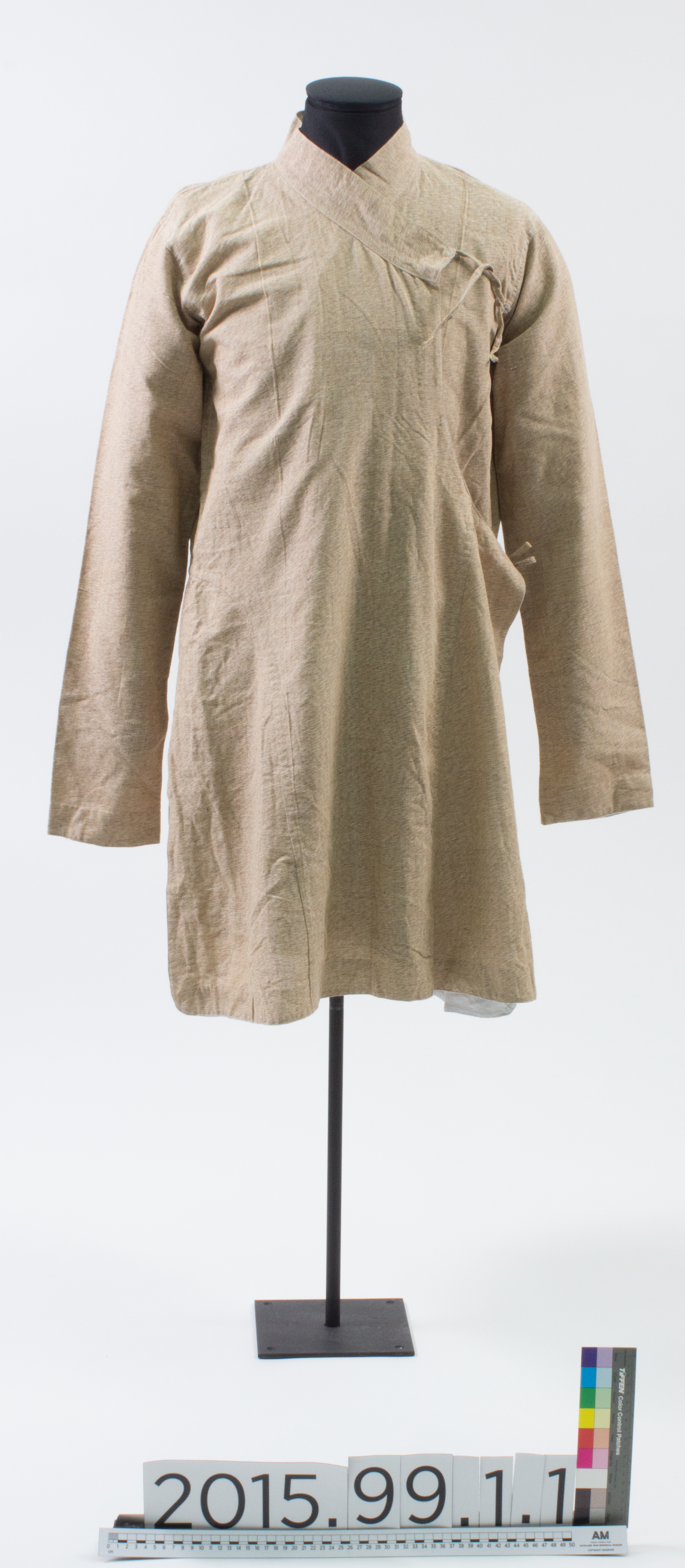

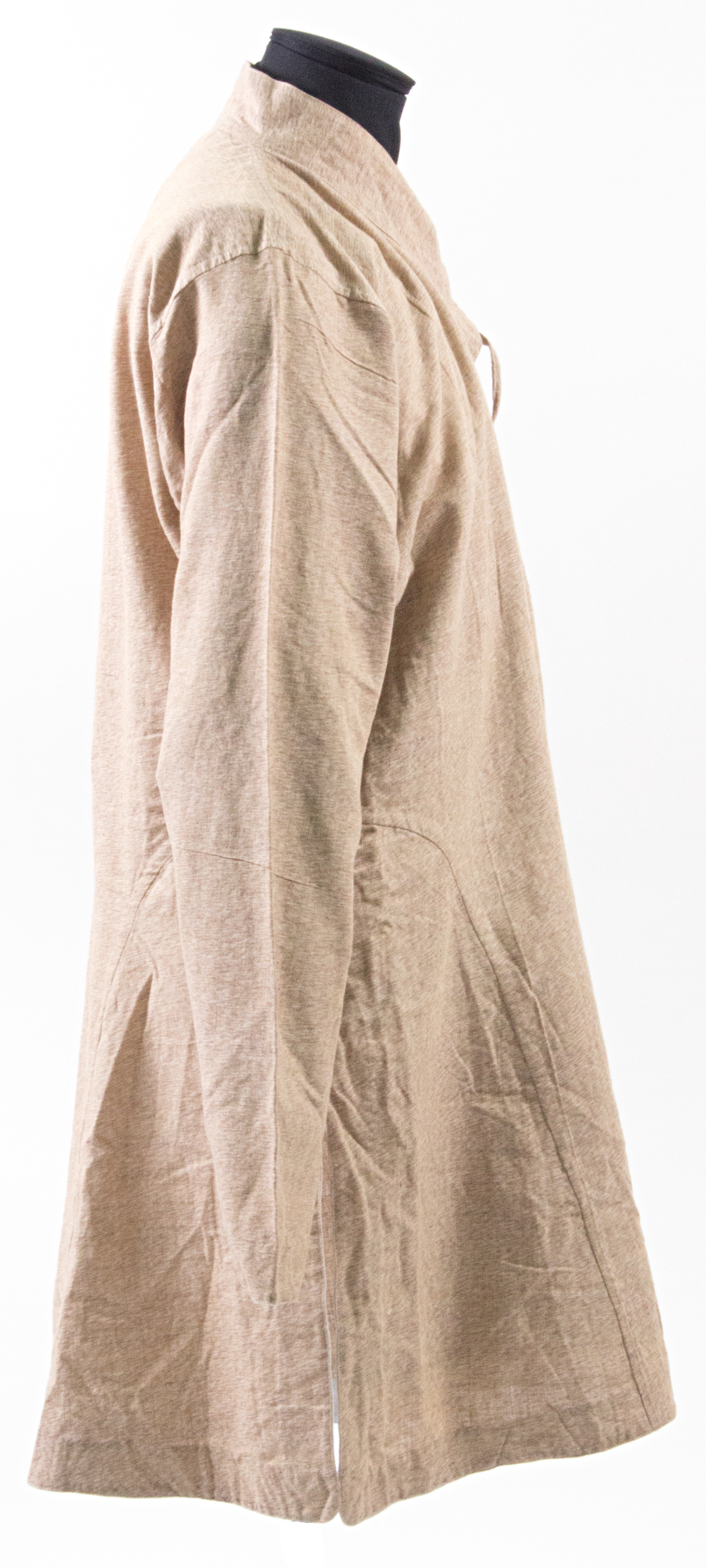

== Religious beliefs ==
The Daura has eight strings used to tie the Daura which are denoted as Astamatrika-Singini:

- Byagini
- Kumari
- Barahi
- Brahmayani
- Indrayani
- Maheshowri
- Byasnabi
- Mahalaxmi

According to Nepali mythology, eight is a lucky number. The pleats or Kallis signify the Pancha Buddha or Pancha Ratna. The closed neck of the Daura signifies the snake around the Lord Shiva's neck.

== See also ==
- Bagalbandi
