= Navalgund durrie =

Type of durrie

Navalgund durries
- Geographical indication
- Type: Rugs and carpets
- Area: Navalgund, Dharwad district
- Country: India
- Registered: 27 June 2011
- Material: Cotton

Navalgund durries, geographically tagged in India, are woven durries or a type of Indian rug with geometric designs, birds, and animal designs from Navalgund in Dharwad district of Karnataka, India

This durrie has been registered for protection under the Geographical indication of the Trade Related Intellectual Property Rights (TRIPS) agreement. In 2011, it was listed as "Navalgund Durries" under the GI Act 1999 of the Government of India with registration confirmed by the Controller General of Patents Designs and Trademarks under Class 27 vide application number 61 of 27 June 2011. The logo for this durrie was registered under application number 512, dated 8 January 2015.

== Location ==
Navalgund, where the hand-made Navalgund durries are made, is located within the geographical coordinates of 15°34′12″N 75°22′12″E.

== History ==
Nuvulgund durrigullu, also known as "jumkhaanaa" gullu in Kannada language, were initially made by a group of weavers of Bijapur who used to live in the Jumkhaan Gulli during the reign of Ali Adil Shah. As a result of the war between the Adil Shahs and the Vijayanagar Empire, the Jumkhaan weavers sought a safe place to pursue their trade, and so migrated to Nuvulgund, initially to trade in pearls but later settled down in the town, established looms and wove durrigullu.

These durrigullu are made exclusively by the women of the community, operating the looms at home. At one time, there were 75 women working on this handicraft, but due to lack of facilities and poor returns, now only some 35 women are engaged in the weaving of the rugs. Traditional Muslim women of the Sheikh Sayeed community were confined to their homes, and hence this craft became their exclusive culture and a means at home to make a living. This type of durrie is not made at any other place. The artisans are quite secretive about their art of weaving these durries, and the skill is taught only to their daughters–in-law (not to their daughters as after marriage they would go away to another family).

== Manufacturing details ==
With the legacy of several generations of manufacturing the Navalgund durries, their specifications and procedure of manufacture are well documented.

In the process of manufacture the raw cotton is procured by the weavers from the Karnataka State Handicrafts Development Corporation. Cotton 3/10s, an unbleached yarn, is used for the warp and cotton 10s of 6-ply is used for weft. The yarns could also be purchased from the market in Hubli. After procurement of the required material, pre-weaving process is started. This is a four-stage process. The first step being preparation of warp, which is a set of threads which runs through the length of the durries and which is covered by the weft. The decision on the length of the durrie is dictated by the 3/10s cotton converted into balls. While warp of the small durries are made in the open yard of the house, in the case of larger size durries of say 8 by 12 feet (2.4 m × 3.7 m) size, the warps are made in large open grounds in the town. Then a detailed work procedure is followed with sticks to warp the required number of threads. This warp is then shifted to the loom inside the house and weaving is done in a set pattern using warp beams of the looms, sticks and threads. The yarn of the weft 10s cotton is then dyed with dyes of black, yellow, red, brown, blue and green colours, mixed with water, and the hanks are kept in the dye solution for 20 minutes before removal and drying. The warp is fixed on the loom (which is of vertical design, quite ancient, unlike the horizontal loom used at the ground level at other places in the country) and adequately stretched to obtain the required tension. The weaving is then started by two weavers facing each other. Patterns are introduced in the warp at the appropriate stage of weaving. Vertical and diagonal lines are marked and weaved suitably. Weft is then covered over the warp, and this covering decides the quality of the durries. Weft is layered over the warp and pressed properly by beating and tamping. The cloth beam is used to wind the cloth as the durrie gets made. The designs are decided by the weavers intuitively. The progress achieved on each loom is about 6 inches (15 cm) per day.

Following completion of the weaving process, the durries are removed from the loom, and the over-hanging threads are all trimmed. Tassels, in the form of knots, are made at the end of the warps. The decorative threads of white and other colours are threaded to the edges. A particular feature of these durries is that no two durries are alike in colour and size.

These durries are marketed under three categories as: Jamkhana in sizes of 3 by 5 feet (0.91 m × 1.52 m), 9 ft × 6 ft (2.7 m × 1.8 m), and 6 ft x 9 ft; Navagund-ja-Namaz of 2 ft × 4 ft (0.61 m × 1.22 m), which is a prayer mat which is exclusively used by the Muslim community and *which they carry with them) for offering worship in the mosque or at any other place; and Guddar of 18 ft × 9 ft (5.5 m × 2.7 m) used as a floor covering and for storing grains; this type is not manufactured by the Navalgund weavers but by a different set of weavers.

Inspection of the durries is carried out by a body of officials from the Development Commissioner (Handicrafts), Director (Market Research) of the Textile Committee of the Ministry of Textiles, and a leading Master Artisan representing the Producer Associations.

== See also ==
- Bidriware
- Dharwad pedha
- Ilkal saree
- Molakalmuru sari
