= North America Vishwa Kannada Association =

- Founded: March 26, 2009
- Type: Non profit organization
- Location: Florida, United States
- Origins: Broke away from AKKA
- Region served: North America
- Website: navika.org

North America Vishwa Kannada Association (Kannada: ನಾರ್ತ್ ಅಮೆರಿಕ ವಿಶ್ವ ಕನ್ನಡ ಅಗರ, commonly referred to as NAVIKA) is an association of Kannadigas located in North America. It is a not for profit organization registered in Florida. In March 2009, on the day of Ugadi (Kannada New Year), NAVIKA was formed as some members of the Association of Kannada Kootas of America (AKKA) broke ties with AKKA due to differences of opinion.

== History ==
The history of NAVIKA lies in the other prominent Kannadiga association in the United States, the Association of Kannada Kootas of America (AKKA). On 26 March 2011 (Kannada New Year's Day), seven founding members of AKKA along with 25 others split from AKKA and formed NAVIKA. It aims to unite Kannadigas across the world and provide a forum to address issues faced by them.

== World Kannada Summit 2010 ==
In July 2010, NAVIKA conducted the World Kannada Summit 2010 in Pasadena, California. Former Chief Minister of Karnataka B. S. Yeddyurappa was invited to inaugurate the event. Kannada actor Shivarajkumar, along with actresses Jennifer Kotwal and Sharmila Mandre, also participated in the event. Actor Ganesh cancelled his participation in the conference citing professional reasons, though it is believed that the cancellation was because he was not impressed with the facilities provided by the Karnataka government.

The Government of Karnataka sent a 48-member delegation to participate in the conference. Critics of this move opined that the government should not have spent public money in sending a delegation arbitrarily selected by the government without a proper selection process.
