= Molakalmuru sari =

Silk Sari

Molakalmuru Saree, also known as Karnataka Kanchipuram, is the traditional silk saree that is woven in Molakalmuru, Chitradurga district, Karnataka, India. In 2011, it was granted a Geographical Indication tag and its tag number is 53. The motifs include that of fruits, animals, and flowers.

== See also ==
- Byadagi chilli
- Coorg orange
- Ilkal saree
- Mysore Sandalwood Oil
- Navalgund durries
