= Karnataka State Handicrafts Development Corporation =

Agency of the Karnataka state government

Karnataka State Handicrafts Development Corporation is an agency of Government of Karnataka established in 1964. It is formed to develop, preserve and promote the rich tradition of exquisite craftsmanship of Karnataka state. It supports more than 50,000 artisans directly or indirectly.

In February 2025, KSHDC paid a special dividend of Rs.6 crore to the state government.
