= Sri Shilpi Siddanthi Siddalinga Swami =

Indian artist, guru, writer (1885–1952)

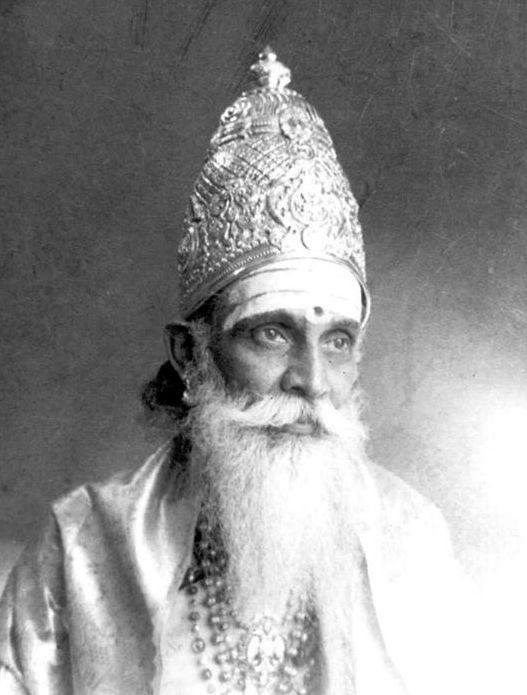
- Sri Shilpi Siddanthi Siddalinga Swami
- Born: 20 November 1885; Kollegal, Mysore State
- Died: 11 July 1952 (aged 66); Mysore, Mysore State
- Occupations: Archutect, ascetic, painter, sculptor, and writer

Sri Shilpi Siddanthi Siddalinga Swami (Kannada, ಶ್ರೀ ಶಿಲ್ಪಿ ಸಿದ್ದನ್ತಿ ಸಿದ್ದಲಿಂಗ ಸ್ವಾಮಿ; 20 November 1885 – 11 July 1952) was a royal guru of Mysore State and personal guru of Maharaja Jayachamarajendra Wadiyar of Mysore. He was also a prominent painter, sculptor, architect and writer, known for his contribution to Mysore painting and architecture.

== Early life ==
Sri Siddalinga Swami was born to Siddappaji and mother Mallajamma, a veerashaiva jangam family, near Kollegal in 1885. Since childhood, he was well versed in his family traits.

== Career ==
Around 1908, he had an opportunity to work in Mysore under Maharaja Krishna Raja Wadiyar IV.

He composed Manasar’, a bibliography of Indian sculptural art with emphases on Hoysala and early Chalukyan art. His other famous works include Gurugita and Shivagita on sculpture and painting with his own commentary.

Later, he founded a sculpture school opposite to the Kamakameshwari temple in Mysore. The school was named Jagadguru Shaivashilpa Brahmarshi Gurukula and it was inaugurated by Maharajah Jayachamarajendra Wadiyar in 1949.

Sri Siddalinga Swami served as official palace artist until his death in 1952.

== Gallery ==
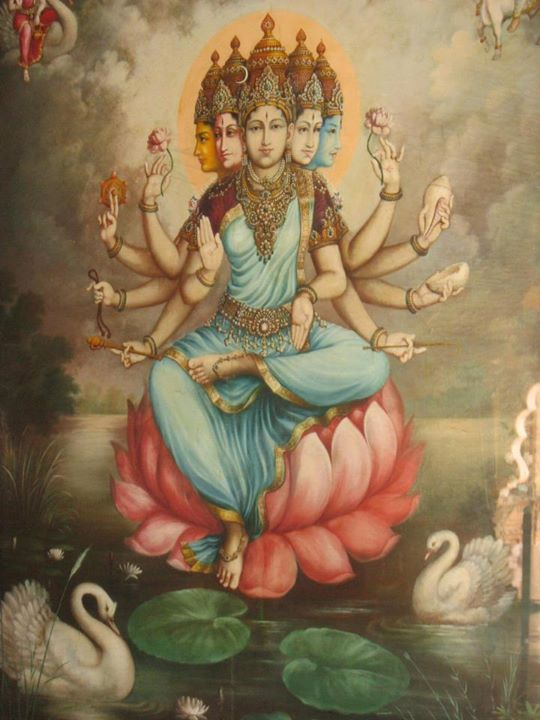
Sri Gayatridevi at Mysore Palace museum

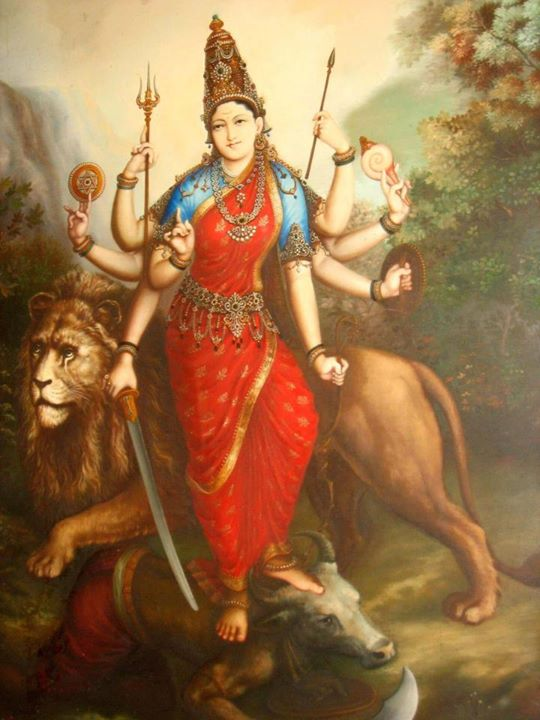
Sri Chamundeshwari at Mysore Palace museum

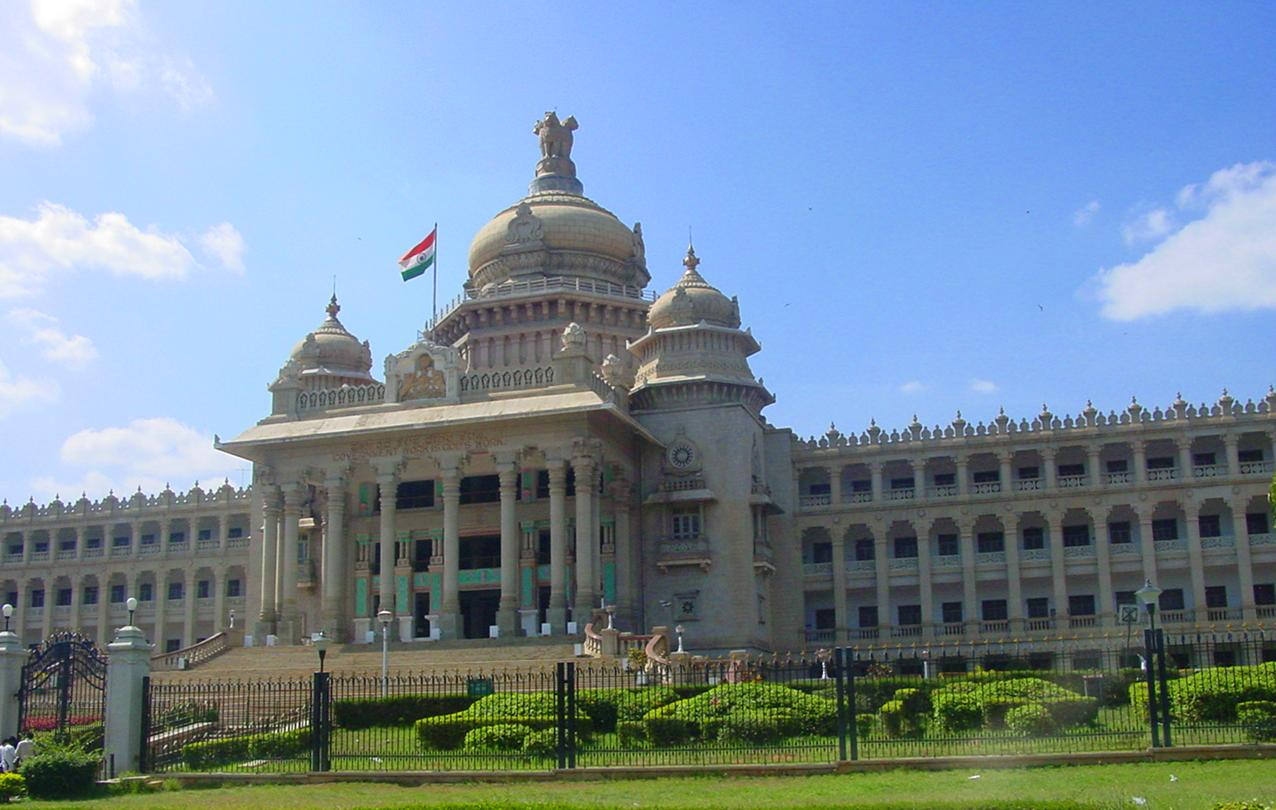
Domes, pillars and plaques of Vidhan Soudha were designed by Sri Siddalinga Swami
