= Ilkal sari =

Form of saree originating from Ilkal, Bagalkot, Karnataka, India

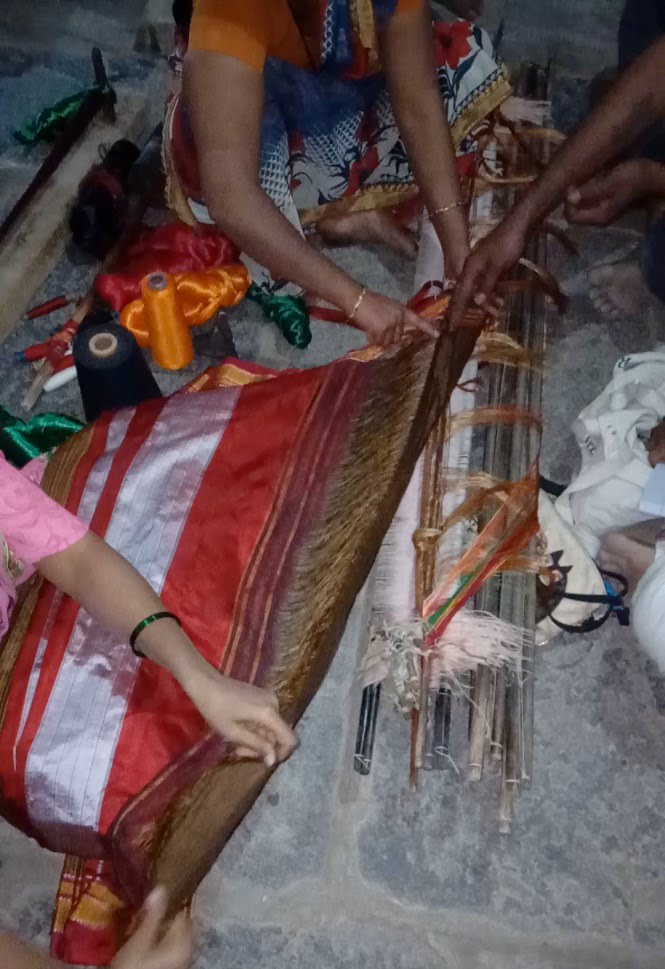
Weaving Ilkal sari

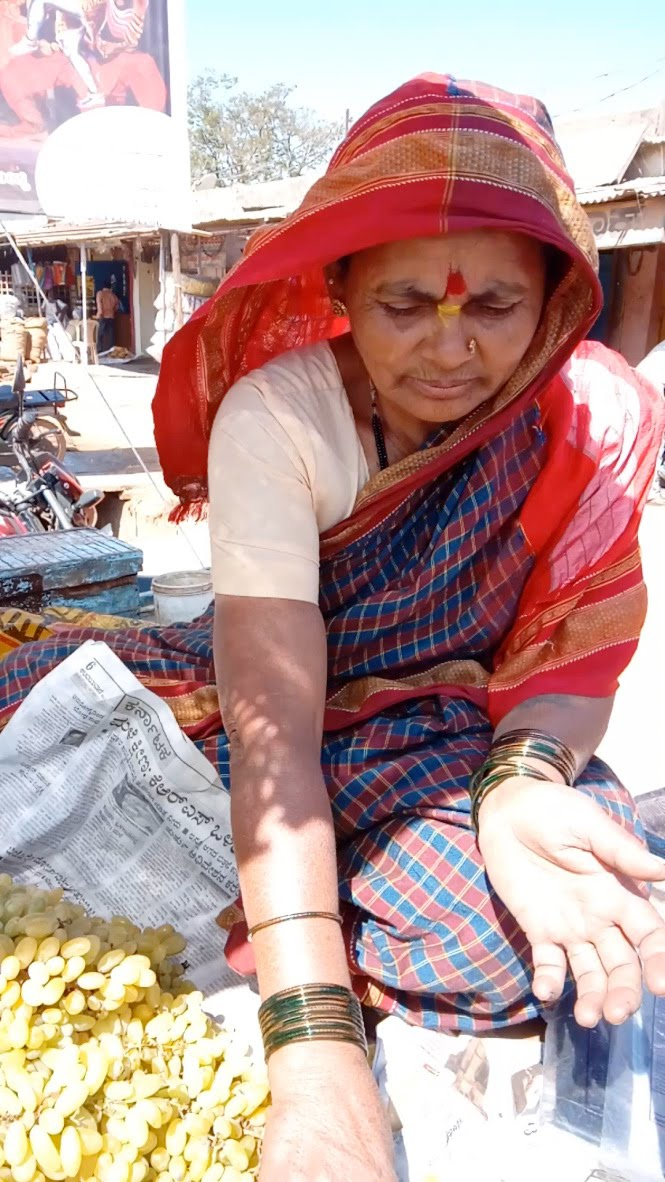
Indian woman fruit vendor wearing Ilkal sari

Ilkal sari or Ilkal seere is a traditional form of sari which is a common feminine wear in India. Ilkal sari takes its name from the town of Ilkal in the Bagalkot district of Karnataka state, India. Ilkal saris are woven using cotton warp on the body and art silk warp for border and art silk warp for pallu portion of the sari. In some cases instead of art silk, pure silk is also used.

== History ==
Ilkal was an ancient weaving centre where the weaving seems to have started in the 8th century AD. The growth of these saris is attributed to the patronage provided by the local chieftains in and around the town of Bellary. The availability of local raw materials helped in the growth of this sari. About 20000 people in the town of Ilkal are engaged in sari-weaving.

== Uniqueness ==
- The uniqueness of sari is joining of the body warp with pallu warp with a series of loops locally called as TOPE TENI technique.
- The weaver will gait only 6 yards, 8 yards, 9 yards warp due to above TOPE TENI technique. KONDI Technique is used for weft through inserting 3 shuttles (ಲಾಳಿ).
- Pallau portion-Design: "TOPE TENI SERAGU" Normally in tope teni seragu 3 solid portions would be in red colour, and in between 2 portions in white colour.
- Tope Teni seragu has been regarded as a state symbol and was greatly respected during festival occasions.
- Traditional Borders: (i) Chikki, (ii) Gomi, (iii) Jari and (iv) Gadidadi, and modern Gayathri are unique ones in Ilkal saris - width ranging from 2.5" to 4"
- Border Colour Uniqueness: Red usually or Maroon dominates.

== Description ==
The peculiar characteristic of the sari is joining the body warp with the pallu warp which is locally called as TOPE TENI. This technique is used exclusively at Ilkal. If anyone requires Ilkal sari one must prepare a warp for every sari. Warp threads for body are prepared separately. Similarly pallu warp is prepared separately either with art silk or pure silk depending upon the quality required. Thirdly border portion of warp is prepared, like the pallu warp, either art silk or pure silk and the colour used for pallu and on border will be one and the same. In general, the length of the pallu will range 16" to 27". The pallu threads and body threads are joined in loop technique, a unique method locally called TOPE TENI.

== Features ==
The distinctive feature of Ilkal saris is the use of a form of embroidery called Kasuti. The designs used in Kasuti reflect traditional patterns like palanquins, elephants and lotuses which are embroidered onto Ilkal saris. These saris are usually 9 yards in length and the pallu of the Ilkal sari (the part worn over the shoulder) carries designs of temple towers. This pallu is usually made of red silk with white patterns. The end region of the pallu is made up of patterns of different shapes like hanige (comb), koti kammli (fort ramparts), toputenne (jowar) and rampa (mountain range). The border of the sari is very broad (4 to 6 inches) and red or maroon in colour and is made of different designs with ochre patterns. The sari is either made of cotton, or a mixture of cotton and silk or in pure silk. The colors traditionally used are pomegranate red, brilliant peacock green and parrot green. The saris that are made for bridal wear are made of a particular colour called Giri Kumukum which is associated with the sindhoor worn by the wives of the priests in this region.

Types of Borders

The design woven in the length wise borders are mainly three types:

- Gomi (more popularly known as Ilkal dadi)
- Paraspet (Sub-divided into chikki paras and dodd paras)
- Gaadi
- Jari

Main Body design

- Stripes
- Rectangles
- Squares

Other Differences

With above broad parameters the Ilkal saris differ in matters of size, nature and quality of yarn used for different portion of sari as also colour combination and combinations of designs on the borders and main body of the sari. The beauty of Tope-teni seragu is further enhanced at times by weaving in its middle portion, yet another design known as ‘Kyadgi’.

== Production ==
Weaving of Ilkal saris is mostly an indoor activity. It is essentially a household enterprise involving active participation of female members. To weave one sari with the help of the handloom, it takes about 7 days. We can weave it with the help of the powerloom also.

== Methods of Production ==
Ilkal traditional saris are produced mainly on pit looms with the combination of three types of different yarns namely Silk x Silk, Silk x Cotton, Art silk x Cotton. Along with the above said yarn combination totally four different traditional designs are produced - they are Chikki Paras, Gomi, Jari and recently modified traditional design Gayathri.

These saris are produced in different lengths 6.00 yards, 8.00 yards, and 9.00 yards with solid as well as contrast borders.

The main distinction in these saris is its attached temple type Pallav (locally called as TOPE TENI) by inter locking body warp and pallav warp using loop system and inserting weft by three shuttles using two different colours yarn by Kondi technique.

A weaver requires apart from himself two others for preparatory work.

== See also ==
- Bidriware
- Byadagi chilli
- Mysore Sandal Soap
- Navalgund Durries
