= Ajanta Caves =

Buddhist cave monuments in Maharashtra, India

UNESCO World Heritage Site
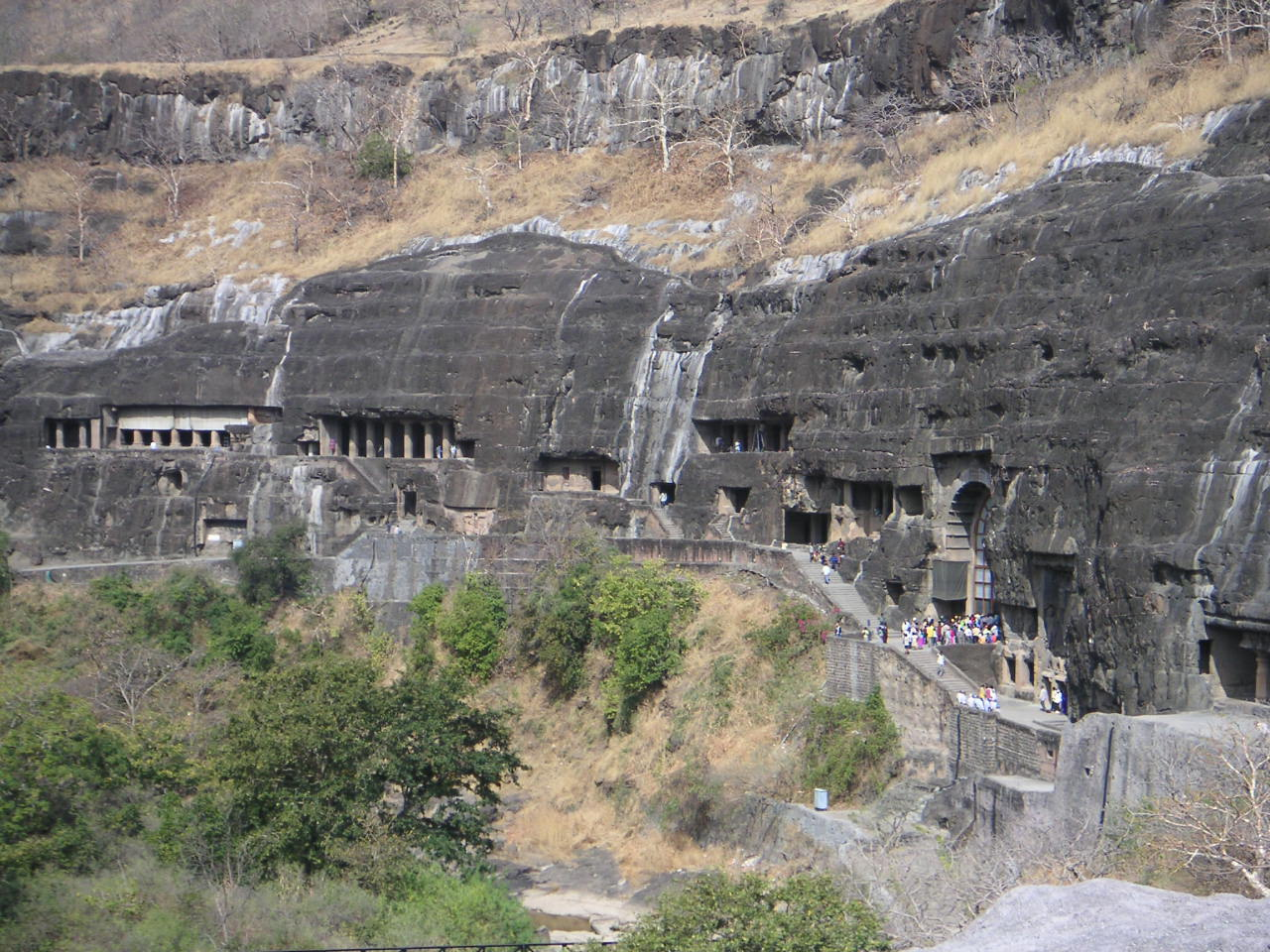
- The Ajanta Caves

- Location within India Location within Maharashtra
- Location: Ajanta, Aurangabad district, Maharashtra, India
- Criteria: Cultural: i, ii, iii, vi
- Reference: 242
- Inscription: 1983 (7th Session)
- Area: 8,242 ha (20,370 acres)
- Buffer zone: 78,676 ha (194,410 acres)
- Coordinates: 20°33′12″N 75°42′01″E

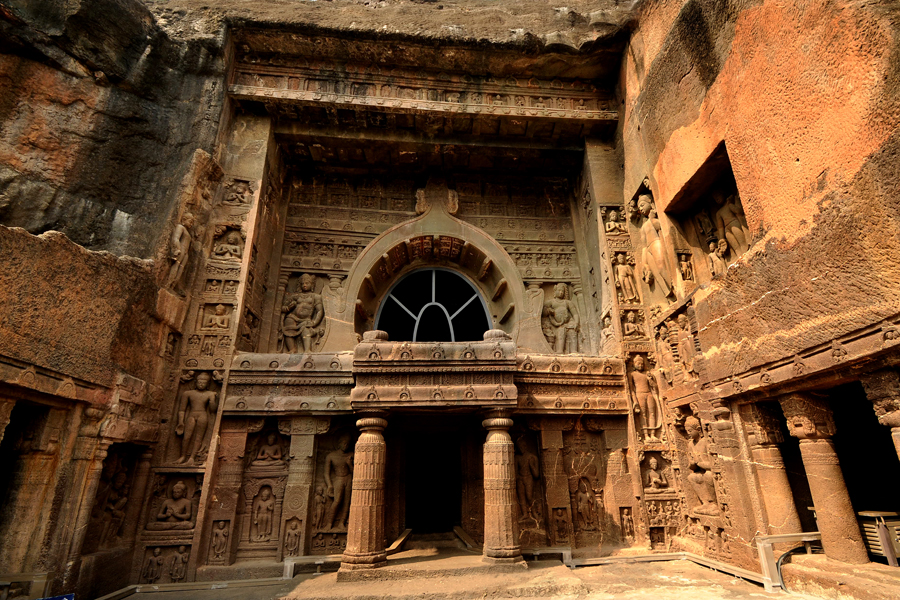
Cave 19, Ajanta 5th-century chaitya hall.

The Ajanta Caves are 30 rock-cut Buddhist cave monuments dating from the second century BCE to about 480 CE in Aurangabad district of Maharashtra state in India. Ajanta Caves are a UNESCO World Heritage Site. Universally regarded as masterpieces of Buddhist religious art, the caves include paintings and rock-cut sculptures, described as among the finest surviving examples of ancient Indian art, particularly expressive paintings that present emotions through gesture, pose and form.

The caves were built in two phases, the first starting around the second century BCE and the second occurring from 400 to 650 CE, according to older accounts, or in a brief period of 460–480 CE according to later scholarship.

The Ajanta Caves constitute ancient monasteries (Viharas) and worship-halls (Chaityas) of different Buddhist traditions carved into a 75-metre (246 ft) wall of rock. The caves also present paintings depicting the past lives and rebirths of the Buddha, pictorial tales from Aryasura's Jatakamala, and rock-cut sculptures of Buddhist deities. Textual records suggest that these caves served as a monsoon retreat for monks, as well as a resting site for merchants and pilgrims in ancient India. While vivid colours and mural wall paintings were abundant in Indian history as evidenced by historical records, Caves 1, 2, 16 and 17 of Ajanta form the largest corpus of surviving ancient Indian wall-paintings.

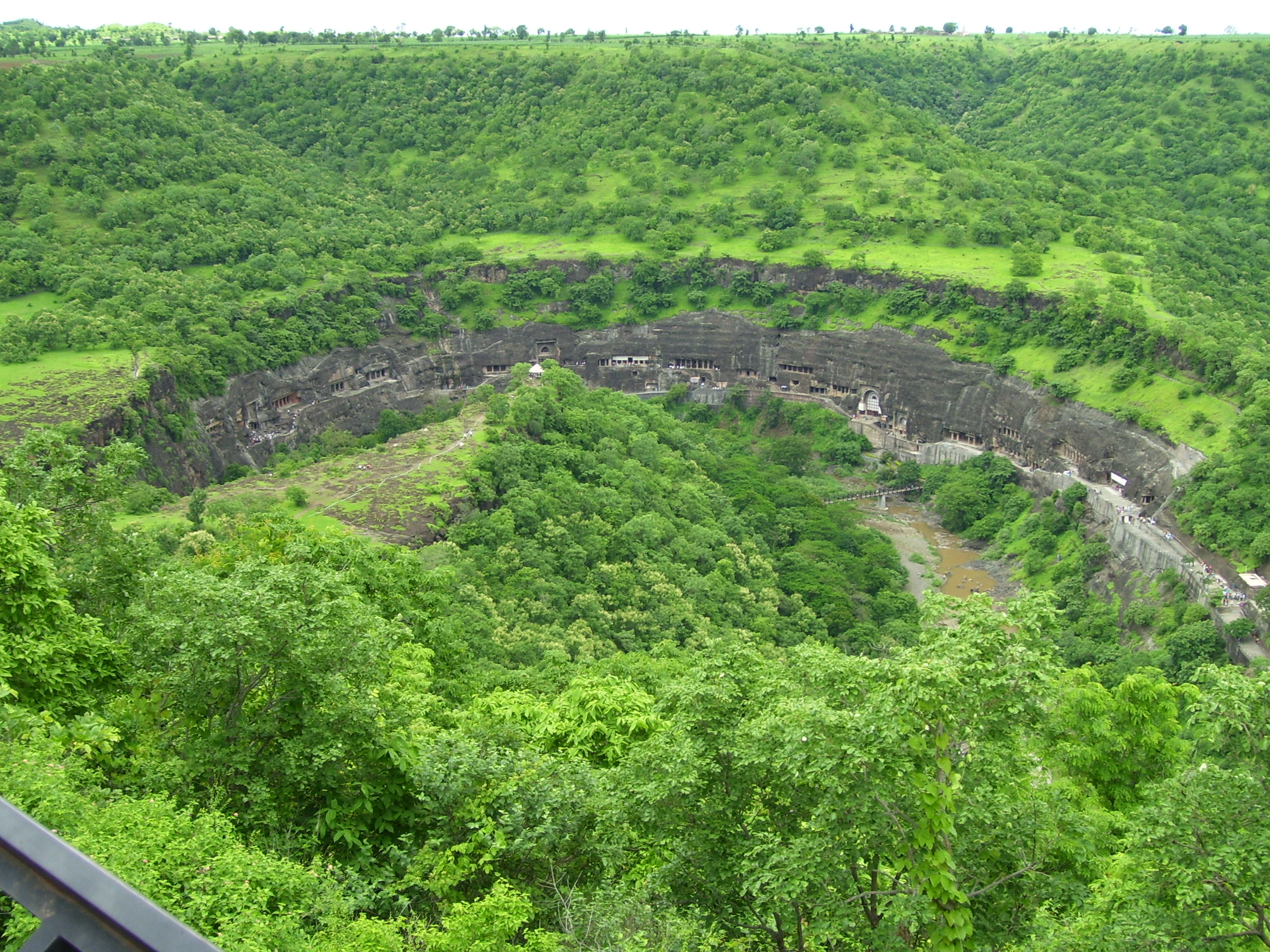
Panoramic view of Ajanta Caves from the nearby hill

The Ajanta Caves are mentioned in the memoirs of several medieval-era Chinese Buddhist travelers. They were covered by the jungle until accidentally "discovered" and brought to contemporary attention in 1819 by Colonel John Smith during a tiger-hunting expedition on a tiger-hunting party. The caves are located in the rocky northern wall of the U-shaped gorge of the River Waghur, in the Deccan Plateau. Within the gorge are a number of waterfalls, audible from outside the caves when the river is high.

== Transport ==
Ajanta is one of the major tourist attractions of Maharashtra. It is about 59 kilometres (37 miles) from the city of Jalgaon, Maharashtra, India, 104 kilometres (65 miles) from the city of Aurangabad, and 350 kilometres (220 miles) east-northeast of Mumbai. The Ajanta style is also found at the Ellora Caves, another UNESCO World Heritage Site, which is 100 Kilometres (62 miles) contains Hindu, Jain, and Buddhist caves, the last dating from a period similar to Ajanta. The Ajanta style is also found in other caves such as the Elephanta Caves, Aurangabad Caves, Shivleni Caves and the cave temples of Karnataka. Nearest airports are Jalgaon and Sambhaji Nagar, followed by Mumbai, and nearest railway stations are Jalgaon and Bhusawal.

== History ==
Map of Ajanta Caves

The Ajanta Caves are generally agreed to have been made in two distinct phases; first during the 2nd century BCE to 1st century CE, and second several centuries later.

The caves consist of 36 identifiable foundations, some of them discovered after the original numbering of the caves from 1 through 29. The later-identified caves have been suffixed with the letters of the alphabet, such as 15A, identified between originally numbered caves 15 and 16. The cave numbering is a convention of convenience and does not reflect the chronological order of their construction.

=== Caves of the first period (Satavahana) ===
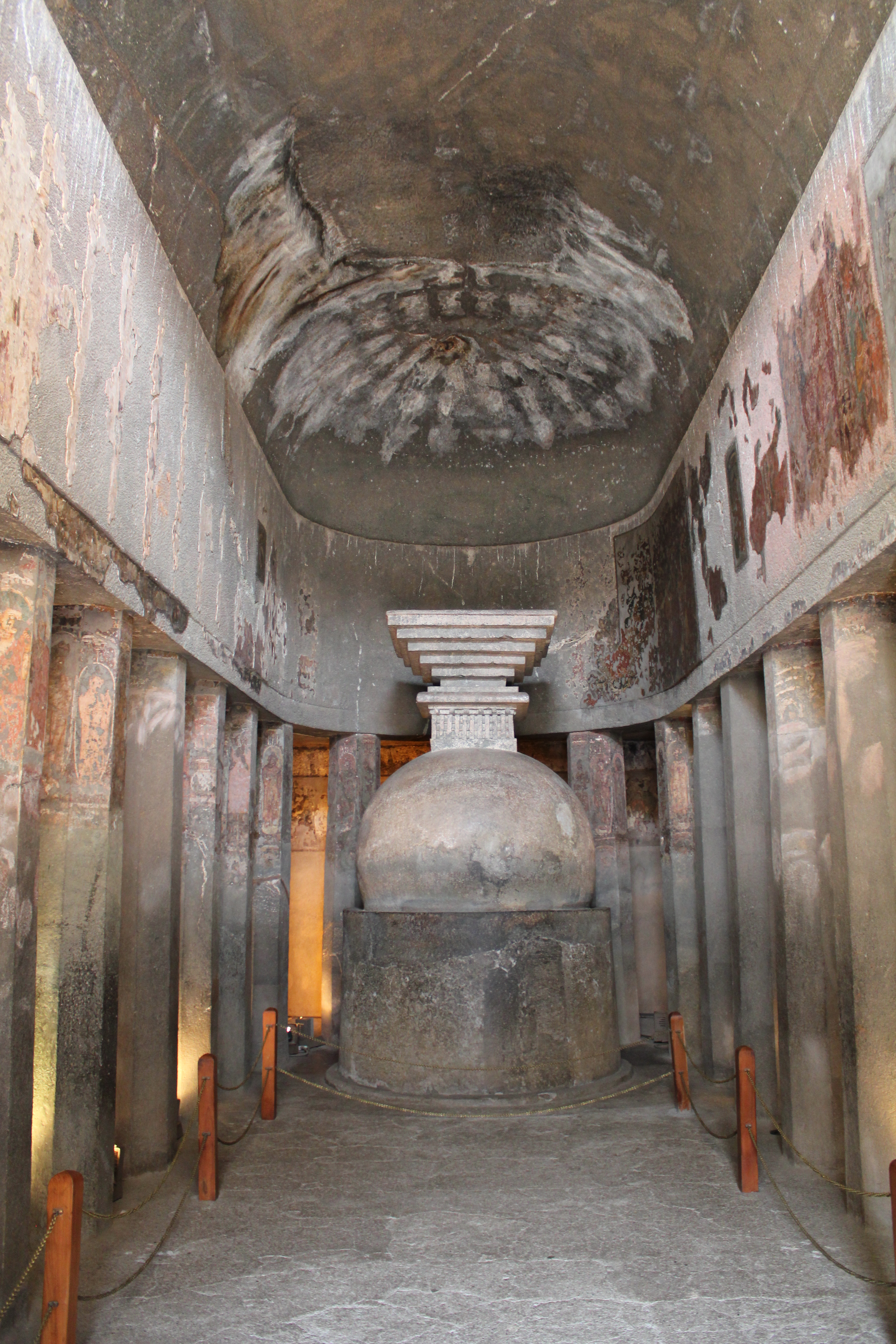
Cave 9, a first-period Theravada-style chaitya worship hall with stupa but no idols

The earliest group consists of caves 9, 10, 12, 13 and 15 A. The murals in these caves depict stories from the Jatakas. Later caves reflect the artistic influence of the Gupta period, but there are differing opinions on which century in which the early caves were built. According to Walter Spink, they were made during the period 100 BCE to 100 CE, probably under the patronage of the Satavahana dynasty (230 BCE – 220 CE) who ruled the region. Other datings prefer the period of the Maurya Empire (300 BCE to 100 BCE). Of these, caves 9 and 10 are stupa containing worship halls of chaitya-griha form, and caves 12, 13, and 15A are vihāras (see the architecture section below for descriptions of these types). The first Satavahana period caves lacked figurative sculpture, emphasizing the stupa instead.

According to Spink, once the Satavahana period caves were made, the site was not further developed for a considerable period until the mid-5th century. However, the early caves were in use during this dormant period, and Buddhist pilgrims visited the site, according to the records left by Chinese pilgrim Faxian around 400 CE.

=== Caves of the later or Vakataka period ===
The second phase of construction at the Ajanta Caves site began in the 5th century. For a long time it was thought that the later caves were made over an extended period from the 4th to the 7th centuries CE, but in recent decades a series of studies by the leading expert on the caves, Walter M. Spink, have argued that most of the work took place over the very brief period from 460 to 480 CE, during the reign of Hindu Emperor Harishena of the Vākāṭaka dynasty. However, this view has been challenged by several scholars, including Karl Khandalavala, Ajay Mitra Shastri, M.N. Deshpande, and Hans Bakker, who argue for a longer chronology extending into the mid-6th century. The Archaeological Survey of India (ASI), the government agency responsible for the site, maintains that the peak of activity occurred between the mid-5th and mid-6th centuries CE, and that the second phase of paintings continued for the next two centuries. A solitary Rashtrakuta inscription in Cave 26 indicates that the site remained in use during the 8th–9th centuries CE.

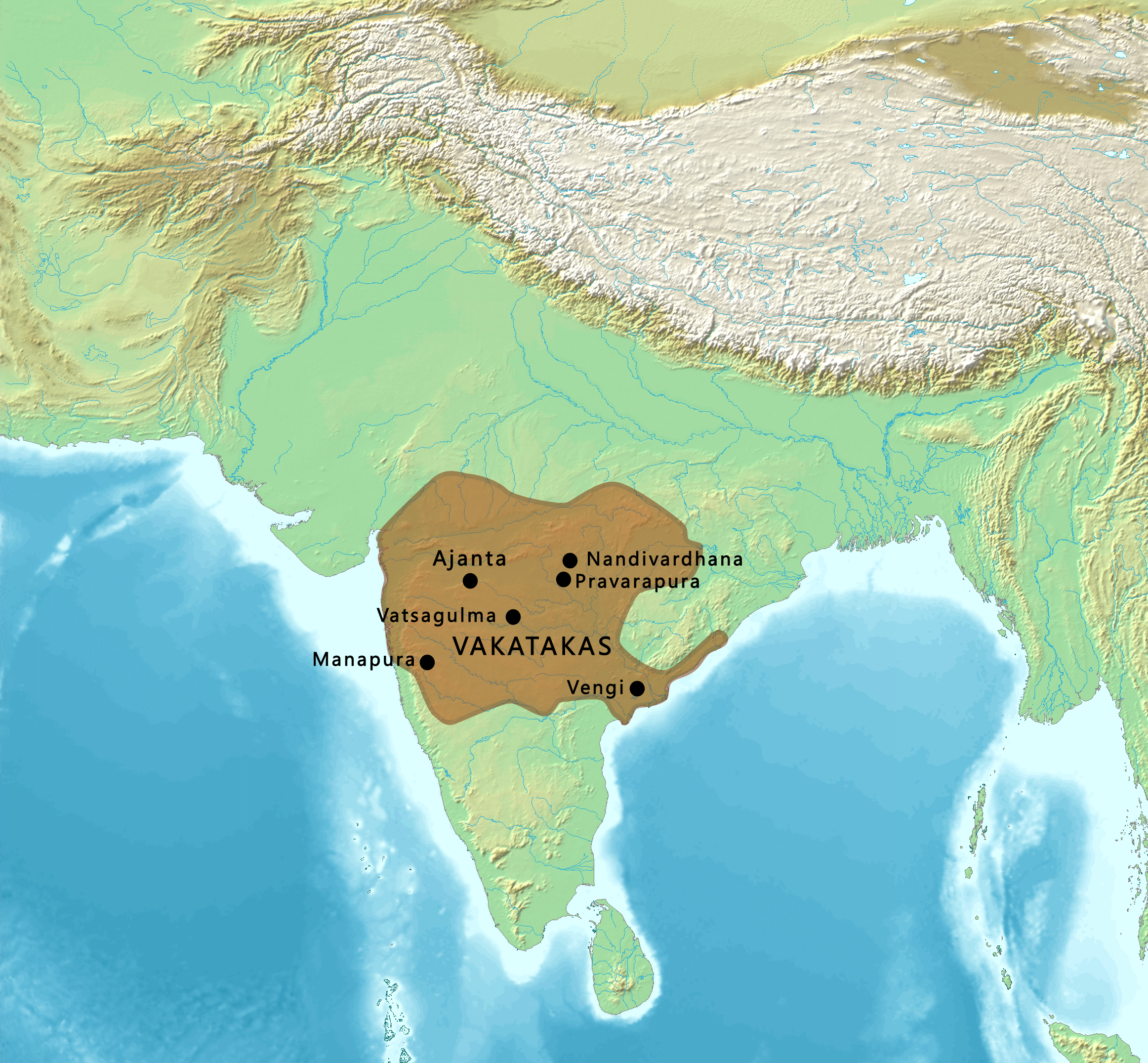
Approximate extent of Vakataka territory and location of neighbouring polities circa 480 CE, during the reign of king Harishena, when most of the caves of Ajanta were built.

The second phase is attributed to the theistic Mahāyāna, or Greater Vehicle tradition of Buddhism. Caves of the second period are 1–8, 11, 14–29, some possibly extensions of earlier caves. Caves 19, 26, and 29 are chaitya-grihas, the rest viharas. The most elaborate caves were produced in this period, which included some refurbishing and repainting of the early caves.

Spink states that it is possible to establish dating for this period with a very high level of precision; a fuller account of his chronology is given below. Although debate continues, Spink's ideas are increasingly widely accepted, at least in their broad conclusions. The Archaeological Survey of India website still presents the traditional dating: "The second phase of paintings started around 5th–6th centuries A.D. and continued for the next two centuries".

According to Spink, the construction activity at the incomplete Ajanta Caves was abandoned by wealthy patrons in about 480 CE, a few years after the death of Harishena. However, states Spink, the caves appear to have been in use for a period of time as evidenced by the wear of the pivot holes in caves constructed close to 480 CE. The second phase of constructions and decorations at Ajanta corresponds to the very apogee of Classical India, or India's golden age. However, at that time, the Gupta Empire was already weakening from internal political issues and from the assaults of the Hūṇas, so that the Vakatakas were actually one of the most powerful empires in India. Some of the Hūṇas, the Alchon Huns of Toramana, were precisely ruling the neighbouring area of Malwa, at the doorstep of the Western Deccan, at the time the Ajanta Caves were made. Through their control of vast areas of northwestern India, the Huns may actually have acted as a cultural bridge between the area of Gandhara and the Western Deccan, at the time when the Ajanta or Pitalkhora Caves were being decorated with some designs of Gandharan inspiration, such as Buddhas dressed in robes with abundant folds.

According to Richard Cohen, a description of the caves by 7th-century Chinese Traveller Xuanzang and scattered medieval graffiti suggest that the Ajanta Caves were known and probably in use subsequently, but without a stable or steady Buddhist community presence. The Ajanta caves are mentioned in the 17th-century text Ain-i-Akbari by Abu al-Fazl, as twenty four rock-cut cave temples each with remarkable idols.

=== Colonial era/Rediscovery ===
On 28 April 1819 a British officer named John Smith, of the 28th Cavalry, while hunting tigers was shown the entrance to Cave No. 10 when a local shepherd boy guided him to the location and the door. The caves were well known by locals already. Captain Smith went to a nearby village and asked the villagers to come to the site with axes, spears, torches, and drums, to cut down the tangled jungle growth that made entering the cave difficult. He first saw ceilings with beautiful and artistically drawn faces on them, then he noticed monastic halls which helped him identify their Buddhist origin. He then deliberately damaged an image on the wall by scratching his name and the date over the painting of a bodhisattva. Since he stood on a five-foot high pile of rubble collected over the years, the inscription is well above the eye-level gaze of an adult today. A paper on the caves by William Erskine was read to the Bombay Literary Society in 1822.

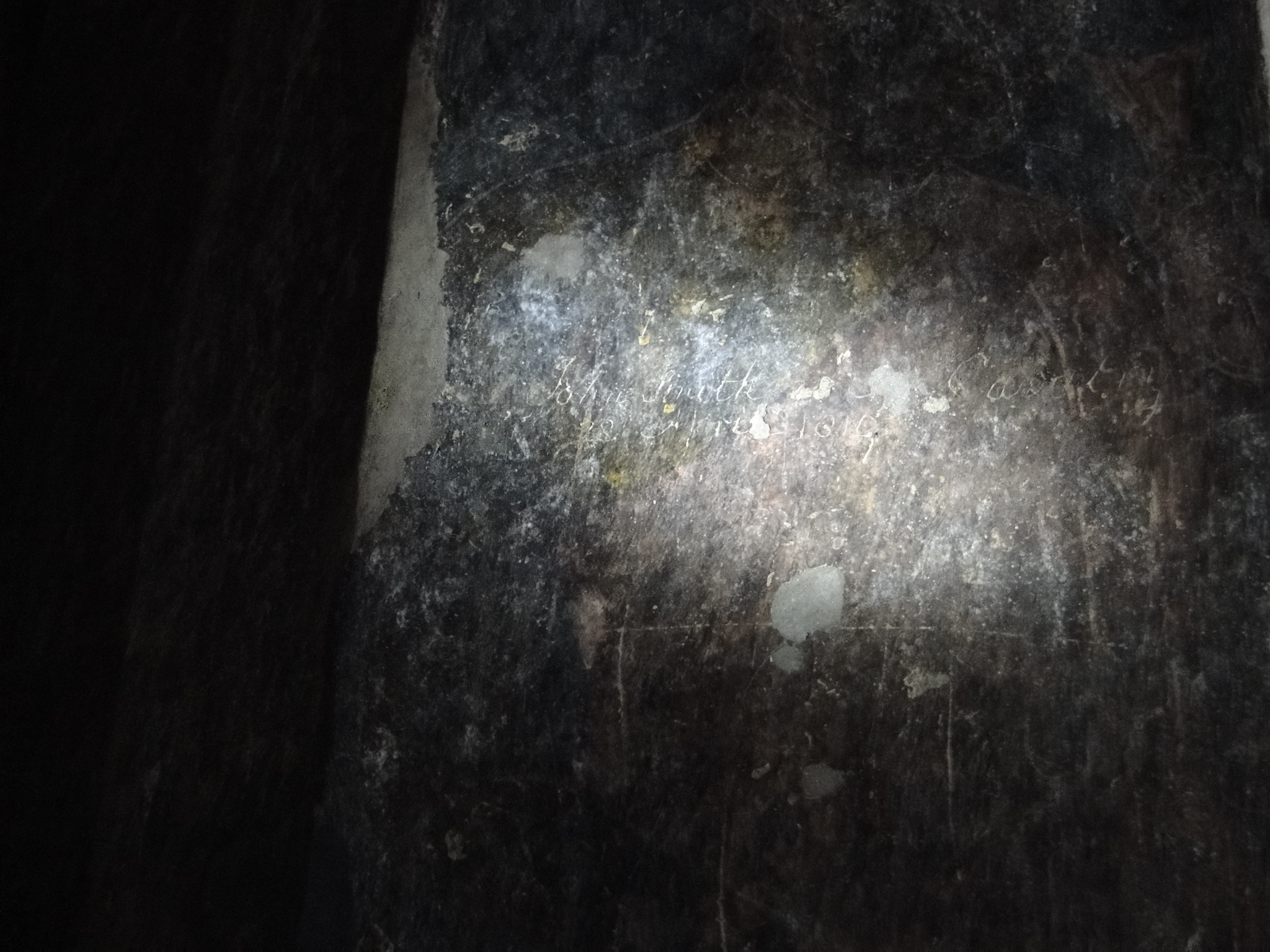
Name and date inscribed by John Smith after he found Cave 10 in 1819

Within a few decades, the caves became famous for their exotic setting, impressive architecture, and above all their exceptional and unique paintings. A number of large projects to copy the paintings were made in the century after rediscovery. In 1848, the Royal Asiatic Society established the "Bombay Cave Temple Commission" to clear, tidy and record the most important rock-cut sites in the Bombay Presidency, with John Wilson as president. In 1861 this became the nucleus of the new Archaeological Survey of India.

During the colonial era, the Ajanta site was in the territory of the princely state of the Hyderabad and not British India. In the early 1920s, Mir Osman Ali Khan, the last Nizam of Hyderabad, appointed people to restore the artwork, converted the site into a museum and built a road to bring tourists to the site for a fee. These efforts resulted in early mismanagement, states Richard Cohen, and hastened the deterioration of the site. Post-independence, the state government of Maharashtra built arrival, transport, facilities, and better site management. The modern Visitor Center has good parking facilities and public conveniences and ASI operated buses run at regular intervals from Visitor Center to the caves.

The Nizam's Director of Archaeology obtained the services of two experts from Italy, Professor Lorenzo Cecconi, assisted by Count Orsini, to restore the paintings in the caves. The Director of Archaeology for the last Nizam of Hyderabad said of the work of Cecconi and Orsini:

The repairs to the caves and the cleaning and conservation of the frescoes have been carried out on such sound principles and in such a scientific manner that these matchless monuments have found a fresh lease of life for at least a couple of centuries.

Despite these efforts, later neglect led to the paintings degrading in quality once again.

Since 1983, Ajanta caves have been listed among the UNESCO World Heritage Sites of India. The Ajanta Caves, along with the Ellora Caves, have become the most popular tourist destination in Maharashtra, and are often crowded at holiday times, increasing the threat to the caves, especially the paintings. In 2012, the Maharashtra Tourism Development Corporation announced plans to add to the ASI visitor centre at the entrance complete replicas of caves 1, 2, 16 & 17 to reduce crowding in the originals, and enable visitors to receive a better visual idea of the paintings, which are dimly-lit and hard to read in the caves.

== Sites and monasteries ==
=== Sites ===
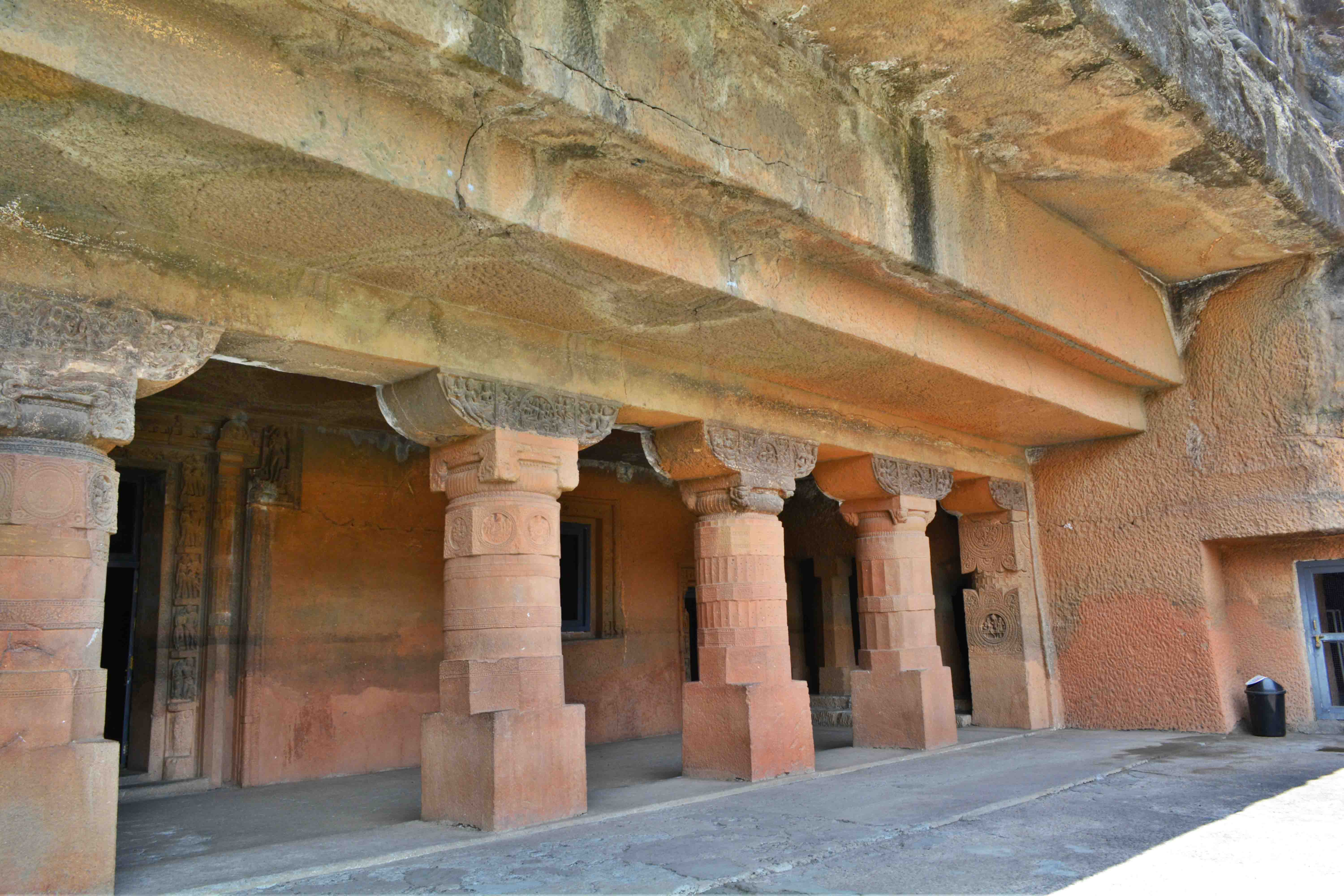
Cave 24; the Ajanta Caves were carved into a massive rock on the Deccan plateau.

The caves are carved out of flood basalt and granite rock of a cliff, part of the Deccan Traps formed by successive volcanic eruptions at the end of the Cretaceous geological period. The rock is layered horizontally, and somewhat variable in quality. This variation within the rock layers required the artists to amend their carving methods and plans in places. The inhomogeneity in the rock has also led to cracks and collapses in the centuries that followed, as with the lost portico to cave 1. Excavation began by cutting a narrow tunnel at roof level, which was expanded downwards and outwards; as evidenced by some of the incomplete caves such as the partially-built vihara caves 21 through 24 and the abandoned incomplete cave 28.

The sculpture artists likely worked at both excavating the rocks and making the intricate carvings of pillars, roof, and idols; further, the sculpture and painting work inside a cave were integrated parallel tasks. A grand gateway to the site was carved, at the apex of the gorge's horseshoe between caves 15 and 16, as approached from the river, and it is decorated with elephants on either side and a nāga, or protective Naga (snake) deity. Similar methods and application of artist talent is observed in other cave temples of India, such as those from Hinduism and Jainism. These include the Ellora Caves, Ghatotkacha Caves, Elephanta Caves, Bagh Caves, Badami Caves, Aurangabad Caves and Shivleni Caves.

The caves from the first period seem to have been paid for by a number of different patrons to gain merit, with several inscriptions recording the donation of particular portions of a single cave. The later caves were each commissioned as a complete unit by a single patron from the local rulers or their court elites, again for merit in Buddhist afterlife beliefs as evidenced by inscriptions such as those in Cave 17. After the death of Harisena, smaller donors motivated by getting merit added small "shrinelets" between the caves or add statues to existing caves, and some two hundred of these "intrusive" additions were made in sculpture, with a further number of intrusive paintings, up to three hundred in cave 10 alone.

=== Monasteries ===
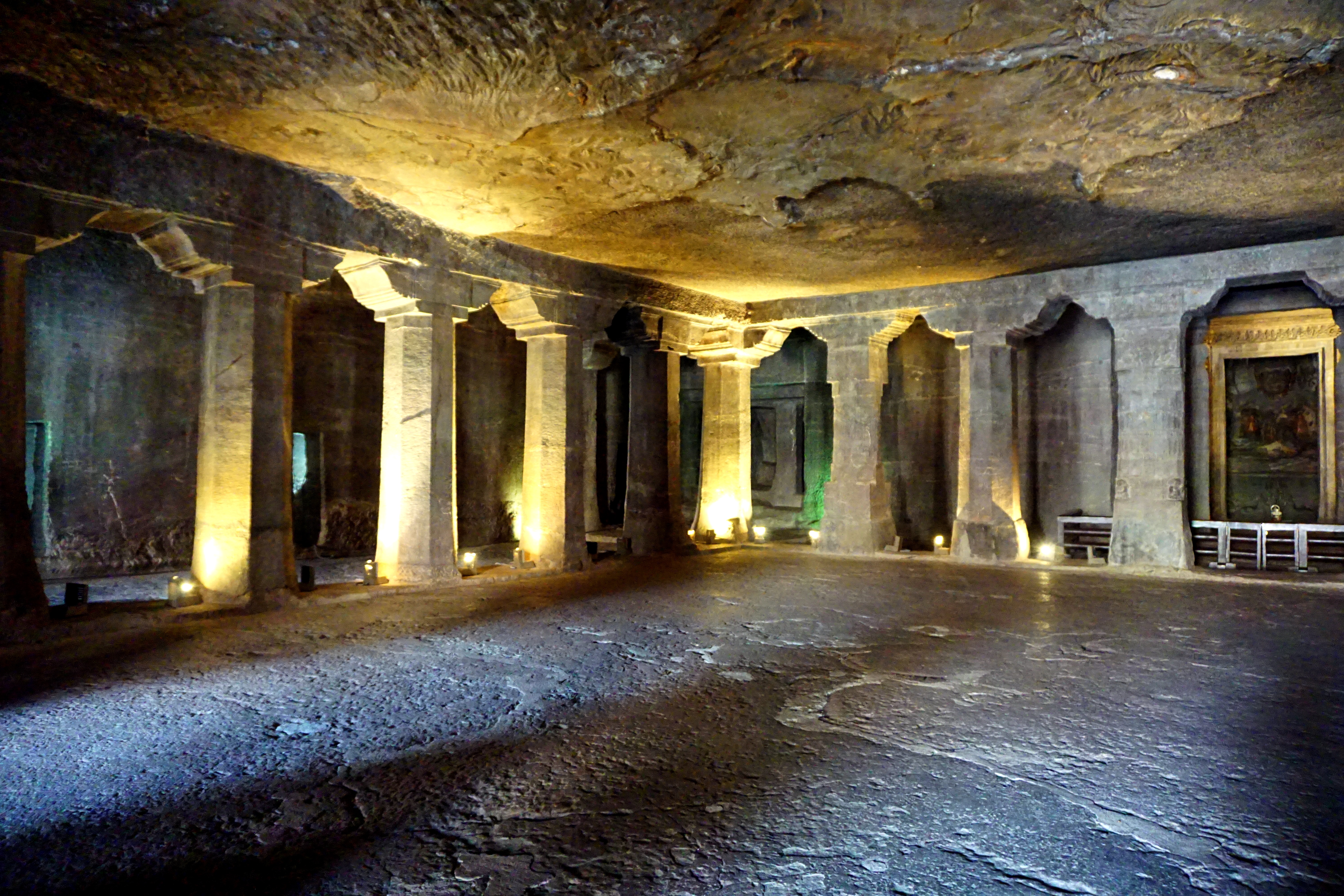
Cave 4: a monastery, or vihara, with its square hall surrounded by monks' cells

The majority of the caves are vihara halls with symmetrical square plans. To each vihara hall are attached smaller square dormitory cells cut into the walls. A vast majority of the caves were carved in the second period, wherein a shrine or sanctuary is appended at the rear of the cave, centred on a large statue of the Buddha, along with exuberantly detailed reliefs and deities near him as well as on the pillars and walls, all carved out of the natural rock. This change reflects the shift from Hinayana to Mahāyāna Buddhism. These caves are often called monasteries.

The central square space of the interior of the viharas is defined by square columns forming a more-or-less square open area. Outside this are long rectangular aisles on each side, forming a kind of cloister. Along the side and rear walls are a number of small cells entered by a narrow doorway; these are roughly square, and have small niches on their back walls. Originally they had wooden doors. The centre of the rear wall has a larger shrine-room behind, containing a large Buddha statue.

The viharas of the earlier period are much simpler, and lack shrines. Spink places the change to a design with a shrine to the middle of the second period, with many caves being adapted to add a shrine in mid-excavation, or after the original phase.

The plan of Cave 1 shows one of the largest viharas, but is fairly typical of the later group. Many others, such as Cave 16, lack the vestibule to the shrine, which leads straight off the main hall. Cave 6 is two viharas, one above the other, connected by internal stairs, with sanctuaries on both levels.

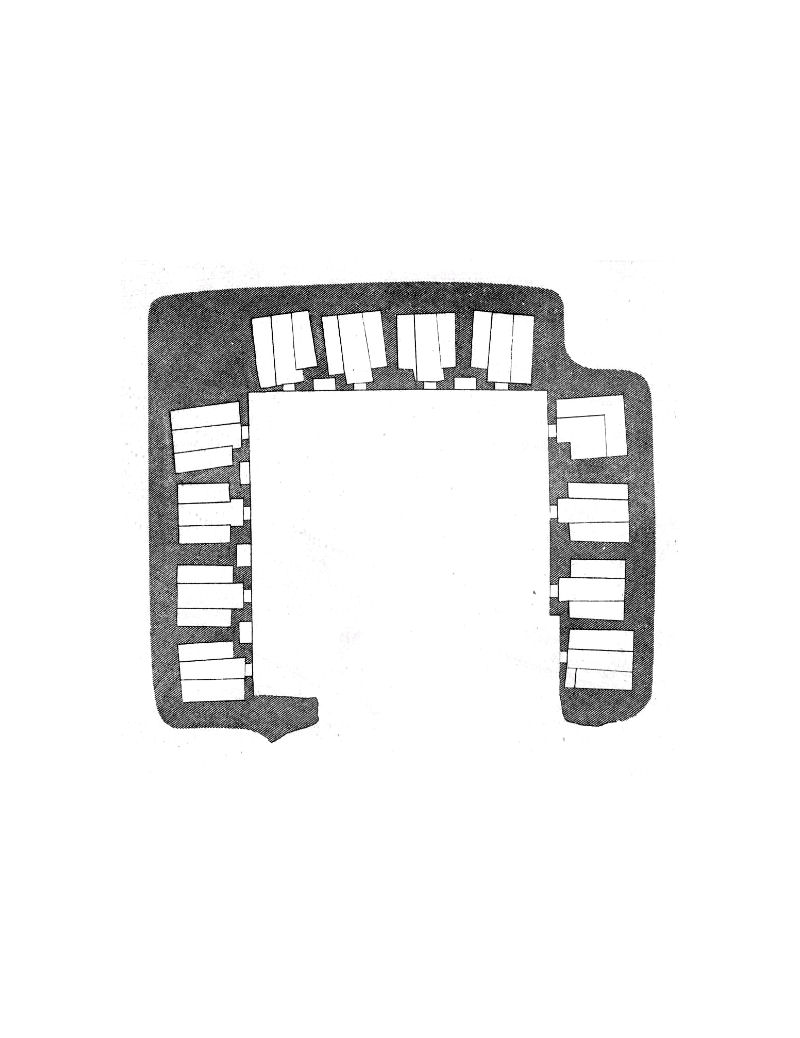
Cave 12 plan: an early type of vihara (1st century BCE) without internal shrine

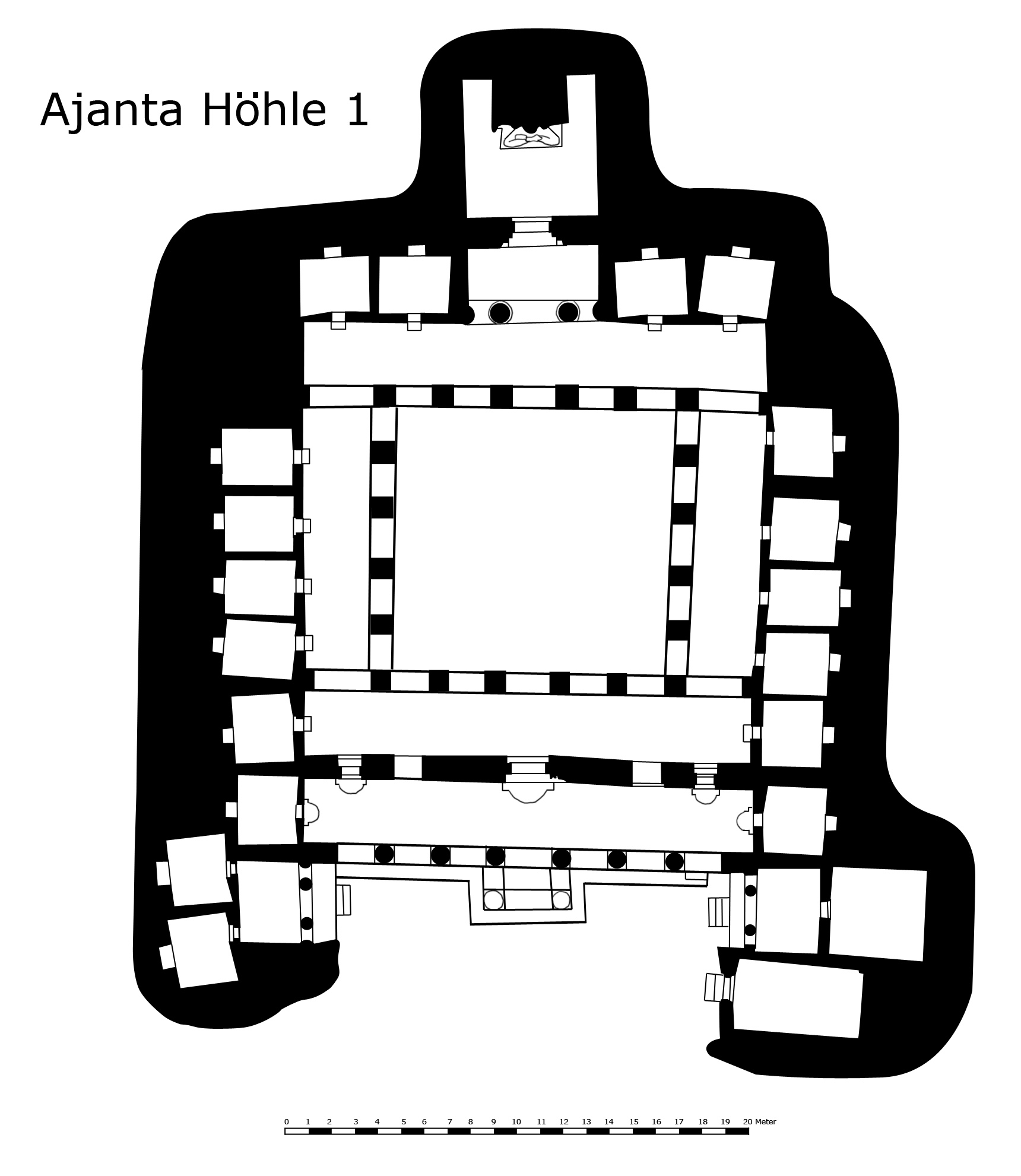
Cave 1 plan, a monastery known for its paintings

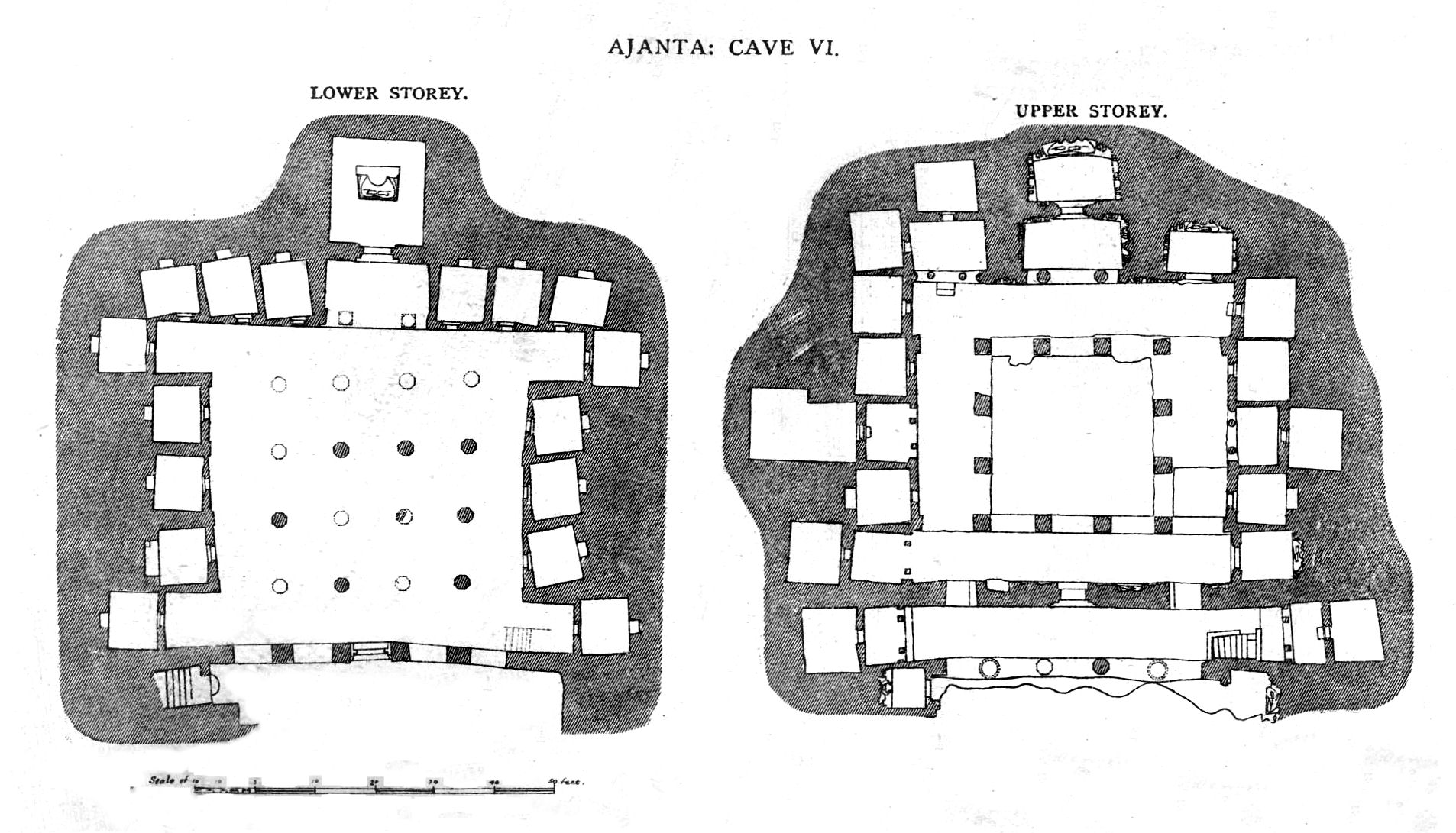
Cave 6: a two-storey monastery with "Miracle of Sravasti" and "Temptation of Mara" painted

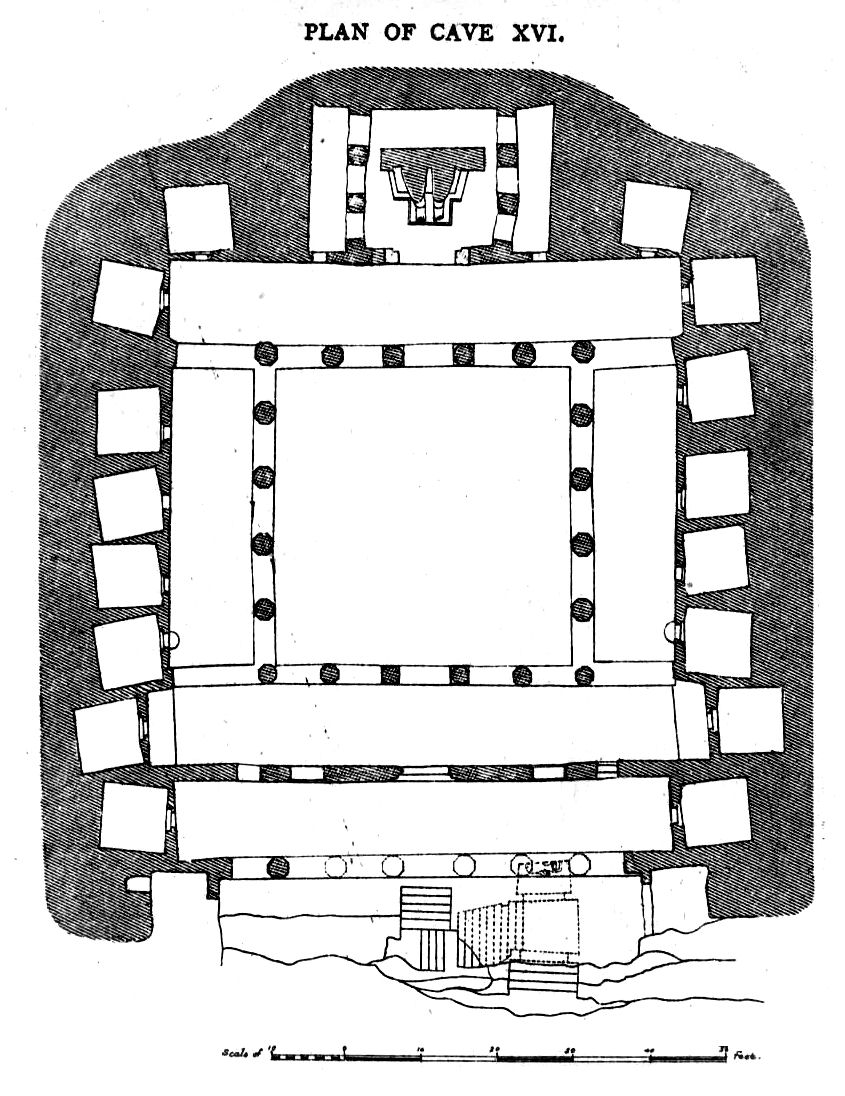
Cave 16: a monastery featuring two side aisles

=== Worship halls ===
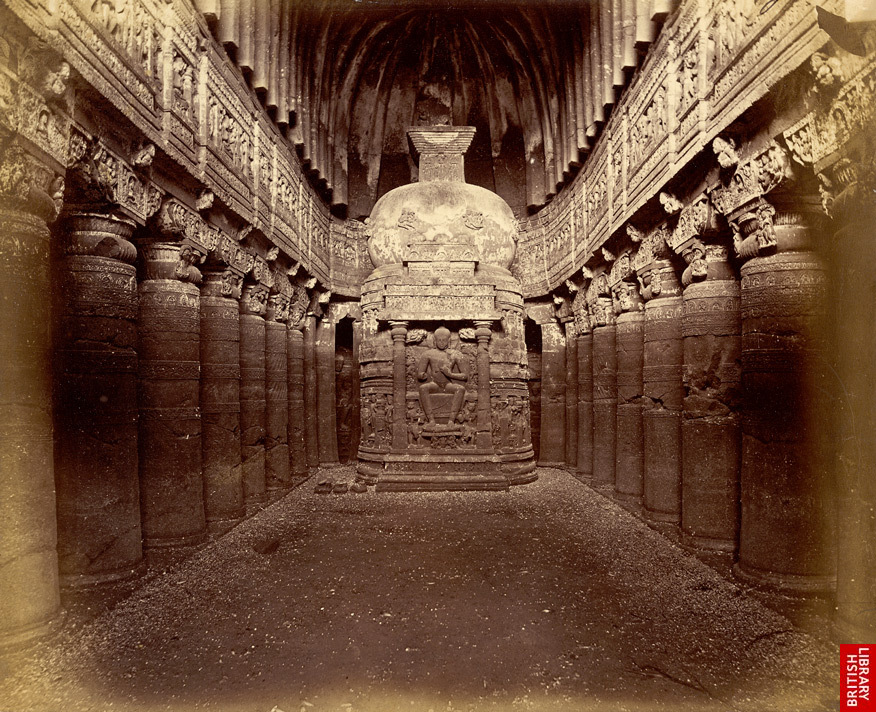
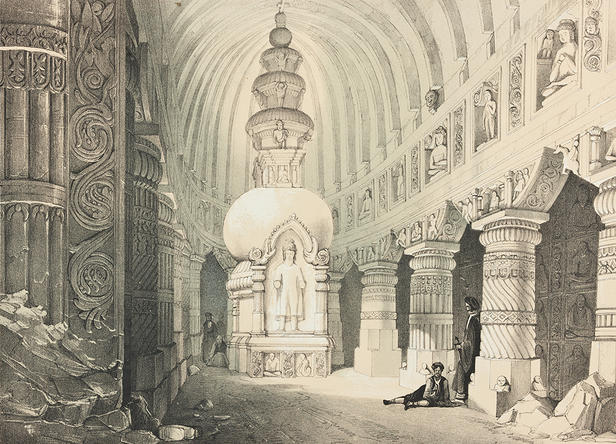
Top: Interior of Ajanta chaitya hall, Cave 26, photo by Robert Gill (c. 1868); Bottom: James Fergusson sketch of Cave 19 worship hall.

The other type of main hall architecture is the narrower rectangular plan with high arched ceiling type chaitya-griha – literally, "the house of stupa". This hall is longitudinally divided into a nave and two narrower side aisles separated by a symmetrical row of pillars, with a stupa in the apse. The stupa is surrounded by pillars and concentric walking space for circumambulation. Some of the caves have elaborate carved entrances, some with large windows over the door to admit light. There is often a colonnaded porch or verandah, with another space inside the doors running the width of the cave. The oldest worship halls at Ajanta were built in the 2nd to 1st century BCE, the newest ones in the late 5th century CE, and the architecture of both resembles the architecture of a Christian church, but without the crossing or chapel chevette. The Ajanta Caves follow the Cathedral-style architecture found in still older rock-cut cave carvings of ancient India, such as the Lomas Rishi Cave of the Ajivikas near Gaya in Bihar dated to the 3rd century BCE. These chaitya-griha are called worship or prayer halls.

The four completed chaitya halls are caves 9 and 10 from the early period, and caves 19 and 26 from the later period of construction. All follow the typical form found elsewhere, with high ceilings and a central "nave" leading to the stupa, which is near the back, but allows walking behind it, as walking around stupas was (and remains) a common element of Buddhist worship (pradakshina). The later two have high ribbed roofs carved into the rock, which reflect timber forms, and the earlier two are thought to have used actual timber ribs and are now smooth, the original wood presumed to have perished. The two later halls have a rather unusual arrangement (also found in Cave 10 at Ellora) where the stupa is fronted by a large relief sculpture of the Buddha, standing in Cave 19 and seated in Cave 26. Cave 29 is a late and very incomplete chaitya hall.

The form of columns in the work of the first period is very plain and un-embellished, with both chaitya halls using simple octagonal columns, which were later painted with images of the Buddha, people and monks in robes. In the second period columns were far more varied and inventive, often changing profile over their height, and with elaborate carved capitals, often spreading wide. Many columns are carved over all their surface with floral motifs and Mahayana deities, some fluted and others carved with decoration all over, as in cave 1.

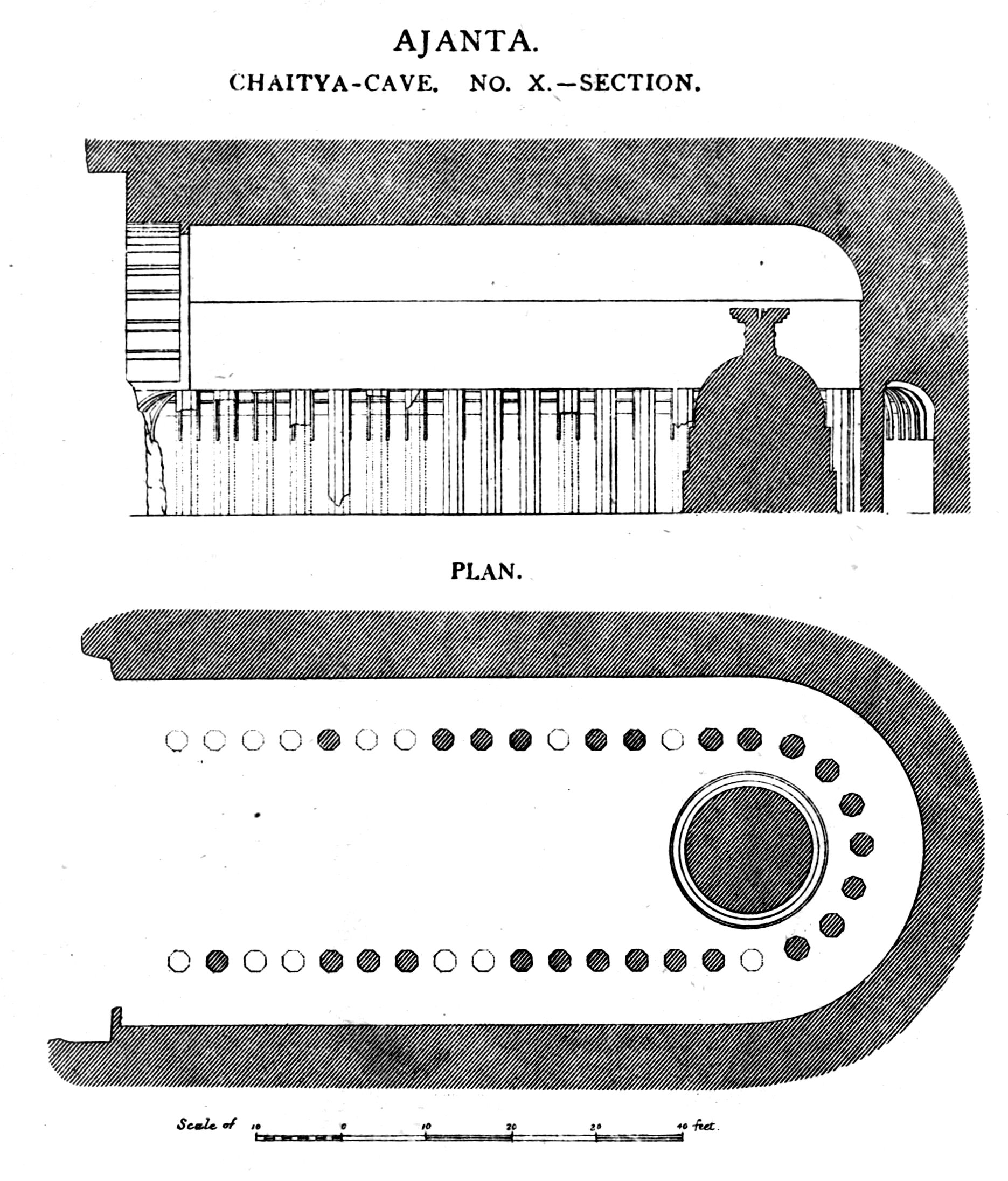
Cave 10: a worship hall with Jataka tales-related art (1st century BCE)

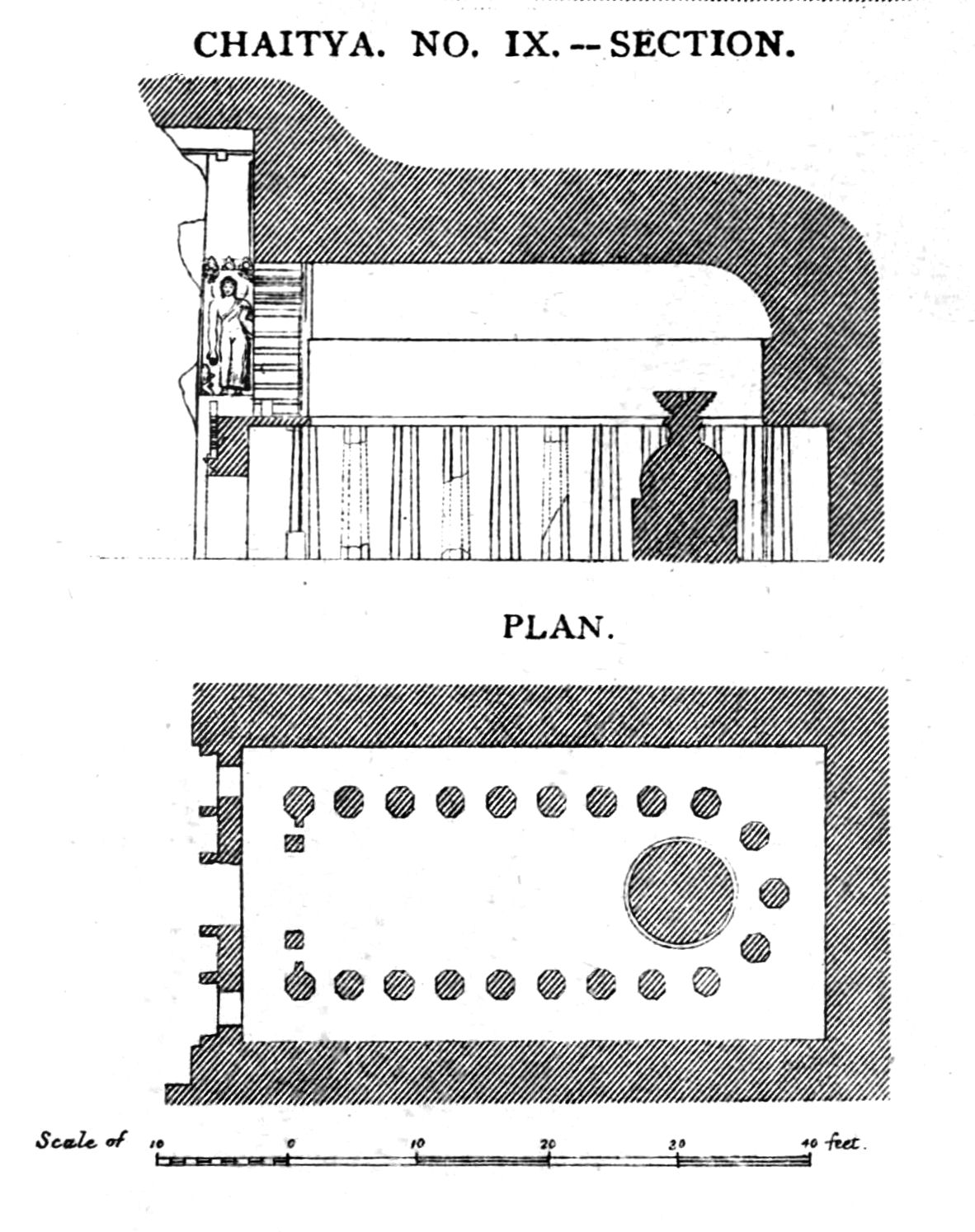
Cave 9: a worship hall with early paintings and animal friezes (1st century CE)

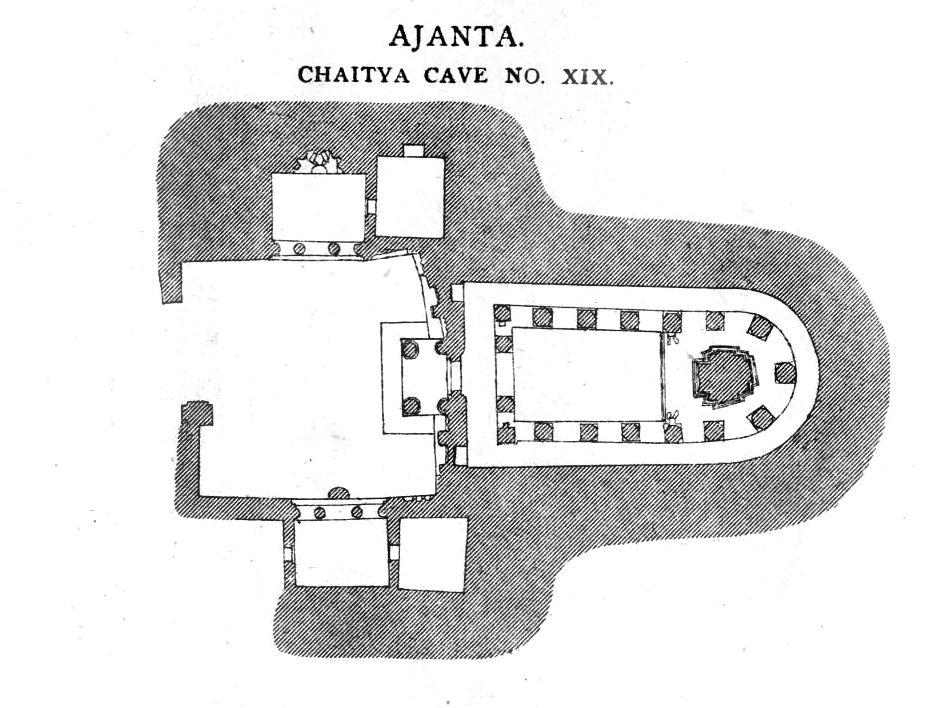
Cave 19: known for its figures of the Buddha, Kubera and other arts (5th century CE)

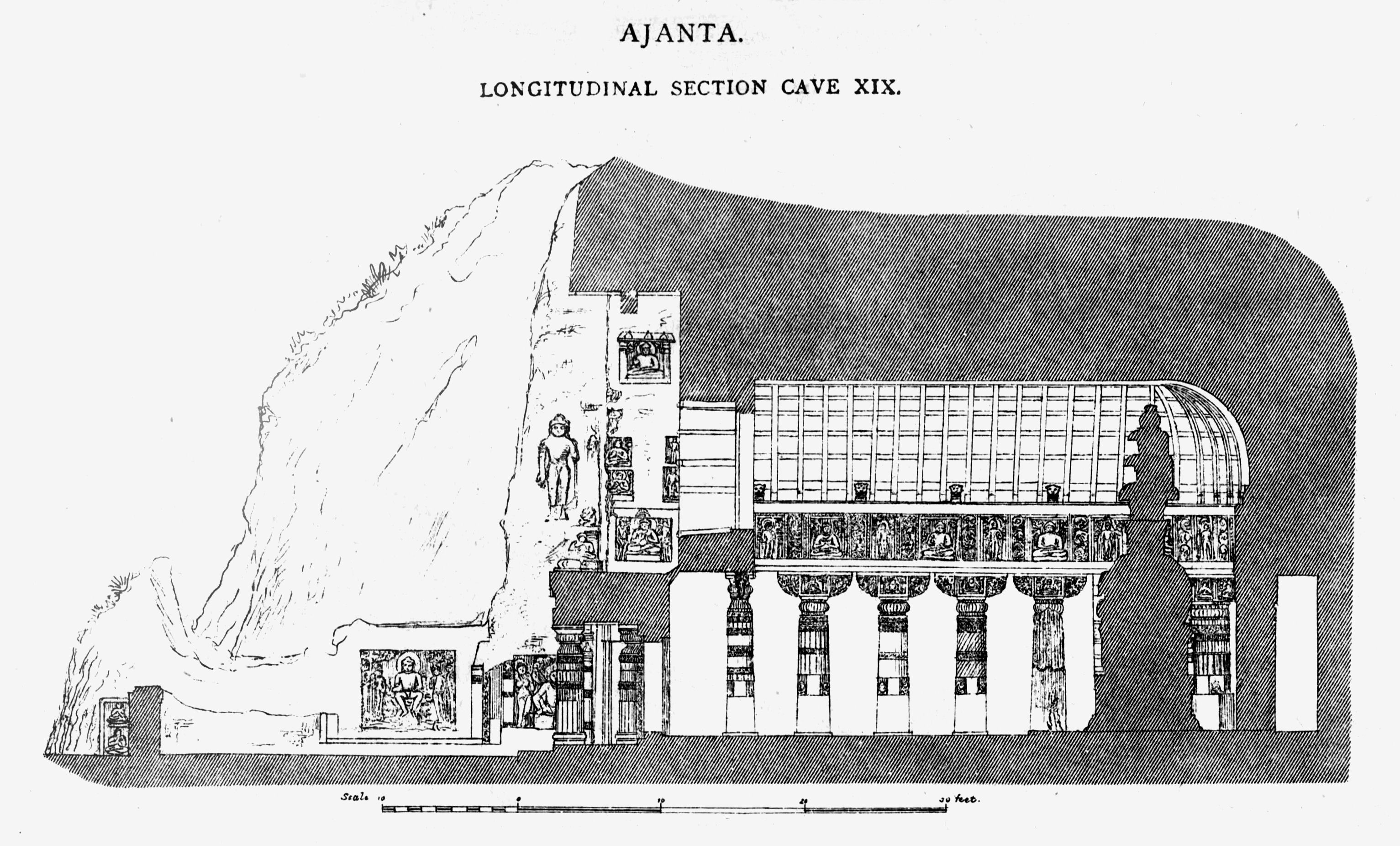
Cave 19: another view (5th century CE)

== Paintings ==
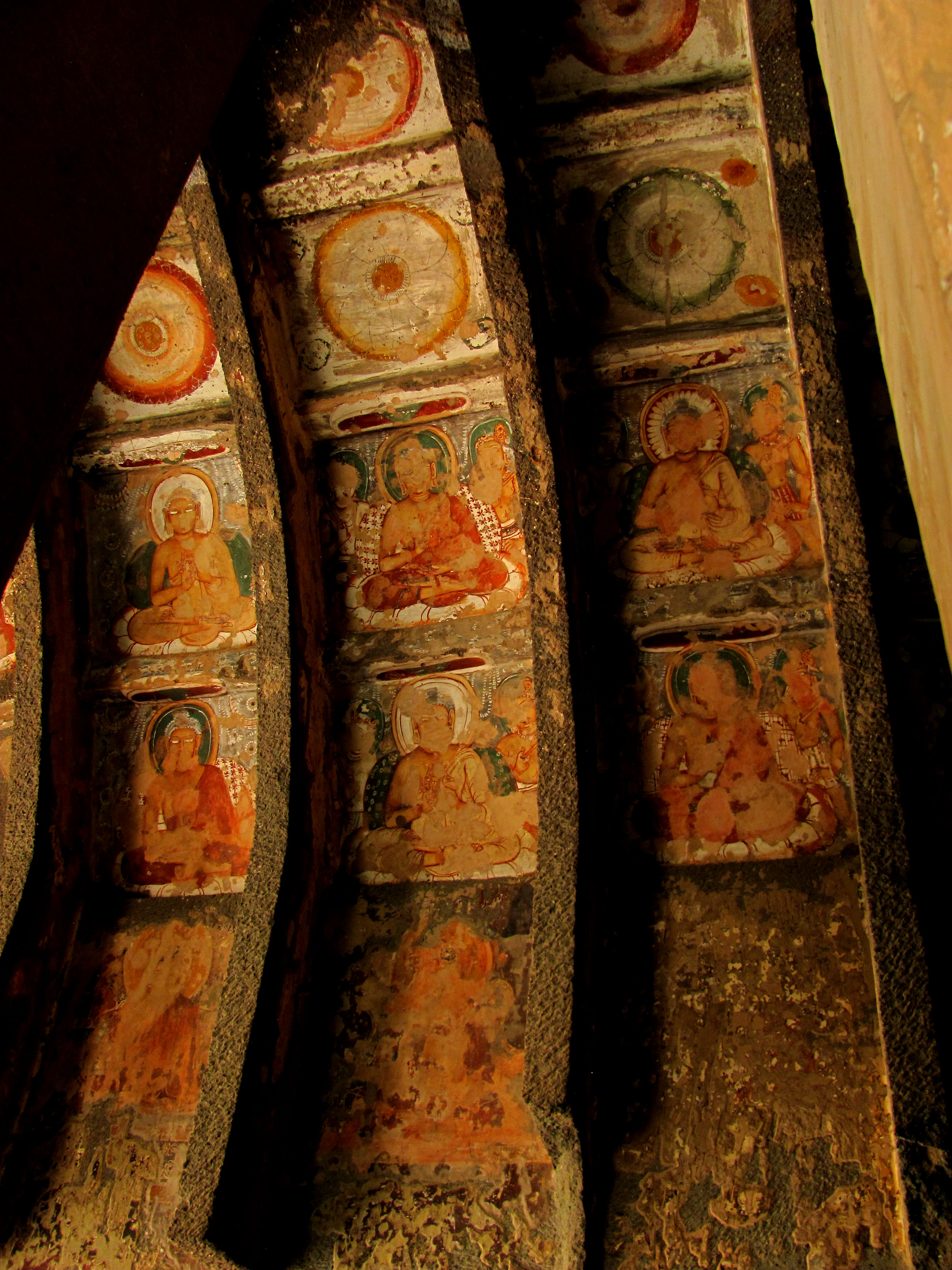
Painted ceiling depicting Life circle of Lord Buddha

Most of the Ajanta caves, and almost all the murals paintings date from nearly 600 years later, during a second phase of construction. The paintings in the Ajanta caves predominantly narrate the Jataka tales. These are Buddhist legends describing the previous births of the Buddha. These fables embed ancient morals and cultural lores that are also found in the fables and legends of Hindu and Jain texts. The Jataka tales are exemplified through the life example and sacrifices that the Buddha made in hundreds of his past incarnations, where he is depicted as having been reborn as an animal or human.

Mural paintings survive from both the earlier and later groups of caves. Several fragments of murals preserved from the earlier caves (Caves 10 and 11) are effectively unique survivals of ancient painting in India from this period, and "show that by Sātavāhana times, if not earlier, the Indian painters had mastered an easy and fluent naturalistic style, dealing with large groups of people in a manner comparable to the reliefs of the Sāñcī toraņa crossbars". Some connections with the art of Gandhara can also be noted, and there is evidence of a shared artistic idiom.

Four of the later caves have large and relatively well-preserved mural paintings which, states James Harle, "have come to represent Indian mural painting to the non-specialist", and represent "the great glories not only of Gupta but of all Indian art". They fall into two stylistic groups, with the most famous in Caves 16 and 17, and apparently later paintings in Caves 1 and 2. The latter group were thought to be a century or later than the others, but the revised chronology proposed by Spink would place them in the 5th century as well, perhaps contemporary with it in a more progressive style, or one reflecting a team from a different region. The Ajanta frescos are classical paintings and the work of confident artists, without cliches, rich and full. They are luxurious, sensuous and celebrate physical beauty, aspects that early Western observers felt were shockingly out of place in these caves presumed to be meant for religious worship and ascetic monastic life.

The paintings are in "dry fresco", painted on top of a dry plaster surface rather than into wet plaster. All the paintings appear to be the work of painters supported by discriminating connoisseurship and sophisticated patrons from an urban atmosphere. It is known from literary sources that painting was widely practised and appreciated in the Gupta period. Unlike much Indian mural painting, compositions are not laid out in horizontal bands like a frieze, but show large scenes spreading in all directions from a single figure or group at the centre. The ceilings are also painted with sophisticated and elaborate decorative motifs, many derived from sculpture. The paintings in cave 1, which according to Spink was commissioned by Harisena himself, concentrate on those Jataka tales which show previous lives of the Buddha as a king, rather than as deer or elephant or another Jataka animal. The scenes depict the Buddha as about to renounce the royal life.

In general the later caves seem to have been painted on finished areas as excavating work continued elsewhere in the cave, as shown in caves 2 and 16 in particular. According to Spink's account of the chronology of the caves, the abandonment of work in 478 after a brief busy period accounts for the absence of painting in places including cave 4 and the shrine of cave 17, the later being plastered in preparation for paintings that were never done.

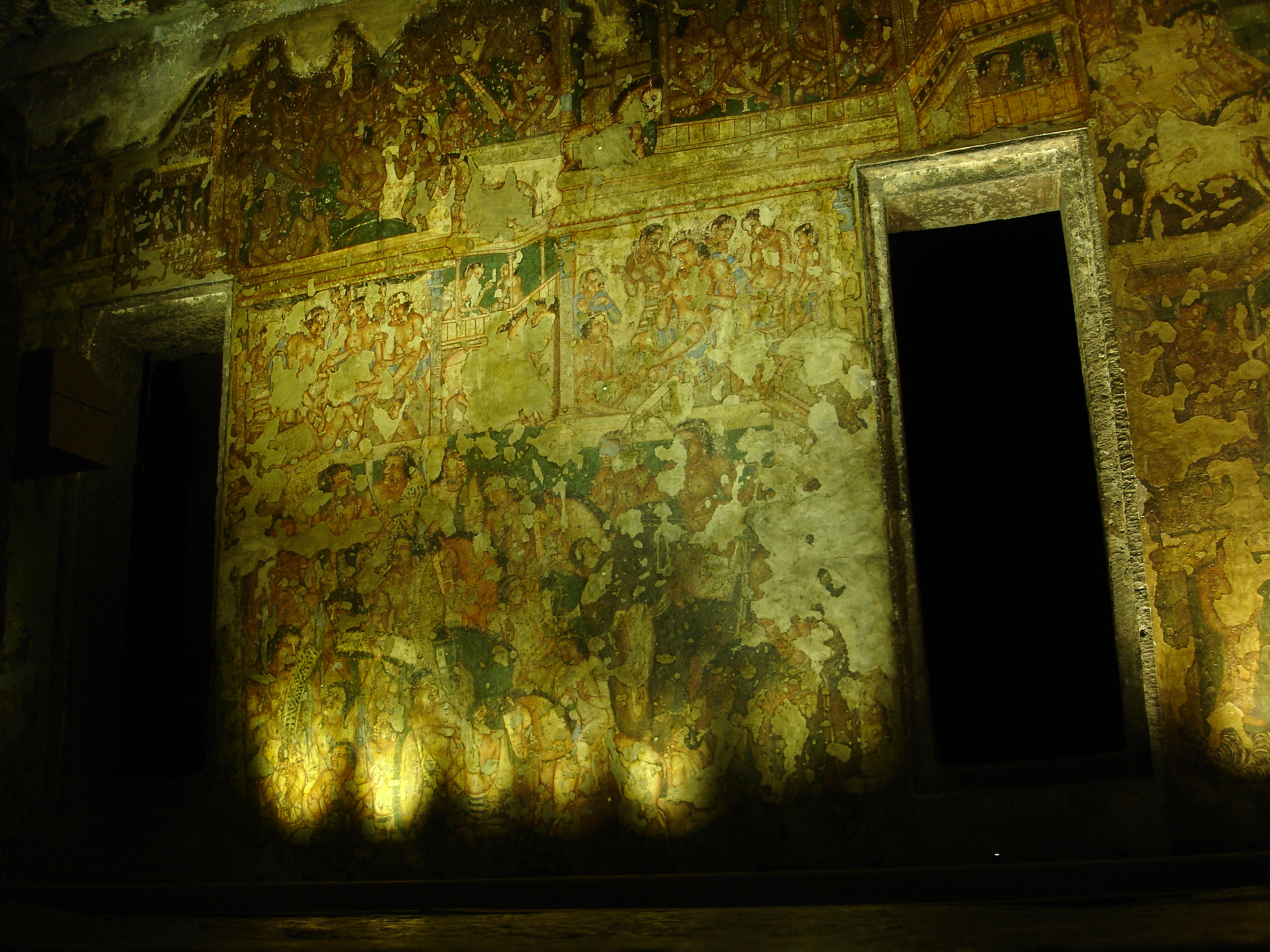
Cave 2, showing the extensive paint loss of many areas. It was never finished by its artists, and shows Vidhura Jataka.

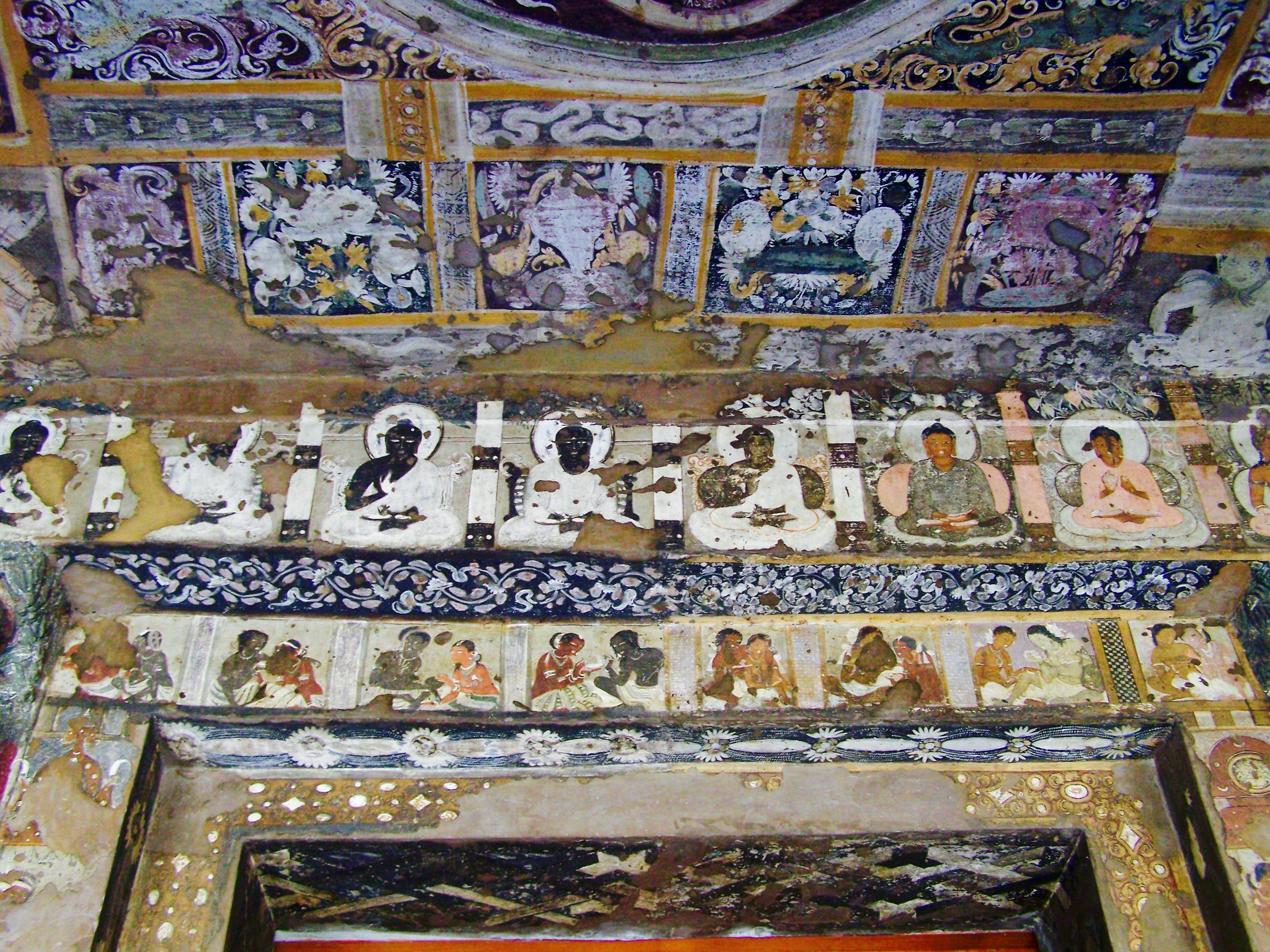
Cave 17 verandah doorway; eight Buddhas above eight couples

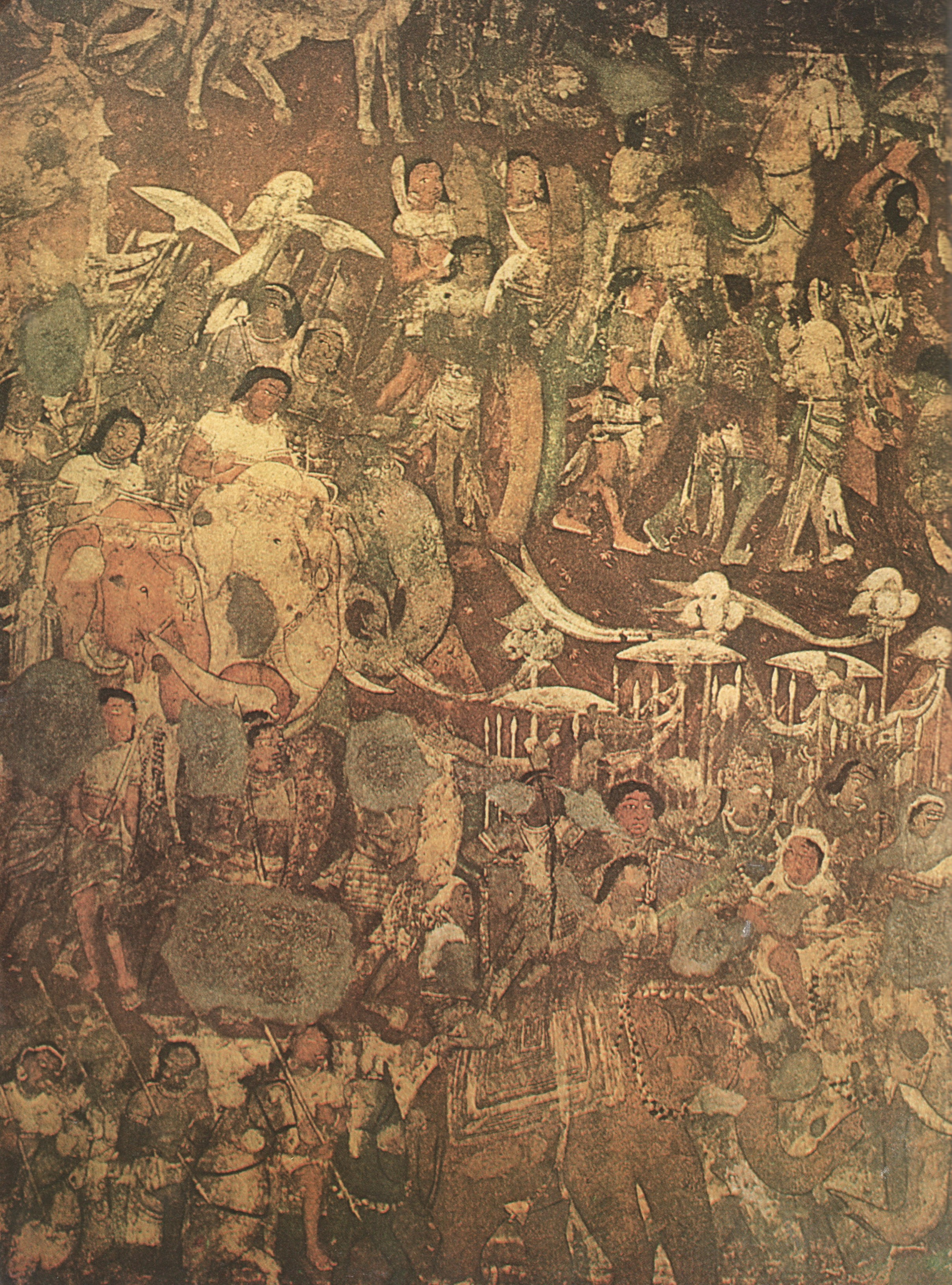
Section of the mural in Cave 17, the 'coming of Sinhala'. The prince (Prince Vijaya) is seen in both groups of elephants and riders.

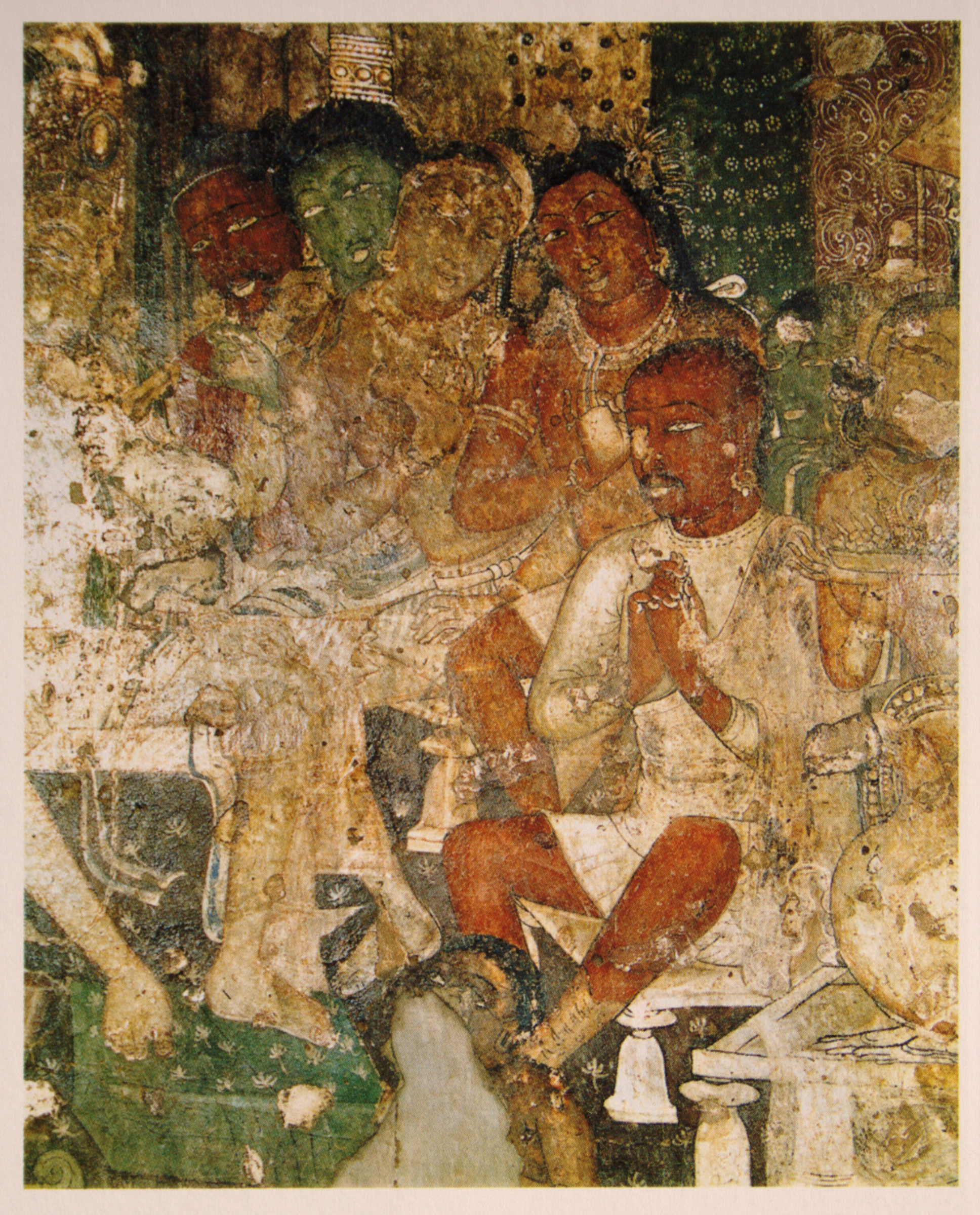
Hamsa jâtaka, cave 17: the Buddha as the golden goose in his previous life

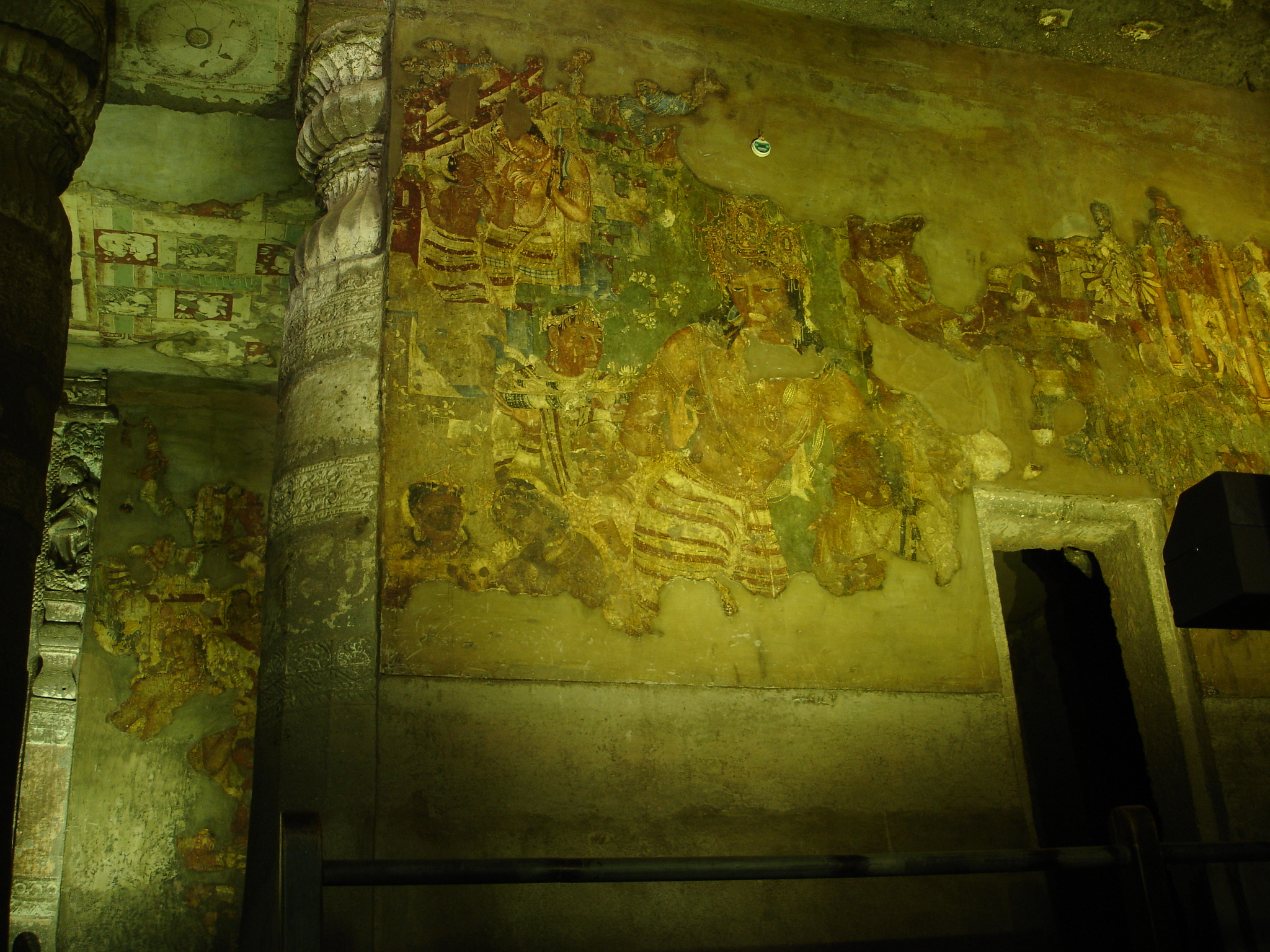
Cave 13

== Spink's chronology and cave history ==
Walter Spink has over recent decades developed a very precise and circumstantial chronology for the second period of work on the site, which unlike earlier scholars, he places entirely in the 5th century. This is based on evidence such as the inscriptions and artistic style, dating of nearby cave temple sites, comparative chronology of the dynasties, combined with the many uncompleted elements of the caves. He believes the earlier group of caves, which like other scholars he dates only approximately, to the period "between 100 BCE – 100 CE", were at some later point completely abandoned and remained so "for over three centuries". This changed during the Hindu emperor Harishena of the Vakataka Dynasty, who reigned from 460 to his death in 477, who sponsored numerous new caves during his reign. Harisena's rule extended the Central Indian Vakataka Empire to include a stretch of the east coast of India; the Gupta Empire ruled northern India at the same period, and the Pallava dynasty much of the south.

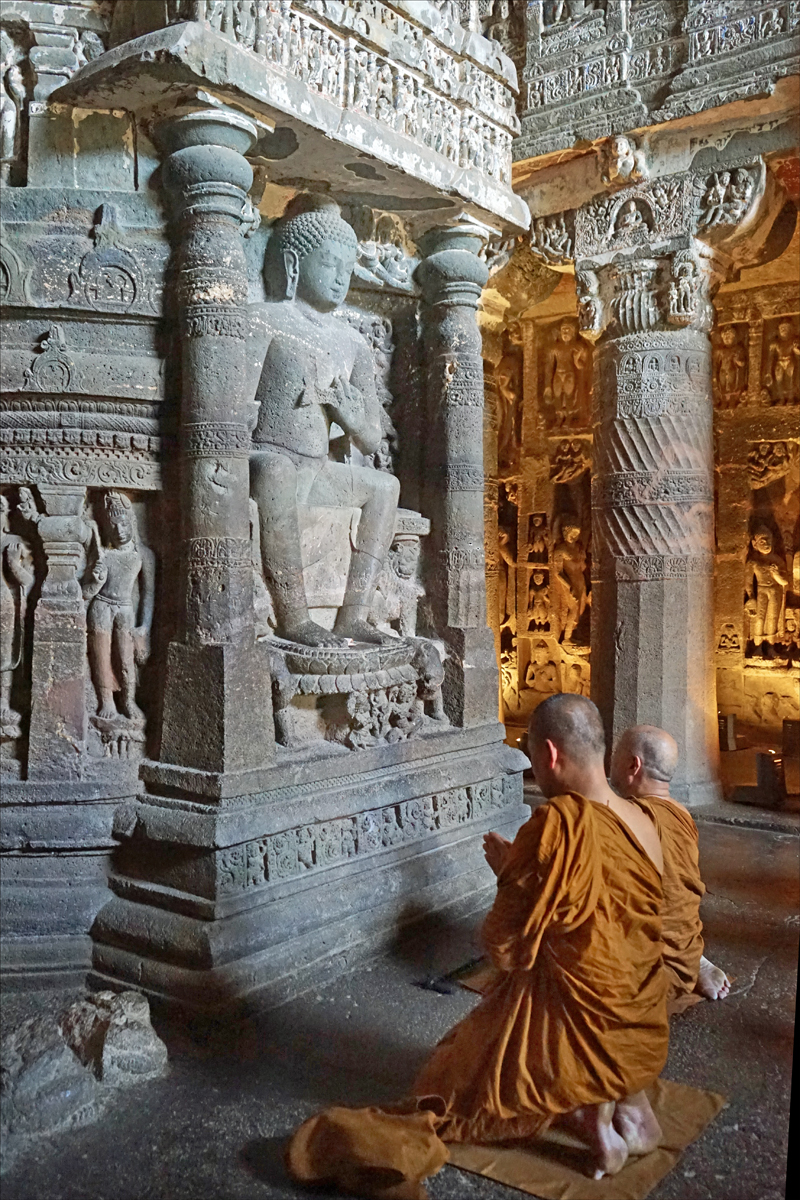
Buddhist monks worshipping in front of the Dagoba of Chaitya Cave 26

According to Spink, Harishena encouraged a group of associates, including his prime minister Varahadeva and Upendragupta, the sub-king in whose territory Ajanta was, to dig out new caves, which were individually commissioned, some containing inscriptions recording the donation. This activity began in many caves simultaneously about 462. This activity was mostly suspended in 468 because of threats from the neighbouring Asmaka kings. Thereafter work continued on only Caves 1, Harisena's own commission, and 17–20, commissioned by Upendragupta. In 472 the situation was such that work was suspended completely, in a period that Spink calls "the Hiatus", which lasted until about 475, by which time the Asmakas had replaced Upendragupta as the local rulers.

Work was then resumed, but again disrupted by Harisena's death in 477, soon after which major excavation ceased, except at cave 26, which the Asmakas were sponsoring themselves. The Asmakas launched a revolt against Harisena's son, which brought about the end of the Vakataka Dynasty. In the years 478–480 CE major excavation by important patrons was replaced by a rash of "intrusions" – statues added to existing caves, and small shrines dotted about where there was space between them. These were commissioned by less powerful individuals, some monks, who had not previously been able to make additions to the large excavations of the rulers and courtiers. They were added to the facades, the return sides of the entrances, and to walls inside the caves. According to Spink, "After 480, not a single image was ever made again at the site". However, there exists a Rashtrakuta inscription outside of cave 26 dateable to end of seventh or early 8th century, suggesting the caves were not abandoned until then.

Spink does not use "circa" in his dates, but says that "one should allow a margin of error of one year or perhaps even two in all cases".

=== Hindu and Buddhist sponsorship ===
The Ajanta Caves were built in a period when both the Buddha and the Hindu gods were simultaneously revered in Indian culture. According to Spink and other scholars, the royal Vakataka sponsors of the Ajanta Caves probably worshipped both Hindu and Buddhist gods. This is evidenced by inscriptions in which these rulers, who are otherwise known as Hindu devotees, made Buddhist dedications to the caves. According to Spink,

That one could worship both the Buddha and the Hindu gods may well account for Varahadeva's participation here, just as it can explain why the emperor Harisena himself could sponsor the remarkable Cave 1, even though most scholars agree that he was certainly a Hindu, like earlier Vakataka kings.

— Walter Spink, Ajanta: History and Development, Cave by Cave,

A terracotta plaque of Mahishasuramardini, also known as Durga, was also found in a burnt-brick vihara monastery facing the caves on the right bank of the river Waghora that has been recently excavated. This suggest that the deity was possibly under worship by the artisans. According to Yuko Yokoschi and Walter Spink, the excavated artifacts of the 5th century near the site suggest that the Ajanta caves deployed a huge number of builders.

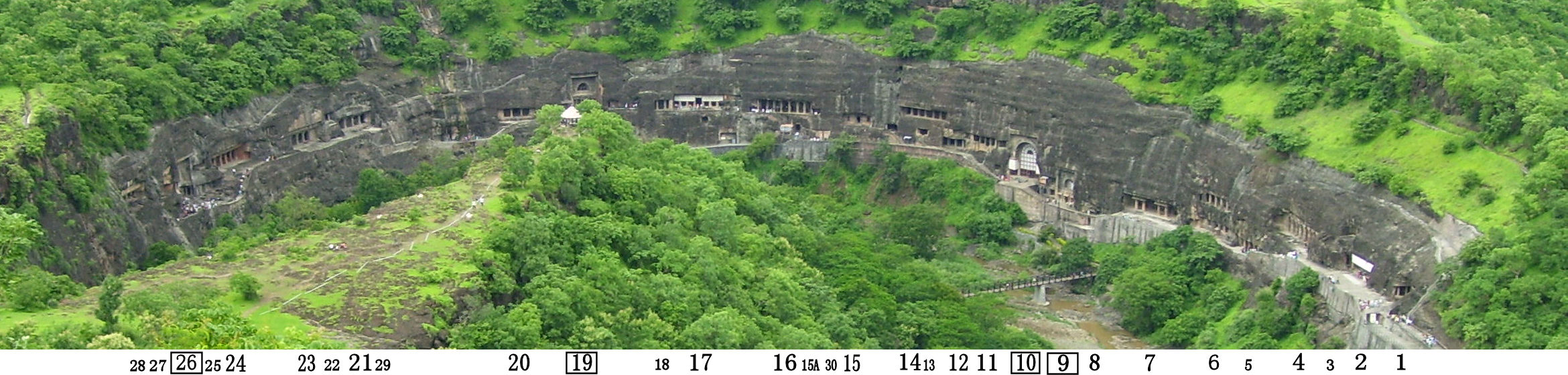
Ajanta Caves panorama with cave numbers. The caves are numbered from right to left, except for the later discovered cave 29, located high above Cave 21. Also, cave 30 is located between caves 15 and 16, nearer the river bed (cave invisible here). Chaitya halls are boxed (9, 10, 19, 26), and minor caves are indicated by a smaller type.

== Cave 1 ==
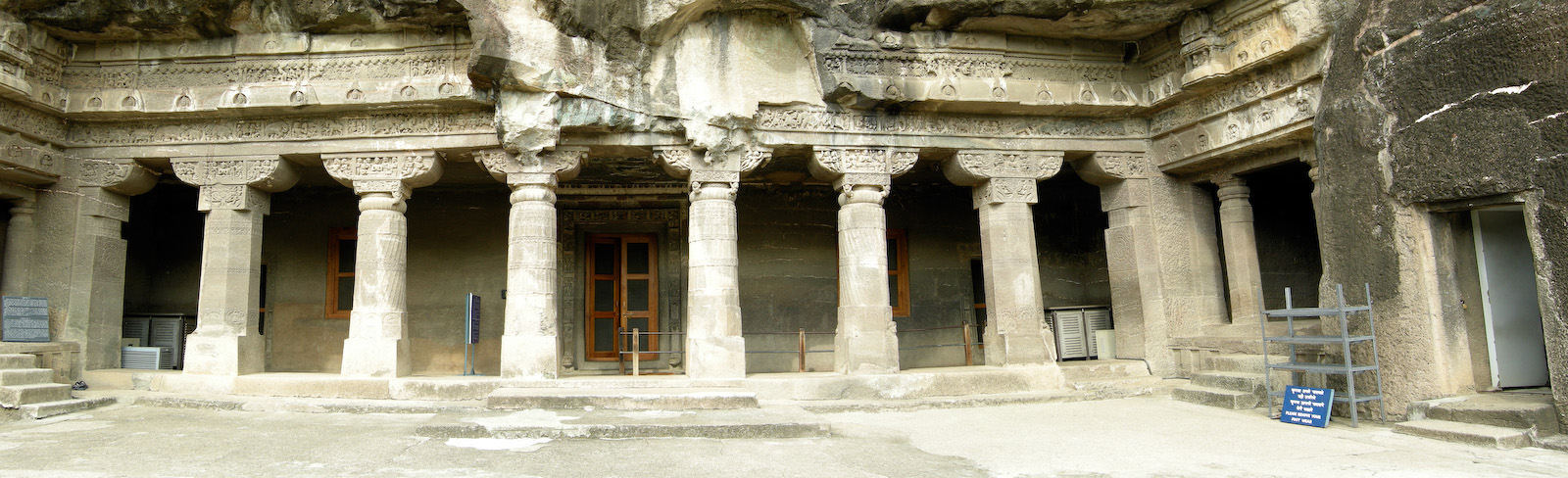
Front of Cave 1

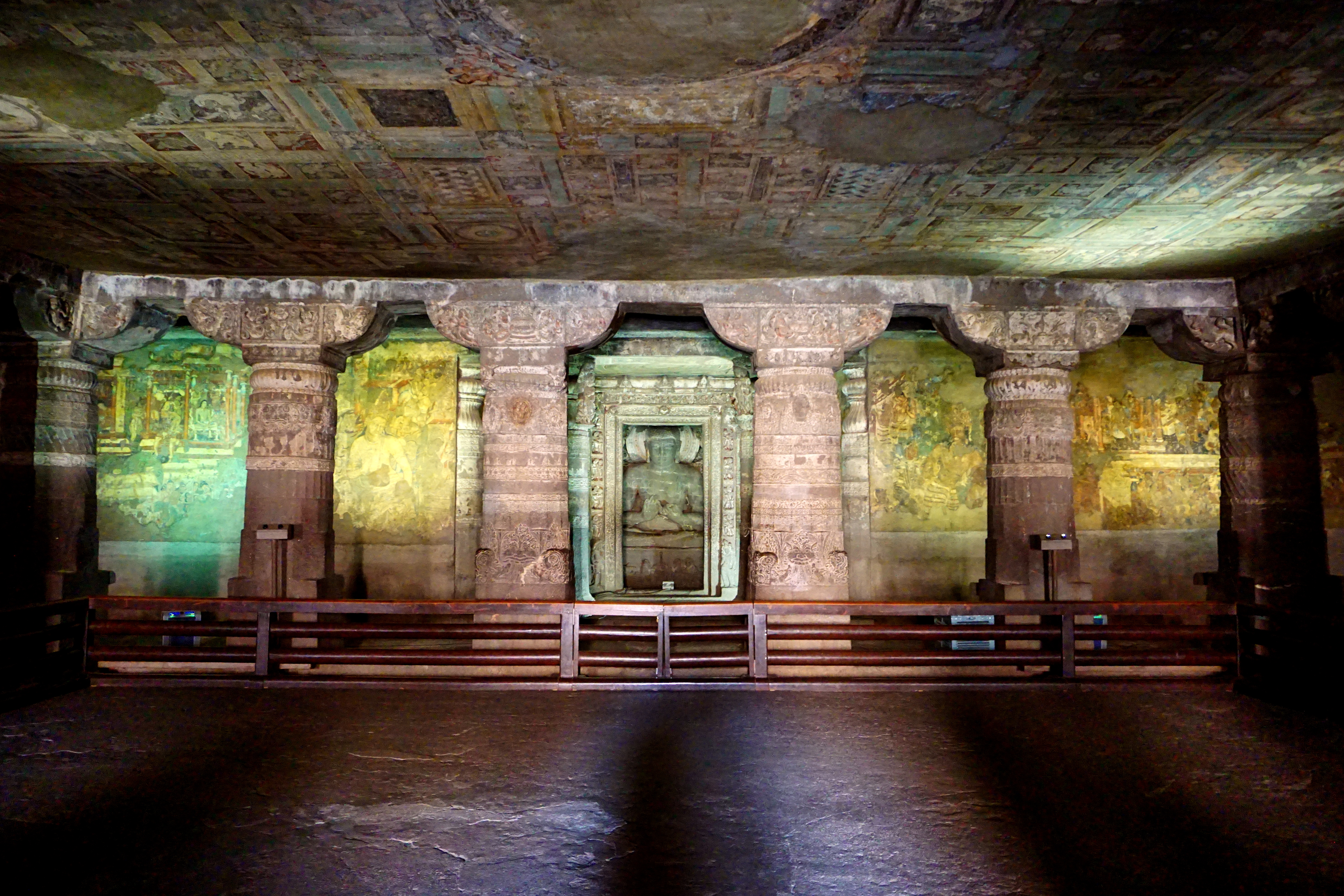
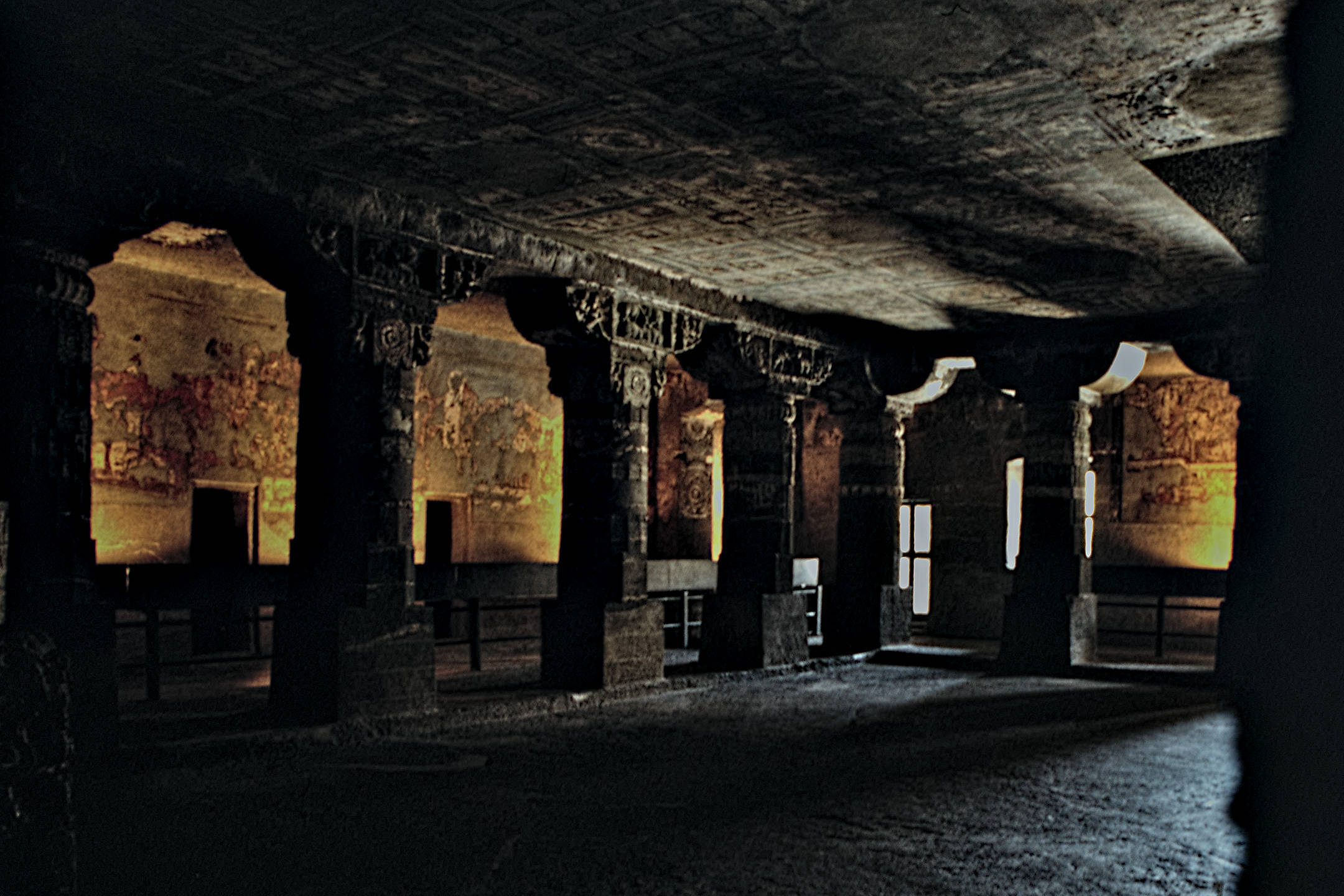
Cave 1, interior

Cave 1 was built on the eastern end of the horseshoe-shaped scarp and is now the first cave the visitor encounters. This cave, when first made, would have been in a less prominent position, right at the end of the row. According to Spink, it is one of the last caves to have been excavated, when the best sites had been taken, and was never fully inaugurated for worship by the dedication of the Buddha image in the central shrine. This is shown by the absence of sooty deposits from butter lamps on the base of the shrine image, and the lack of damage to the paintings that would have happened if the garland-hooks around the shrine had been in use for any period of time. Spink states that the Vākāṭaka Emperor Harishena was the benefactor of the work, and this is reflected in the emphasis on imagery of royalty in the cave, with those Jataka tales being selected that tell of those previous lives of the Buddha in which he was royal.

The cliff has a steeper slope here than at other caves, so to achieve a tall grand facade it was necessary to cut far back into the slope, giving a large courtyard in front of the facade. There was originally a columned portico in front of the present facade, which can be seen "half-intact in the 1880s" in pictures of the site, but this fell down completely and the remains, despite containing fine carvings, were carelessly thrown down the slope into the river and lost.

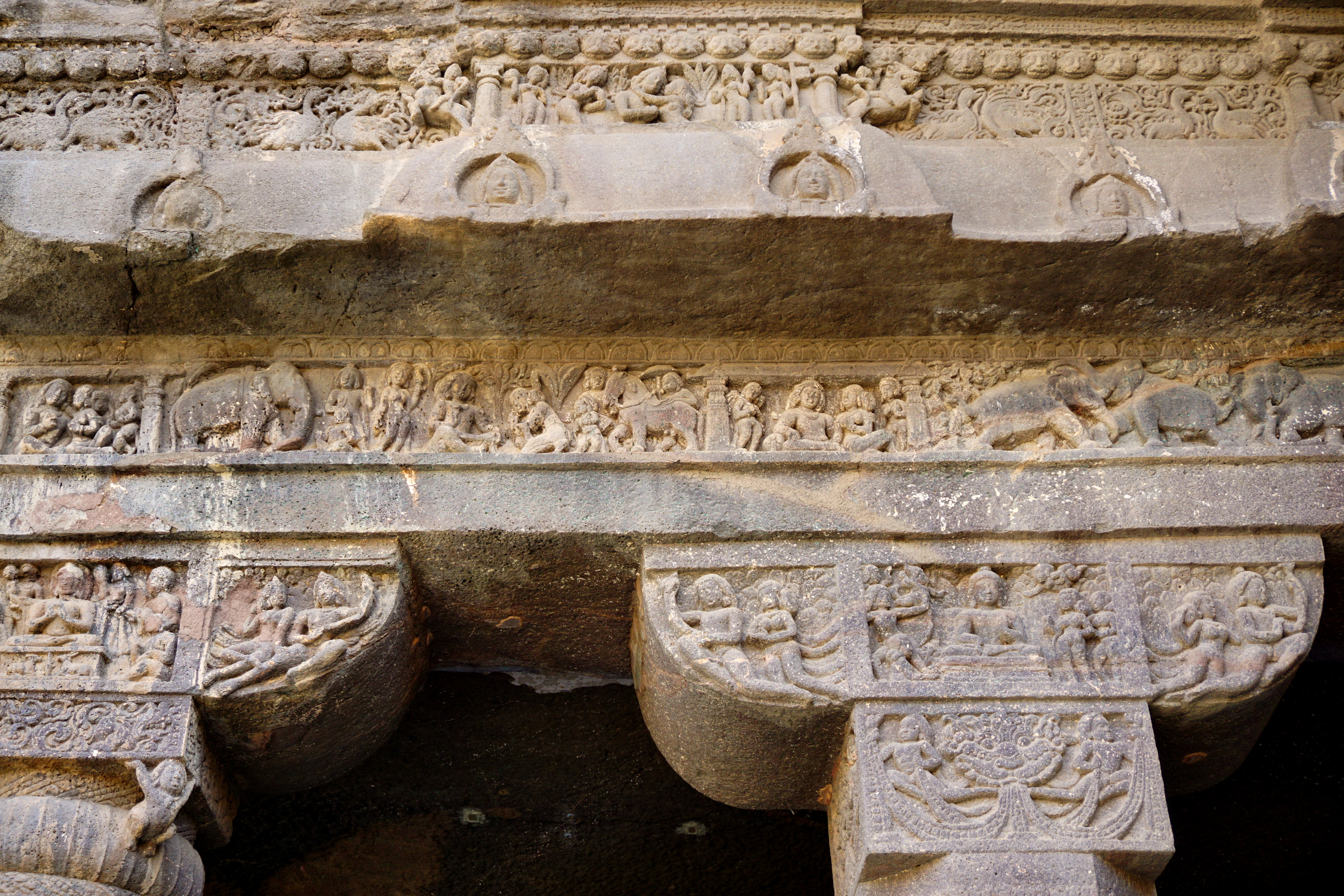
The frieze over the frontage of Cave 1 front shows elephants, horses, bulls, lions, apsaras and meditating monks.

This cave (35.7 m × 27.6 m) has one of the most elaborate carved facades, with relief sculptures on entablature and ridges, and most surfaces embellished with decorative carving. There are scenes carved from the life of the Buddha as well as a number of decorative motifs. A two-pillared portico, visible in the 19th-century photographs, has since perished. The cave has a forecourt with cells fronted by pillared vestibules on either side. These have a high plinth level. The cave has a porch with simple cells at both ends. The absence of pillared vestibules on the ends suggests that the porch was not excavated in the latest phase of Ajanta when pillared vestibules had become customary. Most areas of the porch were once covered with murals, of which many fragments remain, especially on the ceiling. There are three doorways: a central doorway and two side doorways. Two square windows were carved between the doorways to brighten the interiors.

Each wall of the hall inside is nearly 40 feet (12 m) long and 20 feet (6.1 m) high. Twelve pillars make a square colonnade inside, supporting the ceiling and creating spacious aisles along the walls. There is a shrine carved on the rear wall to house an impressive seated image of the Buddha, his hands being in the Dhammacakkappavattana mudra. There are four cells on each of the left, rear, and the right walls, though due to rock fault there are none at the ends of the rear aisle.

The paintings of Cave 1 cover the walls and the ceilings. They are in a fair state of preservation, although the full scheme was never completed. The scenes depicted are mostly didactic, devotional, and ornamental, with scenes from the Jataka stories of the Buddha's former lives as a bodhisattva, the life of the Gautama Buddha, and those of his veneration. The two most famous individual painted images at Ajanta are the two over-lifesize figures of the protective bodhisattvas Padmapani and Vajrapani on either side of the entrance to the Buddha shrine on the wall of the rear aisle (see illustrations above). Other significant frescoes in Cave 1 include the Sibi, Sankhapala, Mahajanaka, Mahaummagga, and Champeyya Jataka tales. The cave-paintings also show the Temptation of Mara, the miracle of Sravasti where the Buddha simultaneously manifests in many forms, the story of Nanda, and the story of Siddhartha and Yasodhara.

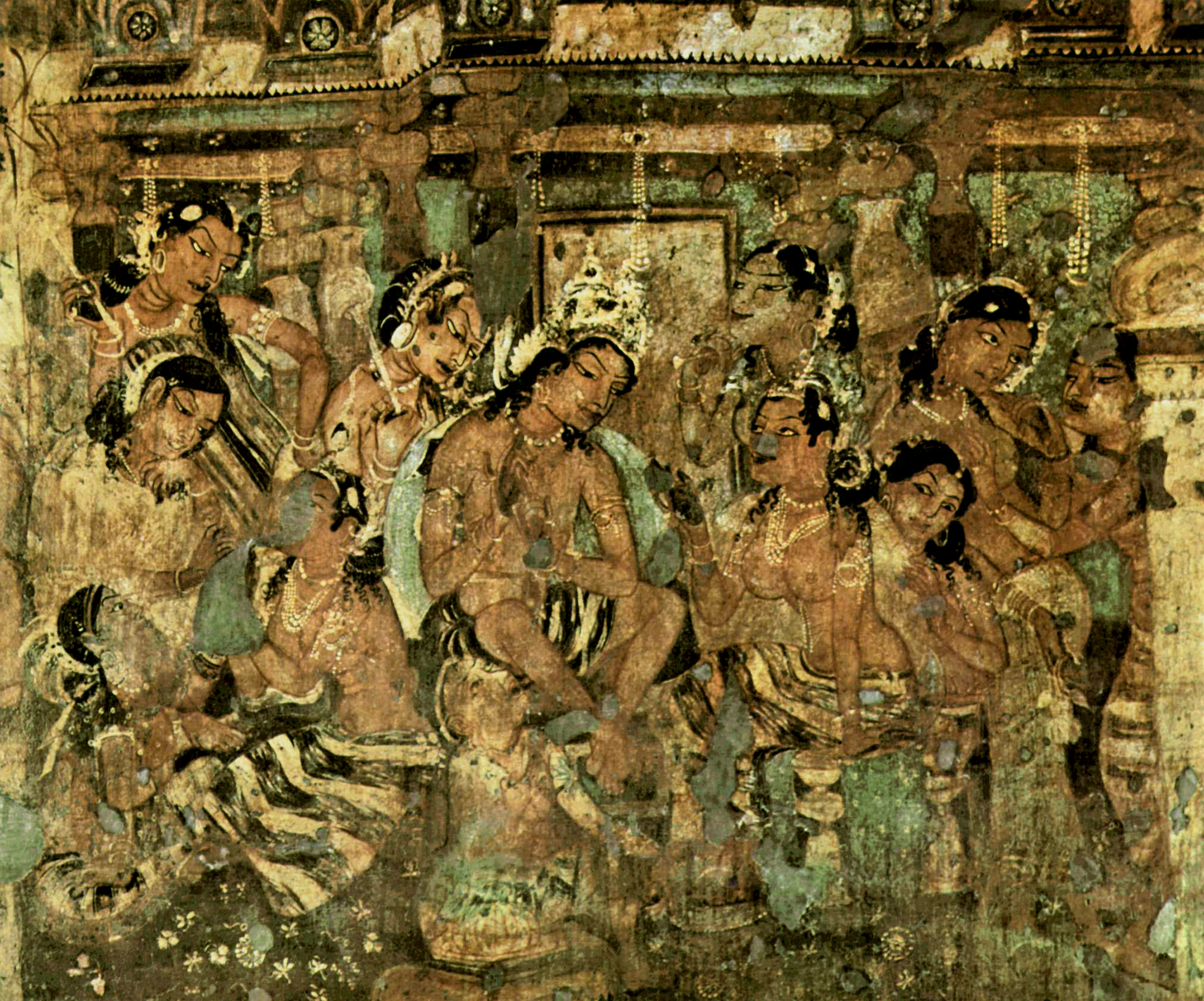
One of four frescoes for the Mahajanaka Jataka tale: the king announces his abdication to become an ascetic.

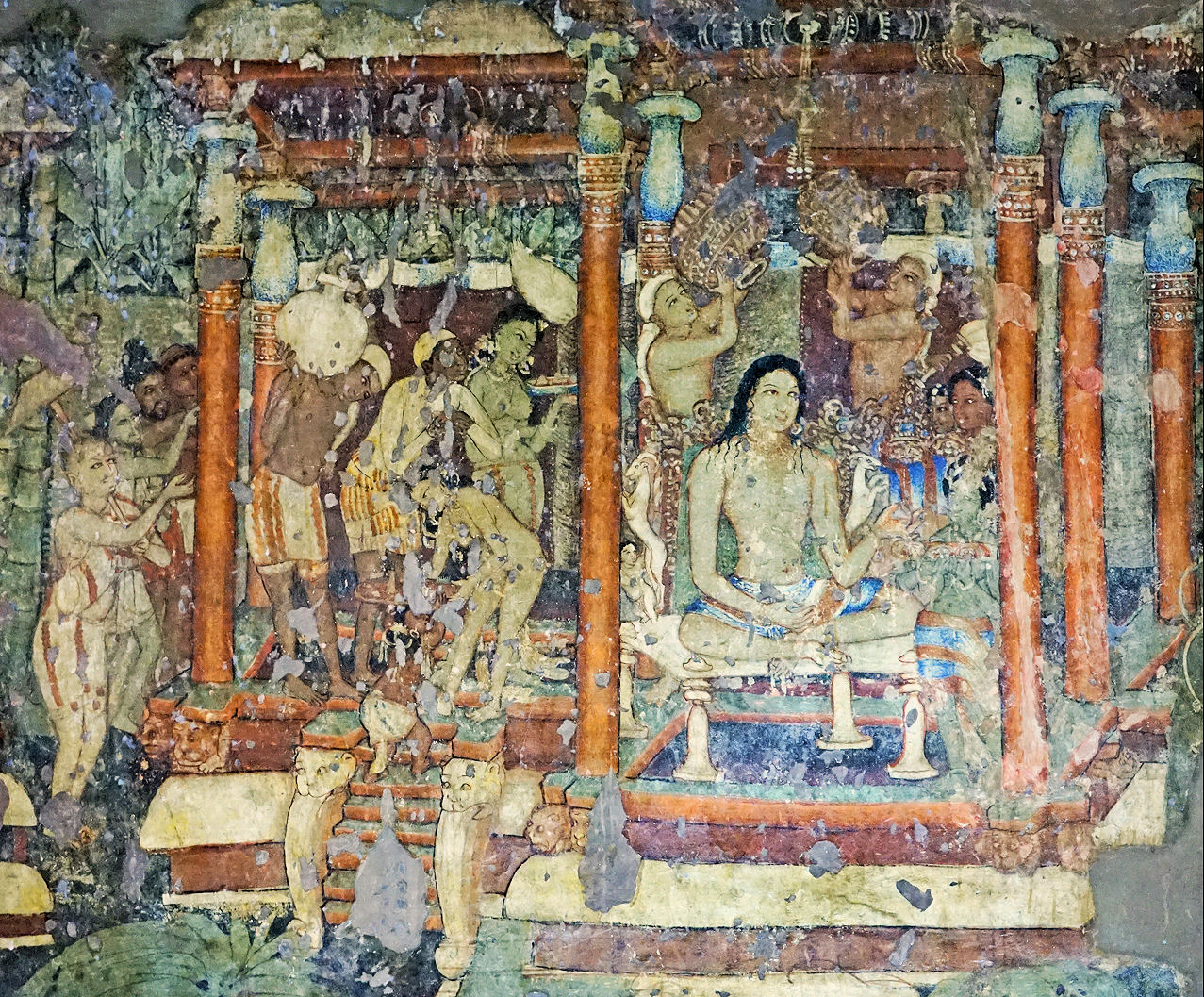
Sibi Jataka: the king undergoes the traditional rituals for renunciants. He receives a ceremonial bath.

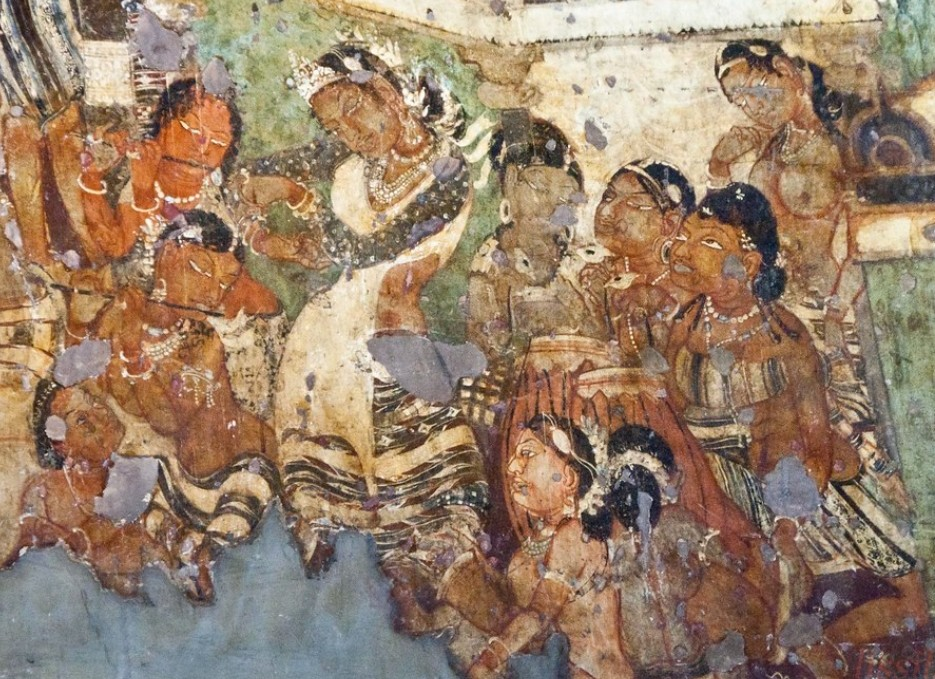
Painting of a dancing girl at Ajanta cave 1

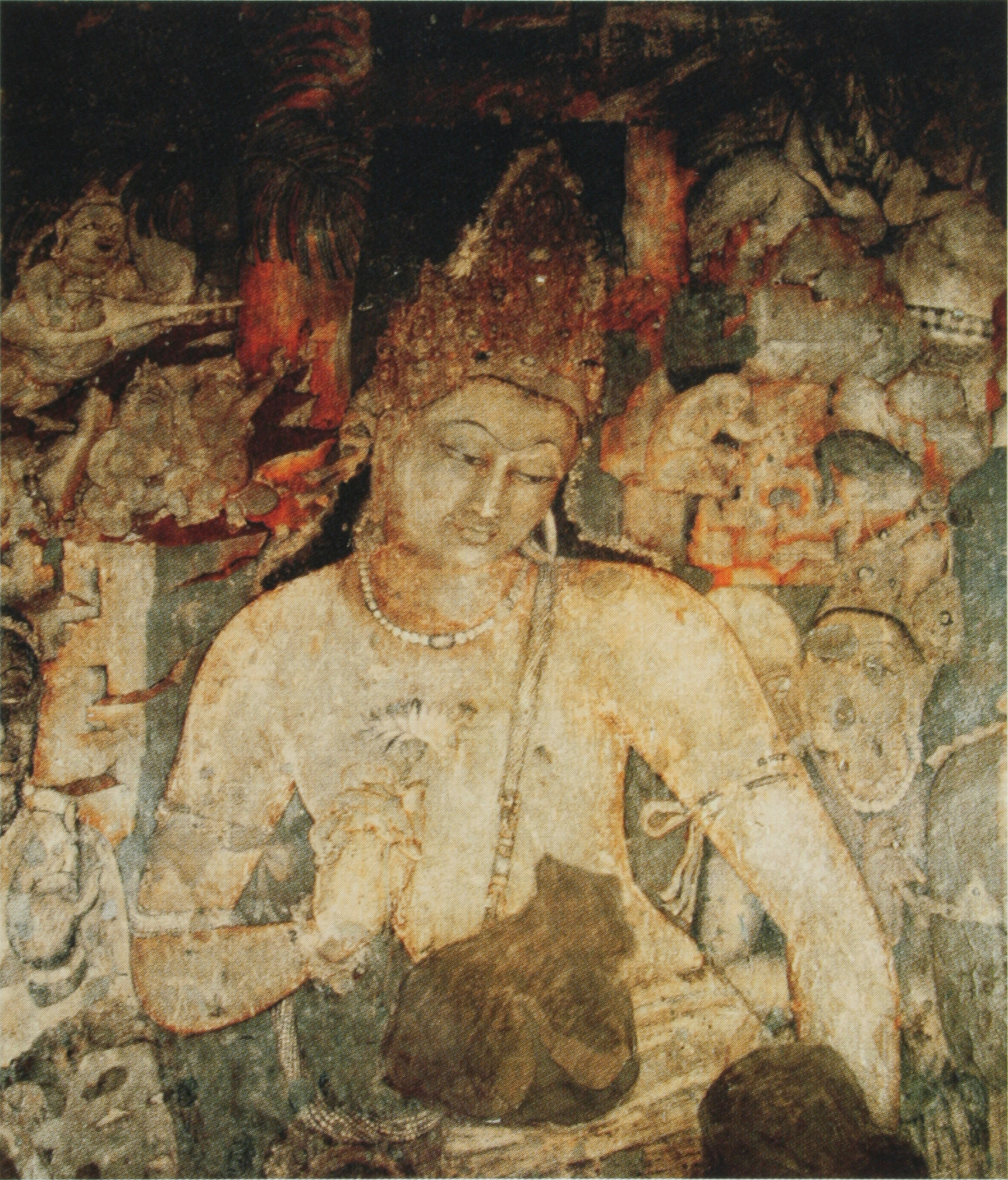
The Bodhisattva of compassion Padmapani with lotus

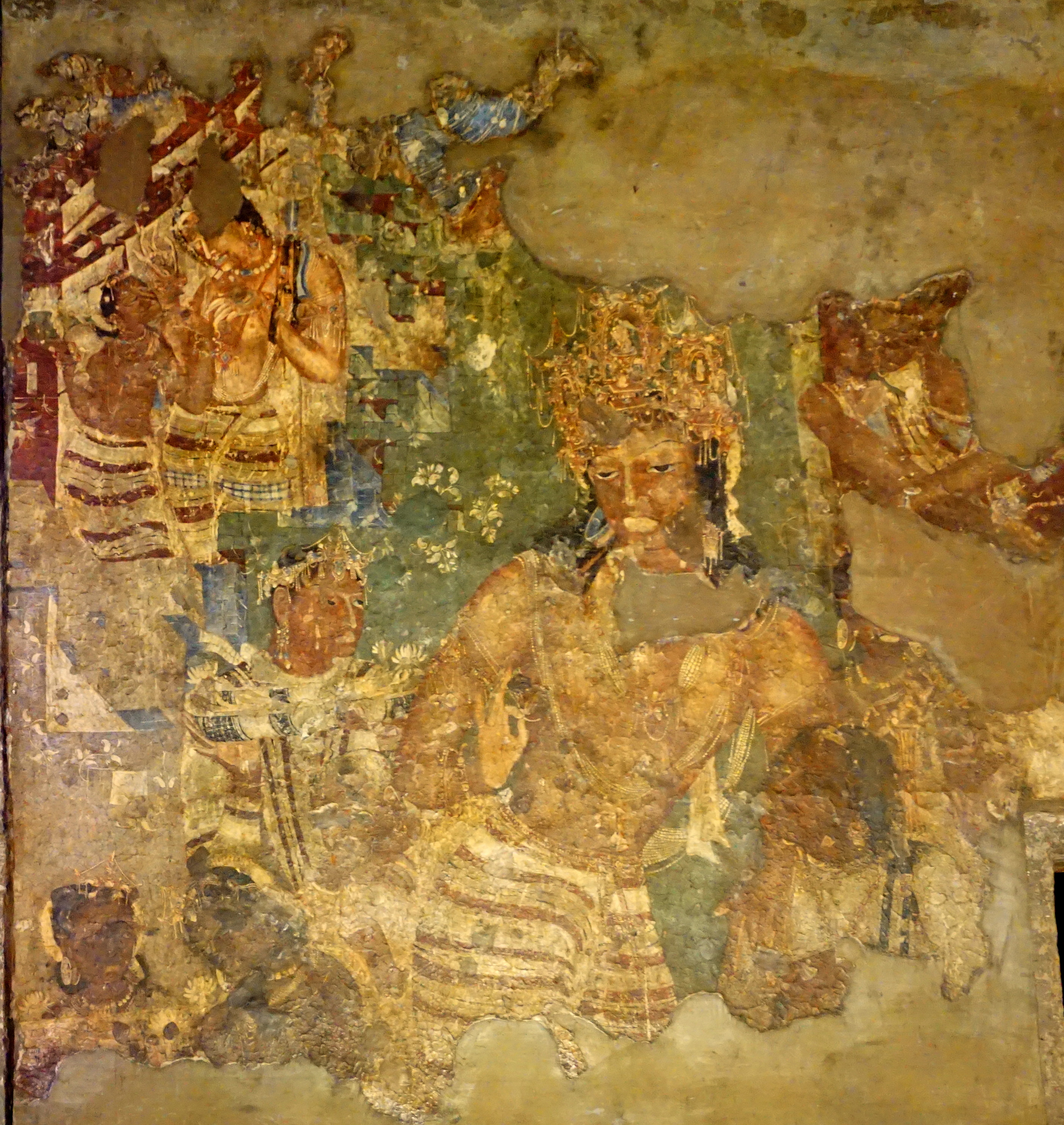
The Vajrapani

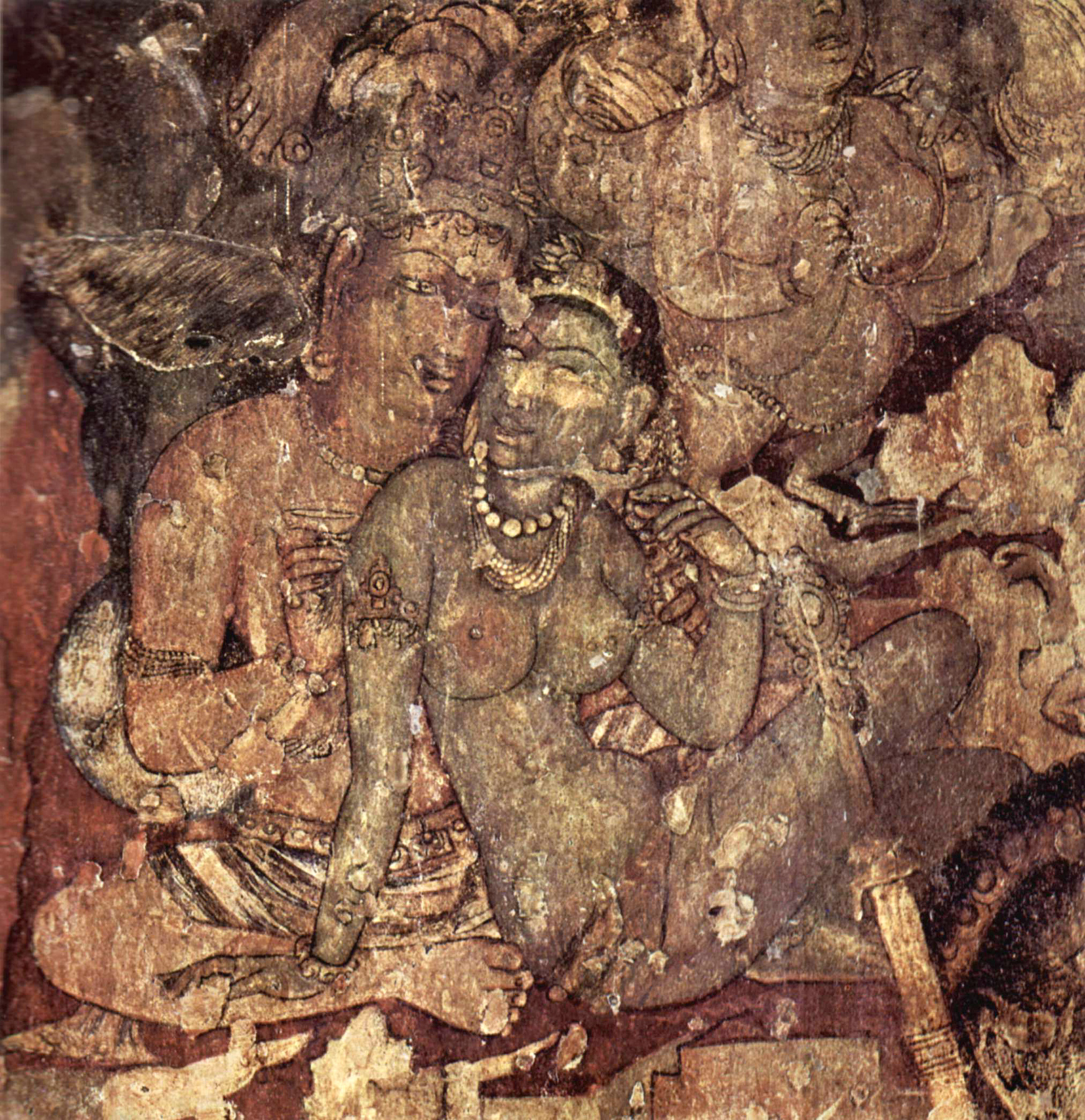
Princely couple

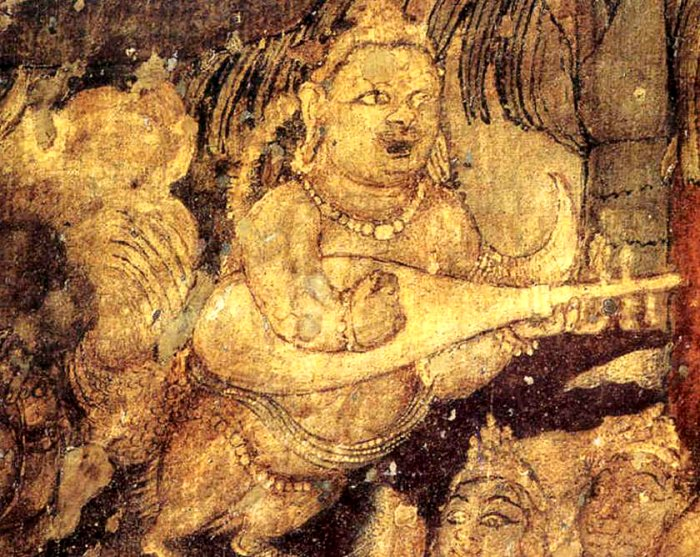
Kinnara with kachchapa veena, part of Bodhisattva Padmapani painting in Cave 1.

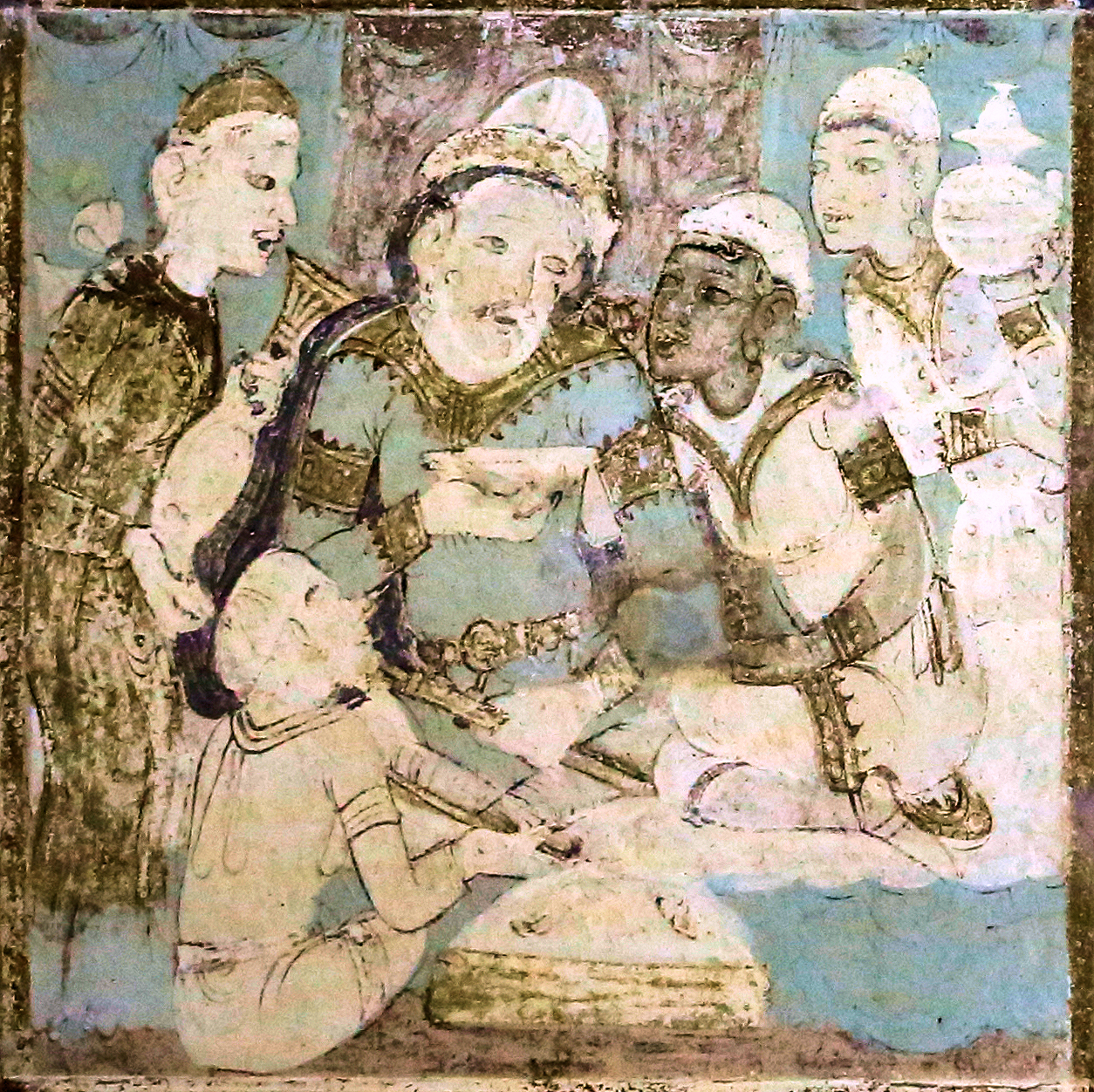
Ajanta Cave 1 Group of foreigners on the ceiling

== Cave 2 ==
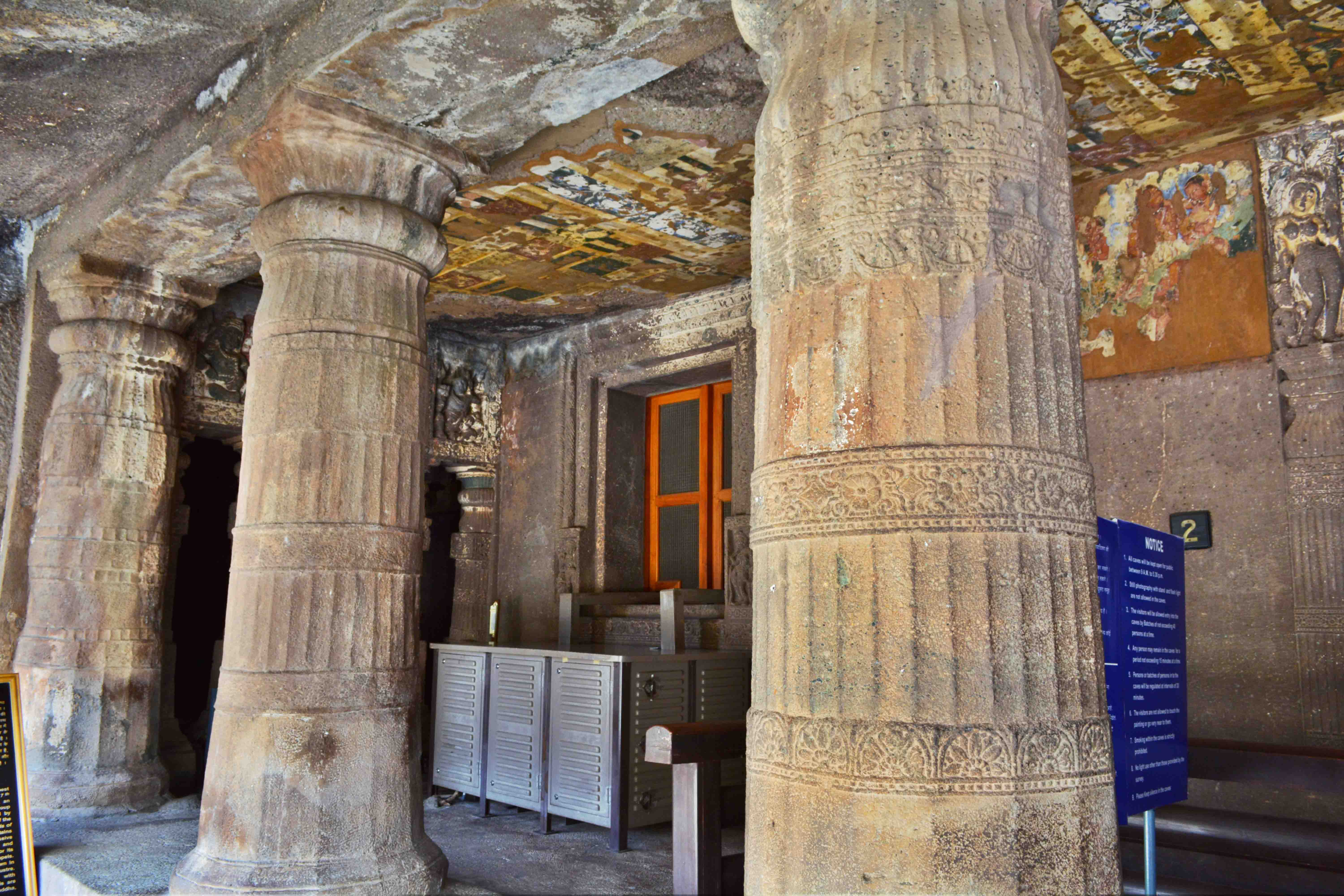
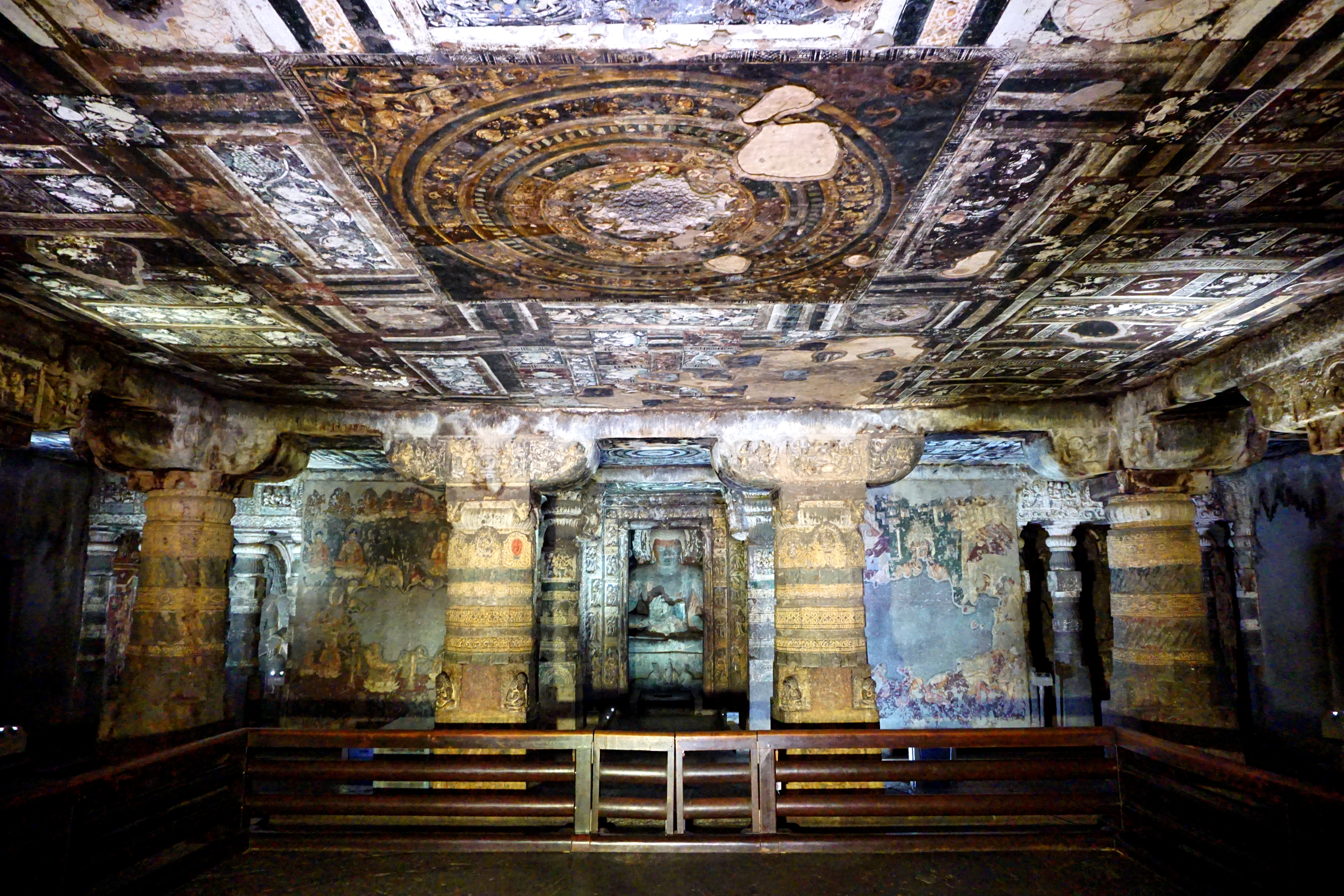
Outside view and main hall with shrine, Cave 2.

Cave 2, adjacent to Cave 1, is known for the paintings that have been preserved on its walls, ceilings, and pillars. It looks similar to Cave 1 and is in a better state of preservation. This cave is best known for its feminine focus, intricate rock carvings and paint artwork yet it is incomplete and lacks consistency. One of the 5th-century frescos in this cave also shows children at a school, with those in the front rows paying attention to the teacher, while those in the back row are shown distracted and acting.

Cave 2 (35.7 m × 21.6 m) was started in the 460s, but mostly carved between 475 and 477 CE, probably sponsored and influenced by a woman closely related to emperor Harisena. It has a porch quite different from Cave 1. Even the façade carvings seem to be different. The cave is supported by robust pillars, ornamented with designs. The front porch consists of cells supported by pillared vestibules on both ends.

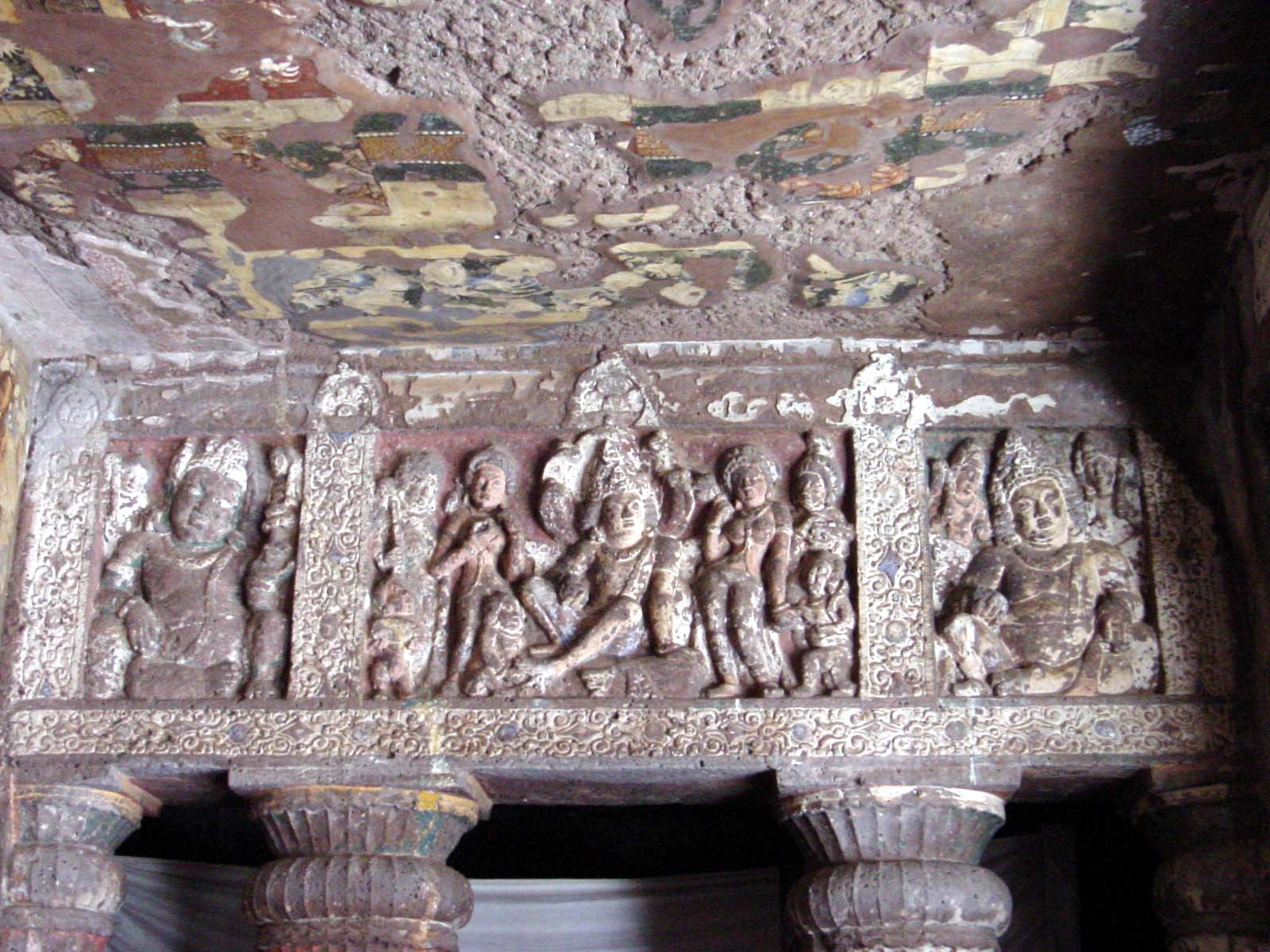
Colonnades with high-reliefs in the veranda

The hall has four colonnades which are supporting the ceiling and surrounding a square in the center of the hall. Each arm or colonnade of the square is parallel to the respective walls of the hall, making an aisle in between. The colonnades have rock-beams above and below them. The capitals are carved and painted with various decorative themes that include ornamental, human, animal, vegetative, and semi-divine motifs. Major carvings include that of goddess Hariti. She is a Buddhist deity who originally was the demoness of smallpox and a child eater, who the Buddha converted into a guardian goddess of fertility, easy child birth and one who protects babies.

The paintings on the ceilings and walls of Cave 2 have been widely published. They depict the Hamsa, Vidhurapandita, Ruru, Kshanti Jataka tales and the Purna Avadhana. Other frescos show the miracle of Sravasti, Ashtabhaya Avalokitesvara and the dream of Maya. Just as the stories illustrated in cave 1 emphasise kingship, those in cave 2 show many noble and powerful women in prominent roles, leading to suggestions that the patron was an unknown woman. The porch's rear wall has a doorway in the center, which allows entrance to the hall. On either side of the door is a square-shaped window to brighten the interior.

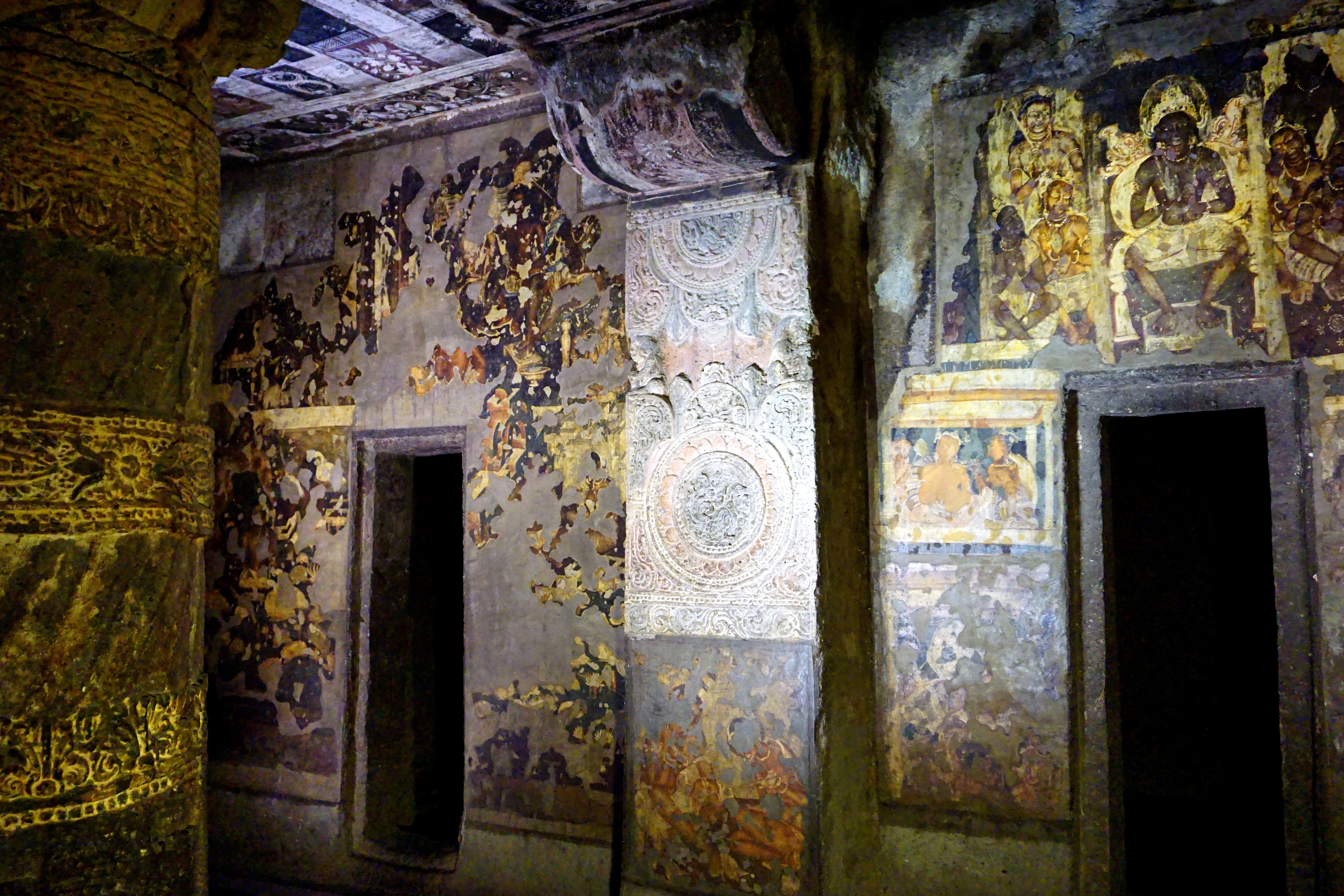
Cave 2 fresco above the right door shows Buddha in Tushita heaven

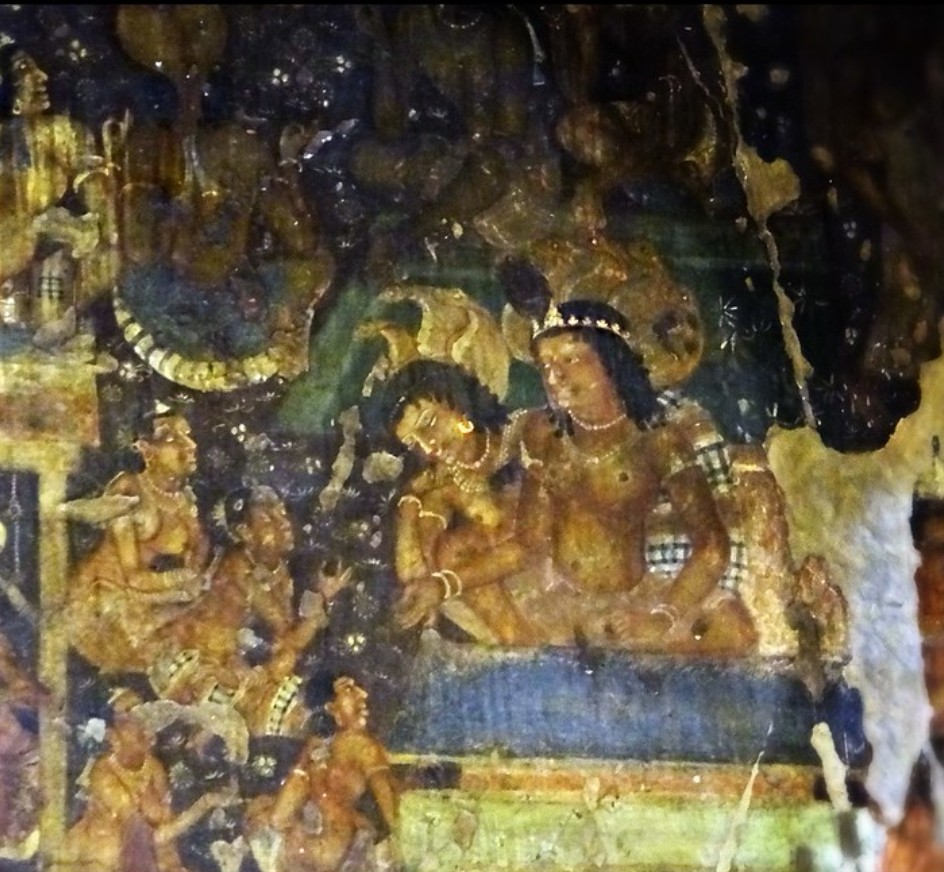
Scene from Vidurapandita Jataka at cave 2

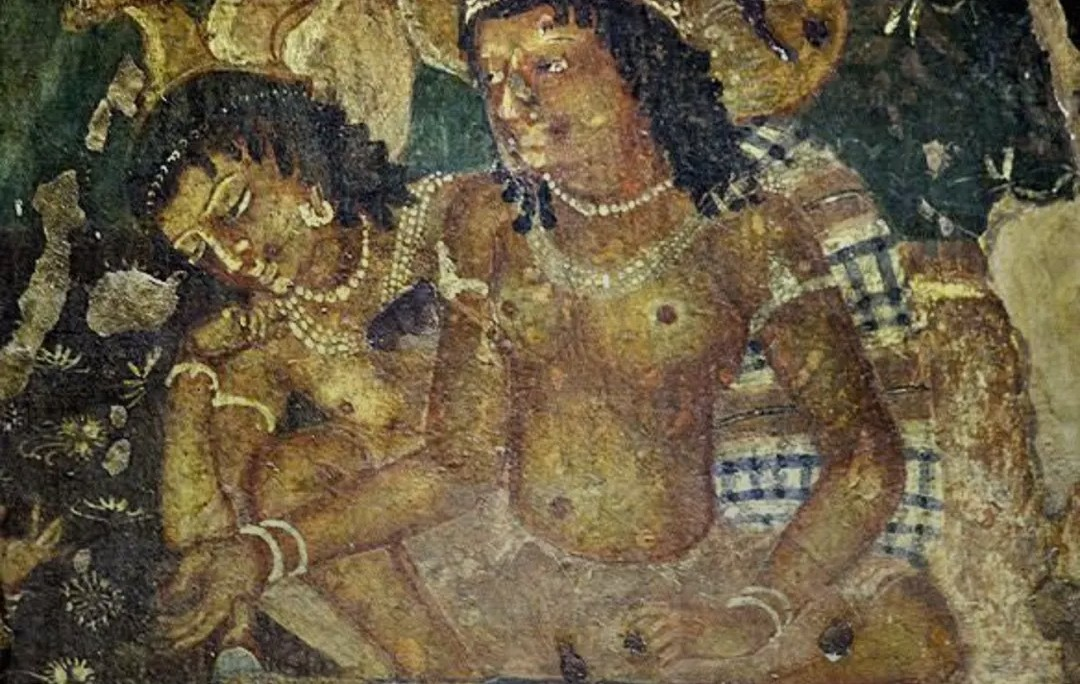
Close-up

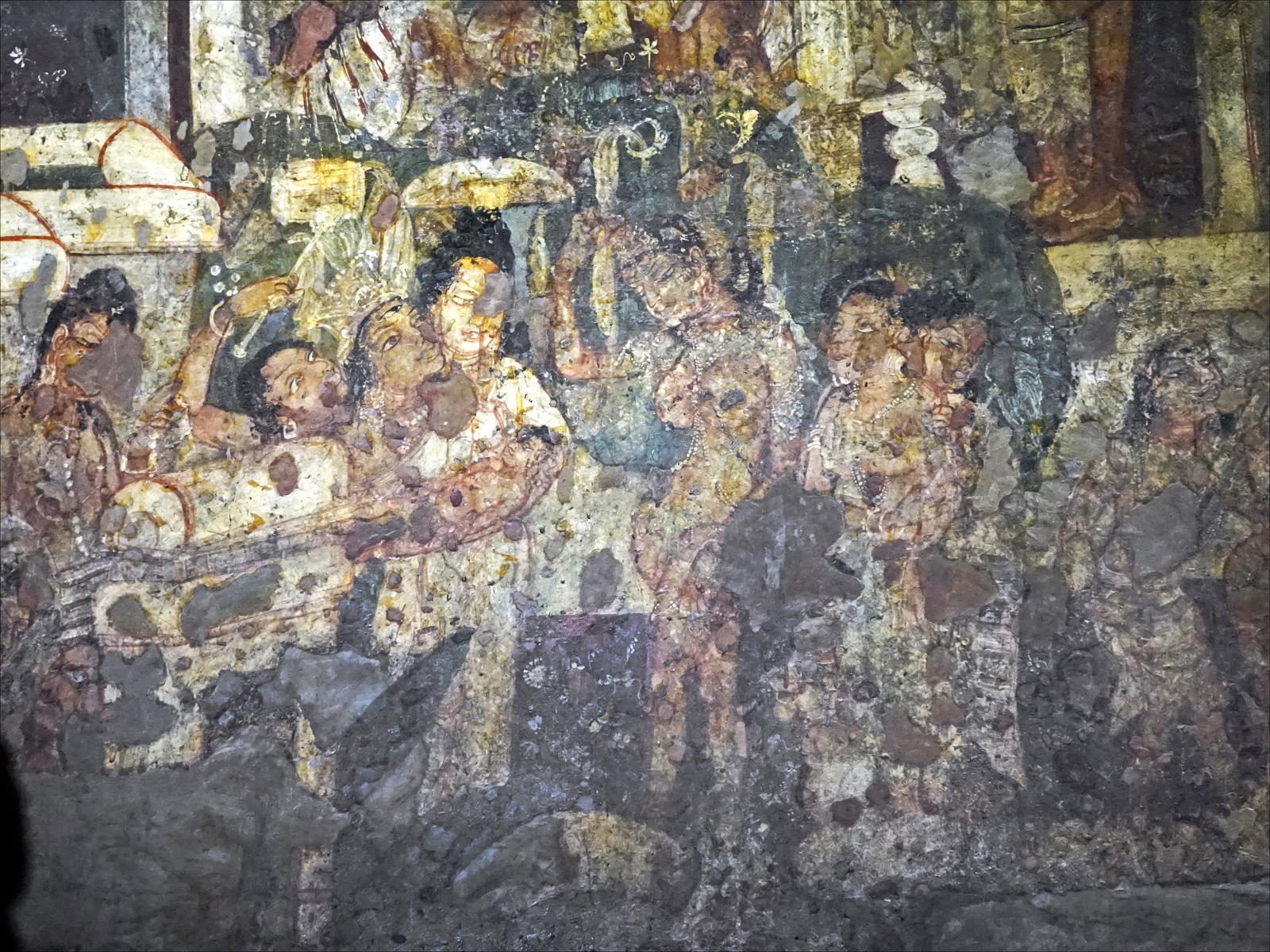
A scene from Vidurapandita Jataka: the birth of the Buddha

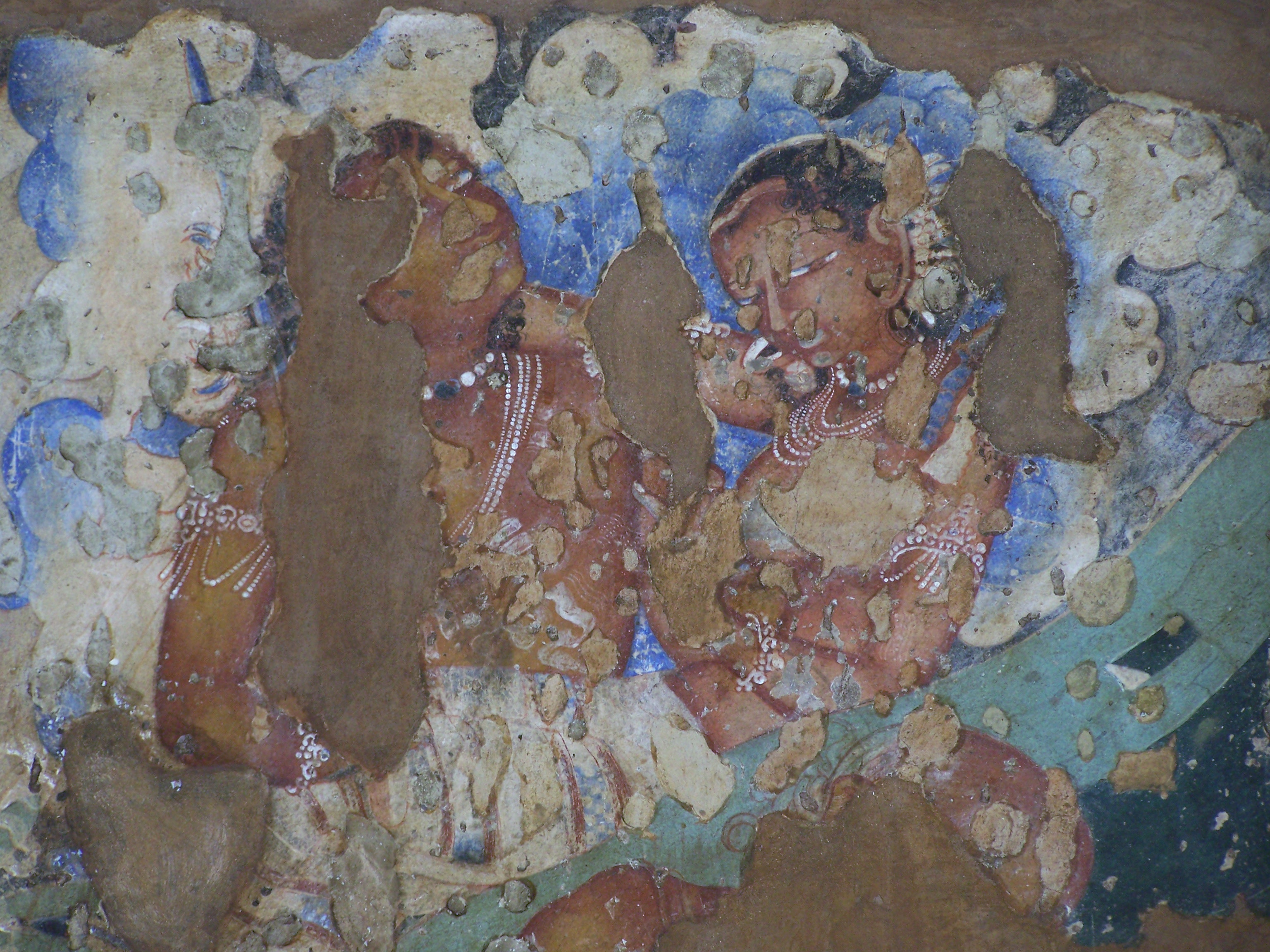
The artworks of Cave 2 are known for their feminine focus, such as these two females

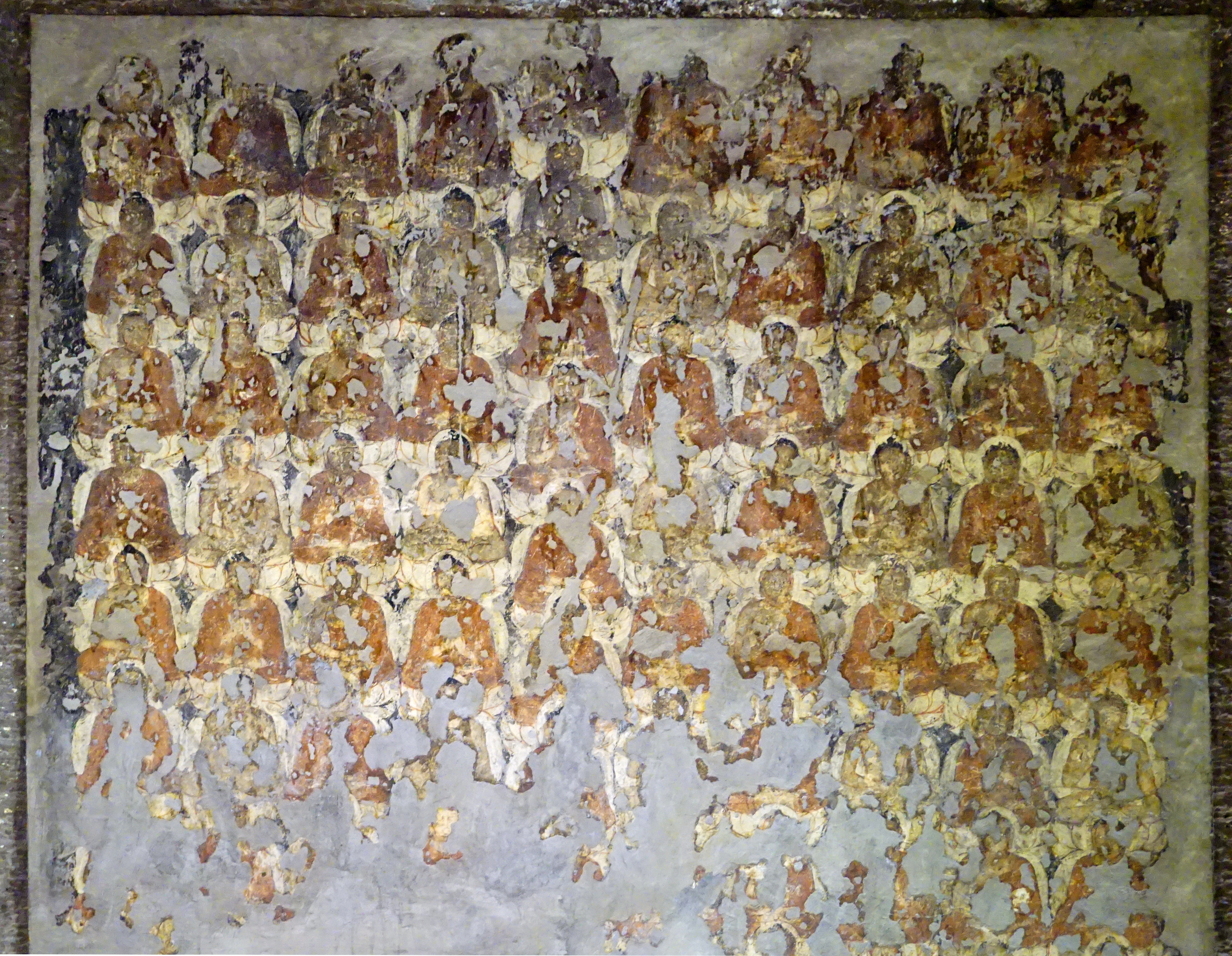
The Miracle of Sravasti

== Cave 3 ==
Cave 3 is merely a start of an excavation; according to Spink it was begun right at the end of the final period of work and soon abandoned.

This is an incomplete monastery and only the preliminary excavations of pillared veranda exist. The cave was one of the last projects to start at the site. Its date could be ascribed to circa 477 CE, just before the sudden death of Emperor Harisena. The work stopped after the scooping out of a rough entrance of the hall.

== Cave 4 ==
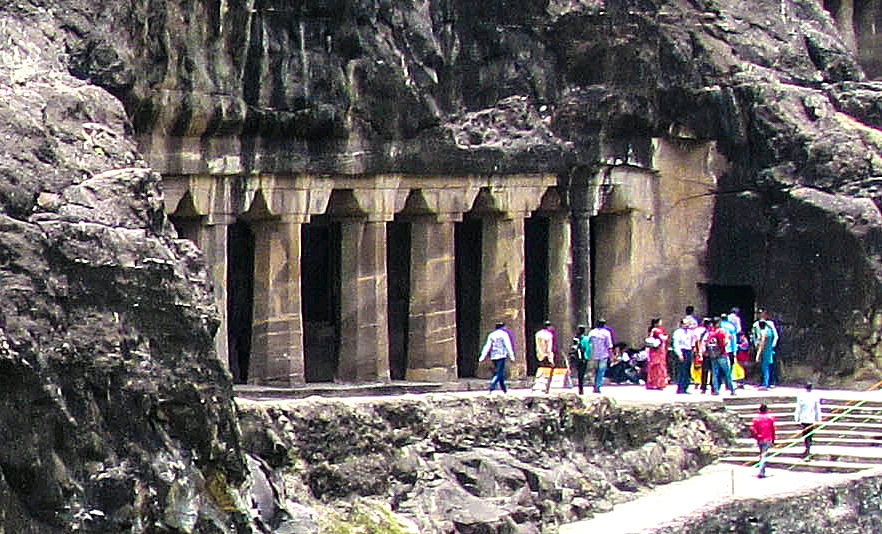
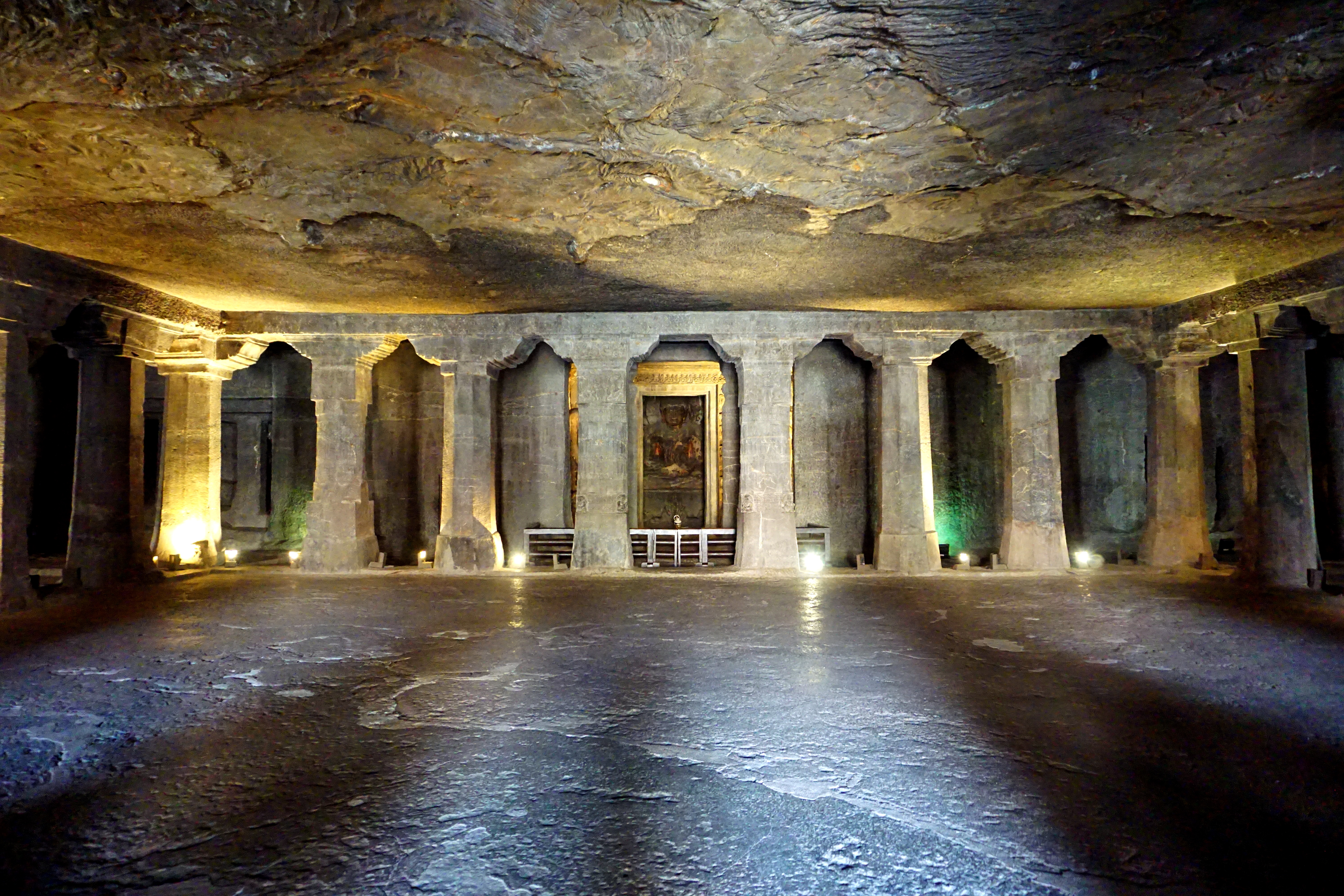
Exterior view and interior hall of Cave 4

Cave 4, a Vihara, was sponsored by Mathura, likely not a noble or courtly official, rather a wealthy devotee. This is the largest vihara in the inaugural group, which suggests he had immense wealth and influence without being a state official. It is placed at a significantly higher level, possibly because the artists realized that the rock quality at the lower and same level of other caves was poor and they had a better chance of a major vihara at an upper location. Another likely possibility is that the planners wanted to carve into the rock another large cistern to the left courtside for more residents, mirroring the right, a plan implied by the height of the forward cells on the left side.

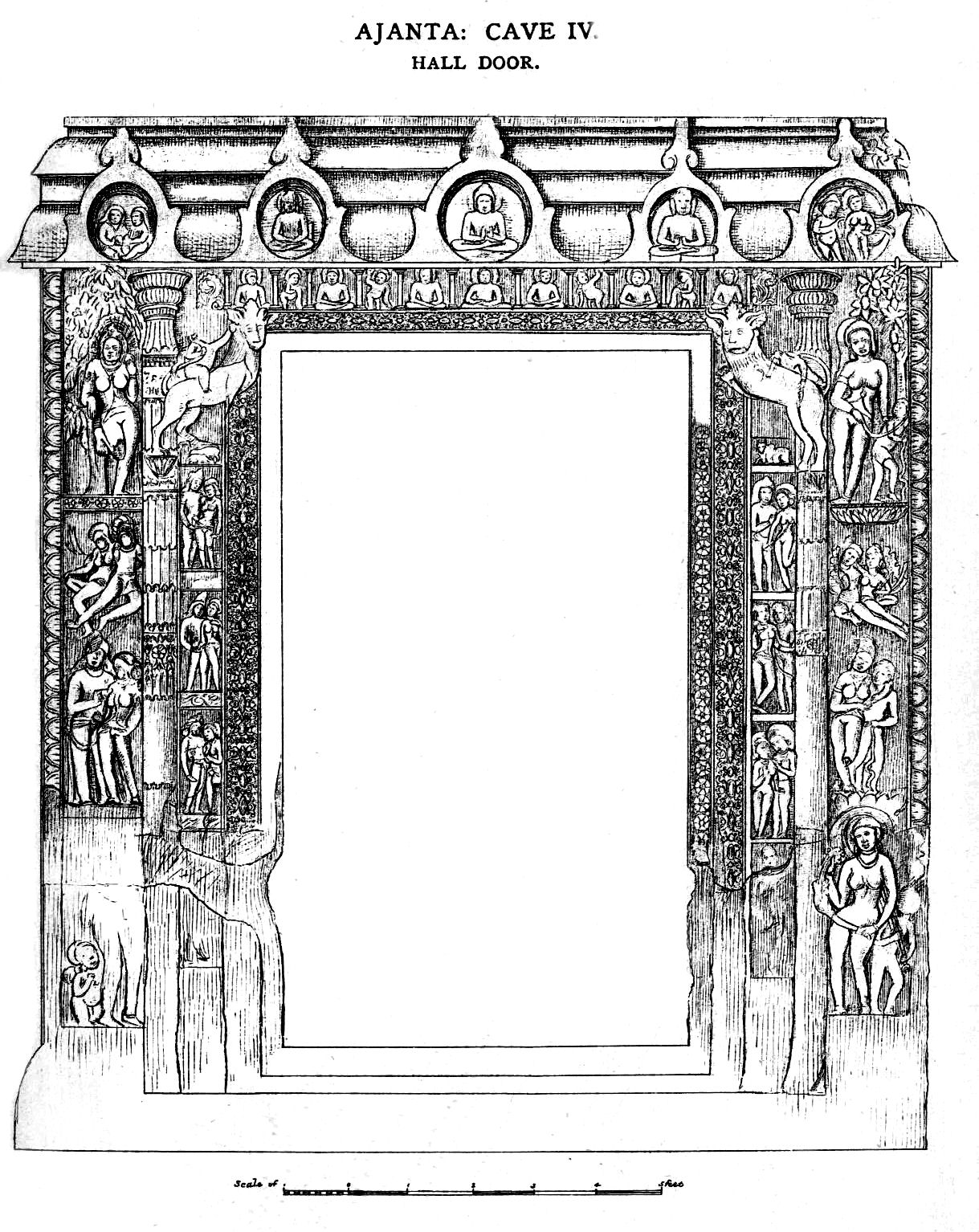
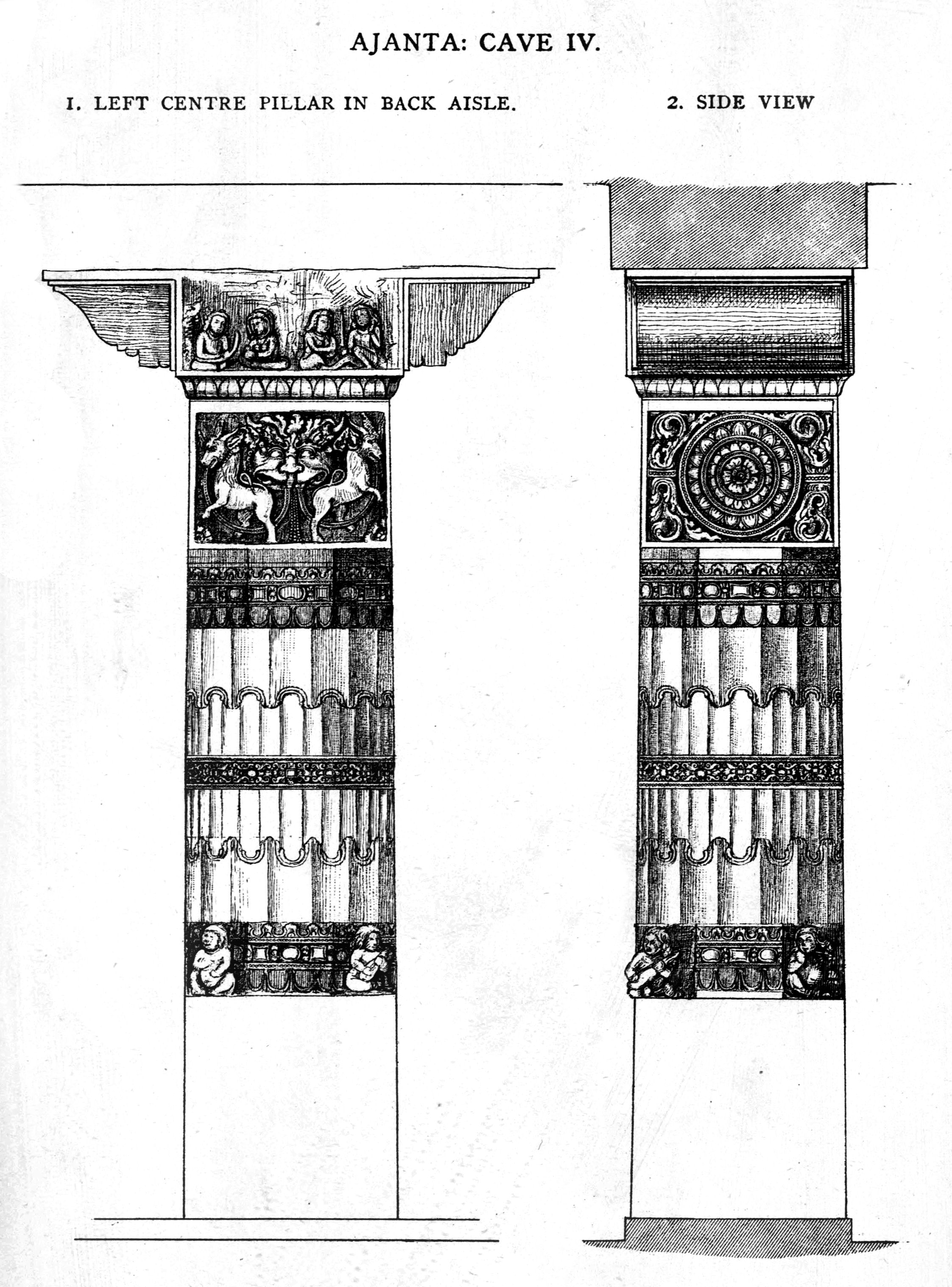
Ajanta hall door (left) and cave pillars

The Archaeological Survey of India dates it to the 6th century CE. Spink, in contrast, dates this cave's inauguration a century earlier, to about 463 CE, based on construction style and other inscriptions. Cave 4 shows evidence of a dramatic collapse of its ceiling in the central hall, likely in the 6th century, something caused by the vastness of the cave and geological flaws in the rock. Later, the artists attempted to overcome this geological flaw by raising the height of the ceiling through deeper excavation of the embedded basalt lava.

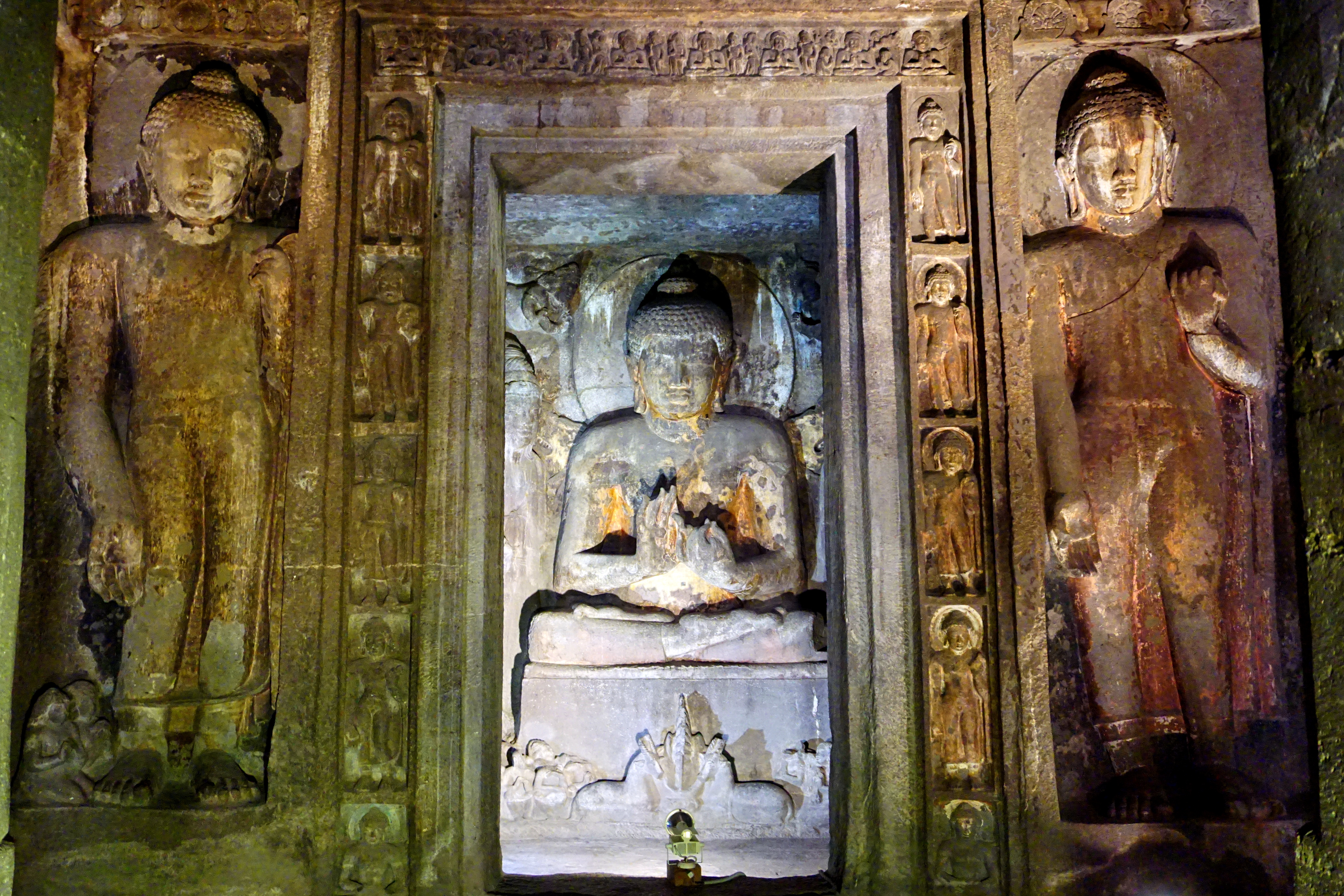
Cave 4: The Buddha in a preaching pose flanked by bodhisattvas

The cave has a squarish plan, houses a colossal image of the Buddha in preaching pose flanked by bodhisattvas and celestial nymphs hovering above. It consists, of a verandah, a hypostylar hall, sanctum with an antechamber and a series of unfinished cells. This monastery is the largest among the Ajanta caves and it measures nearly 970 square metres (10,400 sq ft) (35 m × 28 m). The door frame is exquisitely sculpted flanking to the right is carved Bodhisattva as reliever of Eight Great Perils. The rear wall of the veranda contains the panel of litany of Avalokiteśvara. The cave's ceiling collapse likely affected its overall plan, caused it being left incomplete. Only the Buddha's statue and the major sculptures were completed, and except for what the sponsor considered most important elements all other elements inside the cave were never painted.

== Cave 5 ==
Cave 5, an unfinished excavation, was planned as a monastery (10.32 × 16.8 m). Cave 5 is devoid of sculpture and architectural elements except the door frame. The ornate carvings on the frame has female figures with mythical makara creatures found in ancient and medieval-era Indian arts. The cave's construction was likely initiated about 465 CE but abandoned because the rock has geological flaws. The construction was resumed in 475 CE after Asmakas restarted work at the Ajanta caves, but abandoned again as the artists and sponsor redesigned and focussed on an expanded Cave 6 that abuts Cave 5.

== Cave 6 ==
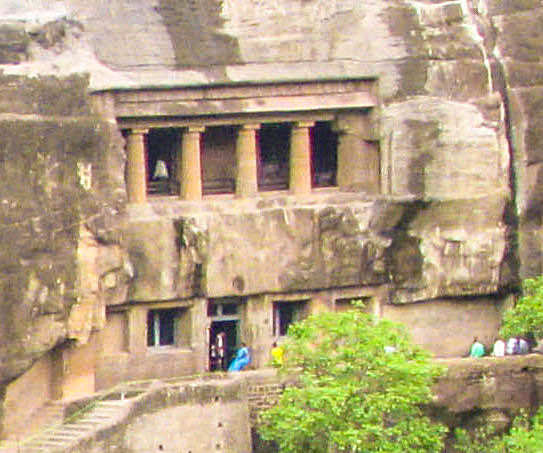
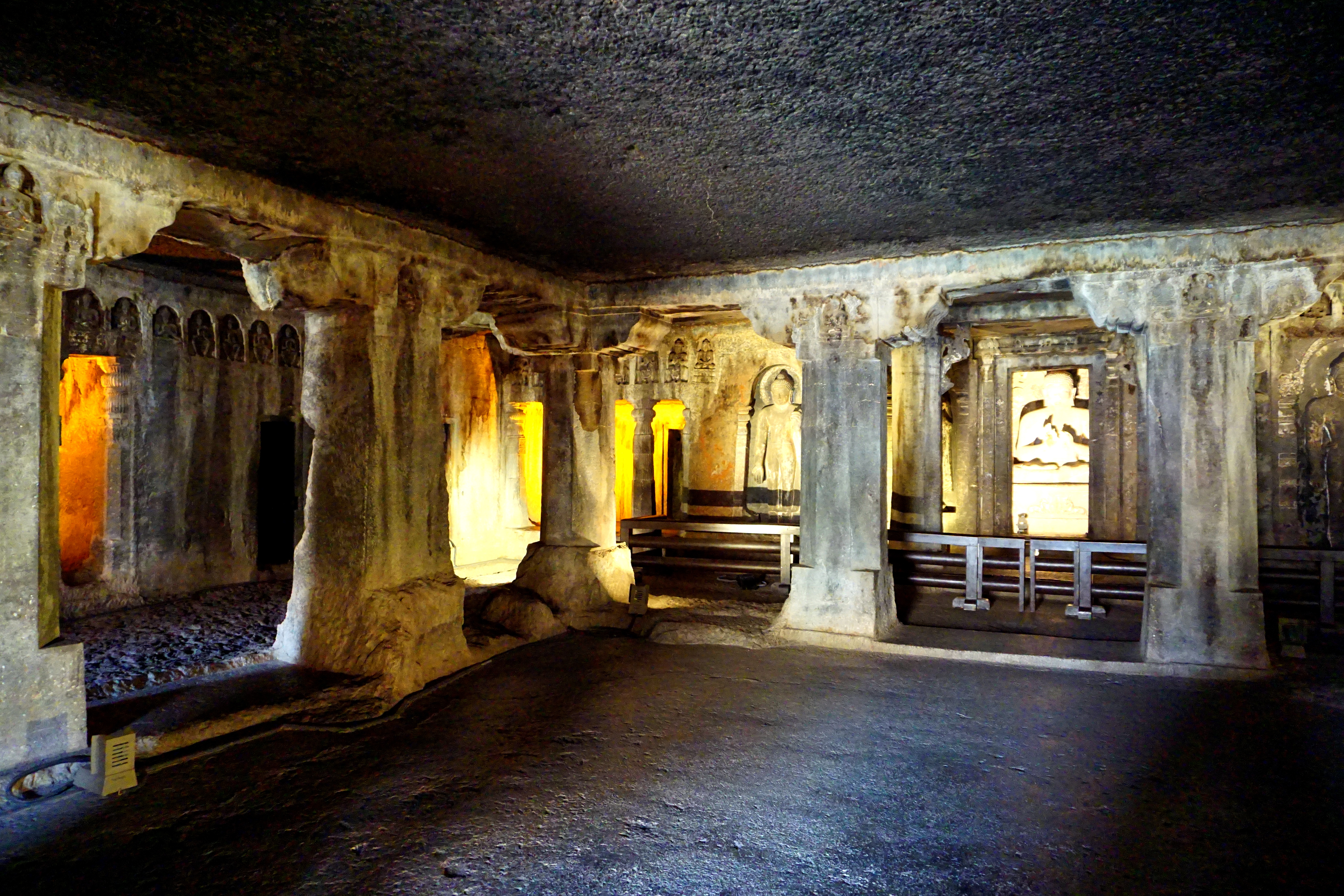
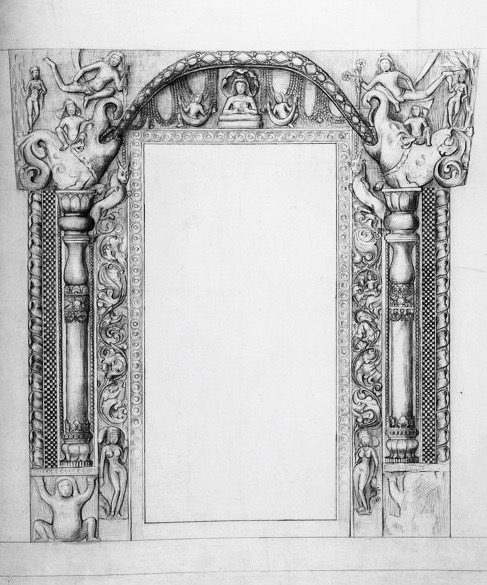
A view of the entrance and two storeys (left), upper-level hall, and artwork on sanctum's door frame

Cave 6 is two-storey monastery (16.85 × 18.07 m). It consists of a sanctum, a hall on both levels. The lower level is pillared and has attached cells. The upper hall also has subsidiary cells. The sanctums on both level feature a Buddha in the teaching posture. Elsewhere, the Buddha is shown in different mudras. The lower level walls depict the Miracle of Sravasti and the Temptation of Mara legends. Only the lower floor of cave 6 was finished. The unfinished upper floor of cave 6 has many private votive sculptures, and a shrine Buddha.

The lower level of Cave 6 likely was the earliest excavation in the second stage of construction. This stage marked the Mahayana theme and Vakataka renaissance period of Ajanta reconstruction that started about four centuries after the earlier Hinayana theme construction. The upper storey was not envisioned in the beginning, it was added as an afterthought, likely around the time when the architects and artists abandoned further work on the geologically flawed rock of Cave 5 immediately next to it. Both lower and upper Cave 6 show crude experimentation and construction errors. The cave work was most likely in progress between 460 and 470 CE, and it is the first that shows attendant Bodhisattvas. The upper cave construction probably began in 465, progressed swiftly, and much deeper into the rock than the lower level.

The walls and sanctum's door frame of the both levels are intricately carved. These show themes such as makaras and other mythical creatures, apsaras, elephants in different stages of activity, females in waving or welcoming gesture. The upper level of Cave 6 is significant in that it shows a devotee in a kneeling posture at the Buddha's feet, an indication of devotional worship practices by the 5th century. The colossal Buddha of the shrine has an elaborate throne back, but was hastily finished in 477/478 CE, when king Harisena died. The shrine antechamber of the cave features an unfinished sculptural group of the Six Buddhas of the Past, of which only five statues were carved. This idea may have been influenced from those in Bagh Caves of Madhya Pradesh.

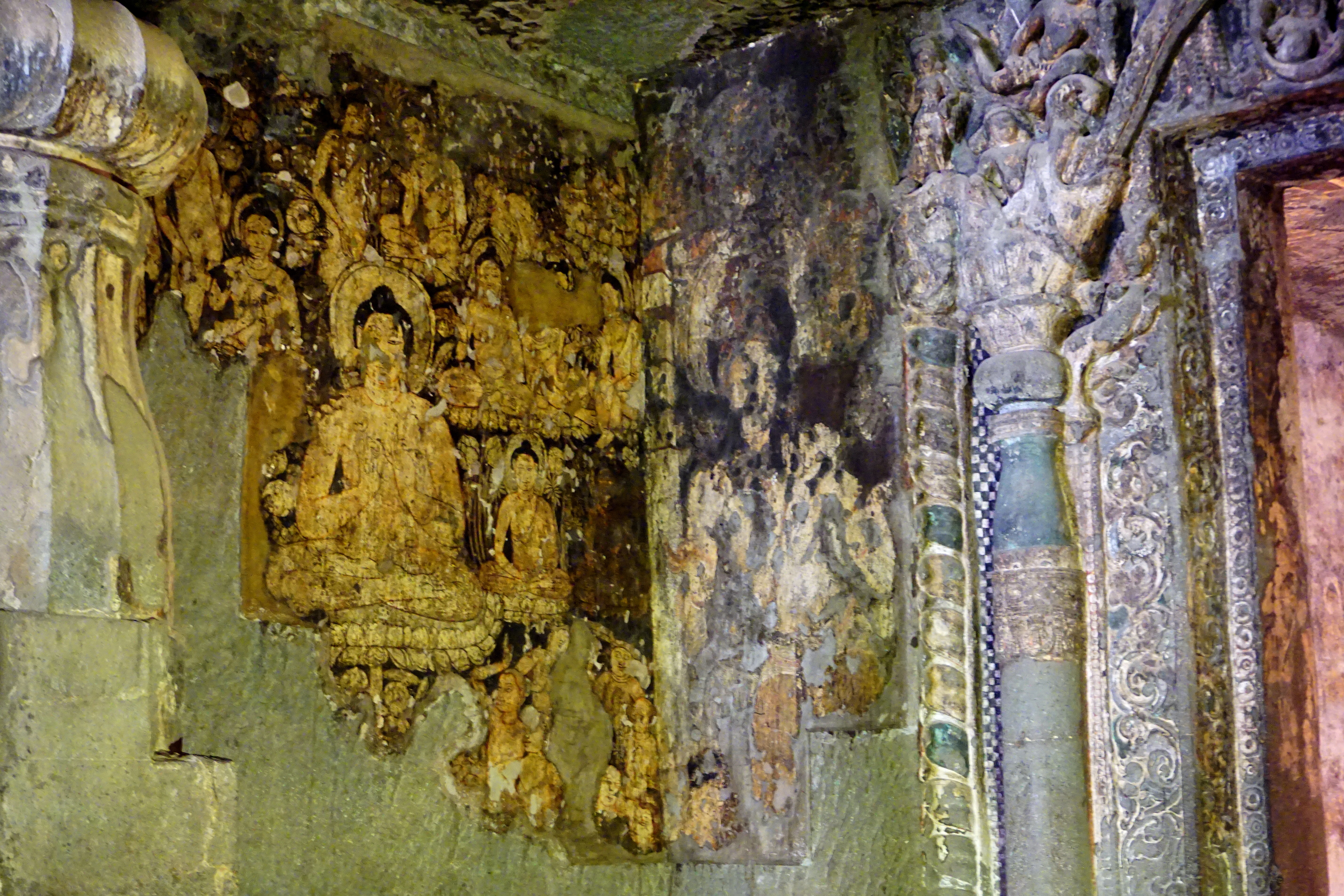
The most intact painting in Cave 6: Buddha seated in dharma-chakra-mudra

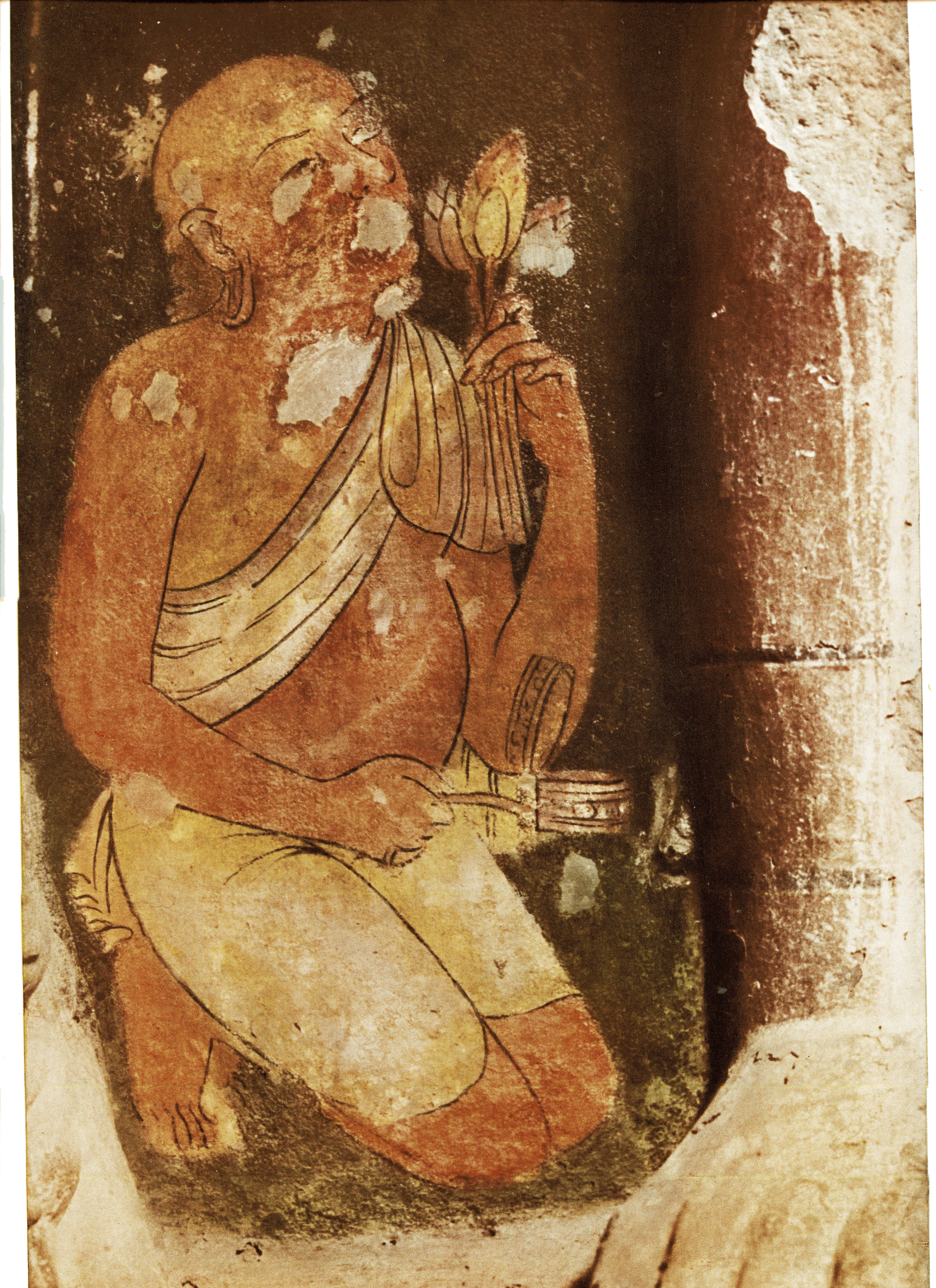
Painting showing the Mahayana devotional worship to the Buddha

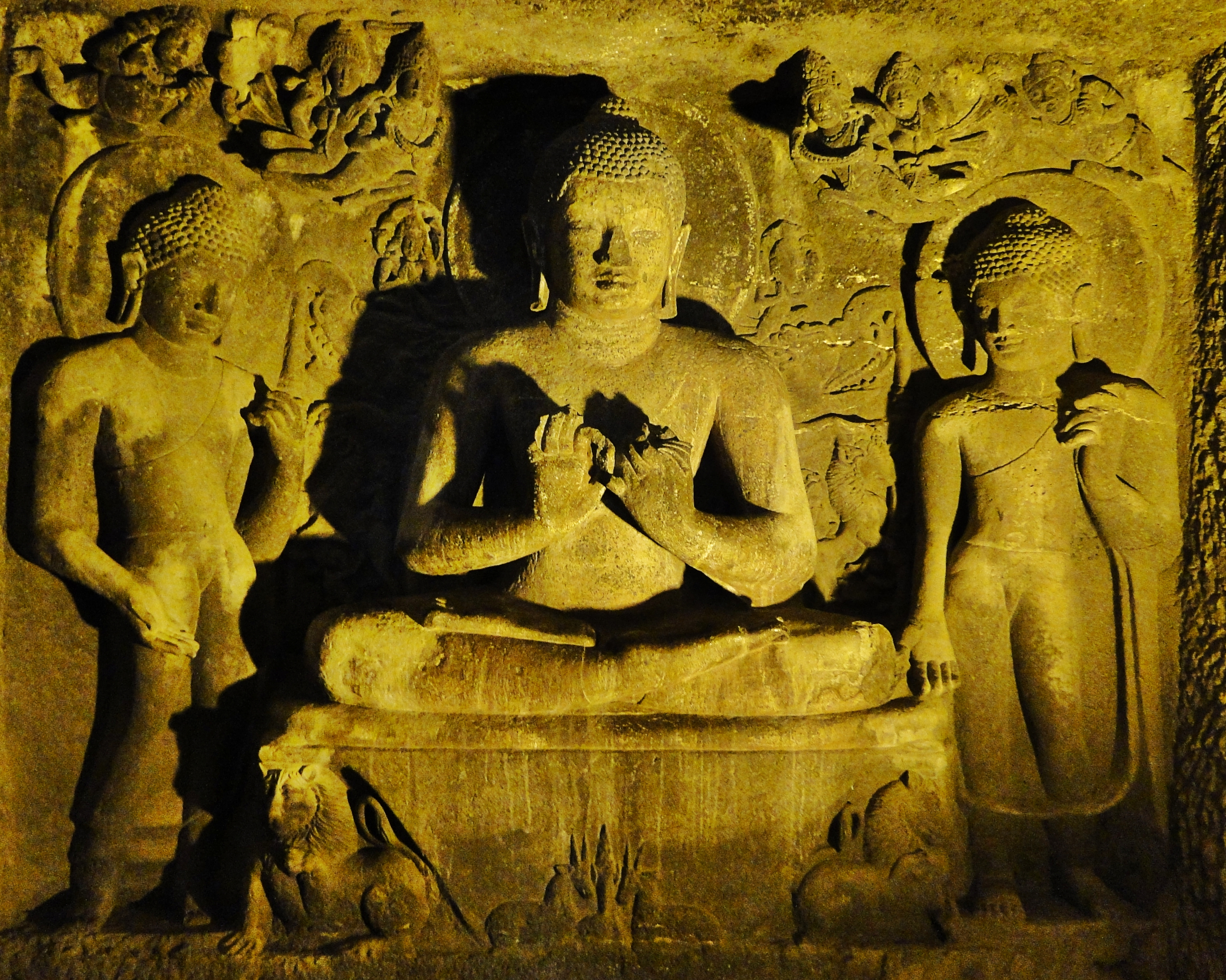
Buddha in the upper level, deer below and apsaras above (artificial lighting)

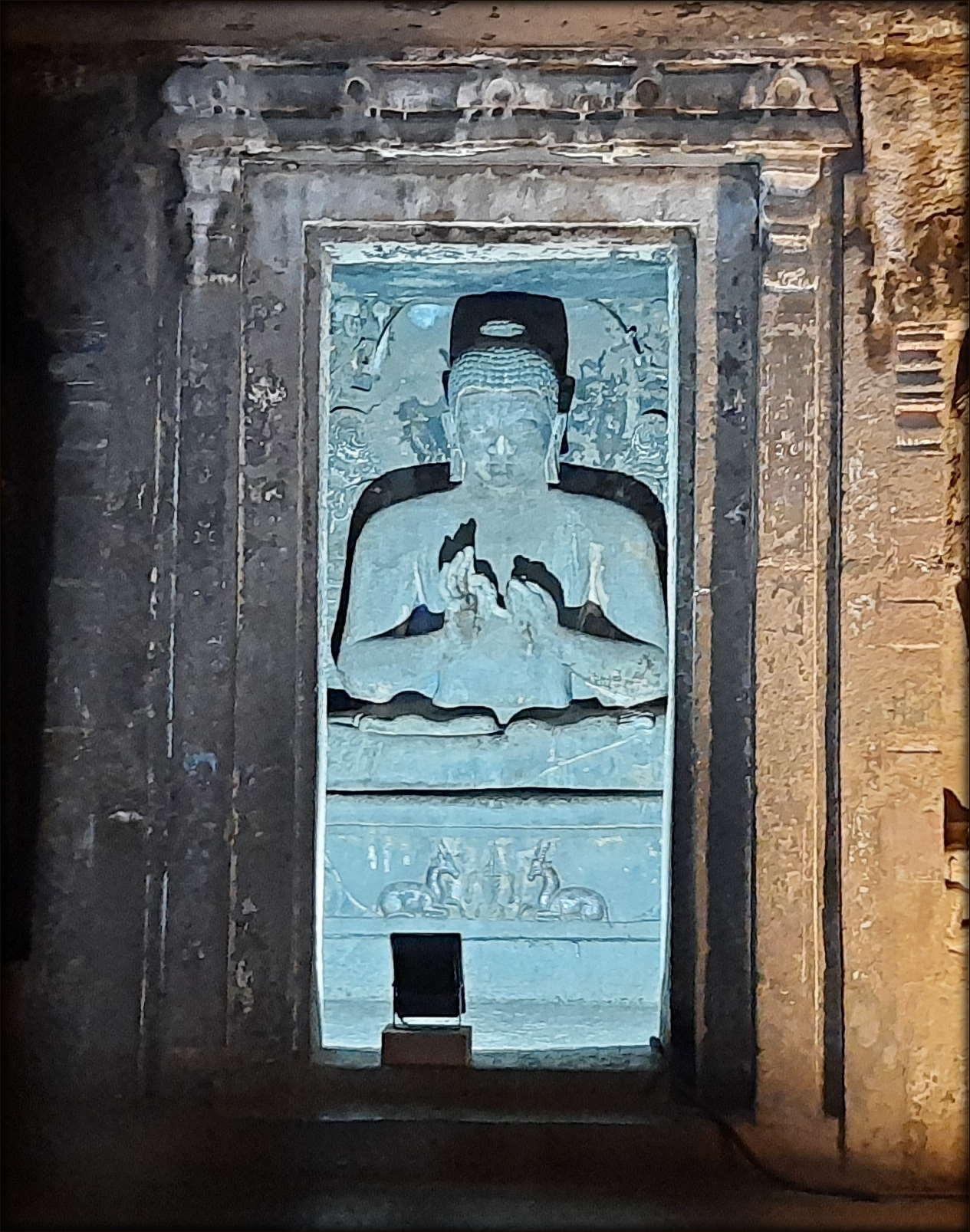
Bhagwan Buddha

== Cave 7 ==
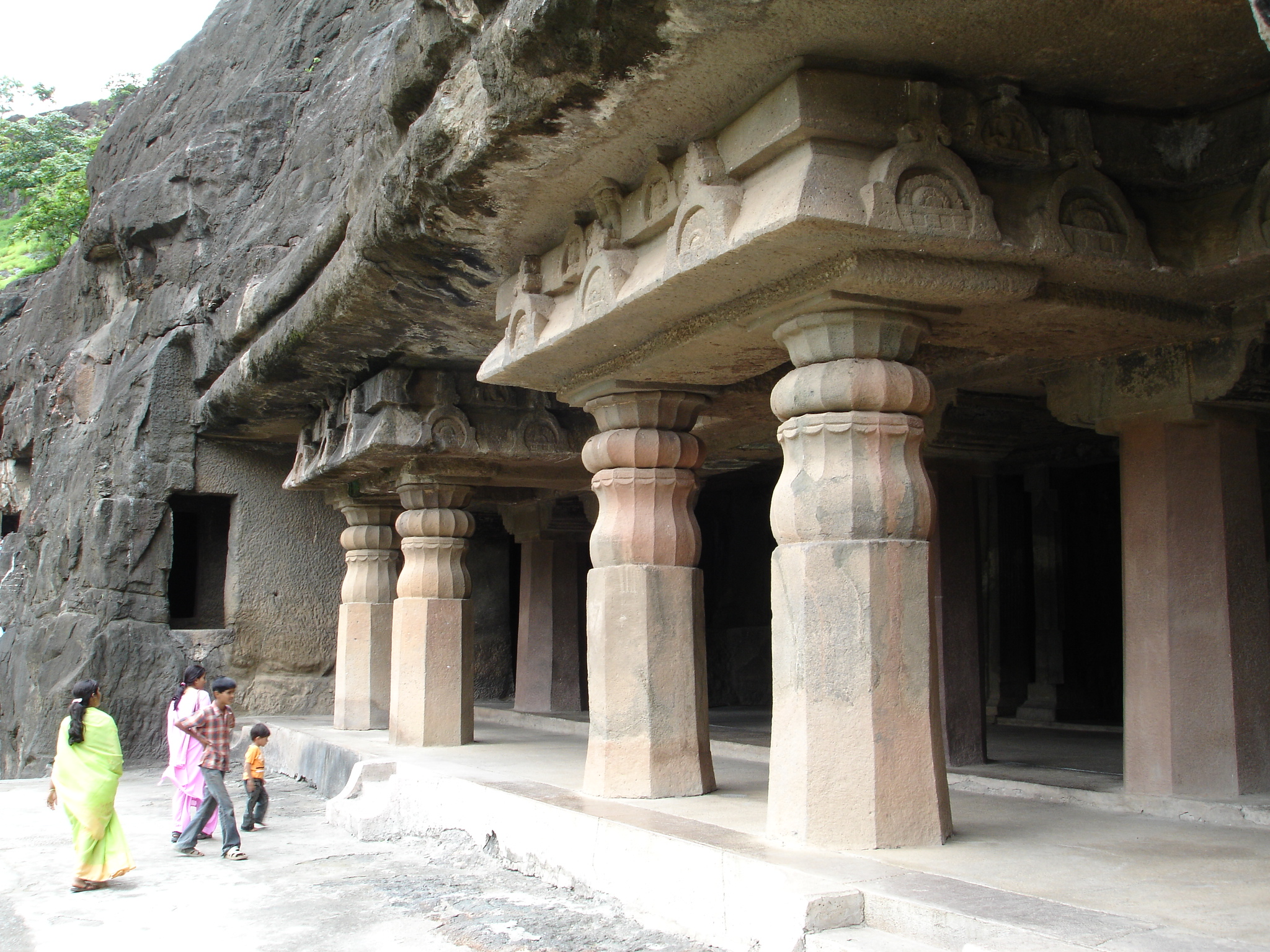
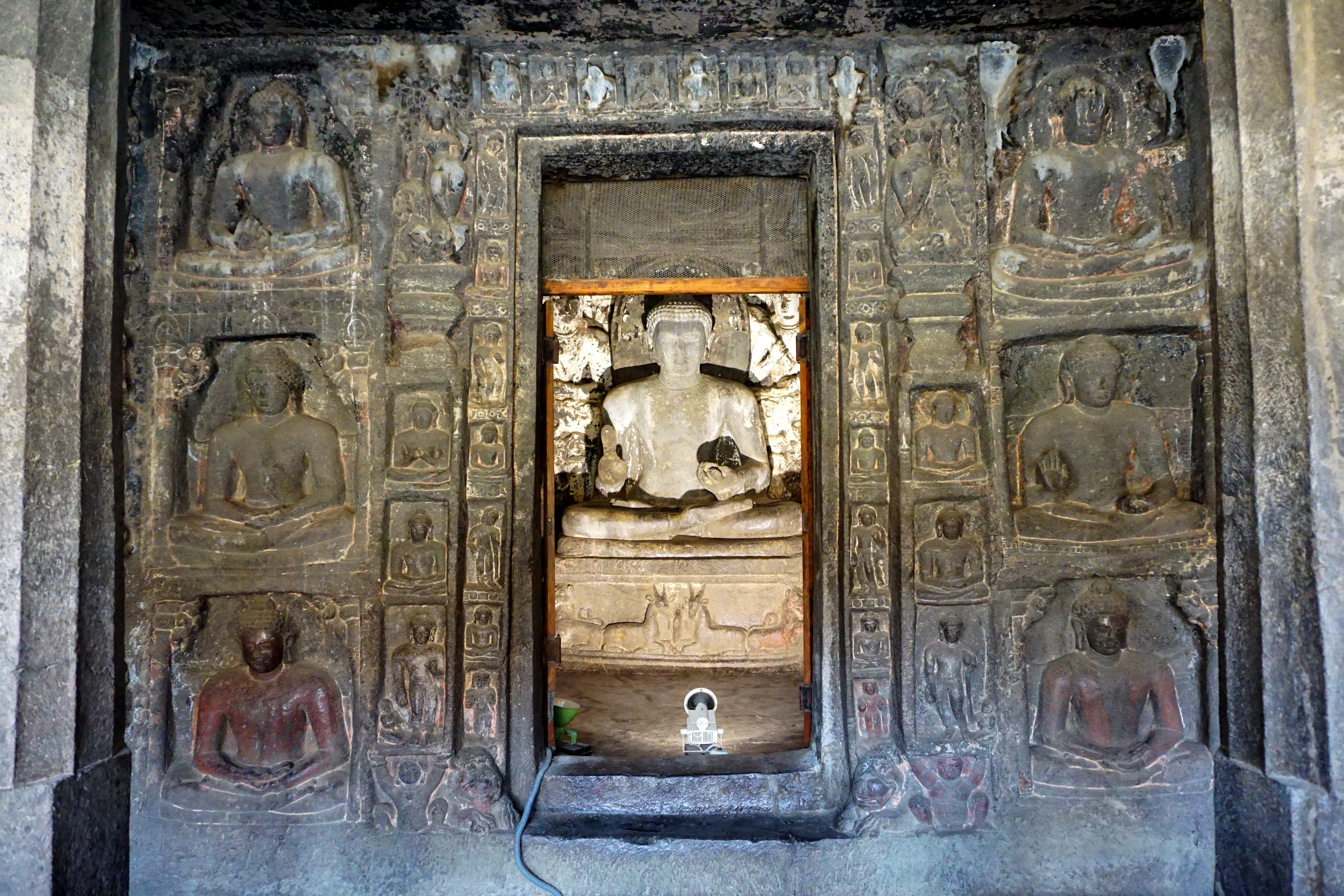
External view of Cave 7, and inside shrine

Cave 7 is also a monastery (15.55 × 31.25 m) but a single storey. It consists of a sanctum, a hall with octagonal pillars, and eight small rooms for monks. The sanctum Buddha is shown in preaching posture. There are many art panels narrating Buddhist themes, including those of the Buddha with Nagamuchalinda and Miracle of Sravasti.

Cave 7 has a grand facade with two porticos. The veranda has eight pillars of two types. One has an octagonal base with amalaka and lotus capital. The other lacks a distinctly shaped base, features an octagonal shaft instead with a plain capital. The veranda opens into an antechamber. On the left side in this antechamber are seated or standing sculptures such as those of 25 carved seated Buddhas in various postures and facial expressions, while on the right side are 58 seated Buddha reliefs in different postures, all placed on lotus. These Buddhas and others on the inner walls of the antechamber are a sculptural depiction of the Miracle of Sravasti in Buddhist theology. The bottom row shows two Nagas (serpents with hoods) holding the blooming lotus stalk. The antechamber leads to the sanctum through a door frame. On this frame are carved two females standing on makaras (mythical sea creatures). Inside the sanctum is the Buddha sitting on a lion throne in cross legged posture, surrounded by other Bodhisattva figures, two attendants with chauris (fly-whisks) and flying apsaras above.

Perhaps because of faults in the rock, Cave 7 was never taken very deep into the cliff. It consists only of the two porticos and a shrine room with antechamber, with no central hall. Some cells were fitted in. The cave artwork likely underwent revisions and refurbishments over time. The first version was complete by about 469 CE, the myriad Buddhas added and painted a few years later between 476 and 478 CE.

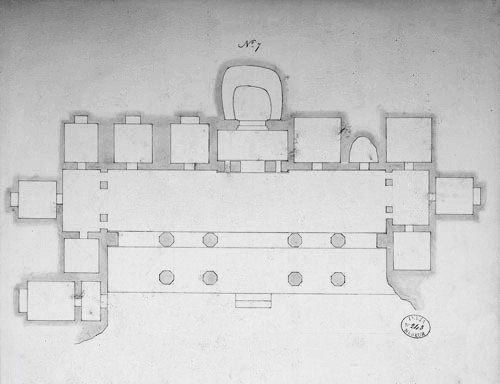
Cave 7 plan (Robert Gill sketch, 1850)

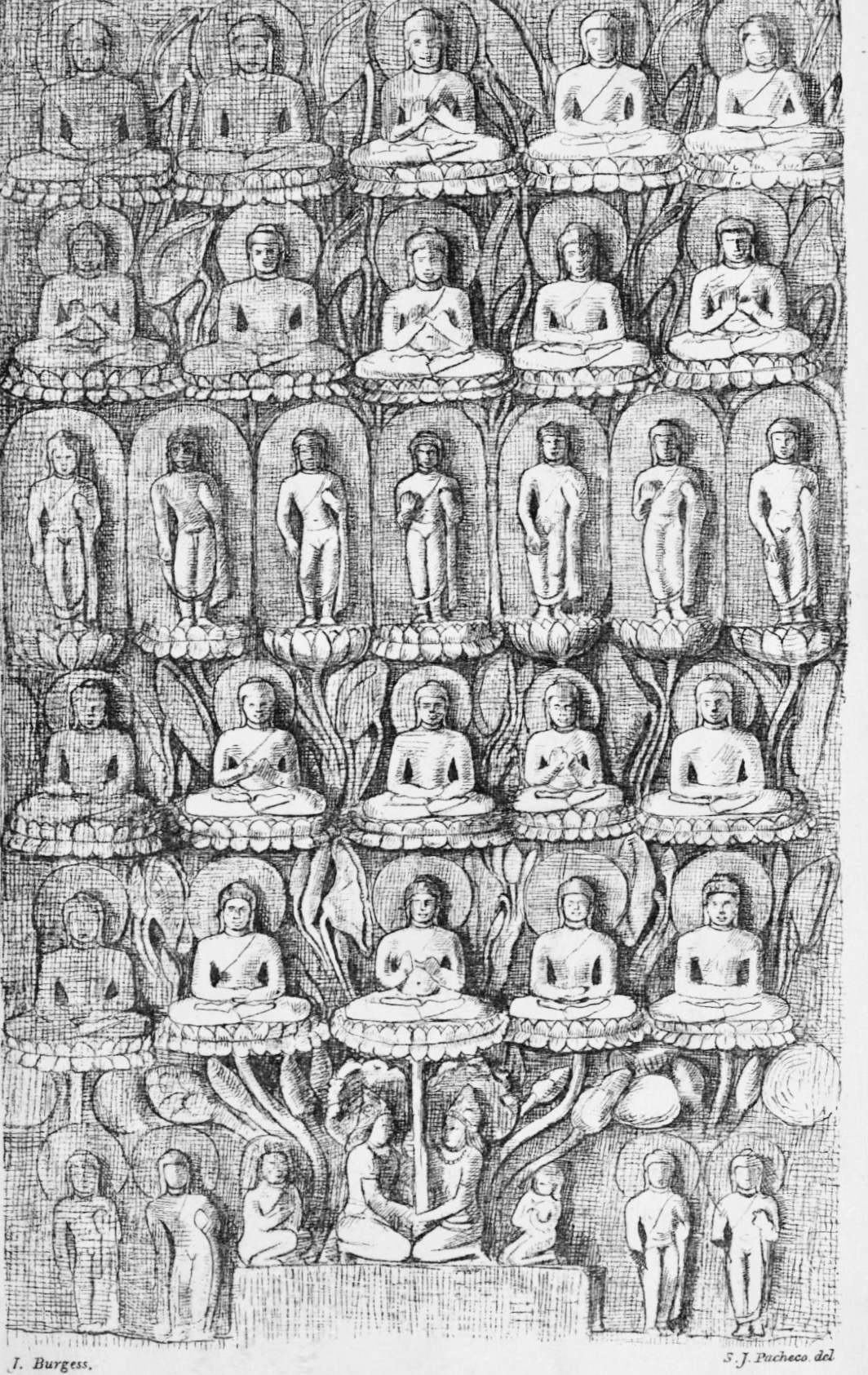
Cave 7: Buddhas on the antechamber left wall (James Burgess sketch, 1880)

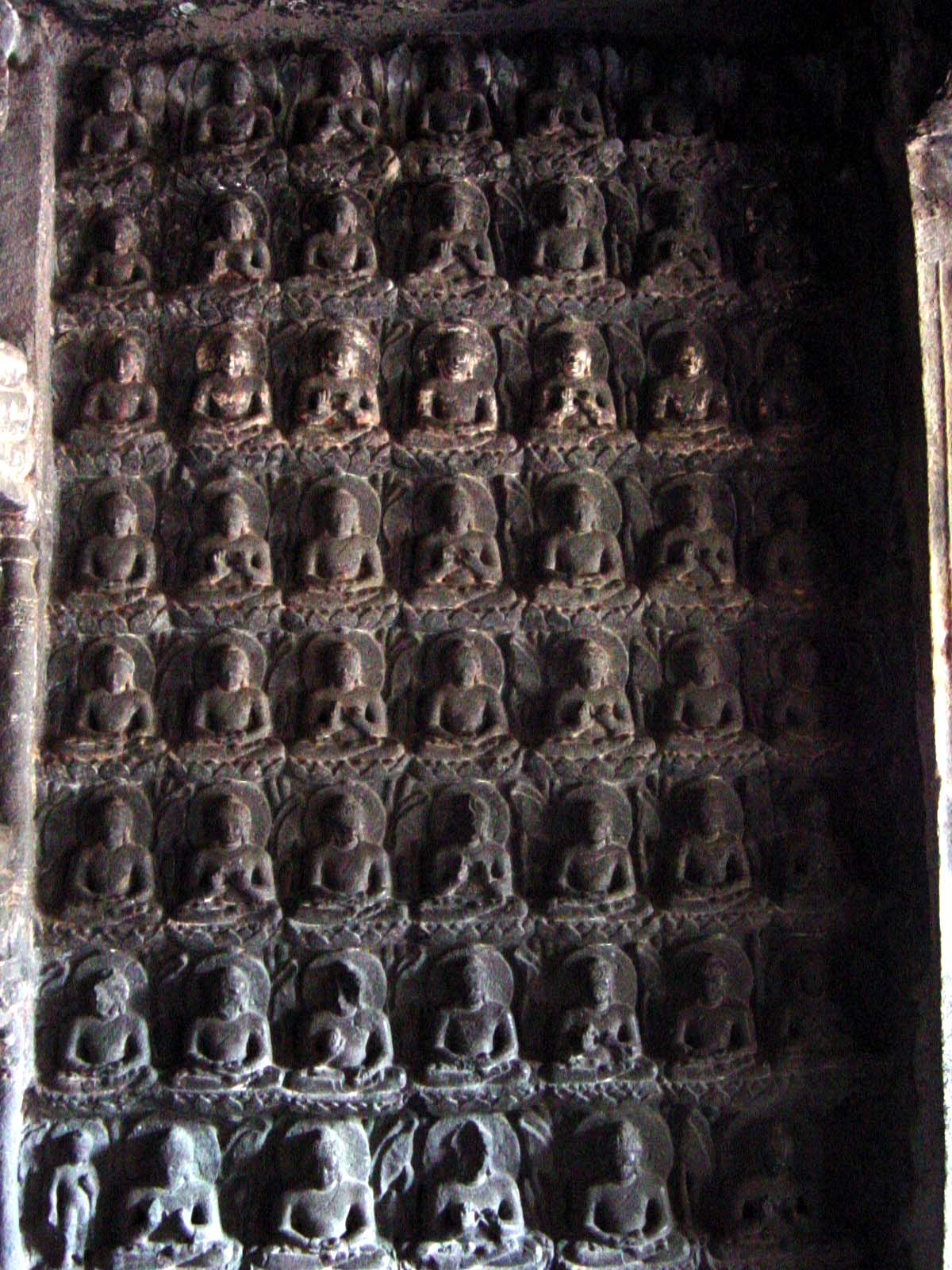
Buddhas on the antechamber's right wall

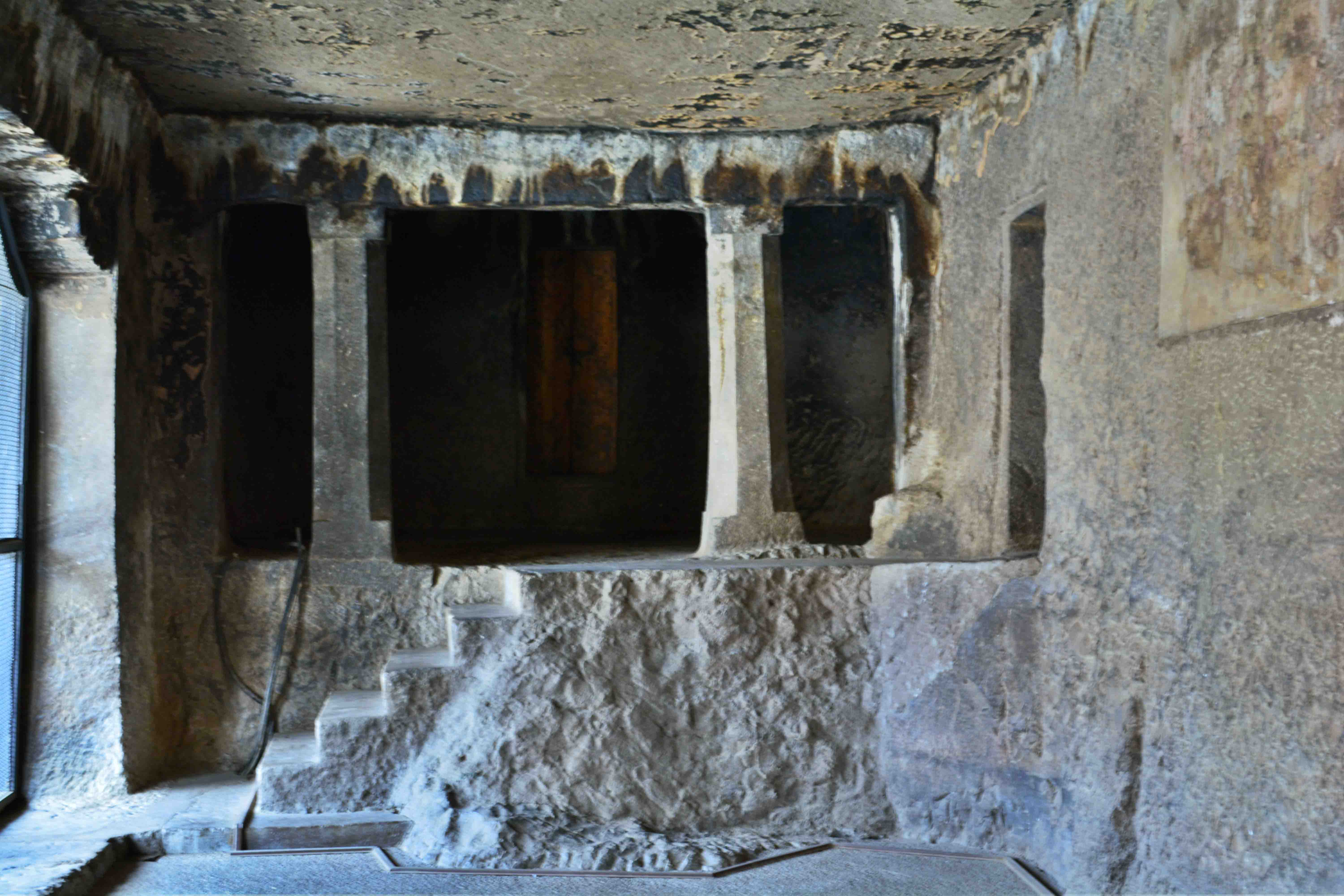
The shallow corridor before the shrine

== Cave 8 ==
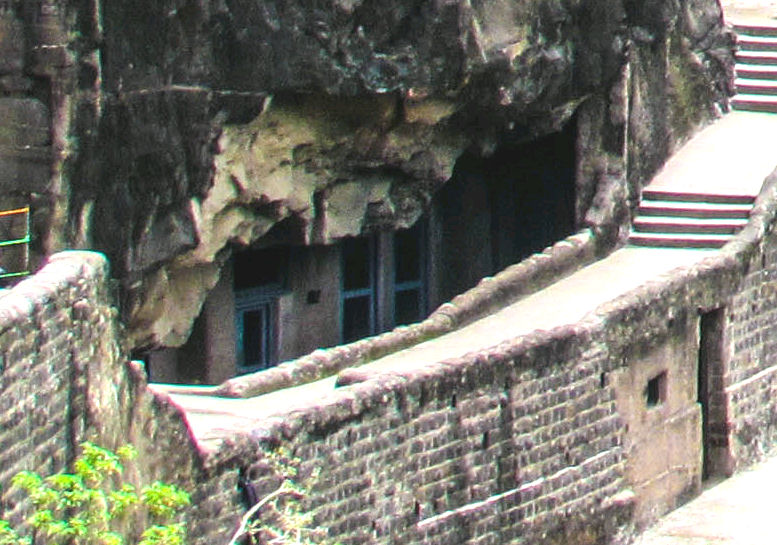
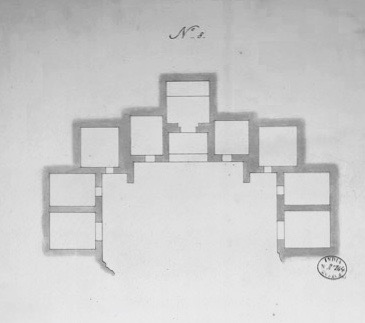
External view of Cave 8, with plan. Cave 8 is small, and located at the lowest level in Ajanta, just below the walkway between Caves 7 and 9.

Cave 8 is another unfinished monastery (15.24 × 24.64 m). For many decades in the 20th century, this cave was used as a storage and generator room. It is at the river level with easy access, relatively lower than other caves, and according to Archaeological Survey of India it is possibly one of the earliest monasteries. Much of its front is damaged, likely from a landslide. The cave excavation proved difficult and probably abandoned after a geological fault consisting of a mineral layer proved disruptive to stable carvings.

Spink, in contrast, states that Cave 8 is perhaps the earliest cave from the second period, its shrine an "afterthought". It may well be the oldest Mahayana monastery excavated in India, according to Spink. The statue may have been loose rather than carved from the living rock, as it has now vanished. The cave was painted, but only traces remain.

== Cave 9 ==
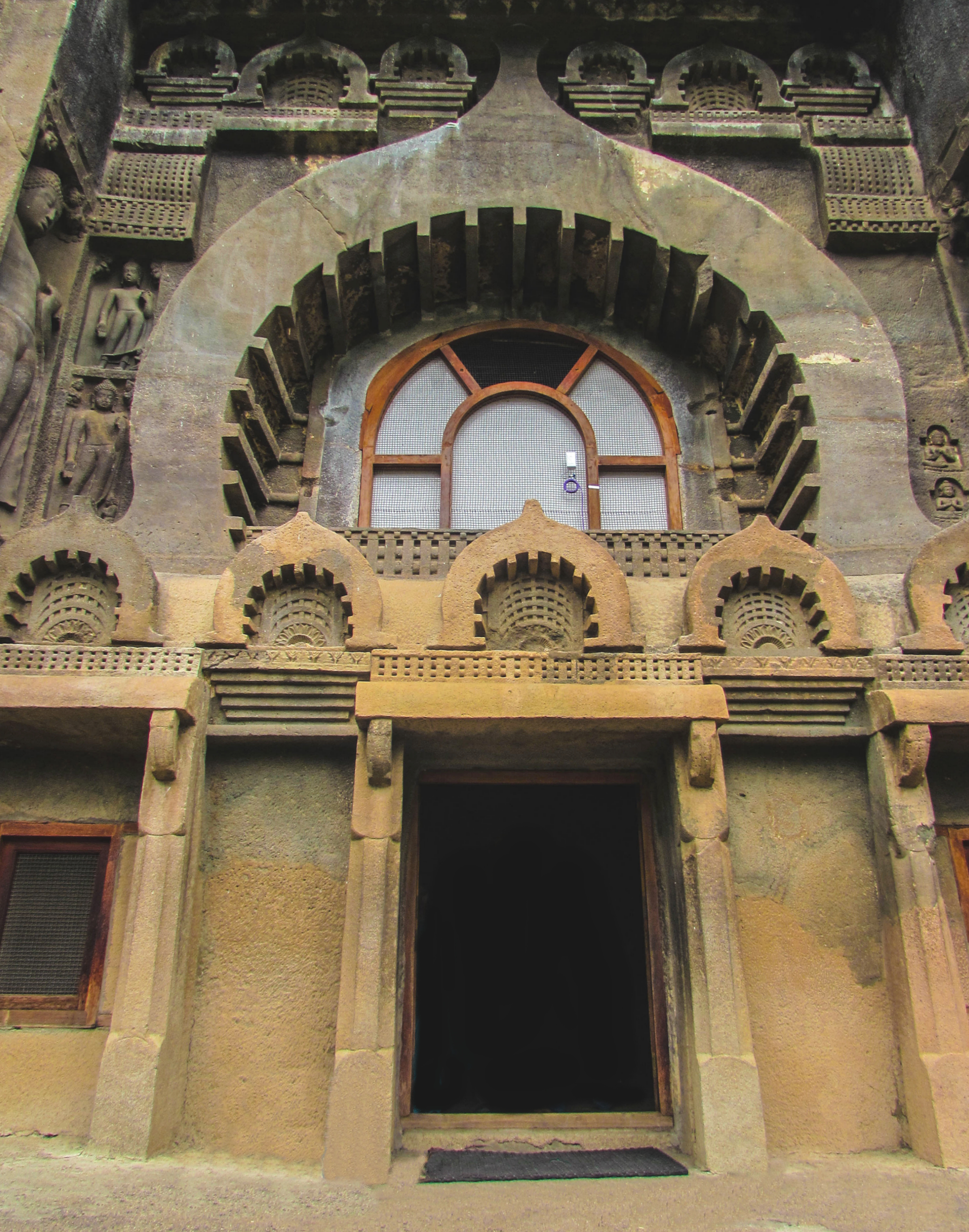
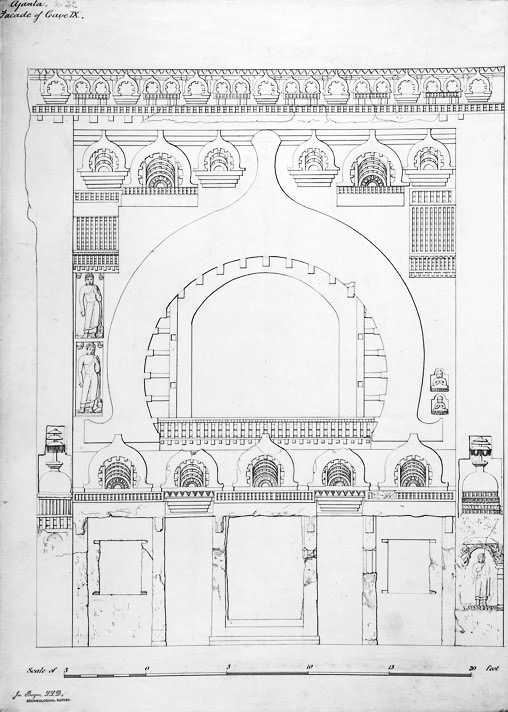
Entrance to the Cave 9 worship hall. Right: An 1878 sketch.

Caves 9 and 10 are the two chaitya or worship halls from the 2nd to 1st century BCE – the first period of construction, though both were reworked upon the end of the second period of construction in the 5th century CE.

Cave 9 (18.24 m × 8.04 m) is smaller than Cave 10 (30.5 m × 12.2 m), but more complex. This has led Spink to the view that Cave 10 was perhaps originally of the 1st century BCE, and cave 9 about a hundred years later. The small "shrinelets" called caves 9A to 9D and 10A also date from the second period. These were commissioned by individuals. Cave 9 arch has remnant profile that suggests that it likely had wooden fittings.

The cave has a distinct apsidal shape, nave, aisle and an apse with an icon, architecture, and plan that reminds one of the cathedrals built in Europe many centuries later. The aisle has a row of 23 pillars. The ceiling is vaulted. The stupa is at the center of the apse, with a circumambulation path around it. The stupa sits on a high cylindrical base. On the left wall of the cave are votaries approaching the stupa, which suggests a devotional tradition.

According to Spink, the paintings in this cave, including the intrusive standing Buddhas on the pillars, were added in the 5th century. Above the pillars and also behind the stupa are colorful paintings of the Buddha with Padmapani and Vajrapani next to him, they wear jewels and necklaces, while yogis, citizens and Buddhist bhikshu are shown approaching the Buddha with garlands and offerings, with men wearing dhoti and turbans wrapped around their heads. On the walls are friezes of Jataka tales, but likely from the Hinayana phase of early construction. Some of the panels and reliefs inside as well as outside Cave 10 do not make narrative sense, but are related to Buddhist legends. This lack of narrative flow may be because these were added by different monks and official donors in the 5th century wherever empty space was available. This devotionalism and the worship hall character of this cave is the likely reason why four additional shrinelets 9A, 9B, 9C, and 9D were added between Cave 9 and 10.

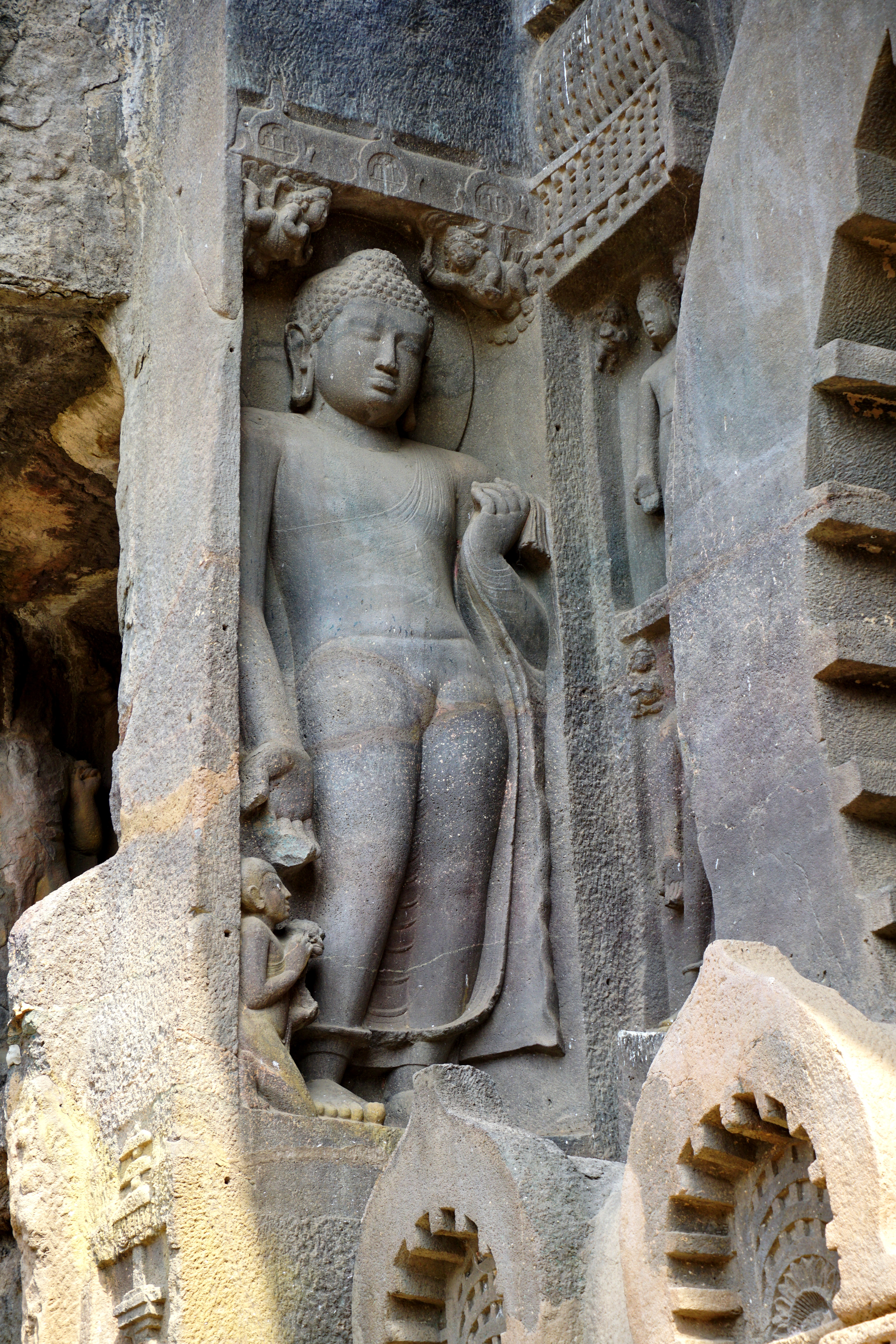
Buddha statue on the porch of Cave 9

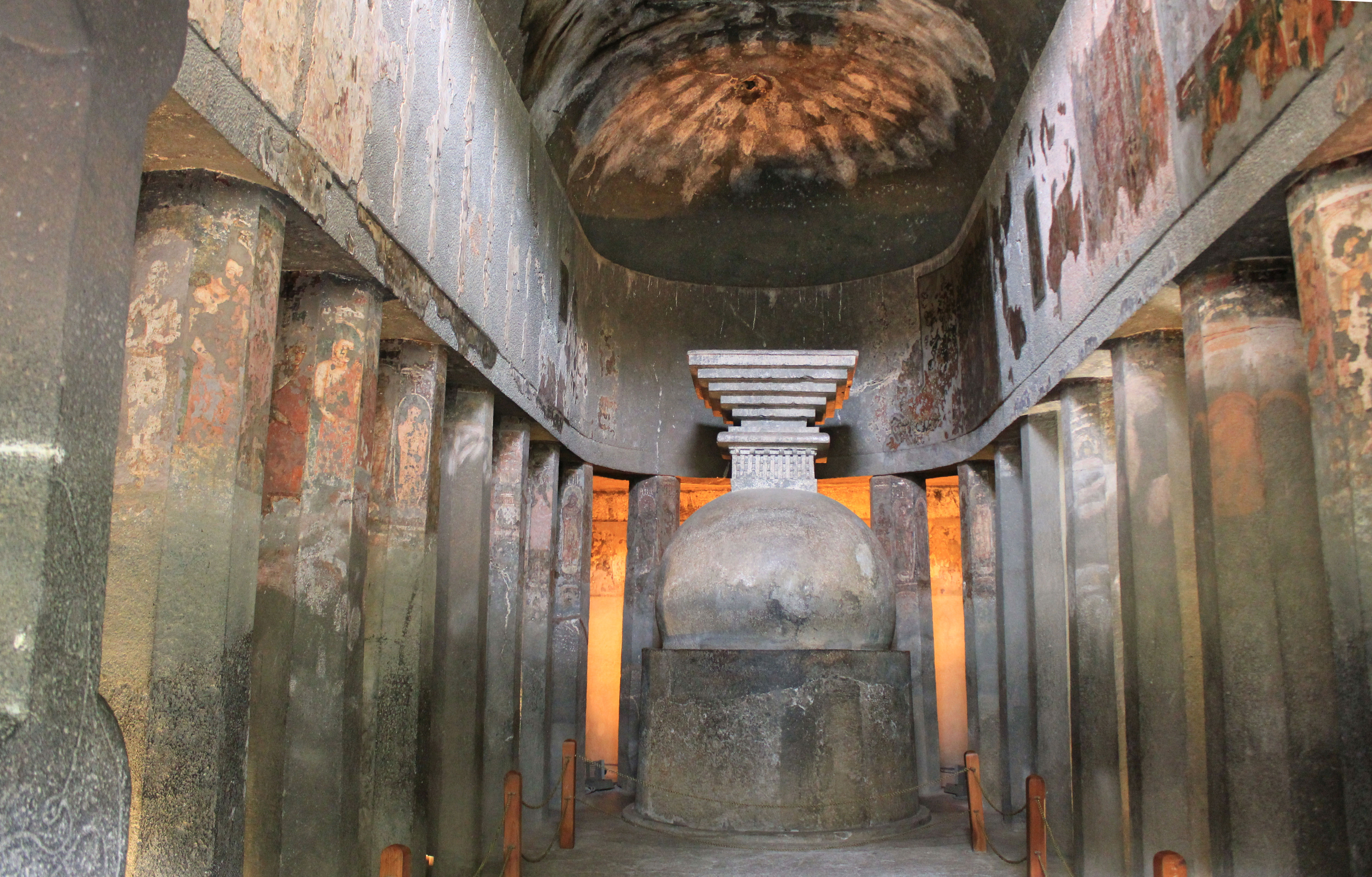
The apsidal hall with plain hemispherical stupa at apse's center

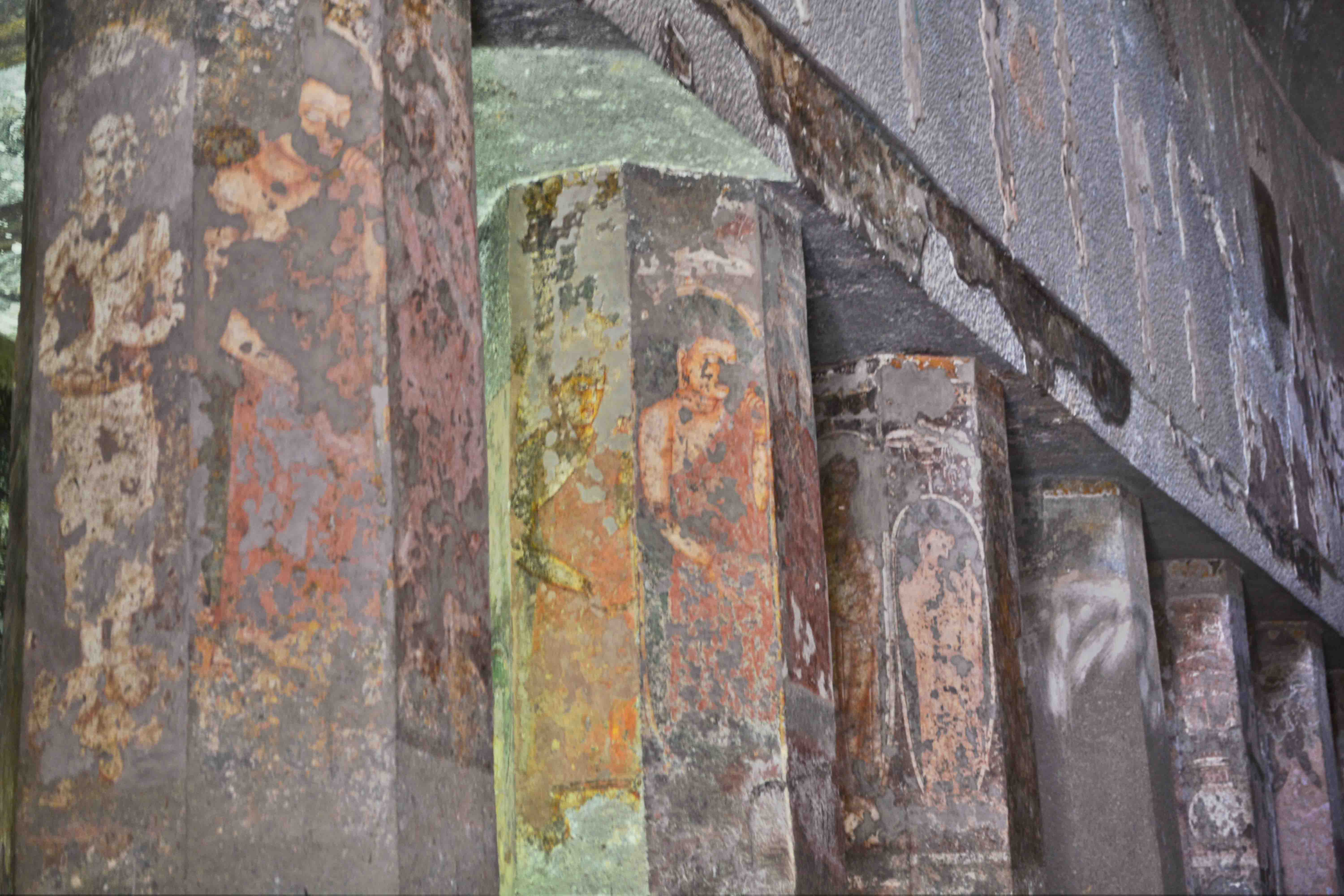
Pillar paintings

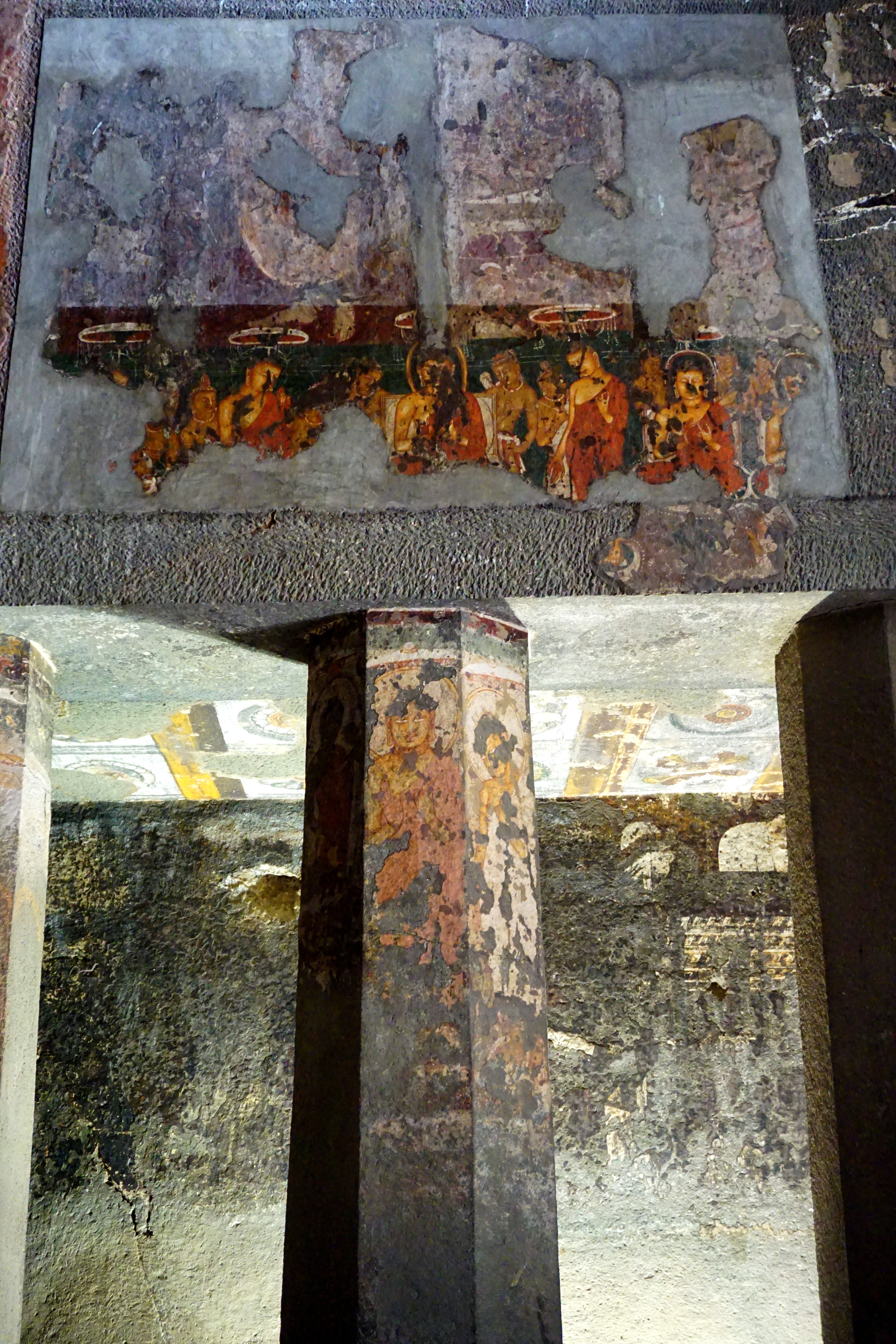
Cave 9: fresco with Buddhas in orange robes and protected by chatra umbrellas

== Cave 10 ==
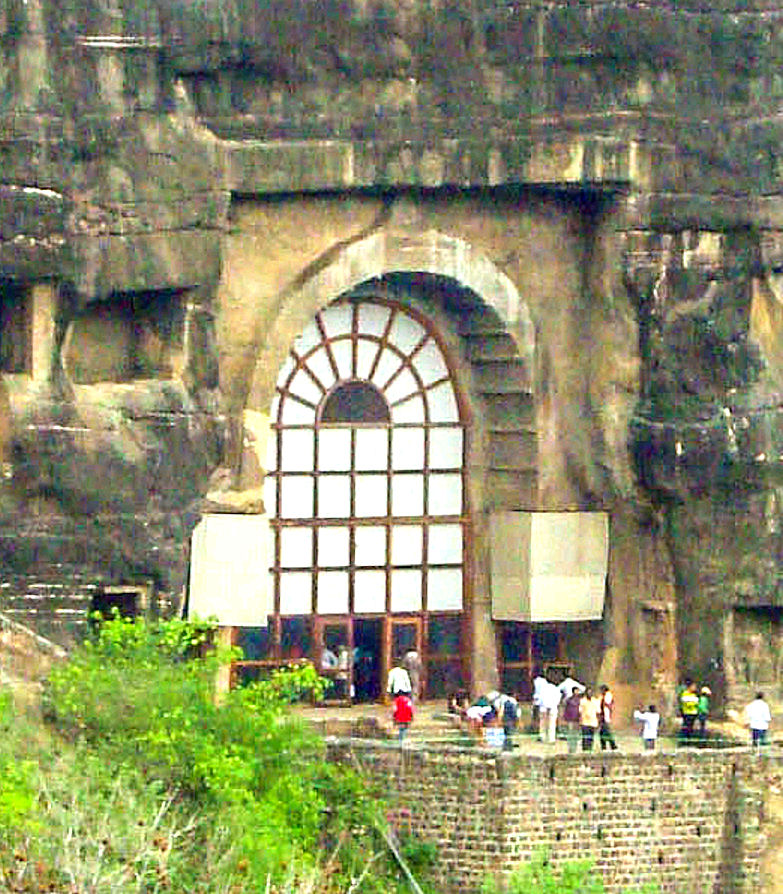
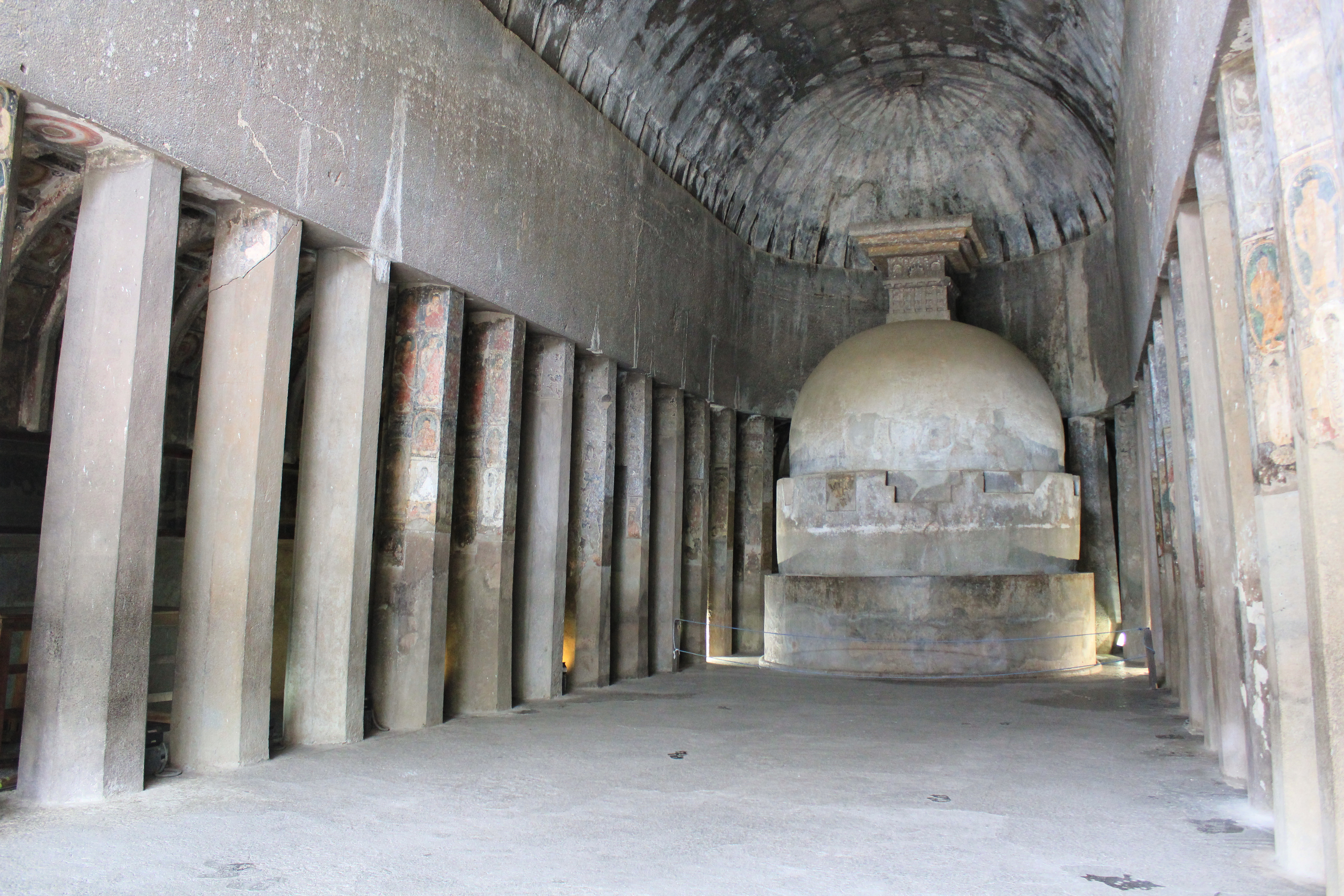
Exterior view and interior hall of Cave 10

Cave 10, a vast prayer hall or Chaitya, is dated to about the 1st century BCE, together with the nearby vihara cave No 12. These two caves are thus among the earliest of the Ajanta complex. It has a large central apsidal hall with a row of 39 octagonal pillars, a nave separating its aisle and stupa at the end for worship. The stupa has a pradakshina patha (circumambulatory path).

This cave is significant because its scale confirms the influence of Buddhism in South Asia by the 1st century BCE and its continued though declining influence in India through the 5th century CE. Further, the cave includes a number of inscriptions where parts of the cave are "gifts of prasada" by different individuals, which in turn suggests that the cave was sponsored as a community effort rather than a single king or one elite official. Cave 10 is also historically important because in April 1819, a British Army officer John Smith saw its arch and introduced his discovery to the attention of the Western audience.

Chronology

Several others caves were also built in Western India around the same period under royal sponsorship. It is thought that the chronology of these early Chaitya Caves is as follows: first Cave 9 at Kondivite Caves and then Cave 12 at the Bhaja Caves, which both predate Cave 10 of Ajanta. Then, after Cave 10 of Ajanta, in chronological order: Cave 3 at Pitalkhora, Cave 1 at Kondana Caves, Cave 9 at Ajanta, which, with its more ornate designs, may have been built about a century later, Cave 18 at Nasik Caves, and Cave 7 at Bedse Caves, to finally culminate with the "final perfection" of the Great Chaitya at Karla Caves.

Inscription

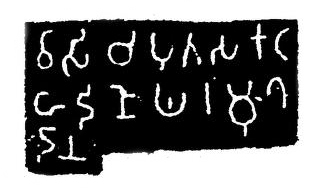
Ajanta Cave 10 dedicatory inscription

Cave 10 features a Sanskrit inscription in Brahmi script that is archaeologically important. The inscription is the oldest of the Ajanta site, the Brahmi letters being paleographically dated to circa the 2nd century BCE. It reads: (Note: The inscription has been connected to the Satavahana ruler Vasishthiputra Pulumavi (c. 170 CE), who is also known for inscription at the Nasik Caves, although there are disagreements since he is very posterior to the 1st century BCE.)

𑀯𑀲𑀺𑀣𑀺𑀧𑀼𑀢𑀲 𑀓𑀝𑀳𑀸𑀤𑀺𑀦𑁄 𑀖𑀭𑀫𑀼𑀔 𑀤𑀸𑀦𑀁
Vasithiputasa Kaṭahādino gharamukha dānaṁ
"The gift of a cave-façade by Vasisthiputra Katahadi."

— Inscription of Cave No.10.

Paintings

The paintings in cave 10 include some surviving from the early period, many from an incomplete programme of modernisation in the second period, and a very large number of smaller late intrusive images for votive purposes, around the 479–480 CE, nearly all Buddhas and many with donor inscriptions from individuals. These mostly avoided over-painting the "official" programme and after the best positions were used up are tucked away in less prominent positions not yet painted; the total of these (including those now lost) was probably over 300, and the hands of many different artists are visible. The paintings are numerous and from two periods, many narrating the Jataka tales in a clockwise sequence. Both Hinayana and Mahayana stage paintings are discernable, though the former are more faded and begrimed with early centuries of Hinayana worship. Of interest here is the Saddanta Jataka tale – the fable about six tusked elephant, and the Shyama Jataka – the story about the man who dedicates his life serving his blind parents. According to Stella Kramrisch, the oldest layer of the Cave 10 paintings date from about 100 BCE, and the principles behind their composition are analogous to those from the same era at Sanchi and Amaravati.

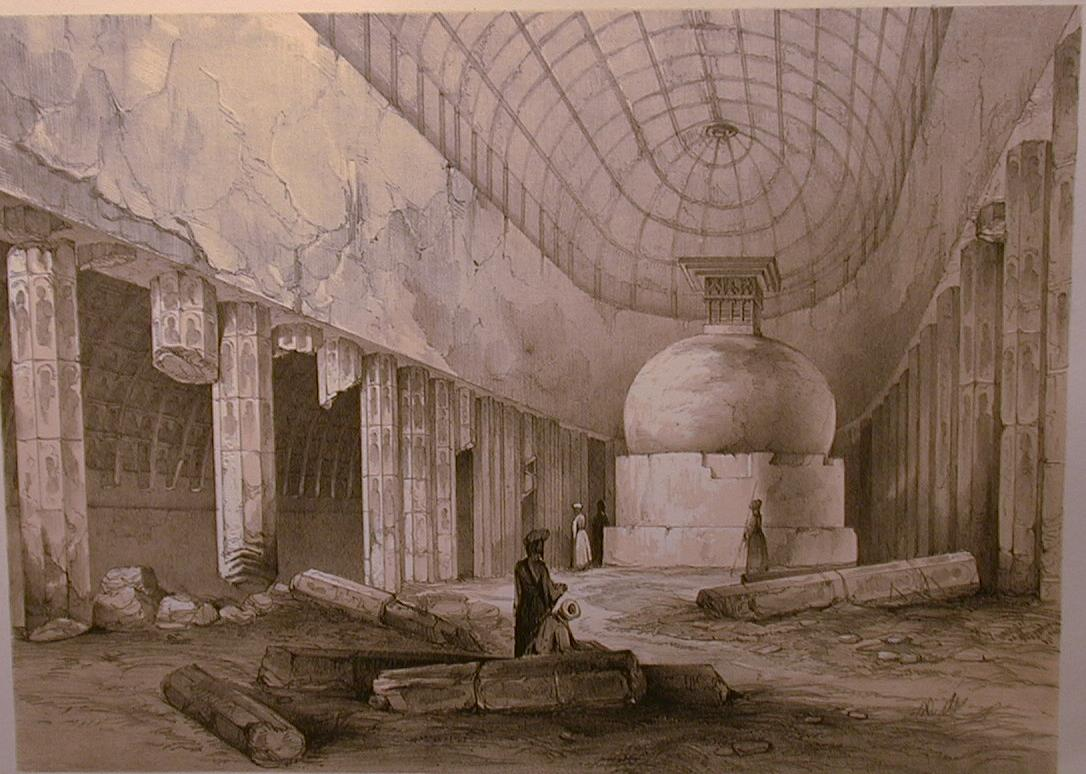
Cave 10, condition in 1839

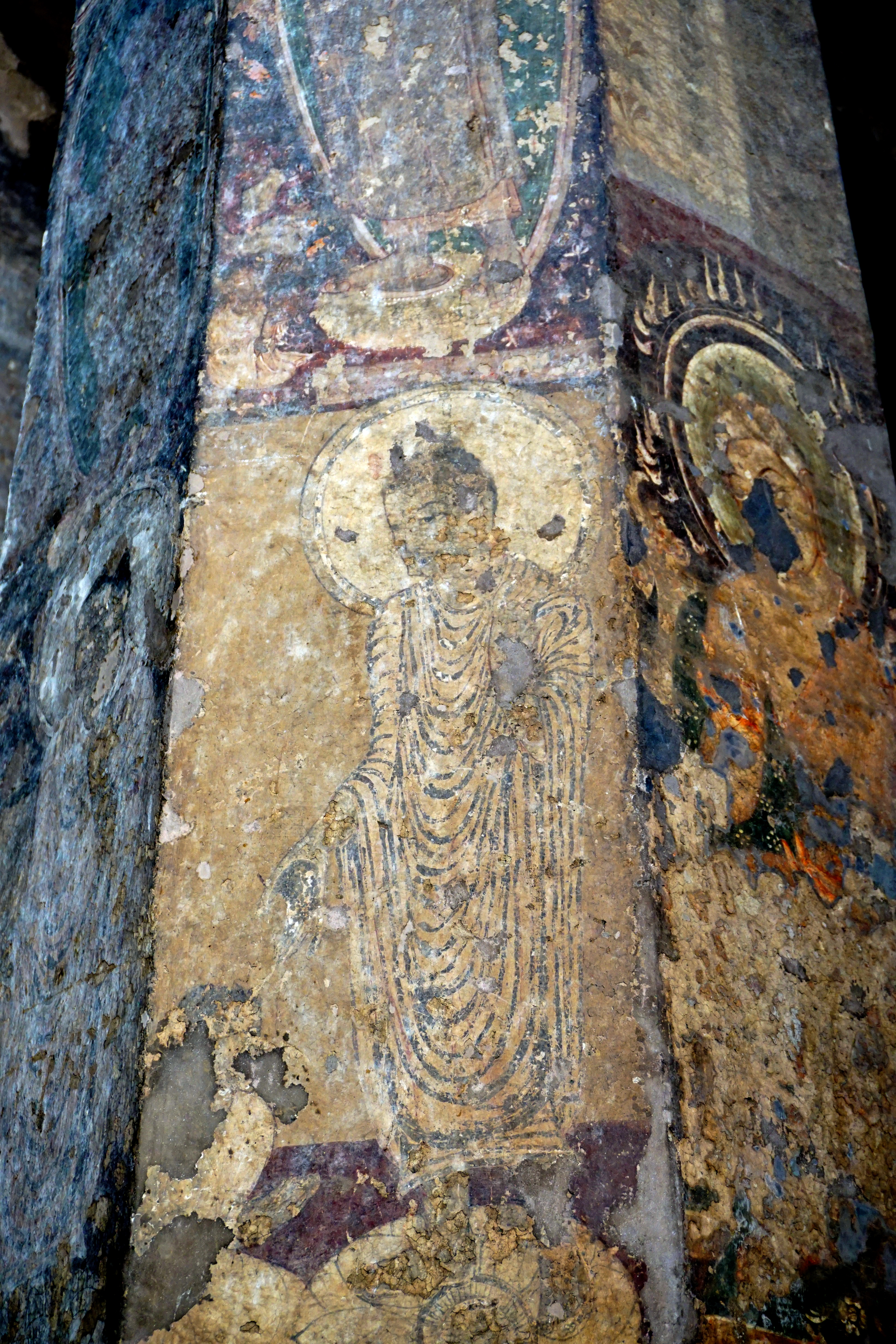
The Buddha in long, heavy robe, a design derived from the art of Gandhara

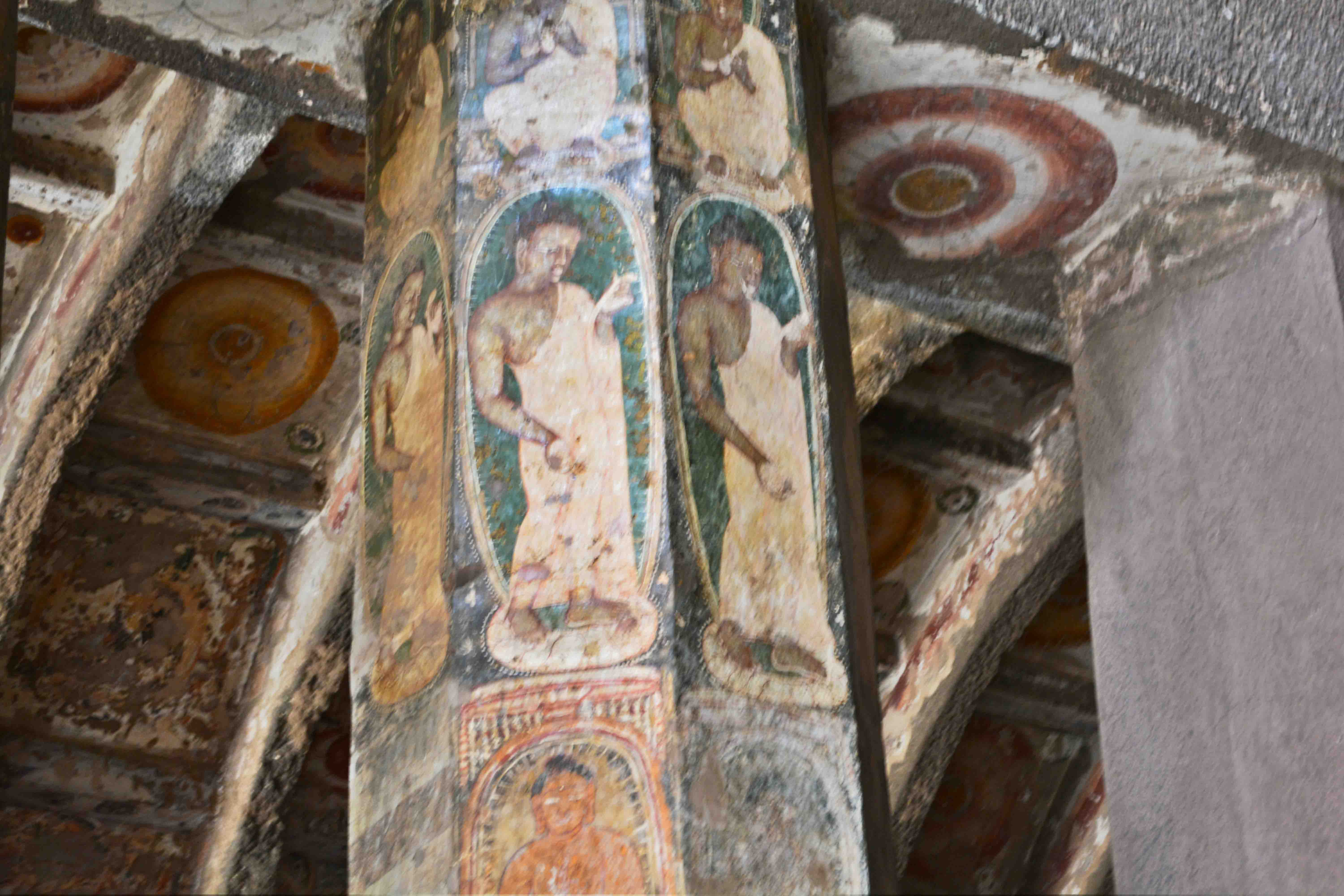
Later painting with devotional figures, on pillars and ceiling

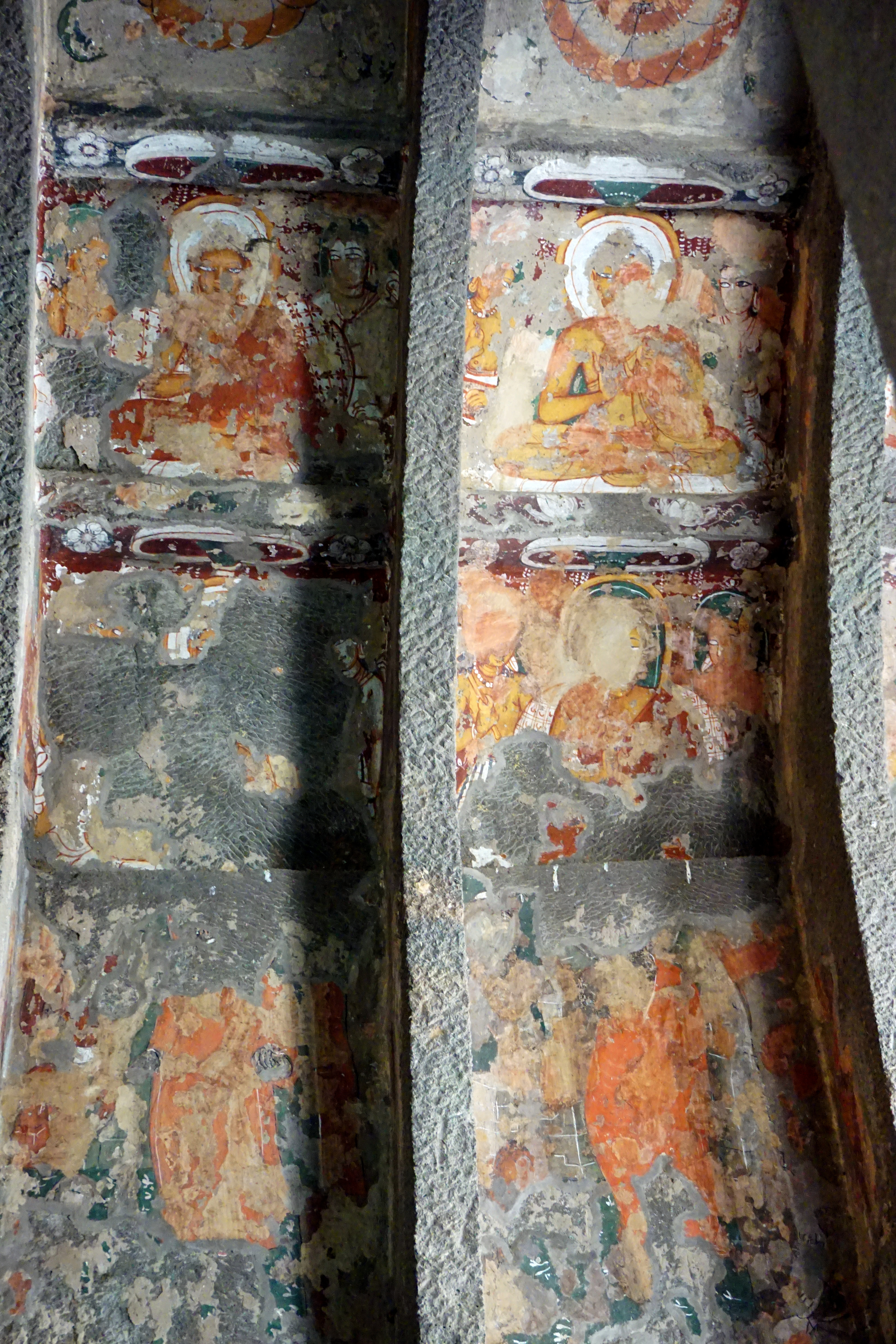
Paintings of Buddhas and Bodhisattvas on the arches

== Cave 11 ==
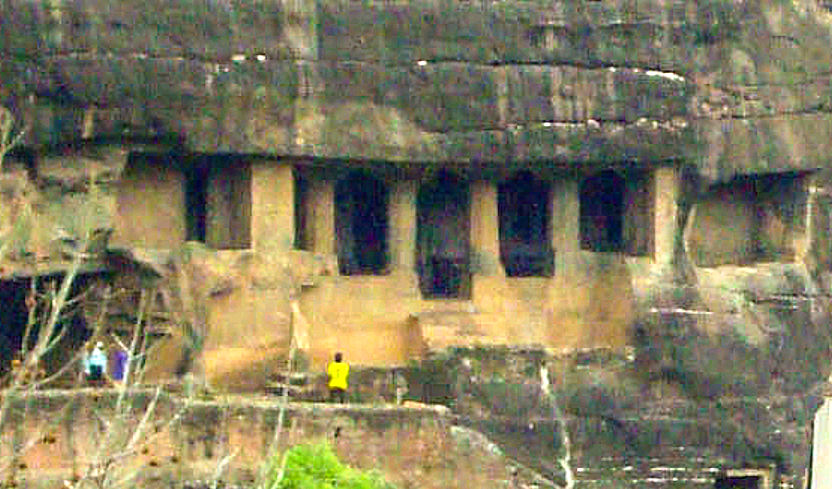
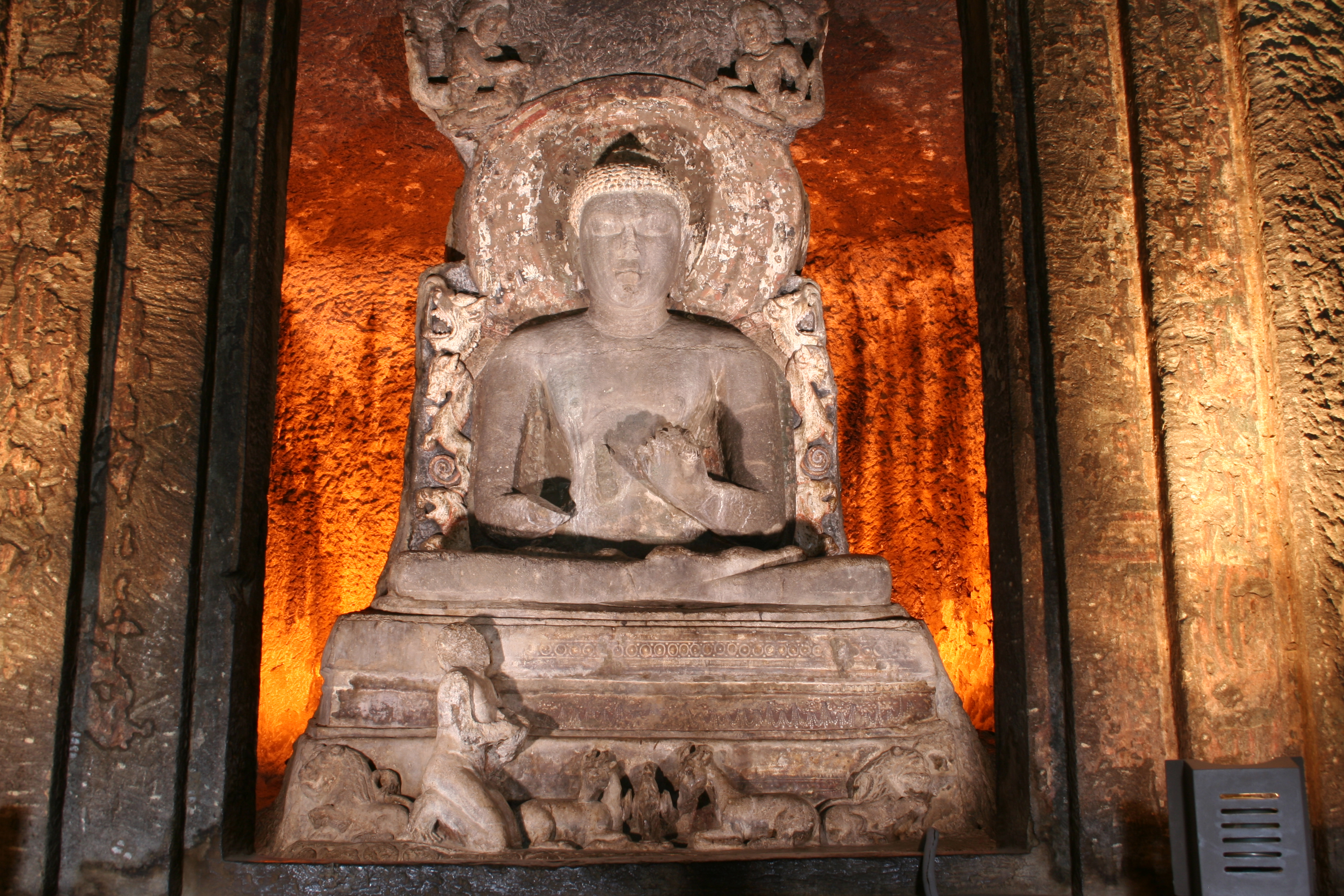
Outside view of Cave 11: Buddha with a kneeling devotee

Cave 11 is a monastery (19.87 × 17.35 m) built during c. 462 to 478. The cave veranda has pillars with octagonal shafts and square bases. The ceiling of the veranda shows evidence of floral designs and eroded reliefs. Only the center panel is discernible wherein the Buddha is seen with votaries lining up to pray before him. Inside, the cave consists of a hall with a long rock bench opening into six rooms. Similar stone benches are found in Nasik Caves. Another pillared verandah ends in a sanctum with seated Buddha against an incomplete stupa, and has four cells.

The cave has a few paintings showing Bodhisattvas and the Buddha. Of these, the Padmapani, a couple gathered to pray, a pair of peafowl, and a female figure painting have survived in the best condition. The sanctum of this cave may be among the last structures built at Ajanta because it features a circumambulation path around the seated Buddha.

== Cave 12 ==
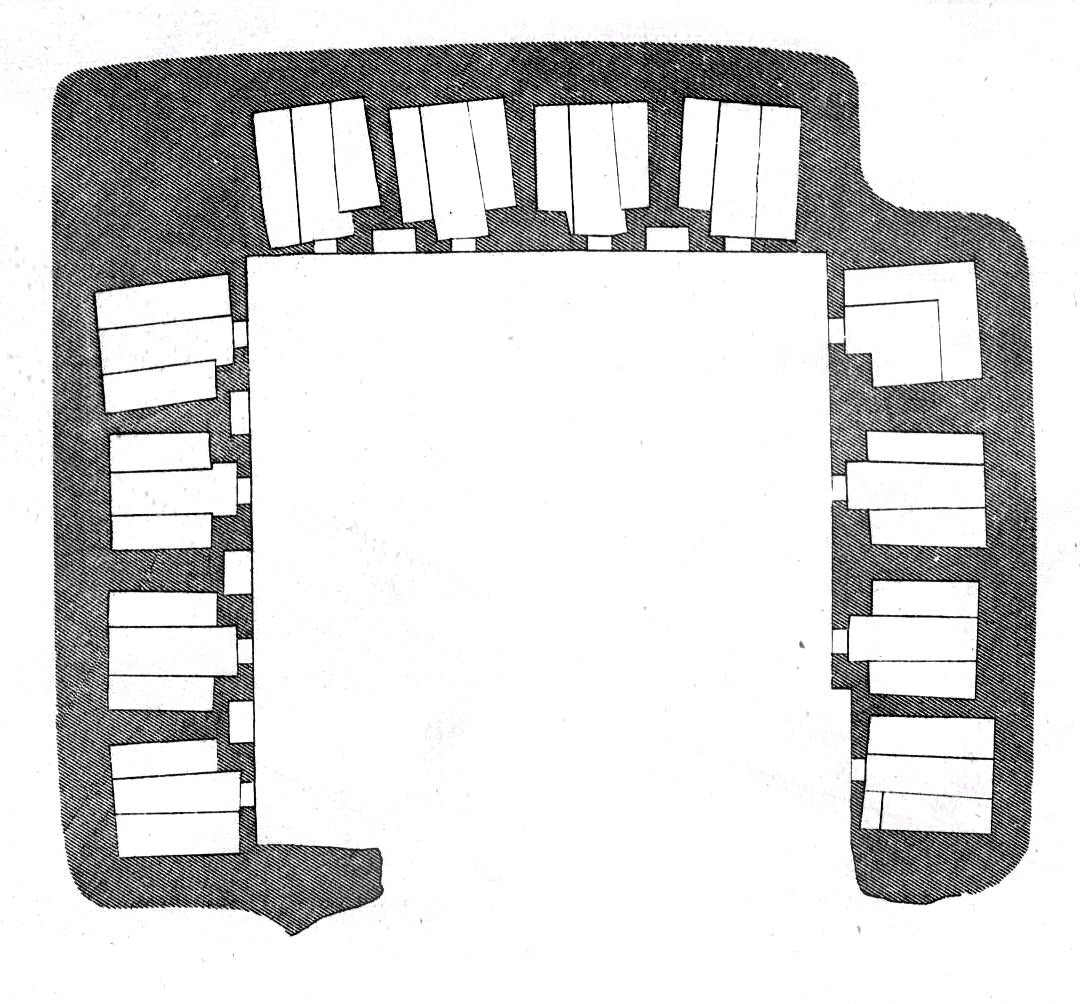
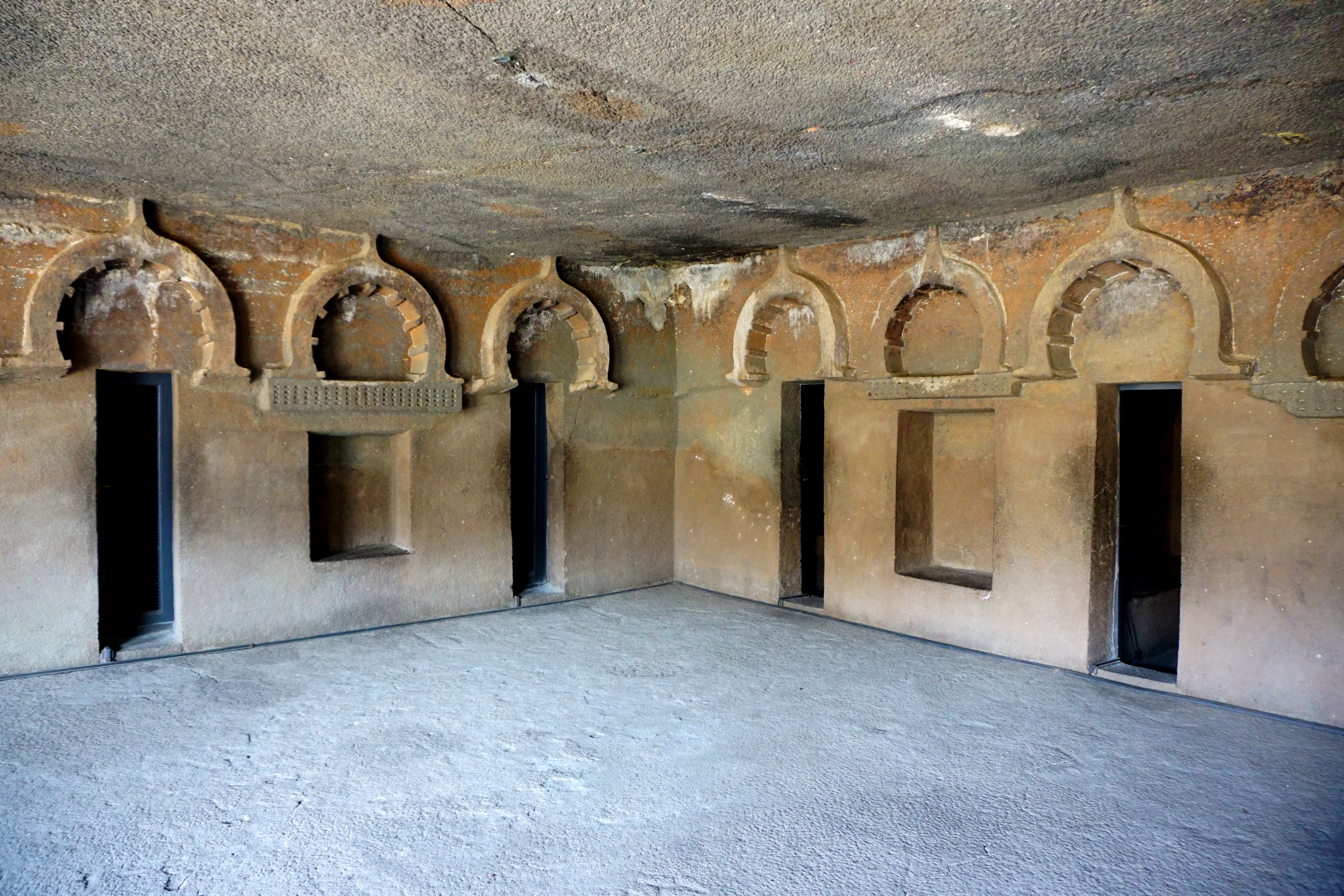
Cave 12 hall, with monk cells. Each cell has two stone beds.

According to Archaeological Survey of India (ASI), Cave 12 is an early stage Hinayana (Theravada) monastery (14.9 × 17.82 m) from the 2nd to 1st century BCE. Spink however only dates it to the 1st century BCE.

The cave is damaged with its front wall completely collapsed. Its three sides inside have twelve cells, each with two stone beds.

== Cave 13 ==
Cave 13 is another small monastery from the early period, consisting of a hall with seven cells, each also with two stone beds, all carved out of the rock. Each cell has rock-cut beds for the monks. In contrast to ASI's estimate, Gupte and Mahajan date both these caves about two to three centuries later, between 1st and 2nd-century CE.

== Cave 14 ==
Cave 14 is another unfinished monastery (13.43 × 19.28 m) but carved above Cave 13. The entrance door frame shows sala bhanjikas.

== Cave 15 ==
Cave 15 is a more complete monastery (19.62 × 15.98 m) with evidence that it had paintings. The cave consists of an eight-celled hall ending in a sanctum, an antechamber and a verandah with pillars. The reliefs show the Buddha, while the sanctum Buddha is shown seated in the Simhasana posture. Cave 15 door frame has carvings of pigeons eating grain.

== Cave 15A ==
Cave 15A is the smallest cave with a hall and one cell on each side. Its entrance is just to the right of the elephant-decorated entrance to Cave 16. It is an ancient Hinayana cave with three cells opening around a minuscule central hall. The doors are decorated with a rail and arch pattern. It had an inscription in an ancient script, which has been lost.

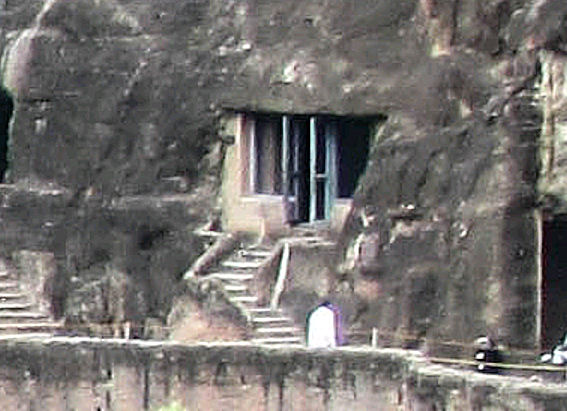
Cave 13

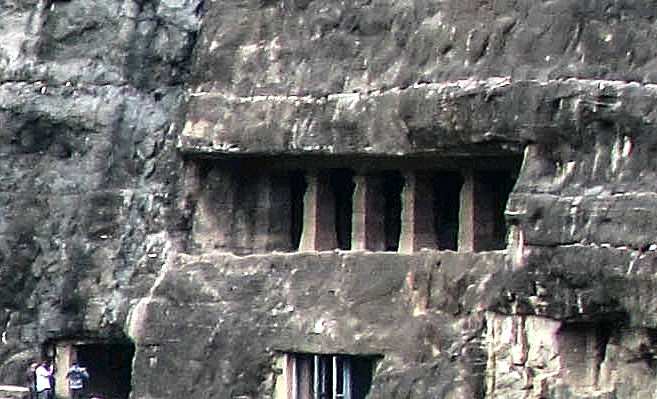
Cave 14

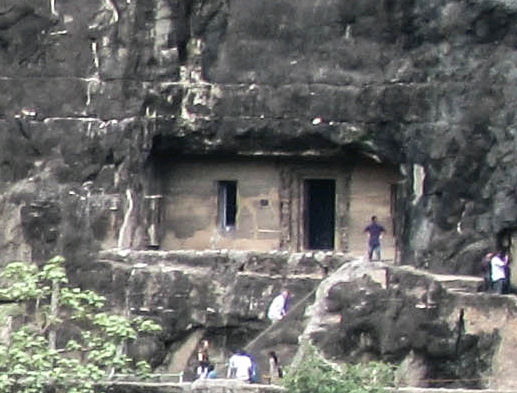
Cave 15

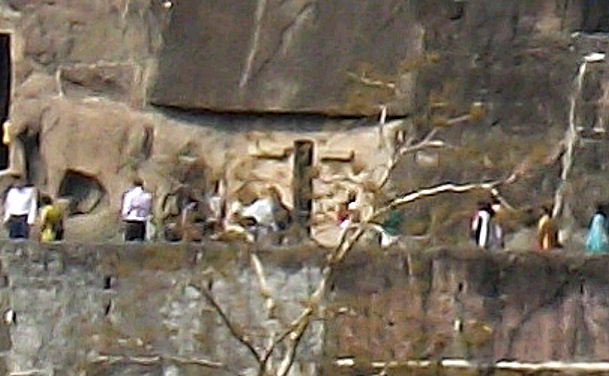
Cave 15A

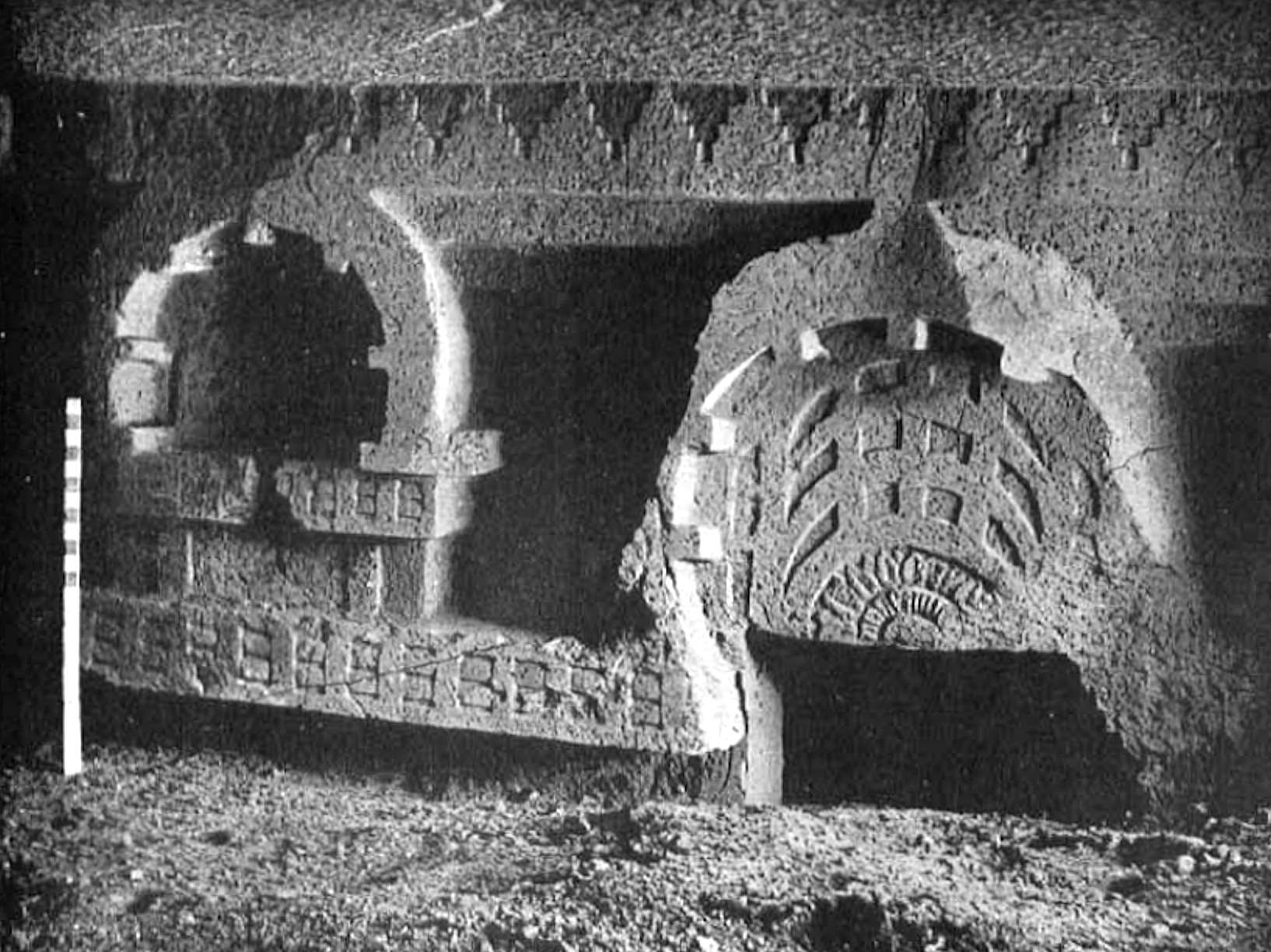
Interior of cave 15A

== Cave 16 ==
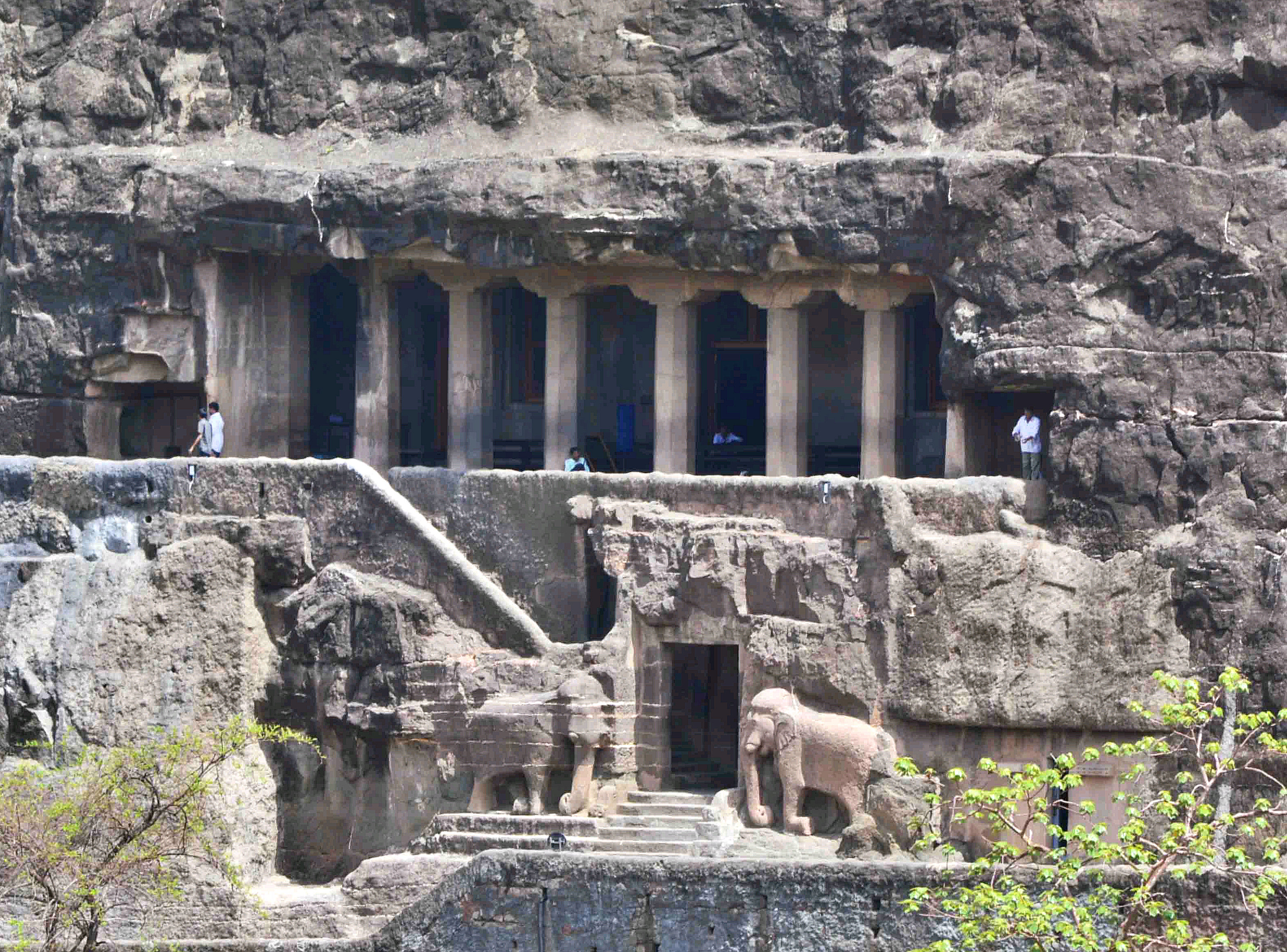
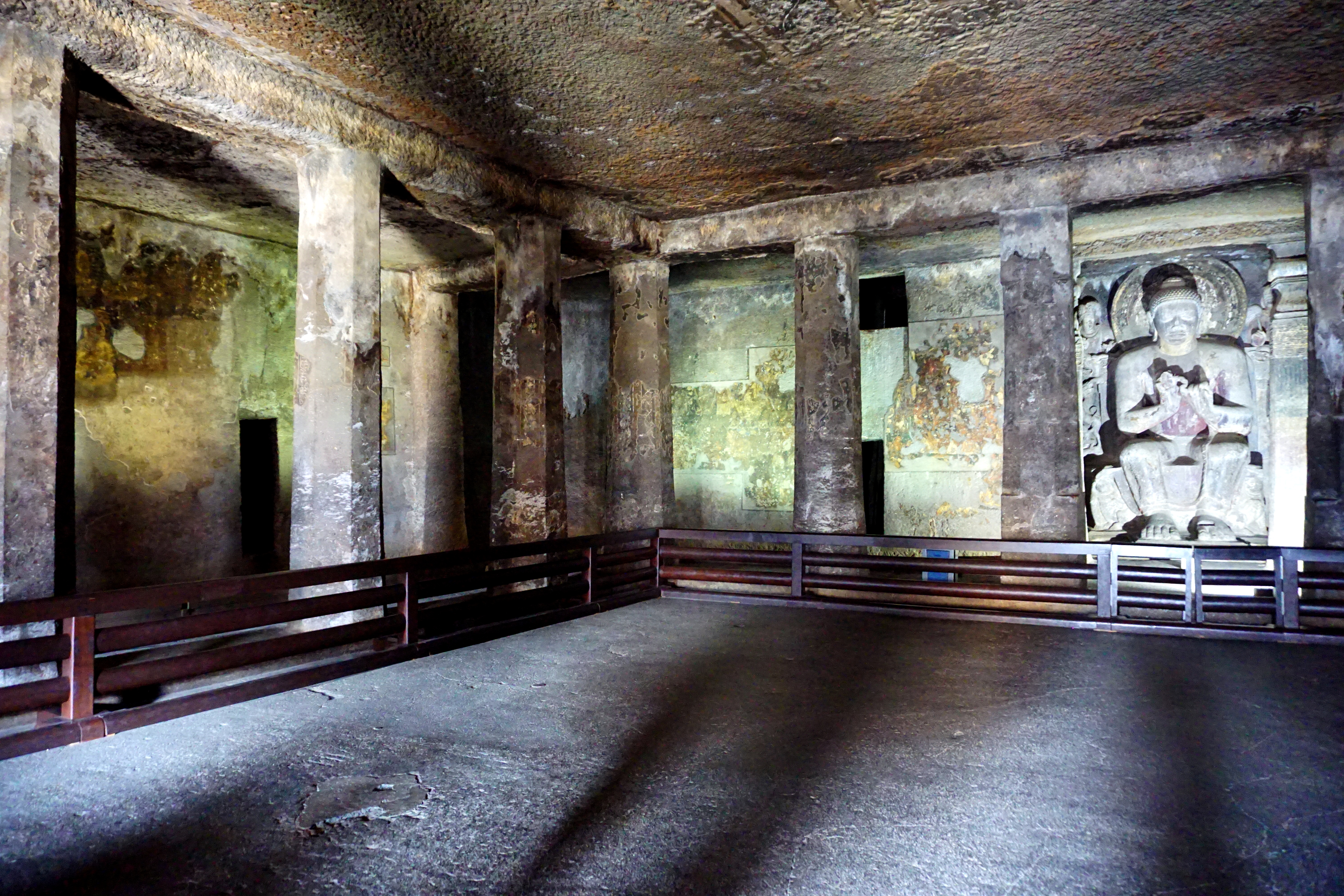
Entrance stairs to the single-storey Cave 16, with stone elephants and front with pillars (left). Inside hall with seated Buddha statue (right).

Cave 16 occupies a prime position near the middle of site, and was sponsored by Varahadeva, minister of Vakataka king Harishena (r. c. 475 – c. 500 CE). He was a follower of Buddhism. He devoted it to the community of monks, with an inscription that expresses his wish, may "the entire world (...) enter that peaceful and noble state free from sorrow and disease" and affirming his devotion to the Buddhist faith: "regarding the sacred law as his only companion, (he was) extremely devoted to the Buddha, the teacher of the world". He was, states Spink, probably someone who revered both the Buddha and the Hindu gods, as he proclaims his Hindu heritage in an inscription in the nearby Ghatotkacha Cave. The 7th-century Chinese traveler Xuan Zang described the cave as the entrance to the site.

Cave 16 (19.5 m × 22.25 m × 4.6 m) influenced the architecture of the entire site. Spink and other scholars call it the "crucial cave" that helps trace the chronology of the second and closing stages of the entire cave's complex construction. Cave 16 is a Mahayana monastery and has the standard arrangement of a main doorway, two windows, and two aisle doorways. The veranda of this monastery is 19.5 m × 3 m, while the main hall is almost a perfect square with 19.5 m side.

Inscription of Varāhadēva
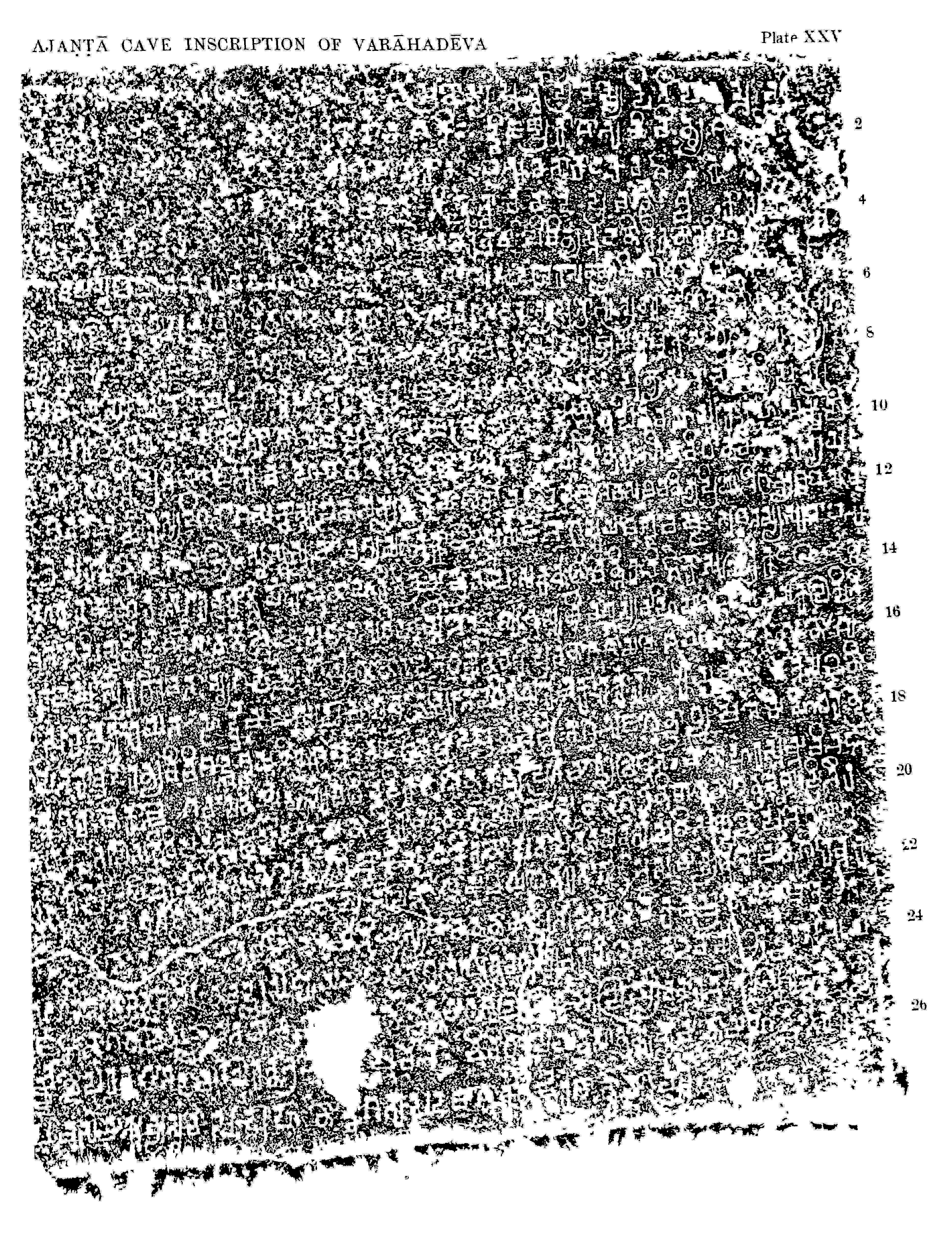
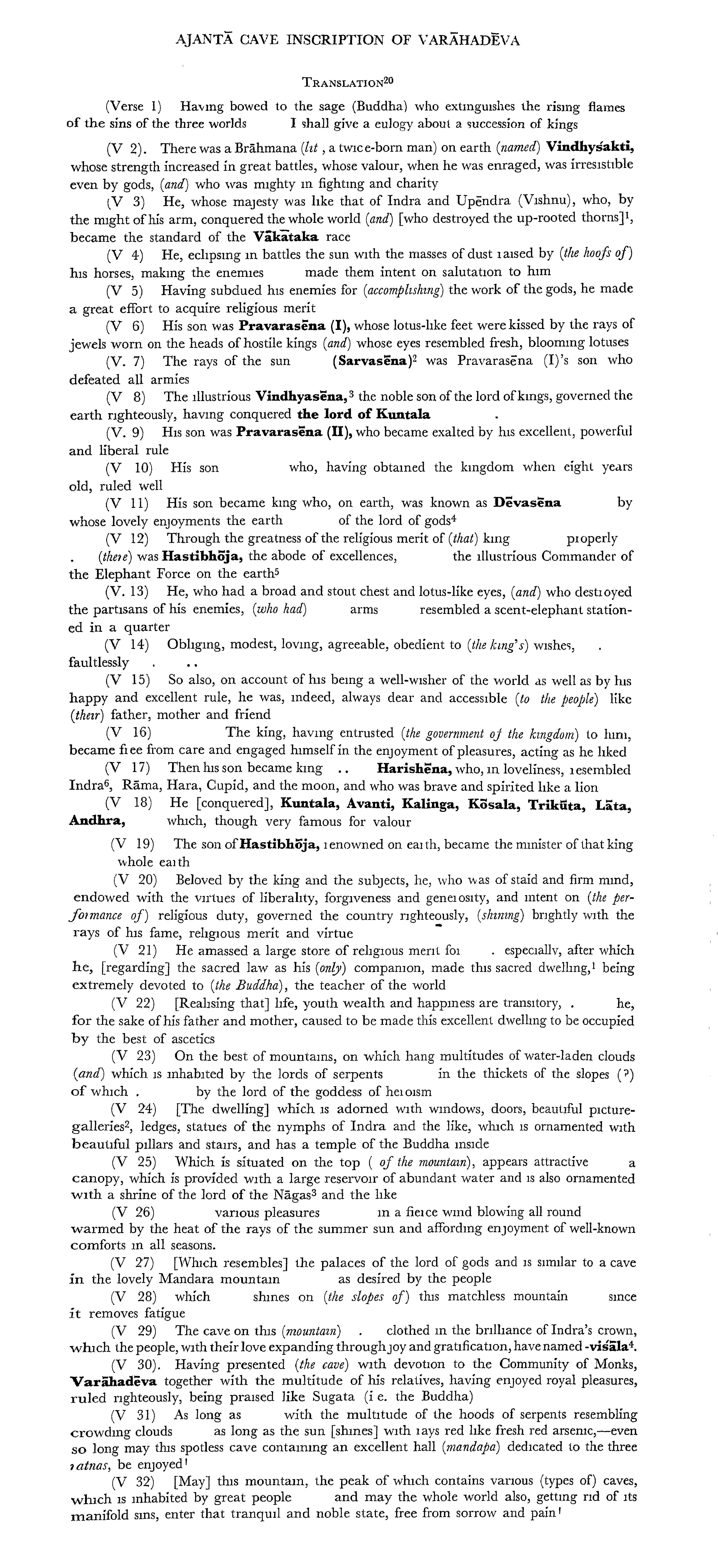
Cave 16 inscription of Varāhadēva, with translation

The paintings in Cave 16 are numerous. Narratives include various Jataka tales such as Hasti, Mahaummagga and the Sutasoma fables. Other frescos depict the conversion of Nanda, miracle of Sravasti, Sujata's offering, Asita's visit, the dream of Maya, the Trapusha and Bhallika story, and the ploughing festival. The Hasti Jataka frescos tell the story of a Bodhisattva elephant who learns of a large group of people starving, then tells them to go below a cliff where they could find food. The elephant proceeds to sacrifice himself by jumping off that cliff thereby becoming food so that the people can survive. (Note: Similar morals and virtue-defining fables are also found in Jainism and Hinduism, in texts such as the Panchatantra. The antiquity of these tales has been a subject of scholarly debate. The pictorial narrative in Ajanta Caves attests to their influence by the 5th century. In some cases such as the Sibi and Hasti Jataka, the Ajanta friezes more closely match the version of the same fables found in Hindu or Jain texts, suggesting a common root and shared heritage.) These frescos are found immediately to the left of entrance, in the front corridor and the narrative follows a clockwise direction.

The Mahaummagga Jataka frescos are found on the left wall of the corridor, which narrates the story of a child Bodhisattva. Thereafter, in the left corridor is the legend surrounding the conversion of Nanda – the half brother of the Buddha. The story depicted is one of the two major versions of the Nanda legend in the Buddhist tradition, one where Nanda wants to lead a sensuous life with the girl he had just wed and the Buddha takes him to heaven and later hell to show the spiritual dangers of a sensual life. After the Nanda-related frescos, the cave presents Manushi Buddhas, followed by flying votaries with offerings to worship the Buddha and the Buddha seated in teaching asana and dharma chakra mudra.

The right wall of the corridor show the scenes from the life of the Buddha. These include Sujata offering food to the Buddha with a begging bowl in white dress, Tapussa and Bhalluka next to the Buddha after they offering wheat and honey to the Buddha as monk, the future Buddha sitting alone under a tree, and the Buddha at a ploughing festival. One mural shows Buddha's parents trying to dissuade him from becoming a monk. Another shows the Buddha at the palace surrounded by men in dhoti and women in sari as his behavior presents the four signs that he is likely to renounce. On this side of the corridor are also paintings that show the future Buddha as a baby with sage Asita with rishi-like looks. According to Spink, some of the Cave 16 paintings were left incomplete.

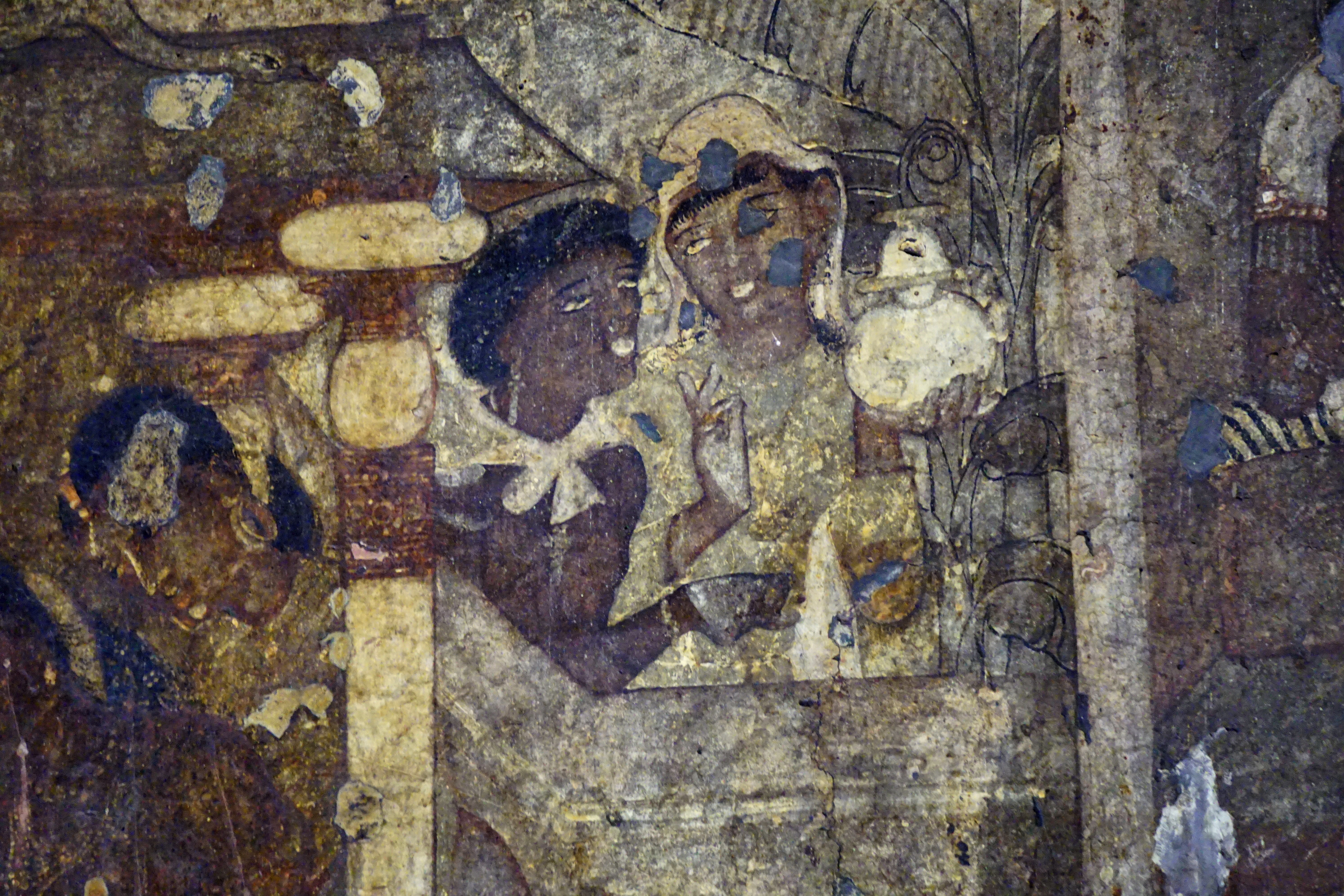
The conversion of sensuality-driven Nanda to Buddhism, left corridor

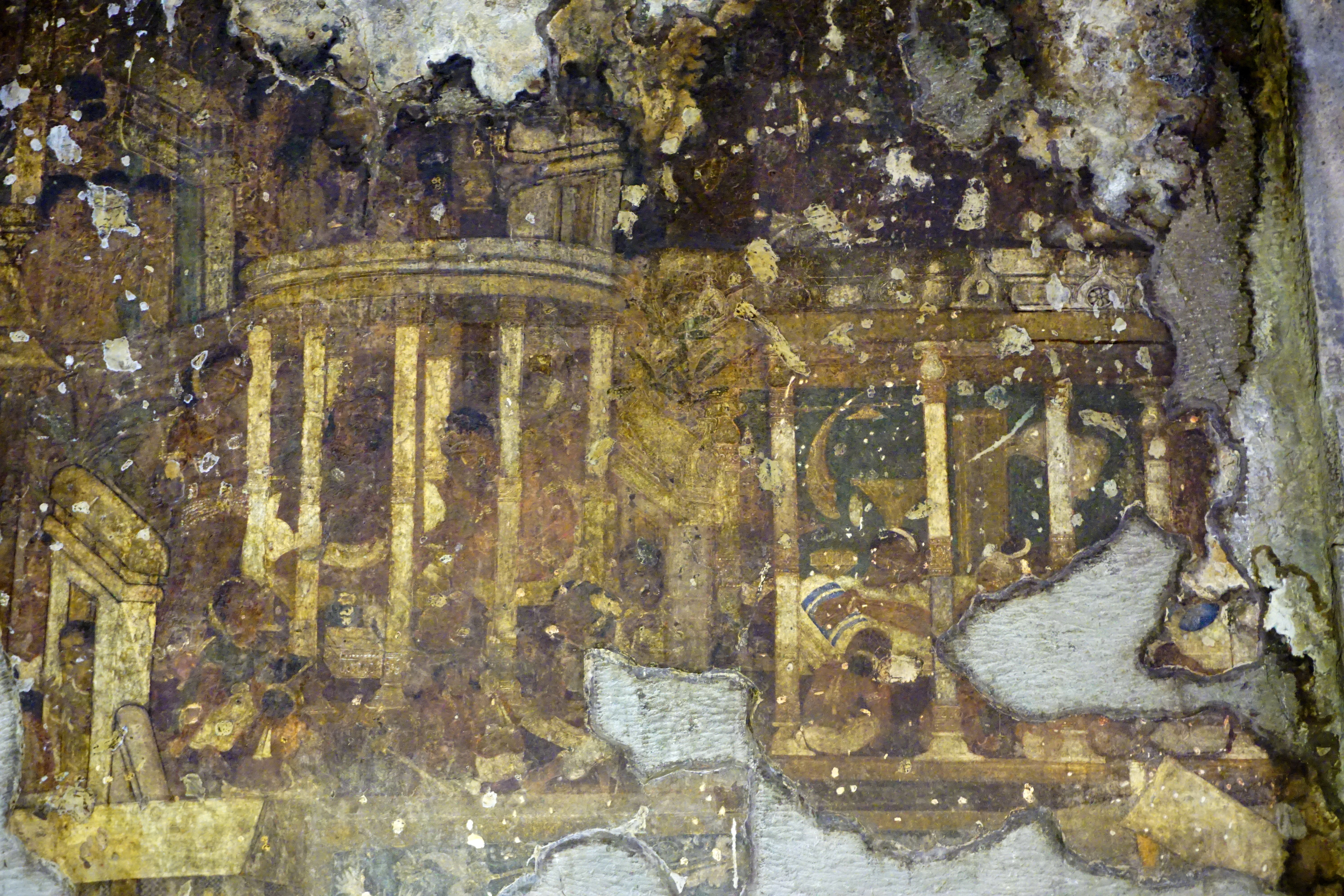
Palace scene fresco, right corridor of Cave 16

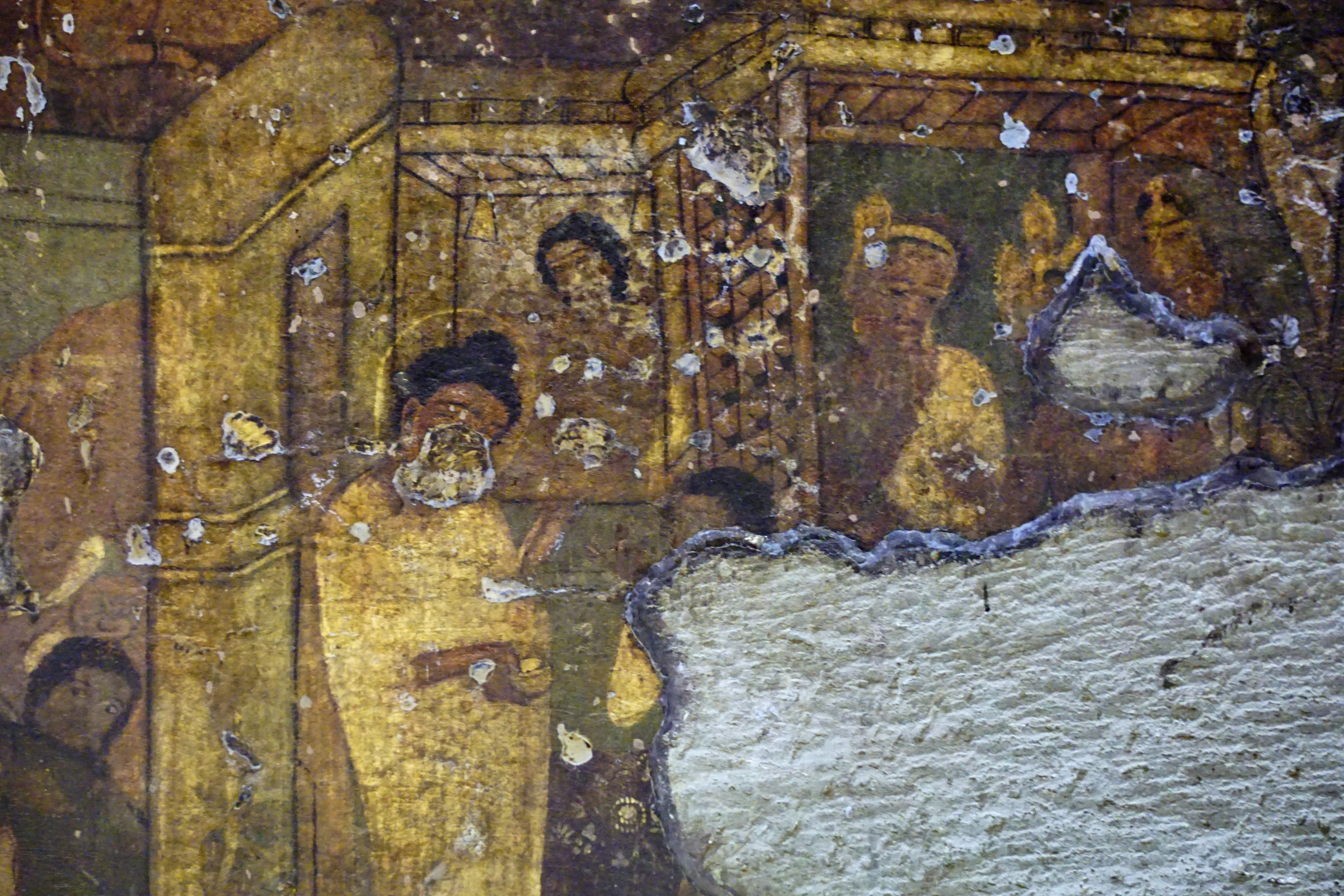
The Buddha in asceticism stage, getting sweet milk-rice from Sujata

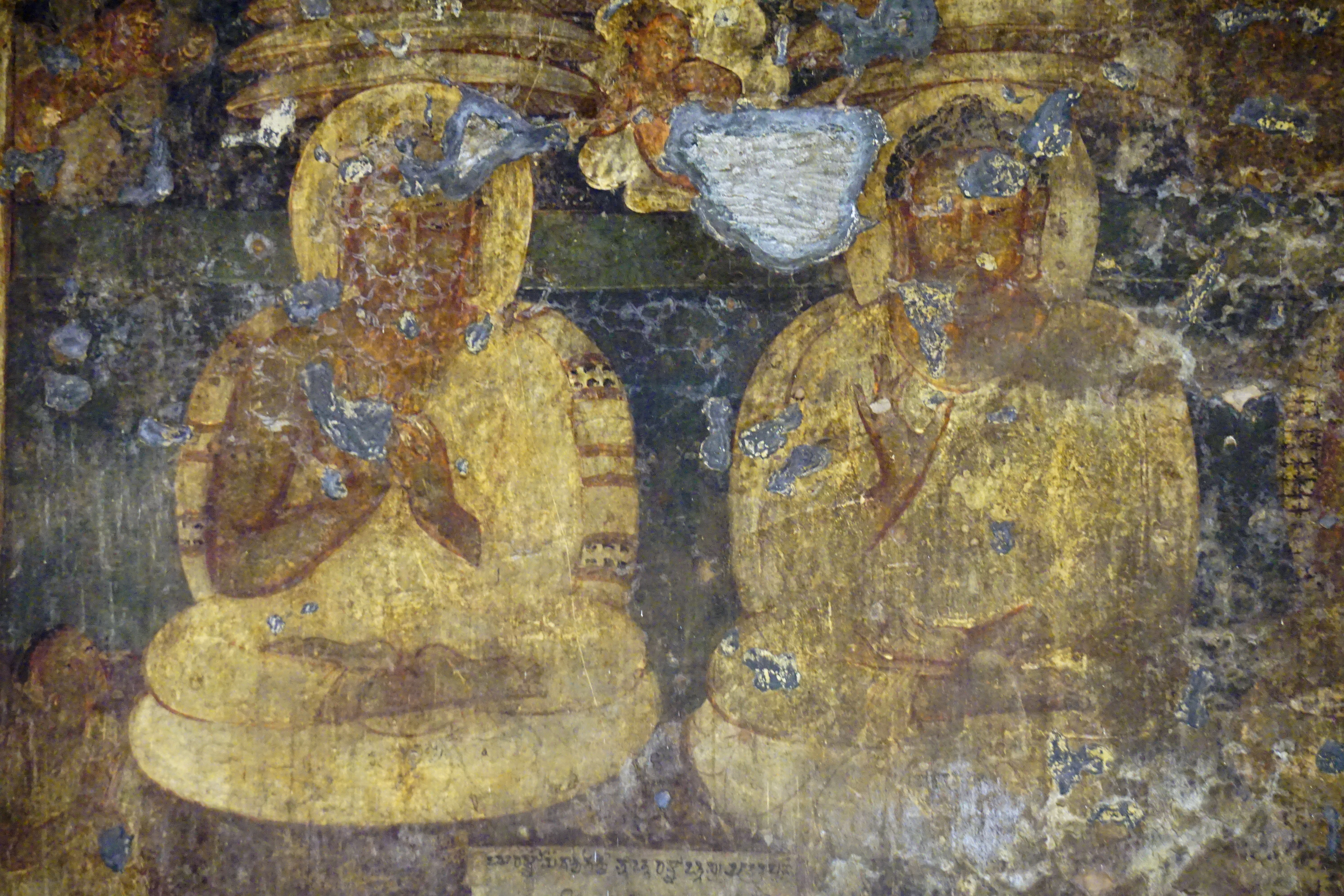
Manushi Buddhas painting in Cave 16

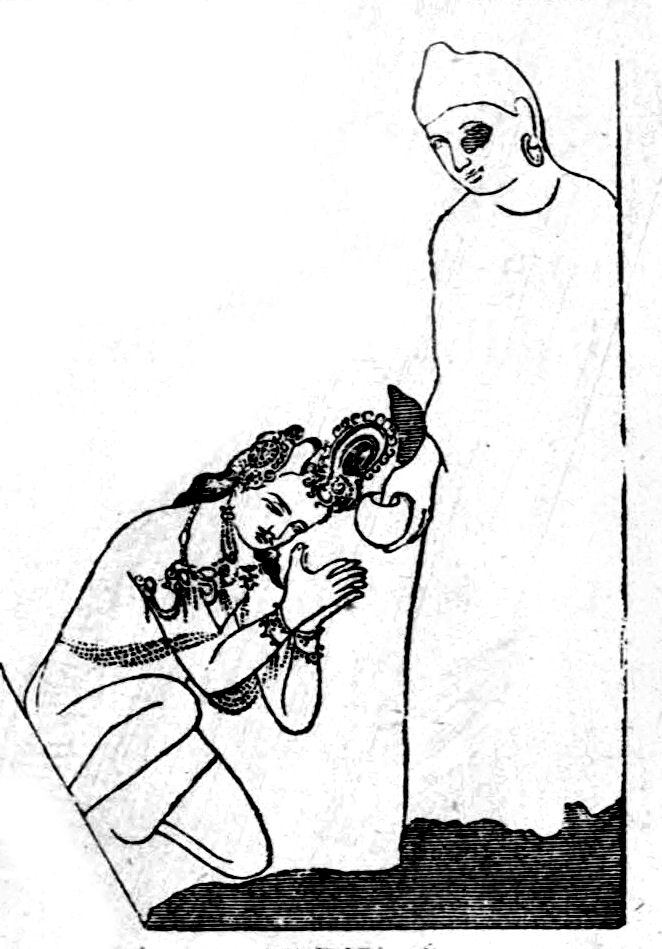
Cave 16: king paying homage to the Buddha

== Cave 17 ==
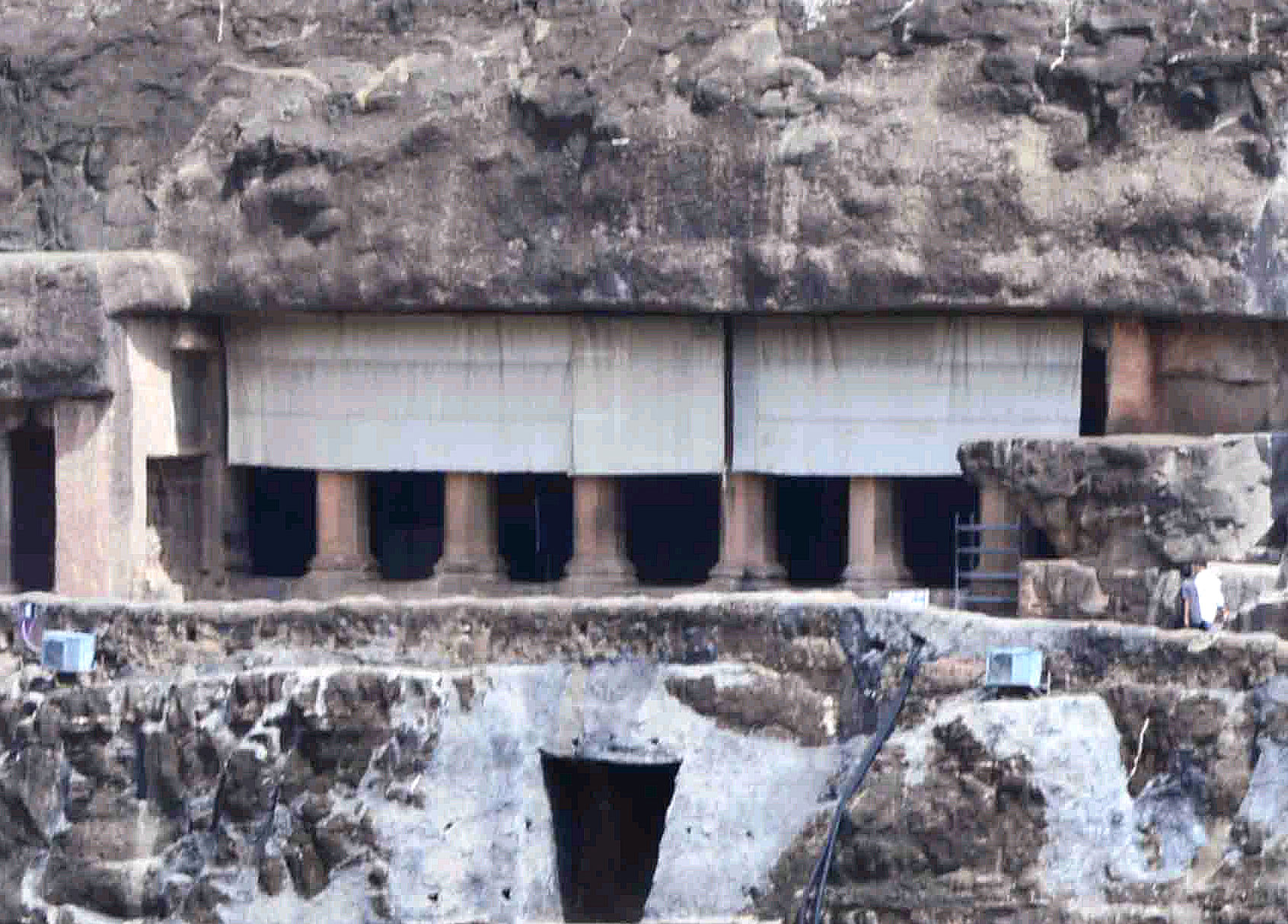
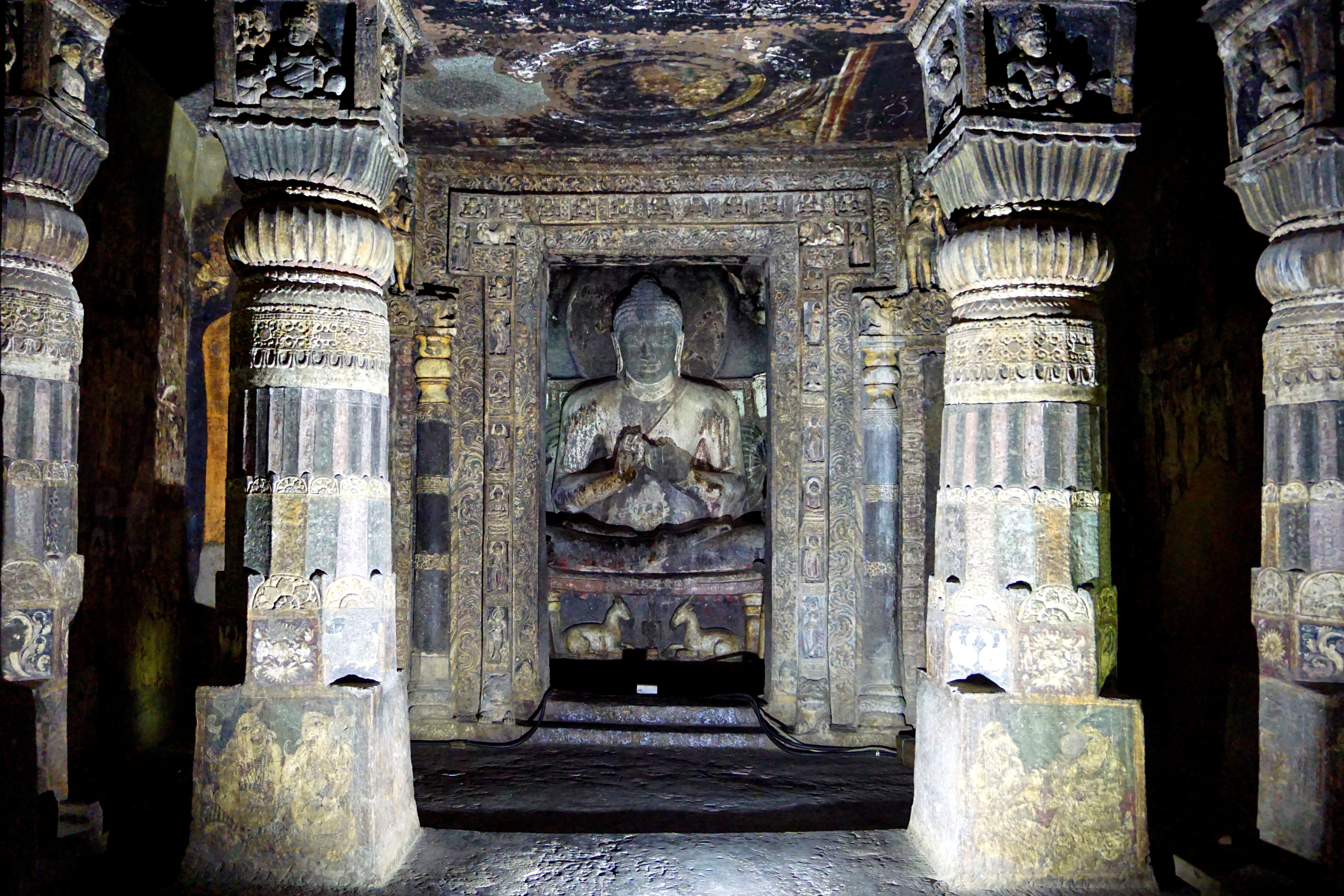
Cave 17: exterior view and inside hall with seated Buddha statue

Cave 17 (34.5 m × 25.63 m) along with Cave 16 with two great stone elephants at the entrance and Cave 26 with sleeping Buddha, were some of the many caves sponsored by the Hindu Vakataka prime minister Varahadeva. Cave 17 had additional donors such as the local king Upendragupta, as evidenced by the inscription therein.

The cave features a large and most sophisticated vihara design, along with some of the best-preserved and well-known paintings of all the caves. While Cave 16 is known for depicting the life stories of the Buddha, the Cave 17 paintings has attracted much attention for extolling human virtues by narrating the Jataka tales. The narration includes attention to details and a realism which Stella Kramrisch calls "lavish elegance" accomplished by efficient craftsmen. The ancient artists, states Kramrisch, tried to show wind passing over a crop by showing it bending in waves, and a similar profusion of rhythmic sequences that unroll story after story, visually presenting the metaphysical.

Inscription of Cave 17
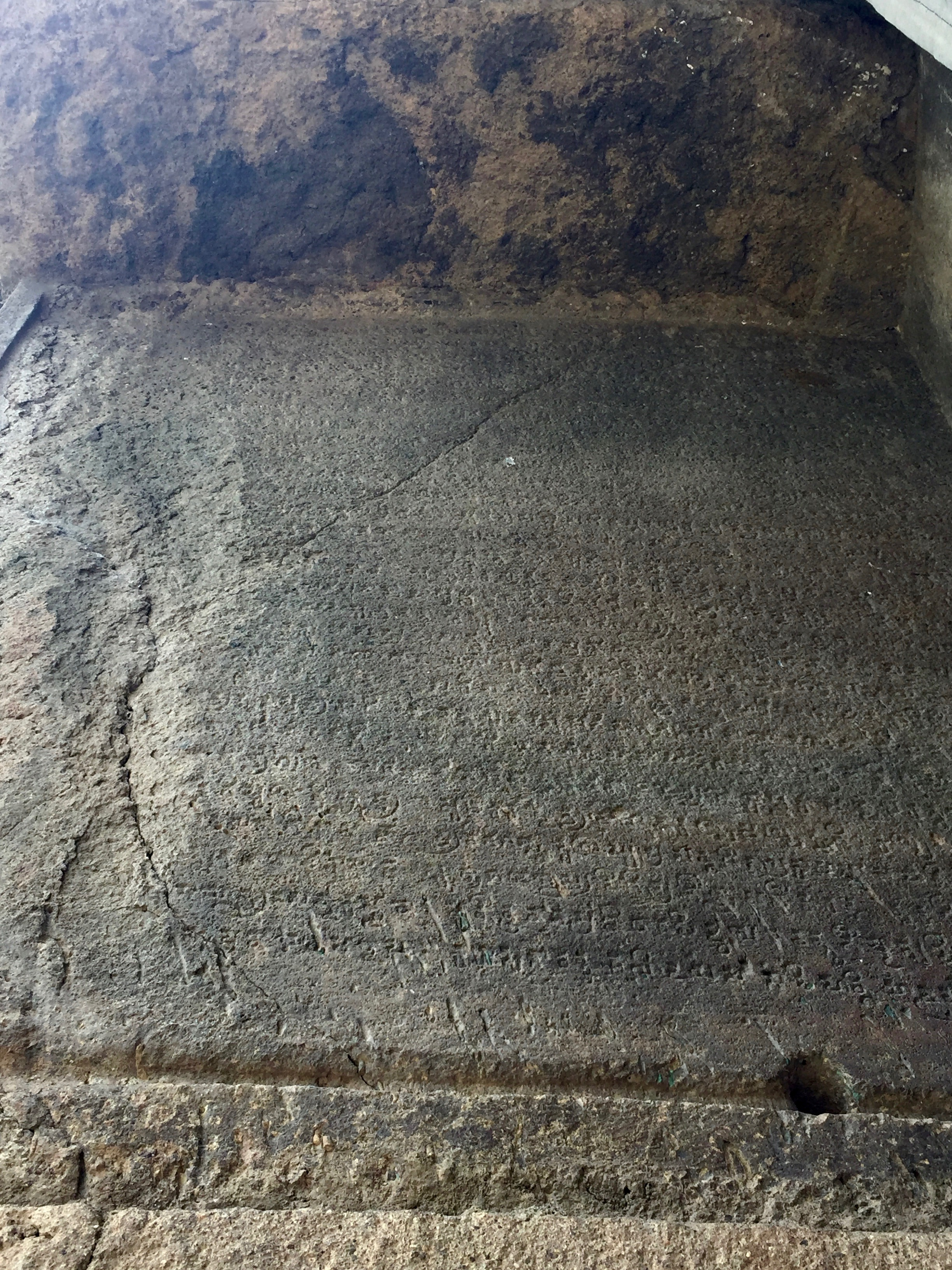
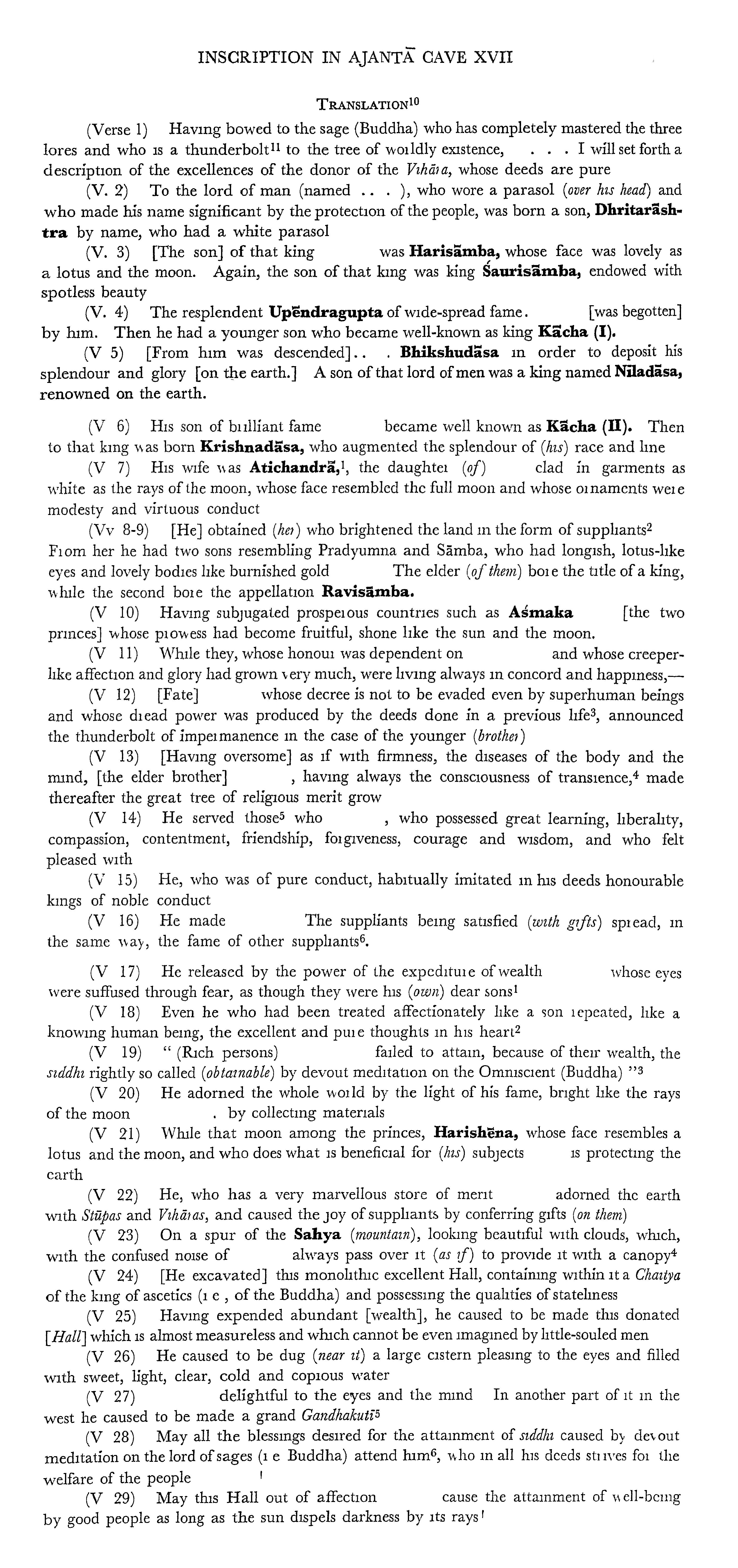
Inscription of Cave 17, with translation

The Cave 17 monastery includes a colonnaded porch, a number of pillars each with a distinct style, a peristyle design for the interior hall, a shrine antechamber located deep in the cave, larger windows and doors for more light, along with extensive integrated carvings of Indian gods and goddesses. The hall of this monastery is a 380.53 square metres (4,096.0 sq ft) square, with 20 pillars. The grand scale of the carving also introduced errors of taking out too much rock to shape the walls, states Spink, which led to the cave being splayed out toward the rear.

Cave 17 has one long inscription by king Upendragupta, in which he explains that he has "expended abundant wealth" on building this vihara, bringing much satisfaction to the devotees. Altogether, Upendragupta is known to have sponsored at least 5 of the caves in Ajanta. He may have spent too much wealth on religious pursuits however, as he was ultimately defeated by the attacks of the Asmaka.

Cave 17 has thirty major murals. The paintings of Cave 17 depict Buddha in various forms and postures – Vipasyi, Sikhi, Visvbhu, Krakuchchanda, Kanakamuni, Kashyapa and Sakyamuni. Also depicted are Avalokitesvara, the story of Udayin and Gupta, the story of Nalagiri, the Wheel of life, a panel celebrating various ancient Indian musicians and a panel that tells the tales of Prince Simhala's expedition to Sri Lanka. The narrative frescos depict the various Jataka tales such as the Shaddanta, Hasti, Hamsa, Vessantara, Sutasoma, Mahakapi (in two versions), Sarabhamiga, Machchha, Matiposaka, Shyama, Mahisha, Valahassa, Sibi, Ruru and Nigrodamiga Jatakas. The depictions weave in the norms of the early 1st millennium culture and the society. They show themes as diverse as a shipwreck, a princess applying makeup, lovers in scenes of dalliance, and a wine drinking scene of a couple with the woman and man amorously seated. Some frescos attempt to show the key characters from various parts of a Jataka tale by co-depicting animals and attendants in the same scene.

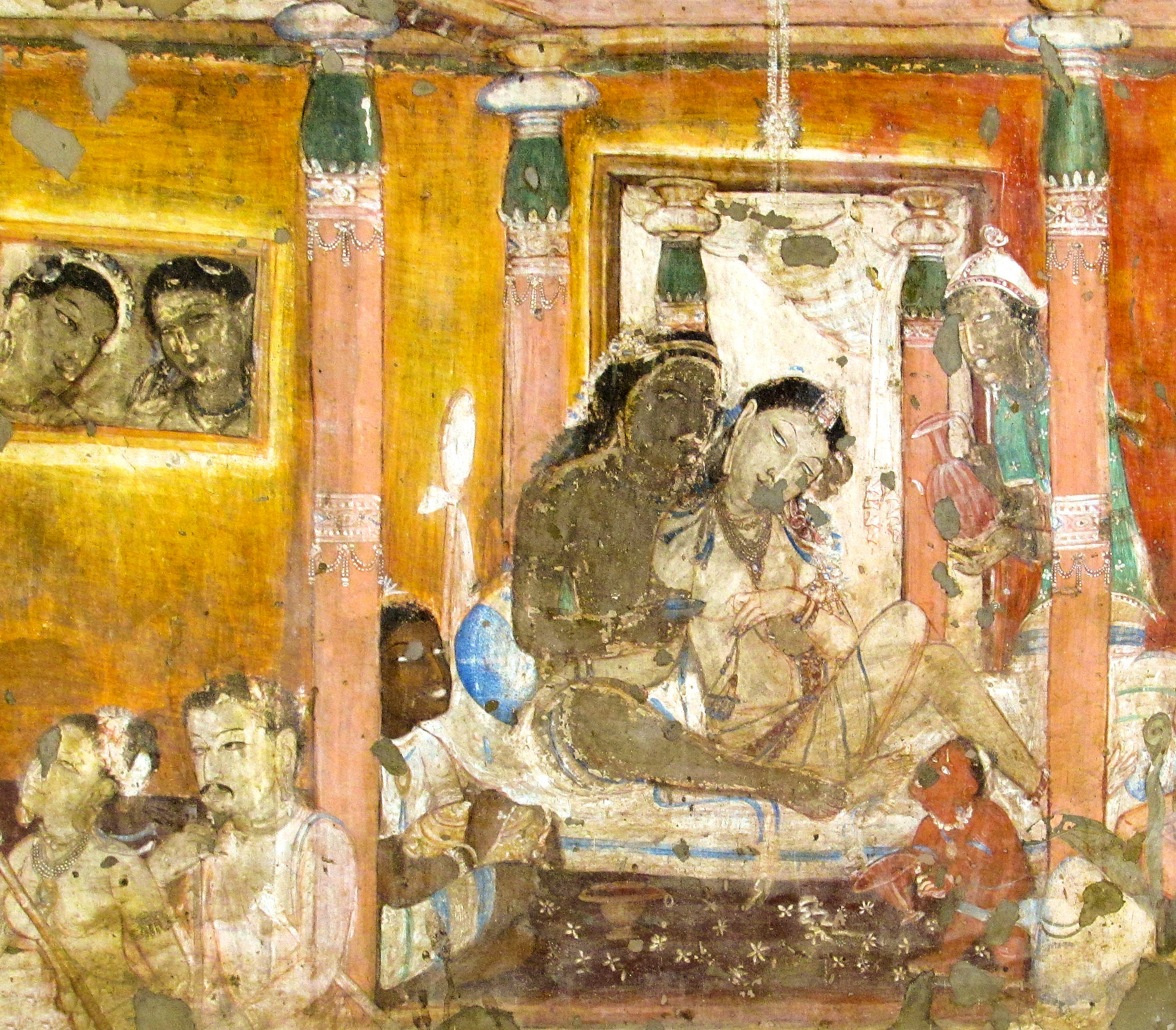
Vessantara Jataka: the story of the generous king Vessantara

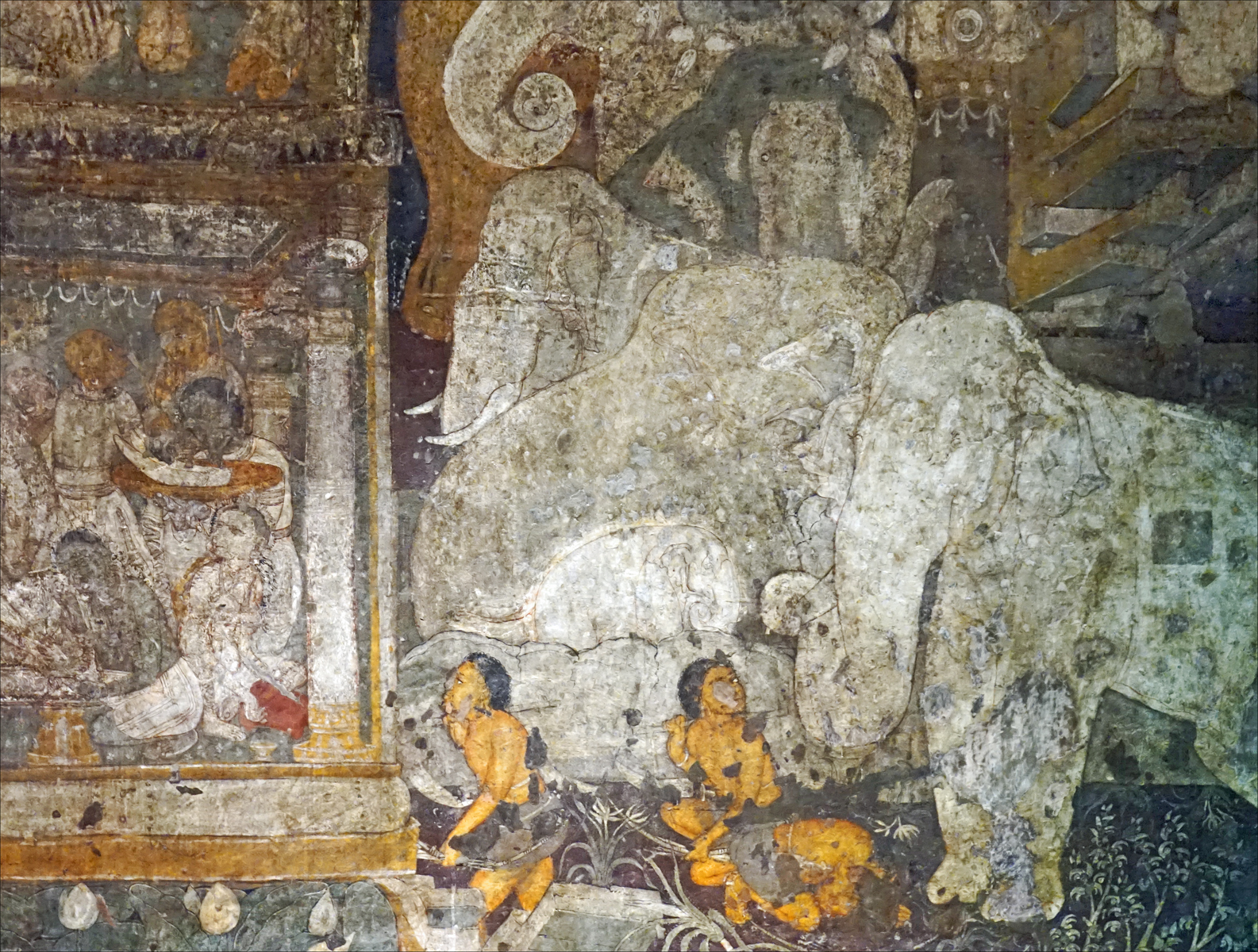
Shaddanta Jataka: six-tusked elephant giving away his tusks

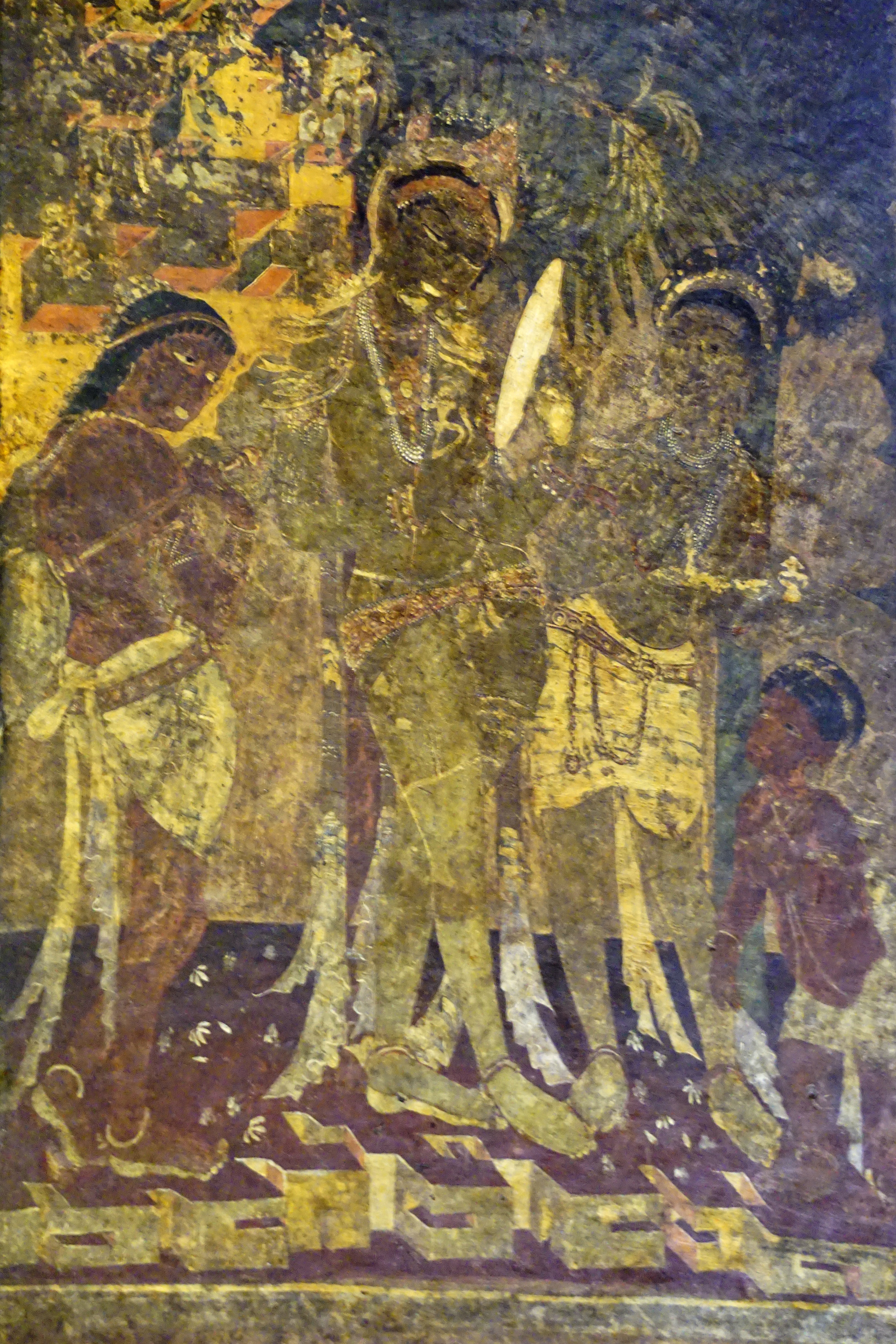
Painting depicting "Darpana Sundari", a lady with a mirror

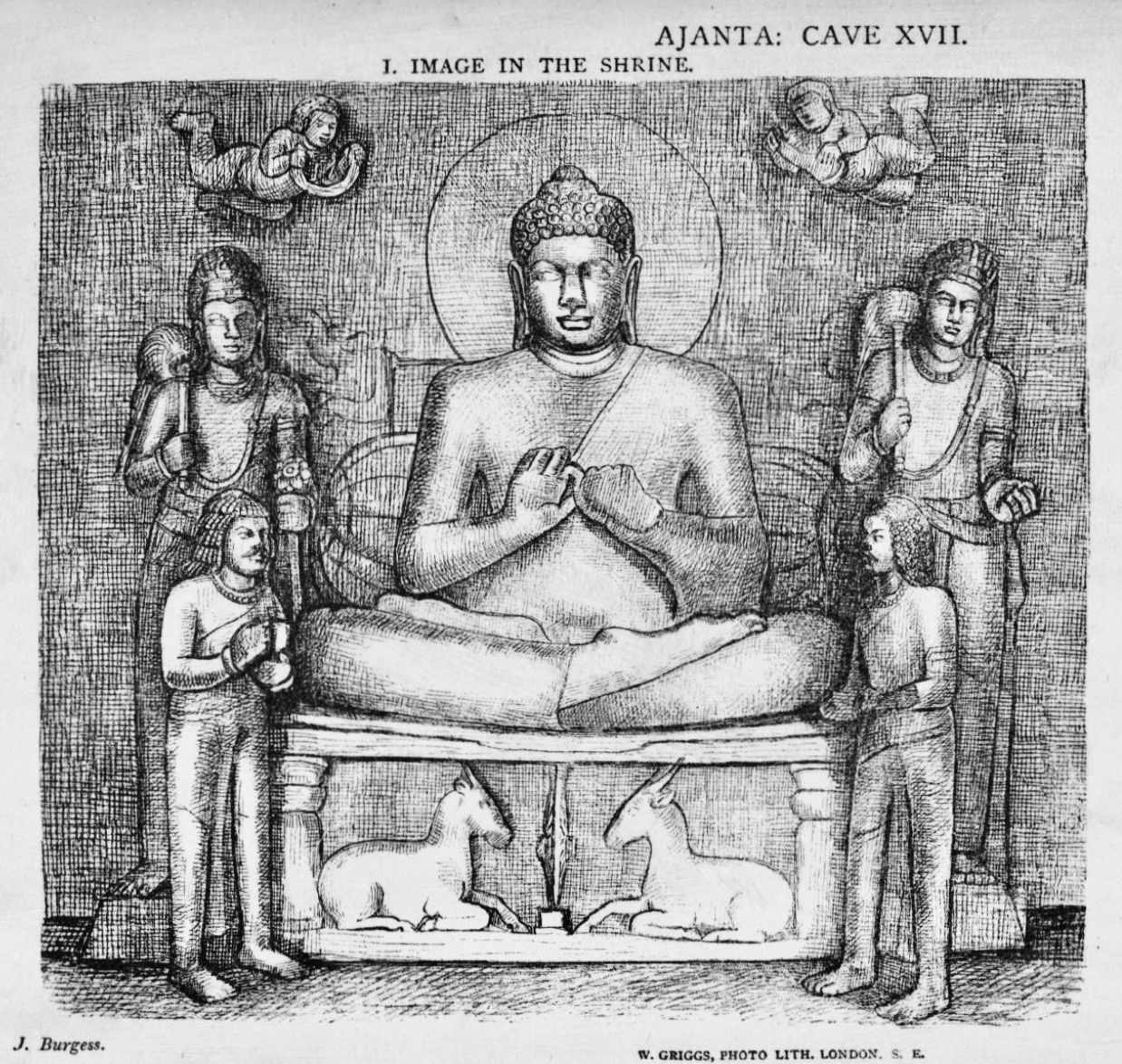
The Buddha in Cave 17 sanctum

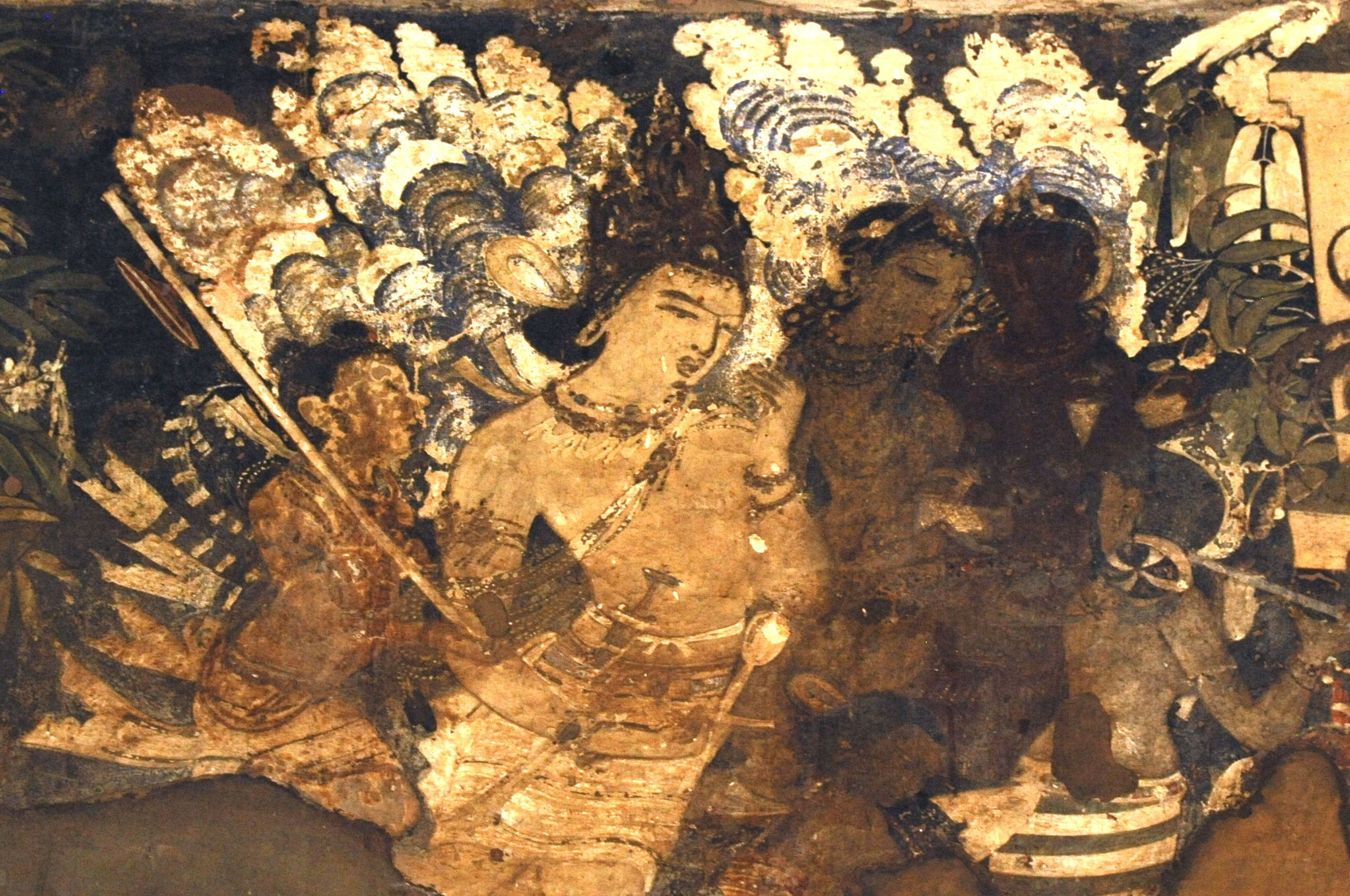
Musician with Alapini Vina (far left), next to Indra.

== Cave 18 ==
Cave 18 is a small rectangular space (3.38 × 11.66 m) with two octagonal pillars and it joins another cell. Its role is unclear.

== Cave 19 (5th century CE) ==
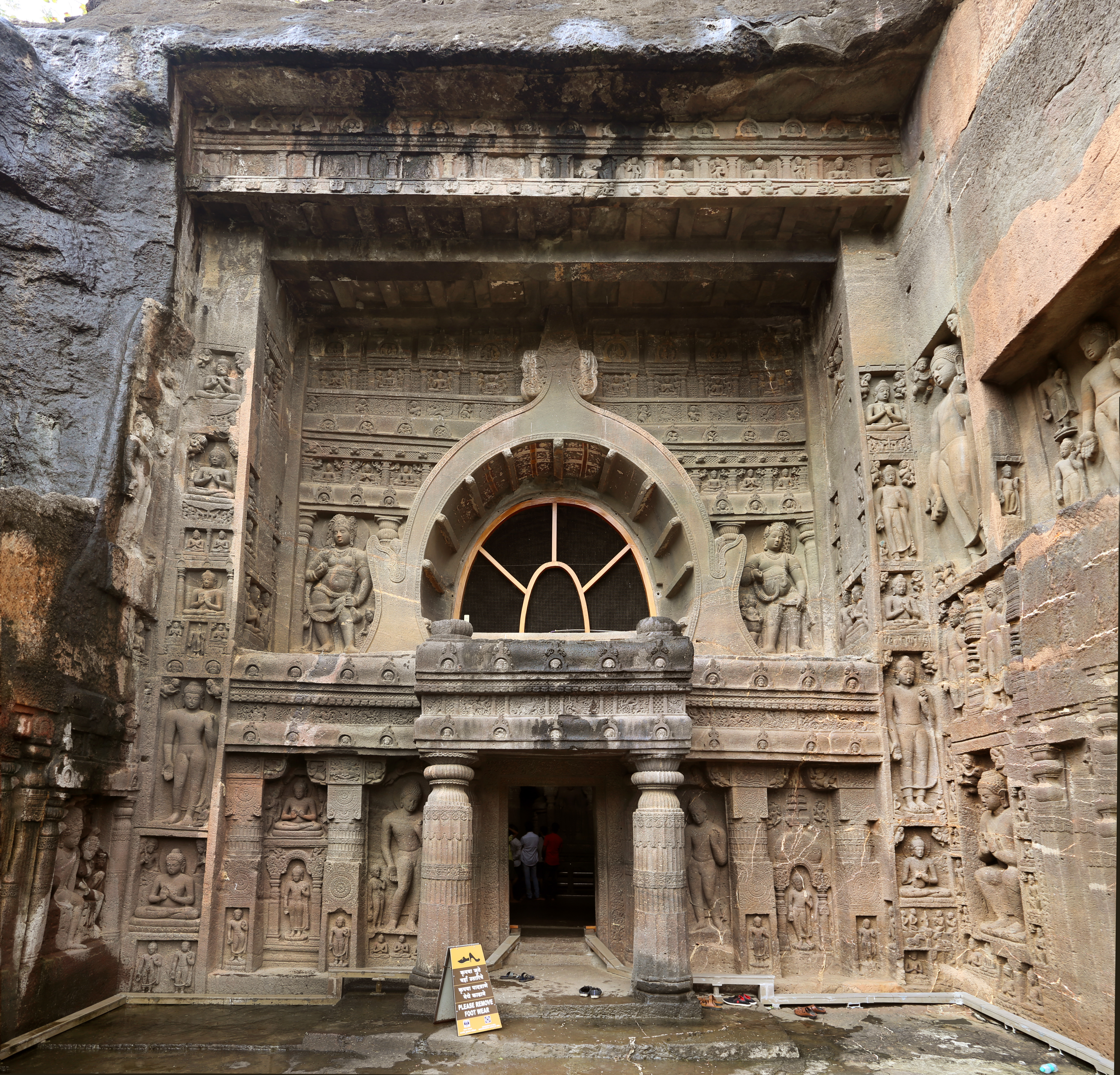
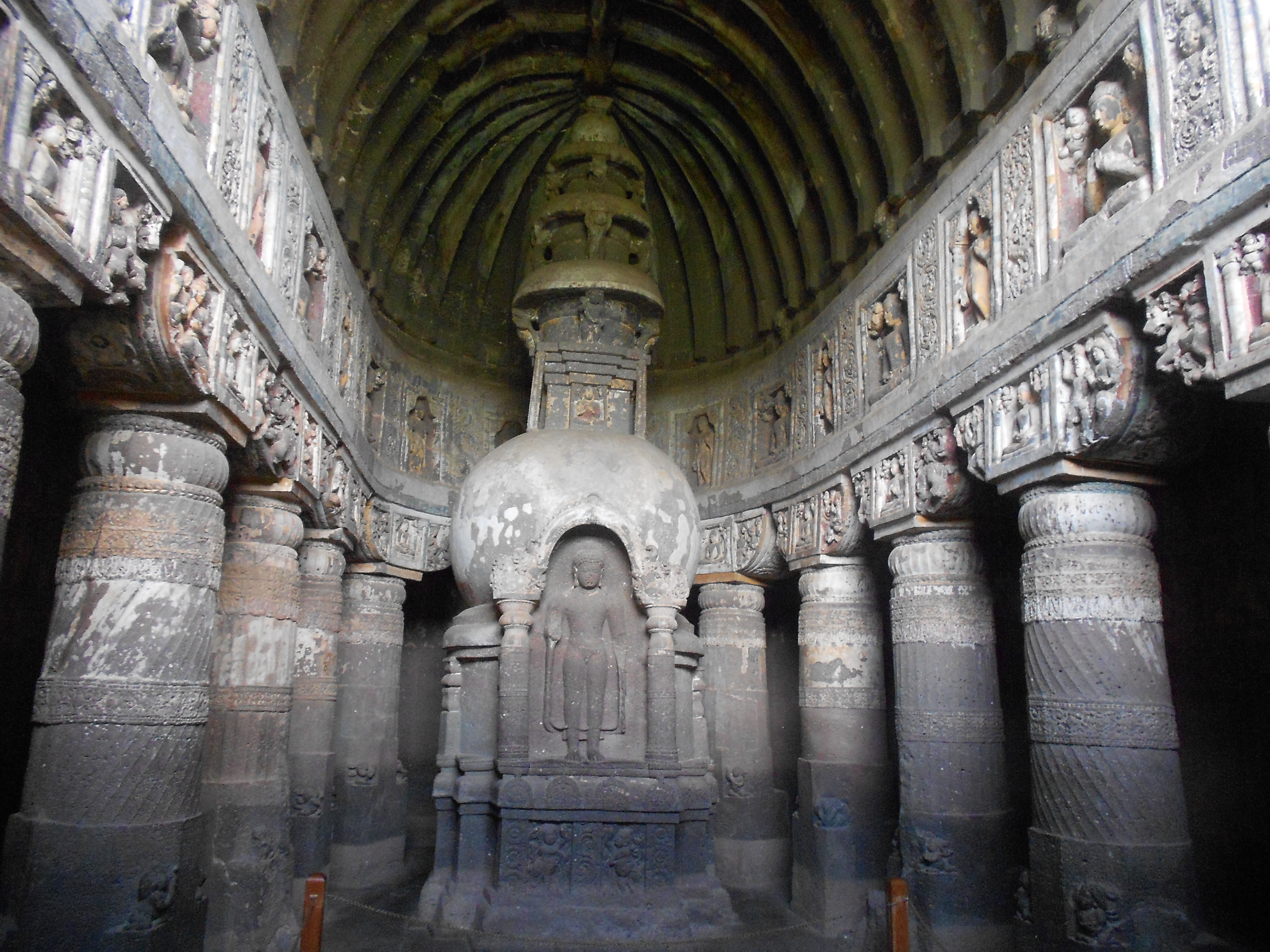
Entrance façade and inside worship hall, Cave 19, sponsored by king Upendragupta.

Cave 19 is a worship hall (chaitya griha, 16.05 × 7.09 m) datable to the fifth century CE. The hall shows painted Buddha, depicted in different postures. This worship hall is now visited through what was previously a carved room. The presence of this room before the hall suggests that the original plan included a mandala style courtyard for devotees to gather and wait, an entrance and facade to this courtyard, all of whose ruins are now lost to history. Cave 19 is one of the caves known for its sculpture. It includes Naga figures with a serpent canopy protecting the Buddha, similar to those found for spiritual icons in the ancient Jain and Hindu traditions. It includes Yaksha dwarapala (guardian) images on the side of its vetayana (arches), flying couples, sitting Buddha, standing Buddhas and evidence that its ceiling was once painted.

Cave 19 drew upon on the plan and experimentation in Cave 9. It made a major departure from the earlier Hinayana tradition, by carving a Buddha into the stupa, a decision that states Spink must have come from "the highest levels" in the 5th-century Mahayana Buddhist establishment because the king and dynasty that built this cave was from the Shaivism Hindu tradition. Cave 19 excavation and stupa was likely in place by 467 CE, and its finishing and artistic work continued into the early 470s, but it too was an incomplete cave when it was dedicated in 471 CE.

The entrance facade of the Cave 19 worship hall is ornate. Two round pillars with fluted floral patterns and carved garlands support a porch. Its capital is an inverted lotus connecting to an amalaka. To its left is standing Buddha in varada hasta mudra with a devotee prostrating at his feet. On right is a relief of woman with one hand holding a pitcher and other touching her chin. Above is a seated Buddha in meditating mudra. Towards the right of the entrance is the "Mother and Child" sculpture. (Note: The "Mother and Child" theme is found in other caves, such as in the painting of Cave 17. These show the father Buddha with a begging bowl, with his son and wife looking up to him. Some show a towering figure of the Buddha looking below, with a small inset with the mother and child looking up. These images are interpreted as they offering food to him, or alternatively as the Buddha giving his son the begging bowl as his inheritance. The artwork signifies the belief that human values and spirituality is highest exchange across human generations.) A figure with begging bowl is the Buddha, watching him are his wife and son.

The worship hall is apsidal, with 15 pillars dividing it into two side aisles and one nave. The round pillars have floral reliefs and a fluted shaft topped with Buddha in its capitals. Next, to the Buddha in the capitals are elephants, horses and flying apsara friezes found elsewhere in India, reflecting the style of the Gupta Empire artwork. According to Sharma, the similarities at the Karla Caves Great Chaitya, built in the 2nd century CE, suggest that Cave 19 may have been modeled after it.

The walls and the ceiling of the side aisles inside the worship hall are covered with paintings. These show the Buddha, flowers, and in the left aisle the "Mother and Child" legend again.

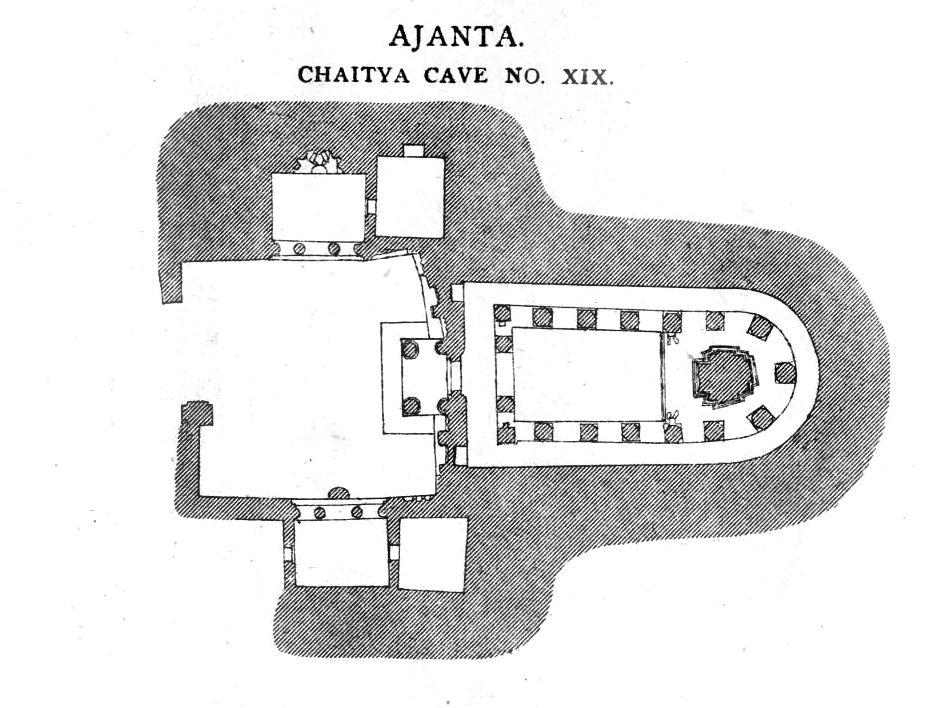
Cave 19 plan suggests that it once had a courtyard and additional artwork

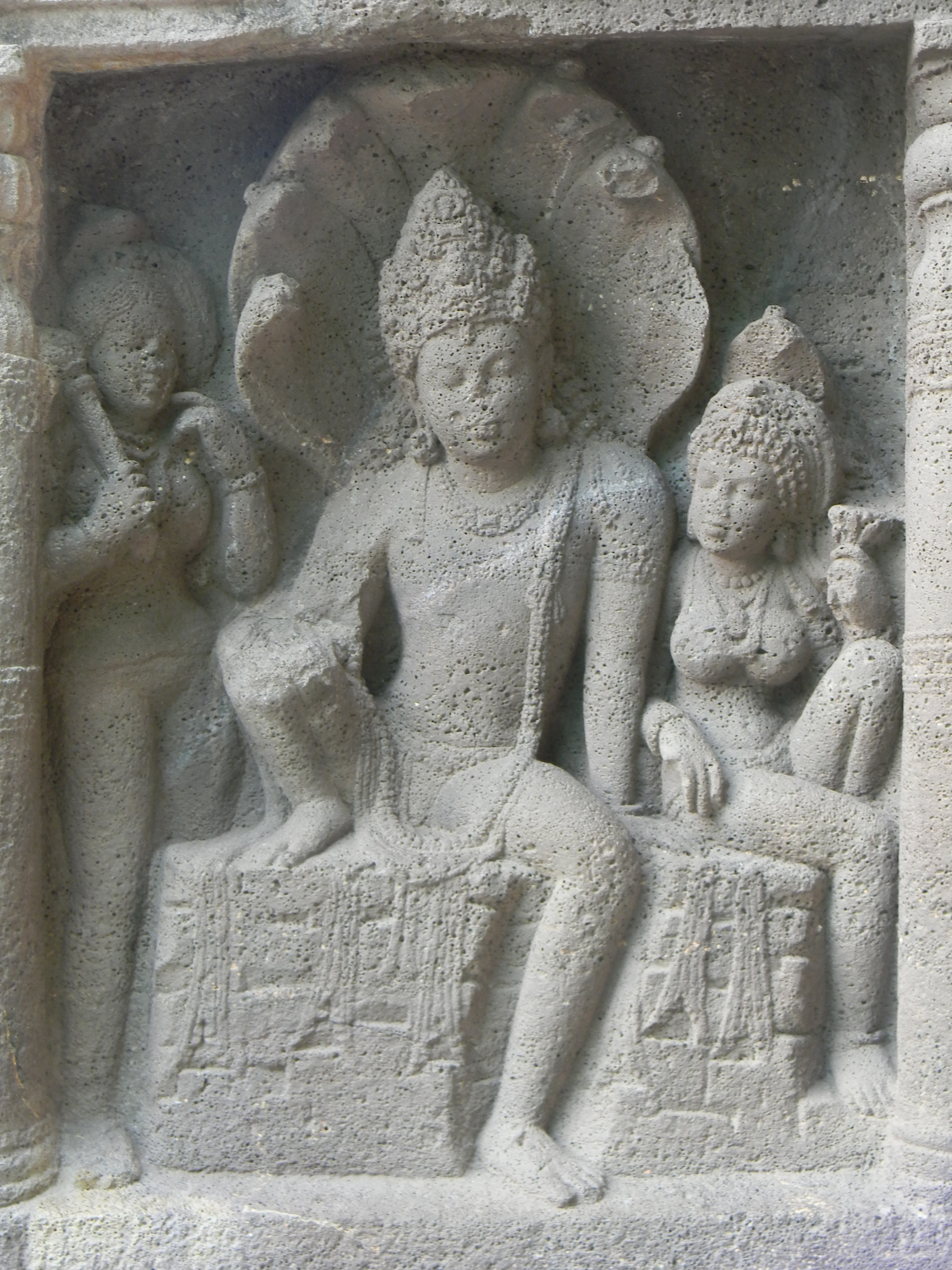
Nagaraja in ardhaparyanka asana, with his wife holding lotus and wearing mangalasutra

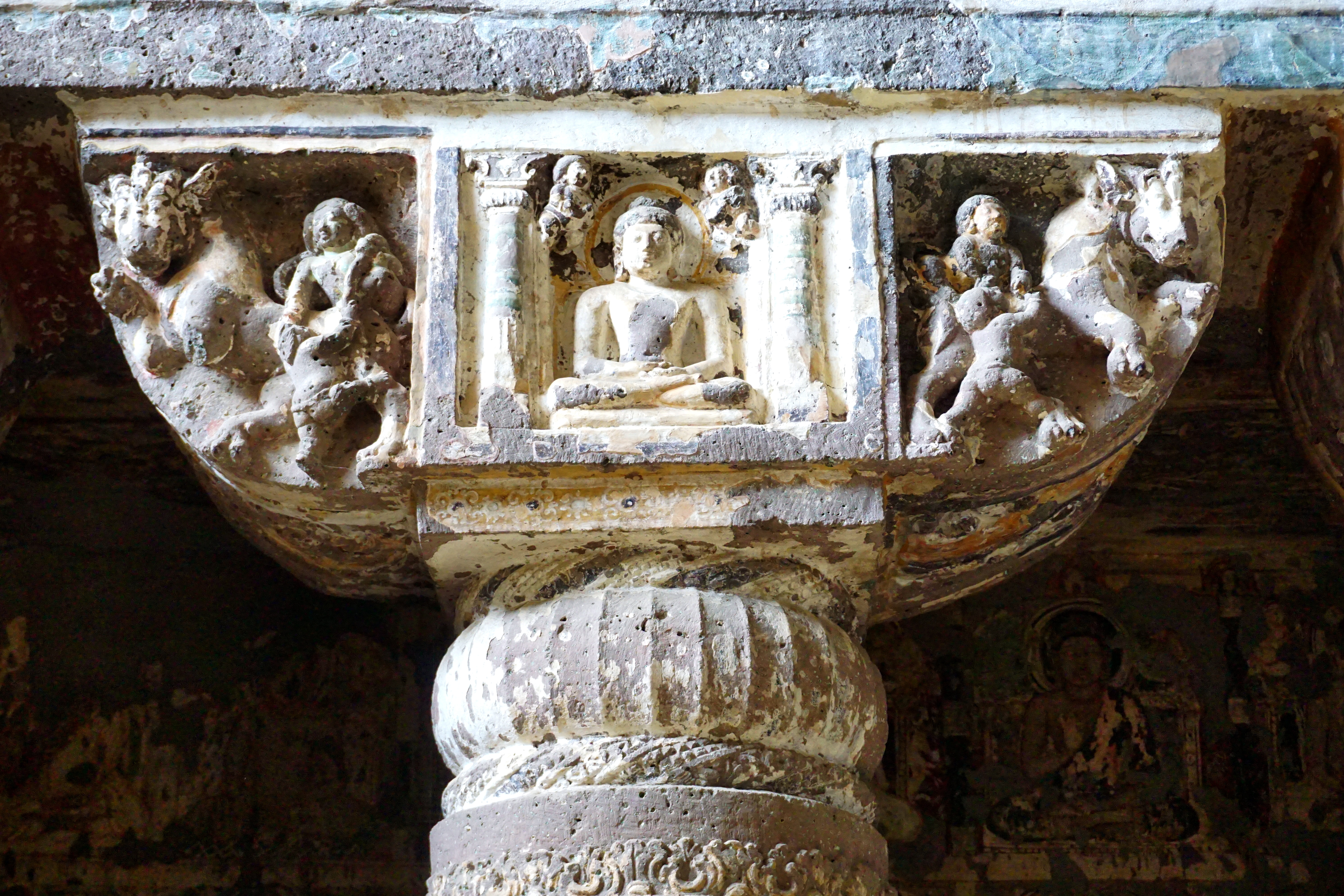
The nave has 15 pillars with Buddha reliefs

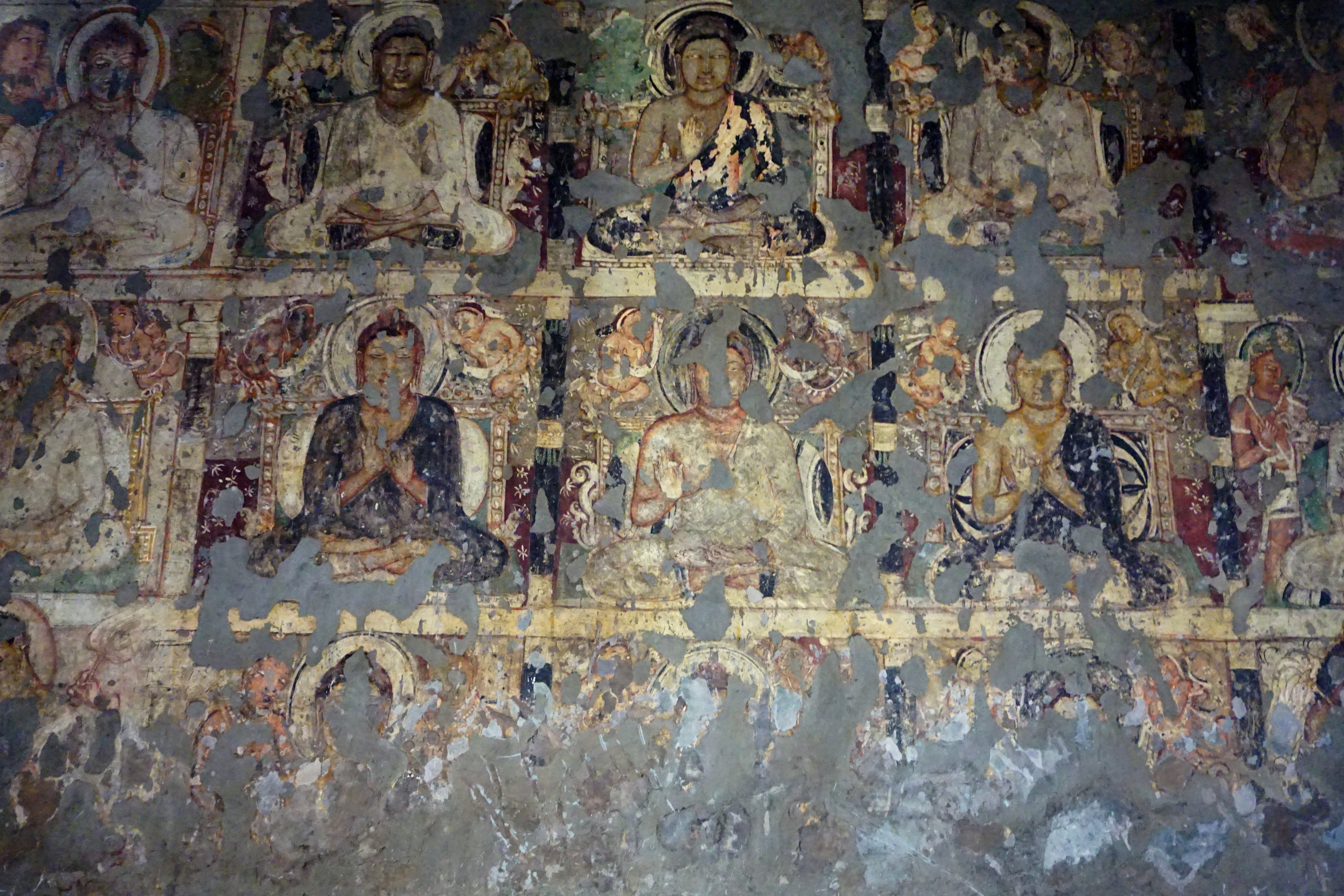
Buddha paintings in the side aisle of Cave 19

== Cave 20 ==
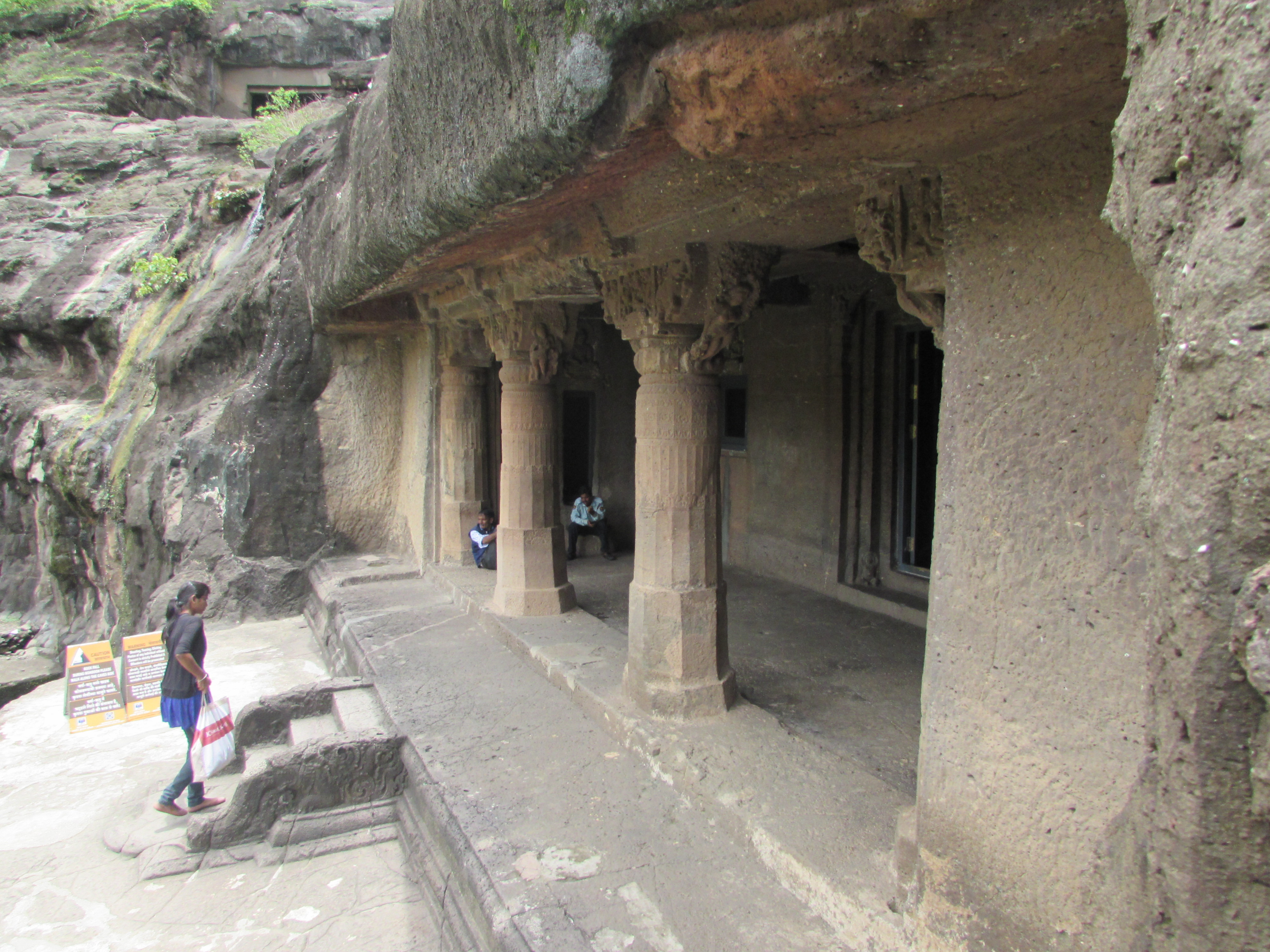
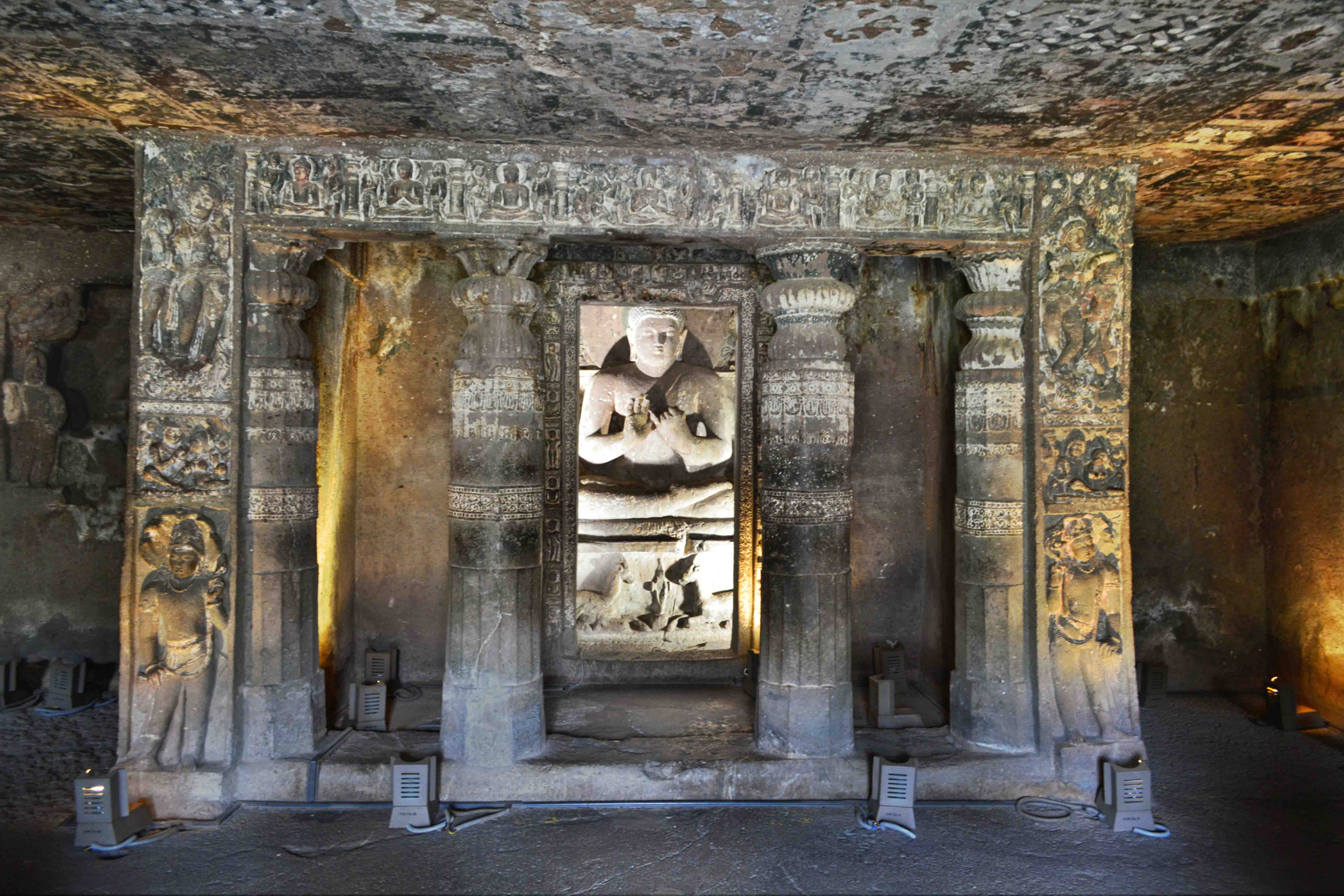
Cave 20: exterior, and main shrine with pillars

Cave 20 is a monastery hall (16.2 × 17.91 m) from the 5th century. Its construction, states Spink, was started in the 460s by king Upendragupta, with his expressed desire "to make the great tree of religious merit grow". The work on Cave 20 was pursued in parallel with other caves. Cave 20 has exquisite detailing, states Spink, but it was relatively lower on priority than Caves 17 and 19. The work on Cave 20 was intermittently stopped and then continued in the following decade.

The vihara consists of a sanctum, four cells for monks and a pillared verandah with two stone cut windows for light. Prior to entering the main hall, on the left of veranda are two Buddhas carved above the window and side cell. The ceiling of the main hall has remnants of painting. The sanctum Buddha is in preaching posture. The cave is known for the sculpture showing seven Buddhas with attendants on its lintel. The cave has a dedicatory Sanskrit inscription in Brahmi script in its verandah, and it calls the cave as a mandapa.

Many of the figural and ornamental carvings in Cave 20 are similar to Cave 19, and to a lesser degree to those found in Cave 17. This may be because the same architects and artisans were responsible for the evolution of the three caves. The door frames in Cave 20 are quasi-structural, something unique at the Ajanta site. The decorations are also innovative in Cave 20, such as one showing the Buddha seated against two pillows and "a richly laden mango tree behind him", states Spink.

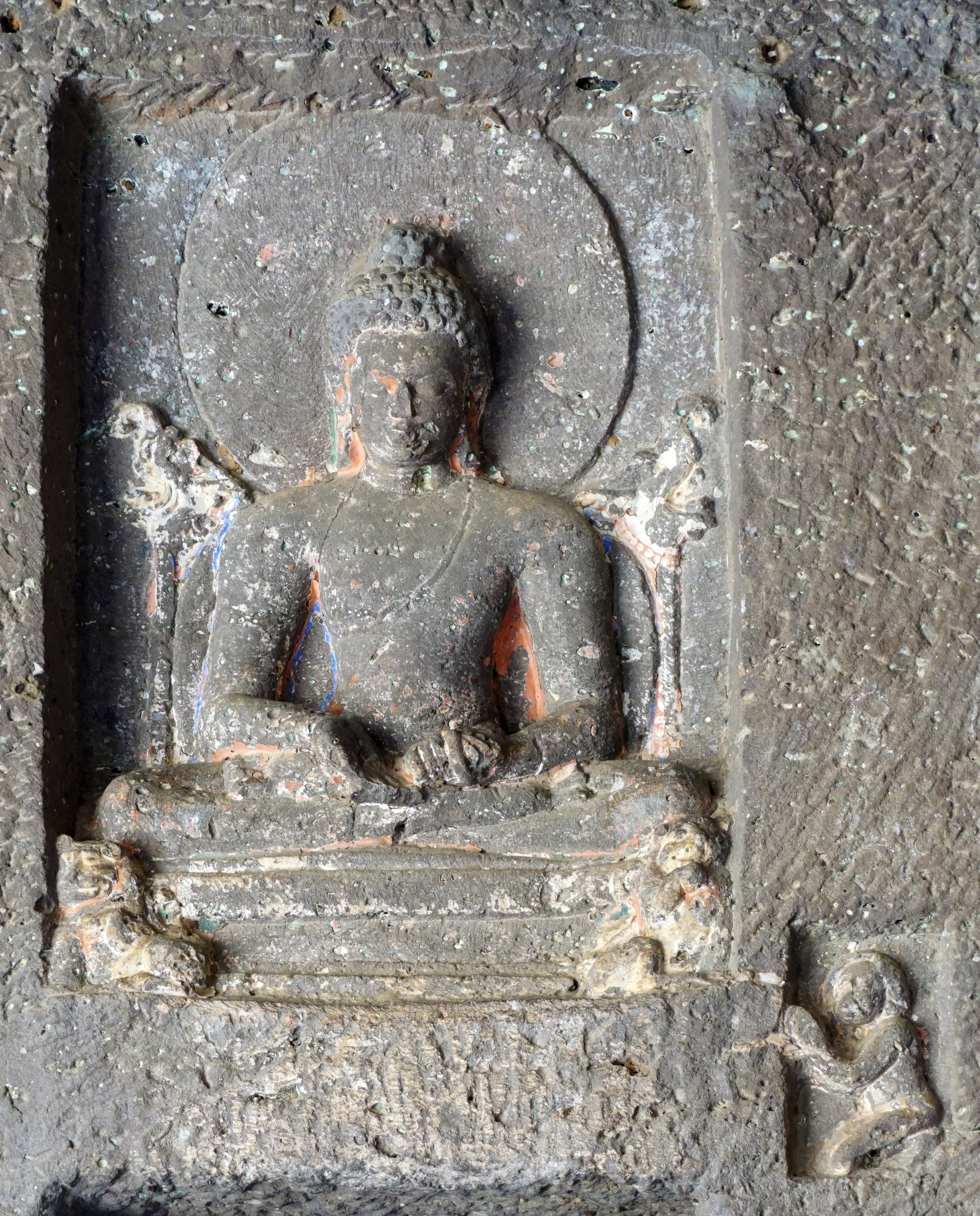
The Buddha on Lion throne

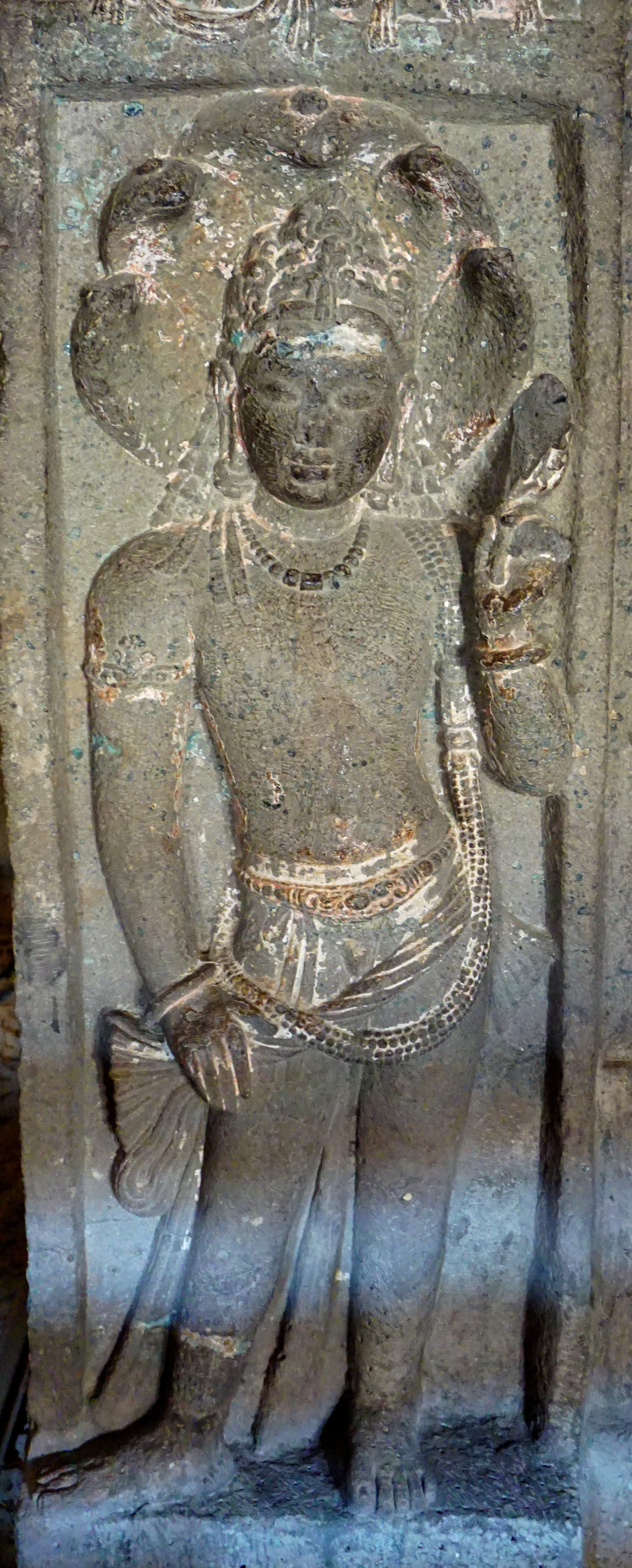
The sanctum has two Nagarajas on the side as guardians.

== Cave 21 ==
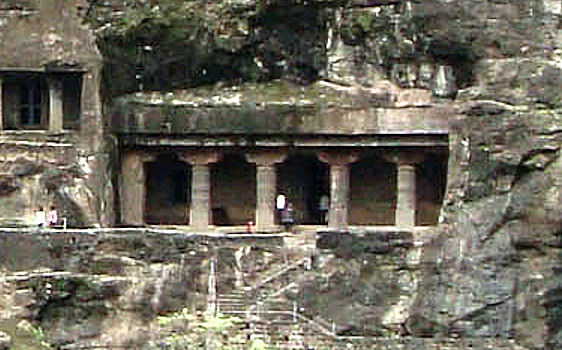
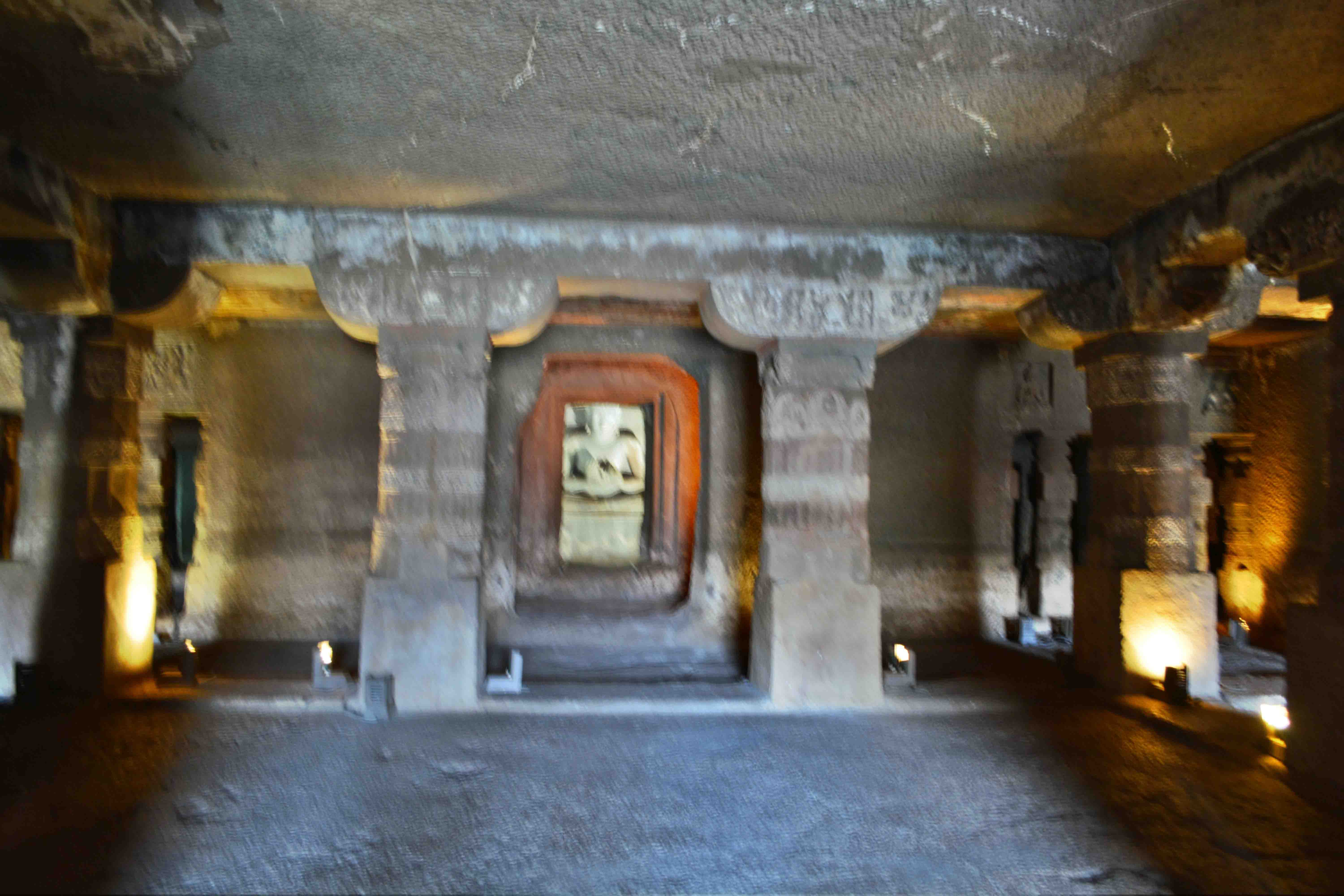
Cave 21: exterior, and inside hall

Cave 21 is a hall (29.56 × 28.03 m) with twelve rock-cut rooms for monks, a sanctum, and twelve pillared and pilastered verandah. The carvings on the pilaster include those of animals and flowers. The pillars feature reliefs of apsaras, Nagaraja, and Nagarani, as well as devotees bowing with the Anjali mudra. The hall shows evidence that it used to be completely painted. The sanctum Buddha is shown in preaching posture.

== Cave 22 ==
Cave 22 is a small vihara (12.72 × 11.58 m) with a narrow veranda and four unfinished cells. It is excavated at a higher level and has to be reached by a flight of steps. Inside, the Buddha is seated in pralamba-padasana. The painted figures in Cave 22 show Manushi-Buddhas with Maitreya. A pilaster on the left side of the Cave 22 veranda has a Sanskrit prose inscription. It is damaged in parts, and the legible parts state that this is a "meritorious gift of a mandapa by Jayata", calling Jayata's family as "a great Upasaka", and ending the inscription with "may the merit of this be for excellent knowledge to all sentient beings, beginning with father and mother".

== Cave 23 ==
Cave 23 is also unfinished, consisting of a hall (28.32 × 22.52 m) but a design similar to Cave 21. The cave differs in its pillar decorations and the naga doorkeepers.

== Cave 24 ==
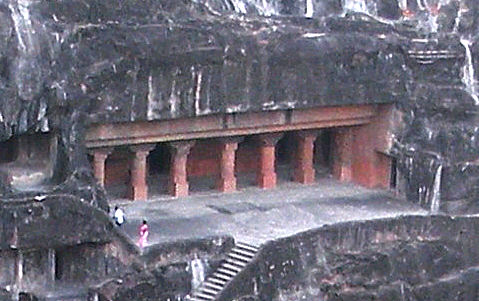
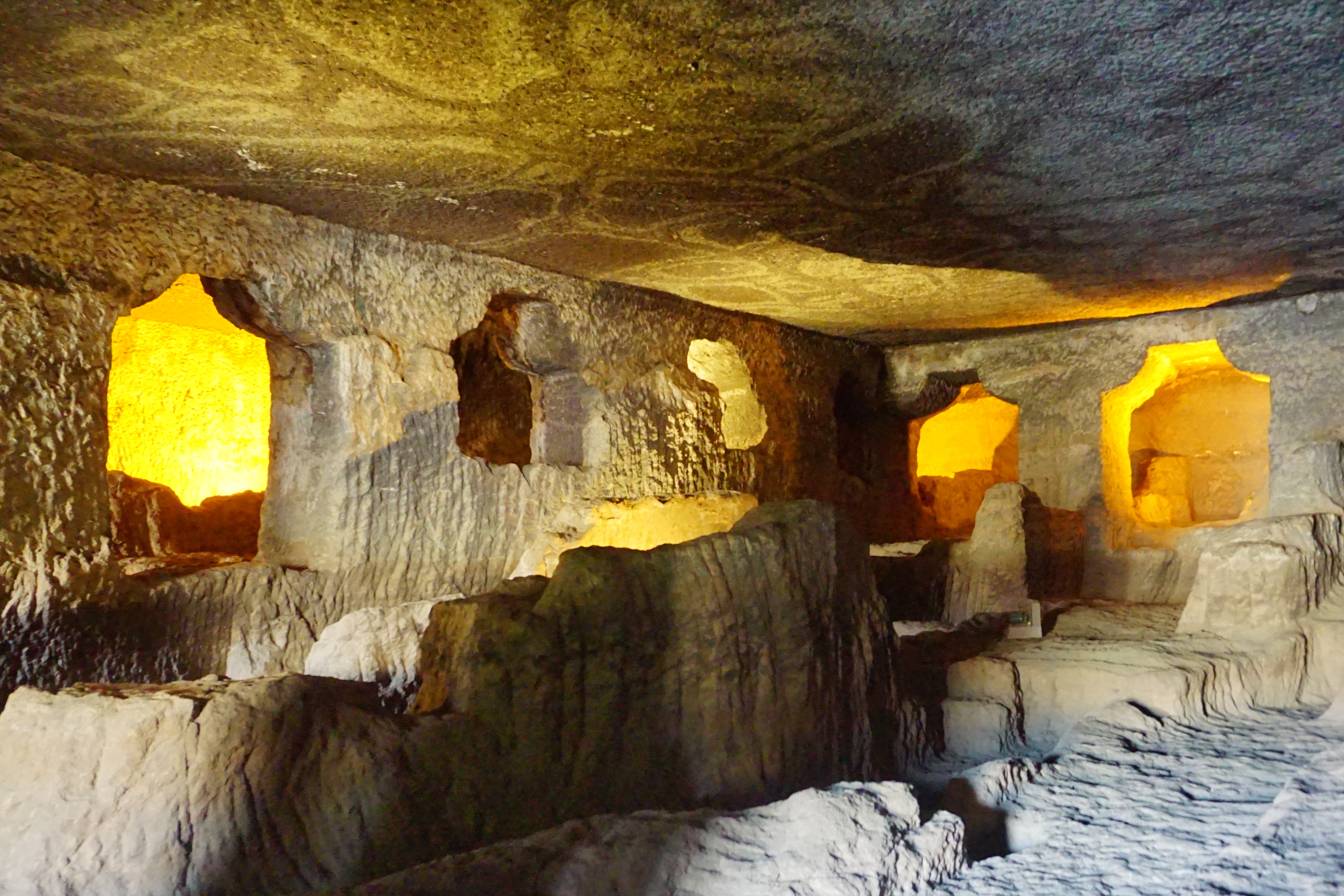
Exterior, and unfinished inside of Cave 24.

Cave 24 is like Cave 21, unfinished but much larger. It features the second largest monastery hall (29.3 × 29.3 m) after Cave 4. The cave 24 monastery has been important to scholarly studies of the site because it shows how multiple crews of workers completed their objectives in parallel. The cell construction began as soon as the aisle had been excavated and while the main hall and sanctum were under construction. The construction of Cave 24 was planned in 467 CE, but likely started in 475 CE, with support from Buddhabhadra, then abruptly ended in 477 with the sponsor king Harisena's death. It is significant in having one of the most complex capitals on a pillar at the Ajanta site, an indication of how the artists excelled and continuously improved their sophistication as they worked with the rock inside the cave. The artists carved fourteen complex miniature figures on the central panel of the right center porch pillar, while working in dim light in a cramped cave space. The medallion reliefs in Cave 24 similarly show loving couples and anthropomorphic arts, rather than flowers of earlier construction. Cave 24's sanctum has a seated Buddha in pralamba-padasana.

== Cave 25 ==
Cave 25 is a monastery. Its hall (11.37 × 12.24 m) is similar to other monasteries, but has no sanctum, includes an enclosed courtyard and is excavated at an upper level.

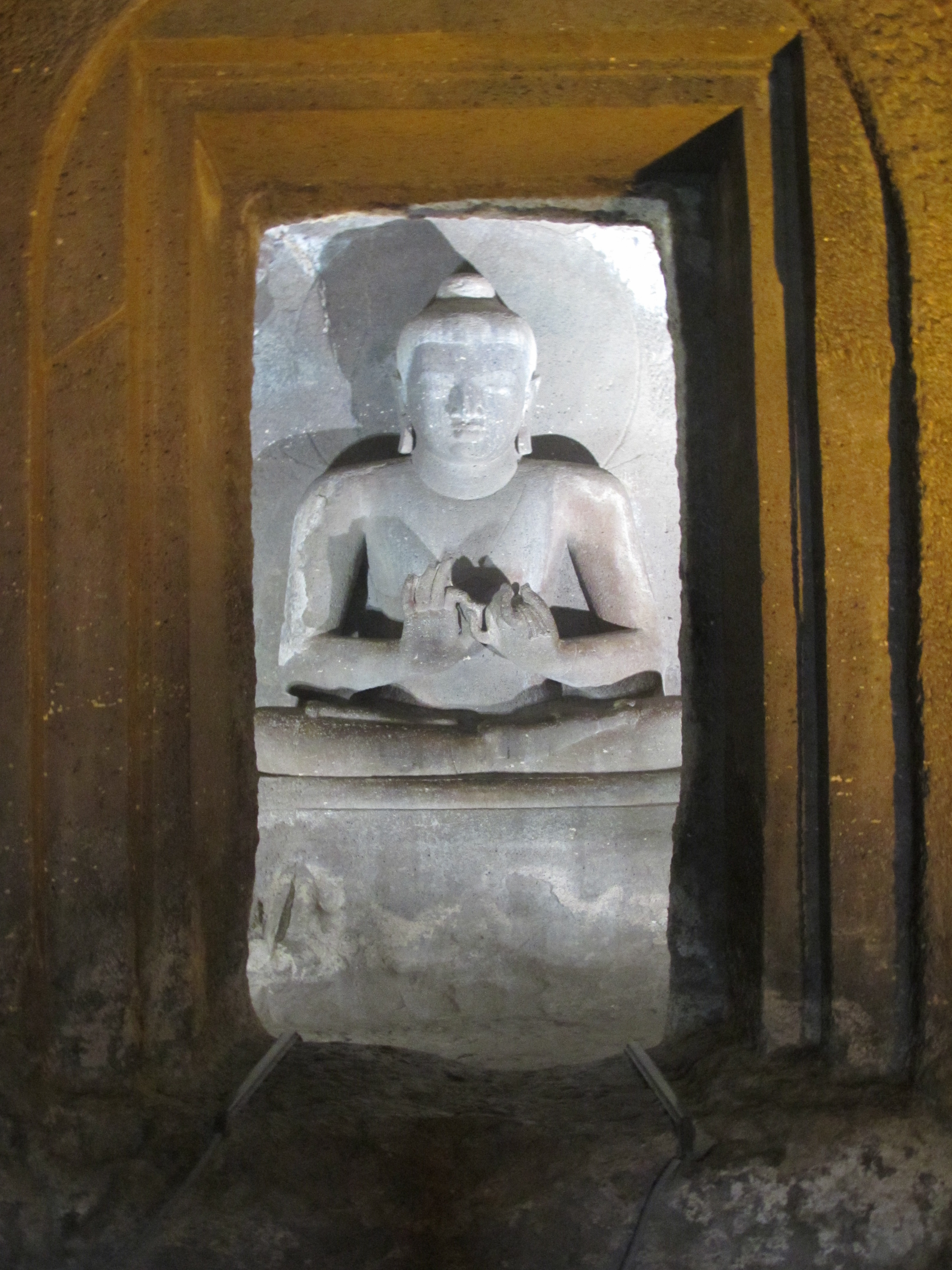
The Buddha of Cave 21

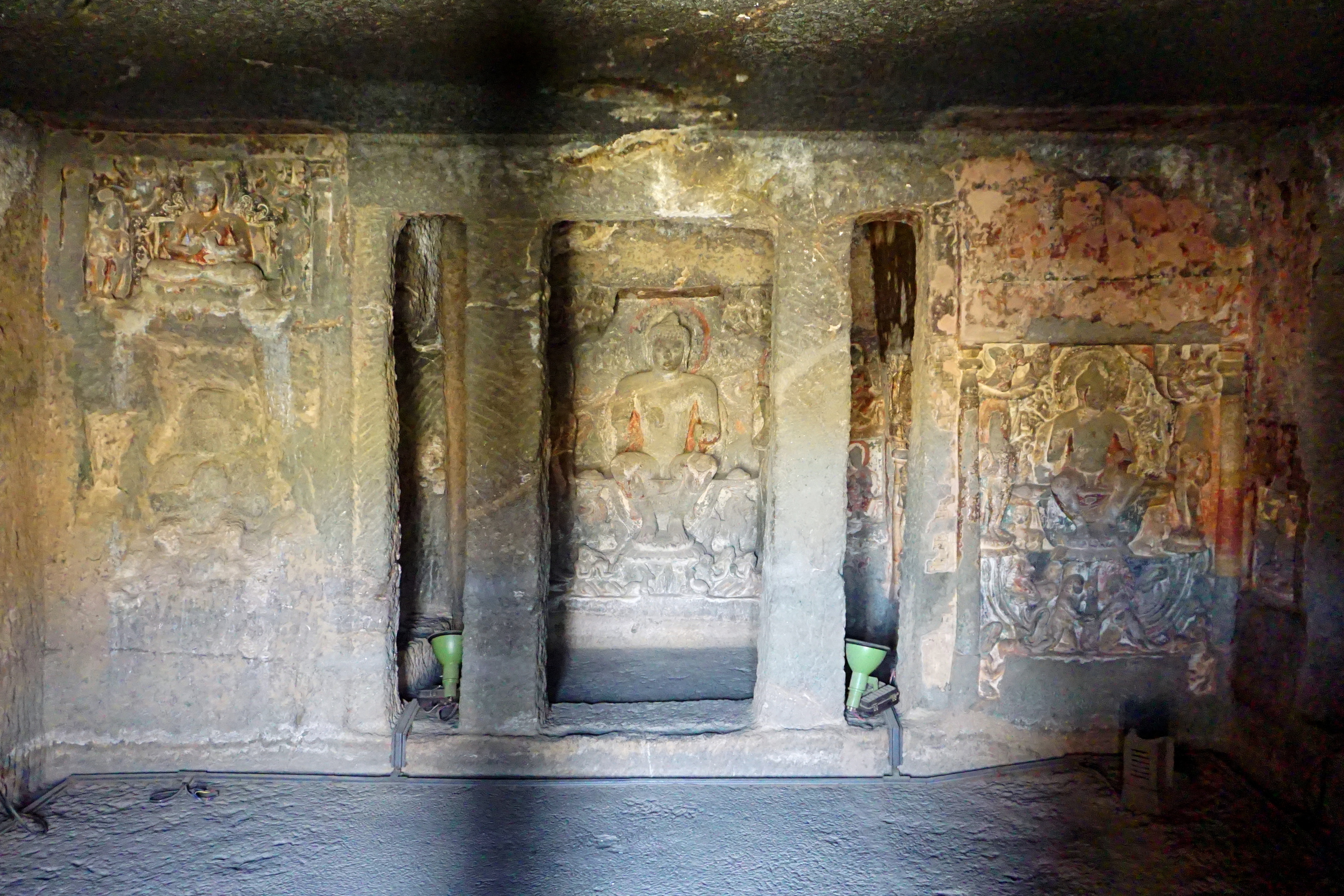
Cave 22: inside hall

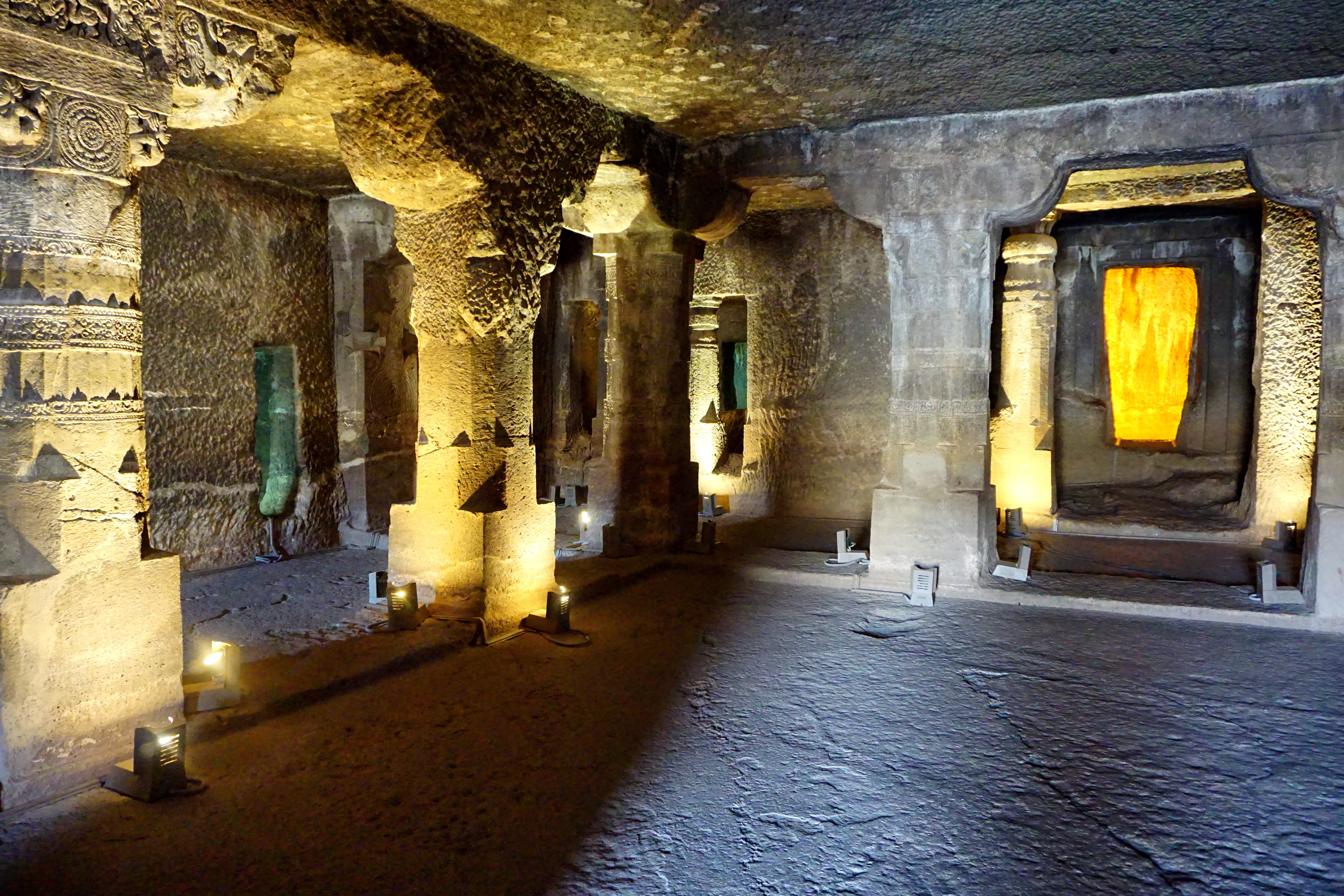
Cave 23: inside hall

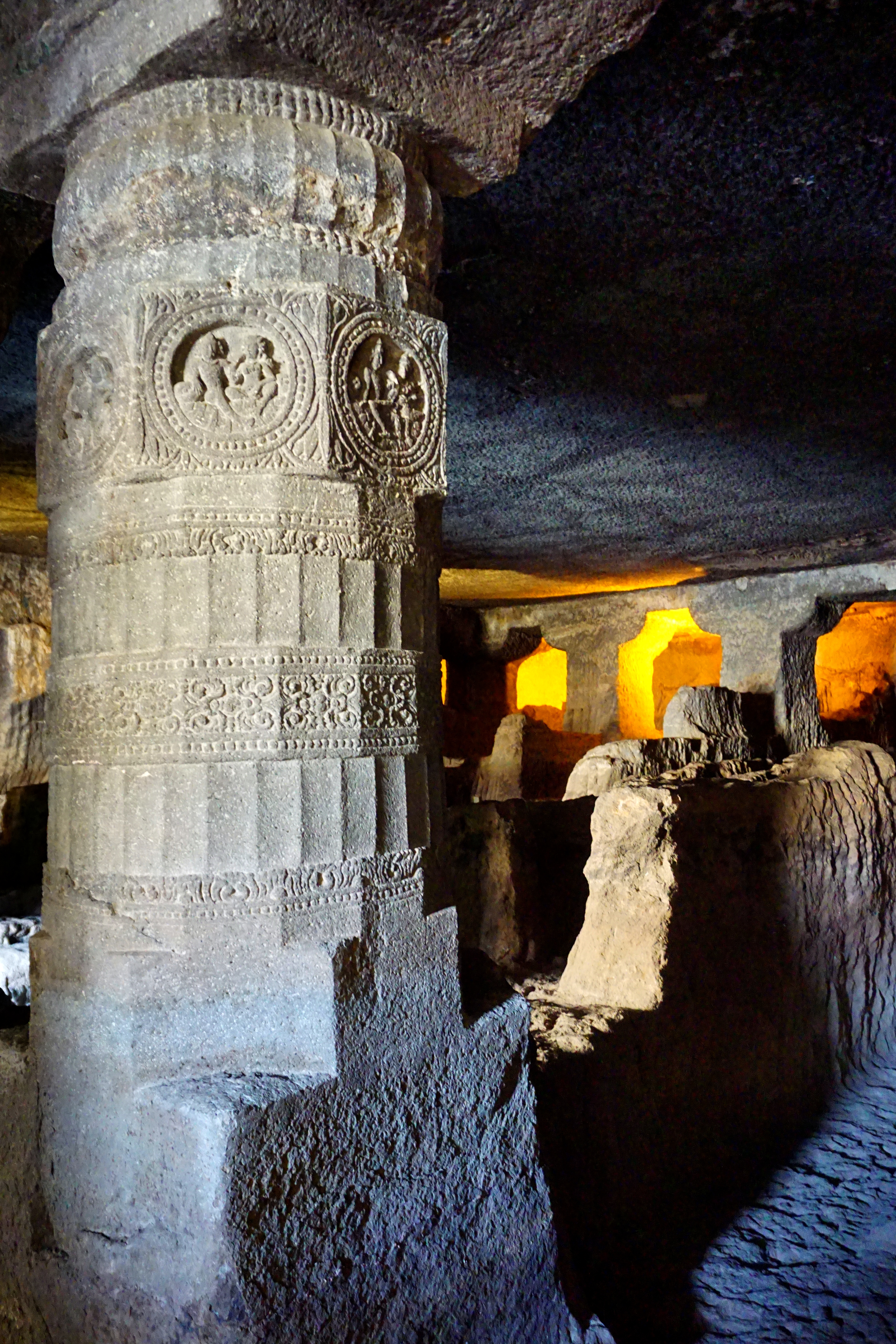
Sophisticated pillars of Cave 24 with embedded loving couples; evidence of parallel work

== Cave 26 (5th century CE) ==
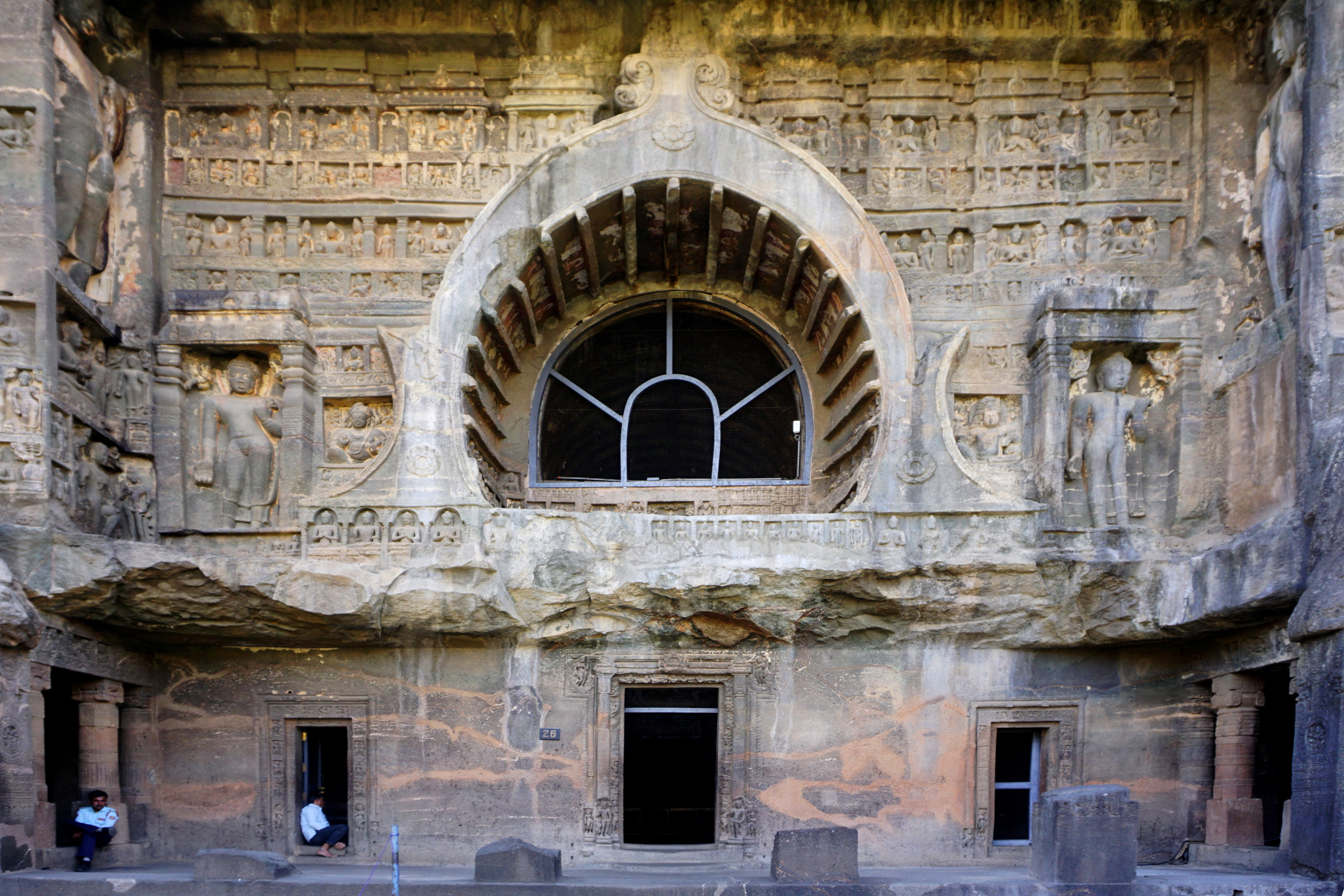
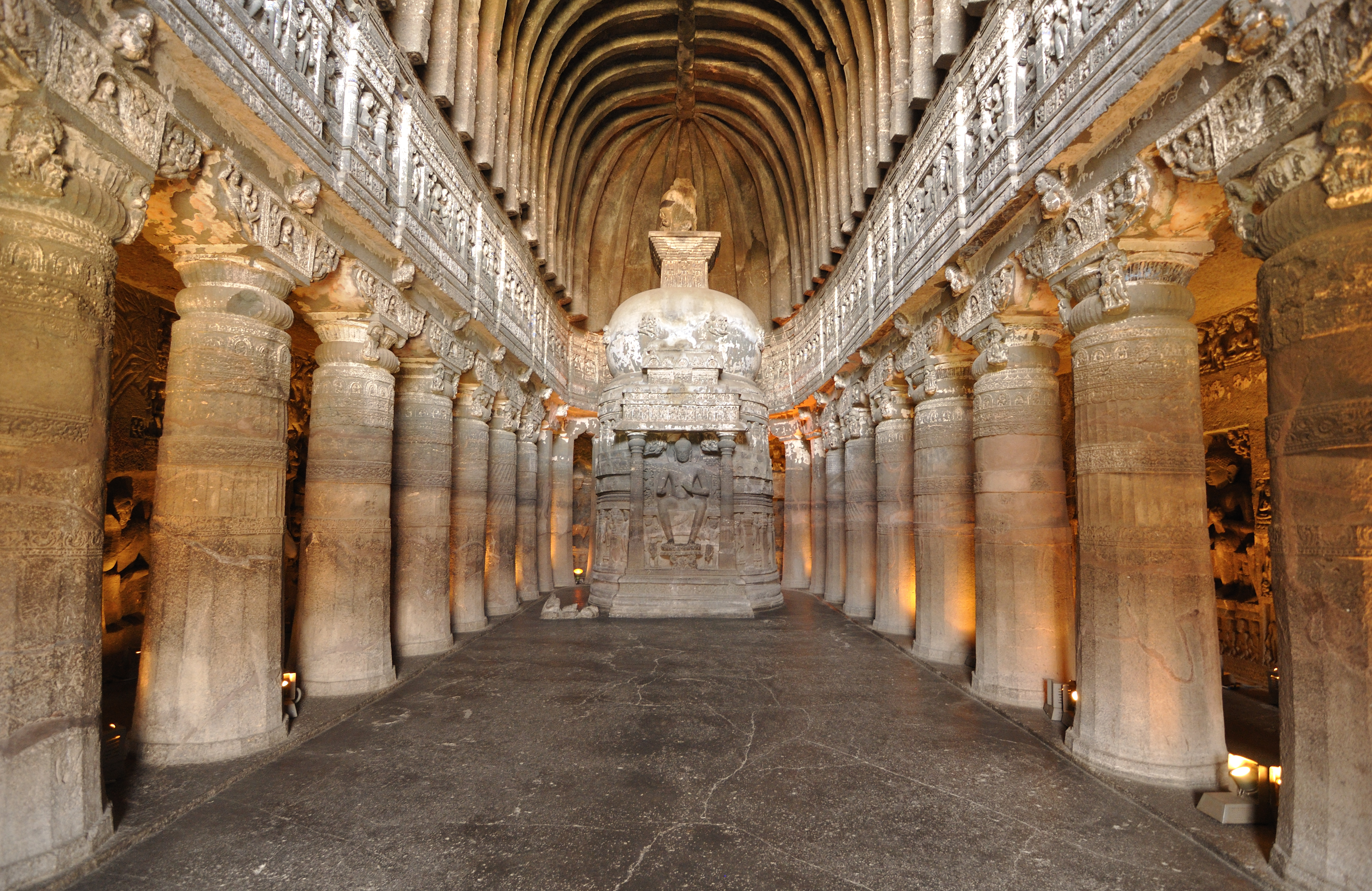
Cave 26: entrance and interior of hall

Cave 26 is a worship hall (chaityagriha, 25.34 × 11.52 m) similar in plan to Cave 19. It is much larger and with elements of a vihara design. An inscription states that a monk Buddhabhadra and his friend minister serving king of Asmaka gifted this vast cave. The inscription includes a vision statement and the aim to make "a memorial on the mountain that will endure for as long as the moon and the sun continue", translates Walter Spink. It is likely that the builders focussed on sculpture, rather than paintings, in Cave 26 because they believed stone sculpture will far more endure than paintings on the wall.

The sculptures in Cave 26 are elaborate and more intricate. It is among the last caves excavated, and an inscription suggests late 5th or early 6th century according to ASI. The cave consists of an apsidal hall with side aisles for circumambulation (pradikshana). This path is full of carved Buddhist legends, three depictions of the Miracle of Sravasti in the right ambulatory side of the aisle, and seated Buddhas in various mudra. Many of these were added later by devotees, and therefore are intrusive to the aims of the original planners. The artwork begins on the wall of the aisle, immediately the left side of entrance. The major artworks include the Mahaparinirvana of Buddha (reclining Buddha) on the wall, followed by the legend called the "Temptations by Mara". The temptations include the seduction by Mara's daughters who are depicted below the meditating Buddha. They are shown scantly dressed and in seductive postures, while on both the left and right side of the Buddha are armies of Mara attempting to distract him with noise and threaten him with violence. In the top right corner is the image of a dejected Mara frustrated by his failure to disturb the resolve or focus of the ascetic Buddha.

At the center of the apse is a rock-cut stupa. The stupa has an image of the Buddha on its front, 18 panels on its base, 18 panels above these, a three tiered torana above him, and apsaras are carved on the anda (hemispherical egg) stupa. On top of the dagoba is a nine-tiered harmika, a symbolism for the nine saṃsāra (Buddhism) heavens in Mahayana cosmology. The walls, pillars, brackets and the triforium are extensively carved with Buddhist themes. Many of the wall reliefs and images in this cave were badly damaged, and have been restored as a part of the site conservation efforts.

Between cave 26 and its left wing, there is an inscription by a courtier of Rashtrakuta Nanaraj (who is mentioned in the Multai and Sangaloda plates), from late 7th or early 8th century. It is the last inscription in Ajanta.

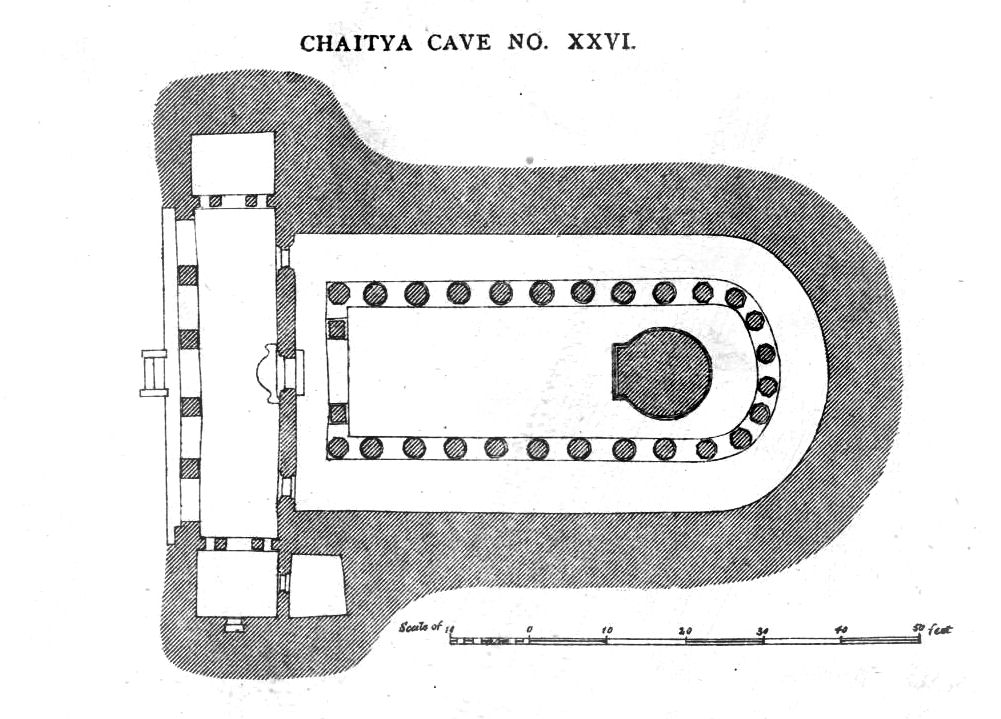
Cave 26 plan as completed. The etchings suggest the original plan was more ambitious.

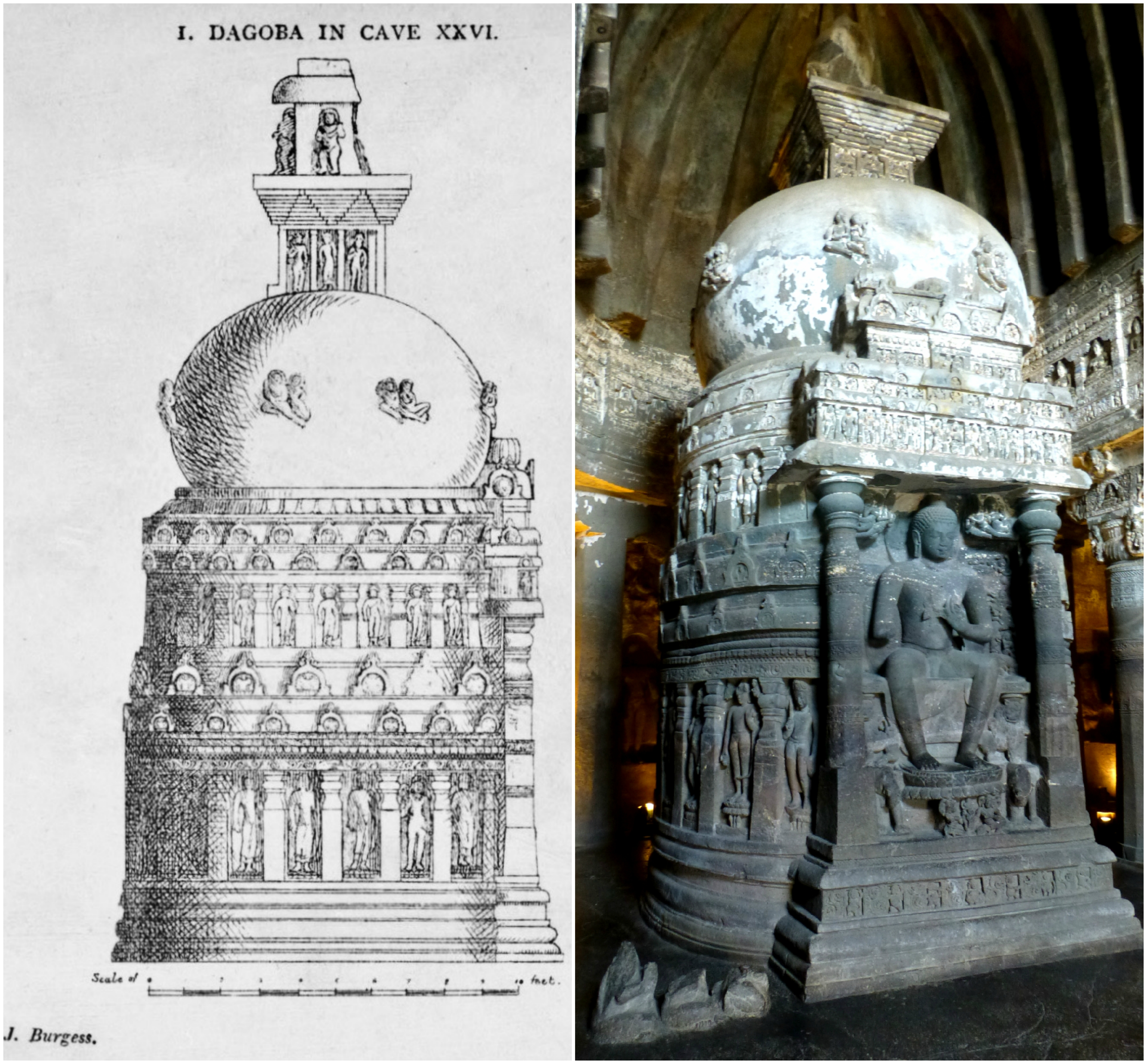
The sculptured dagoba (stupa) in the worship hall. It has 36 carved panels.

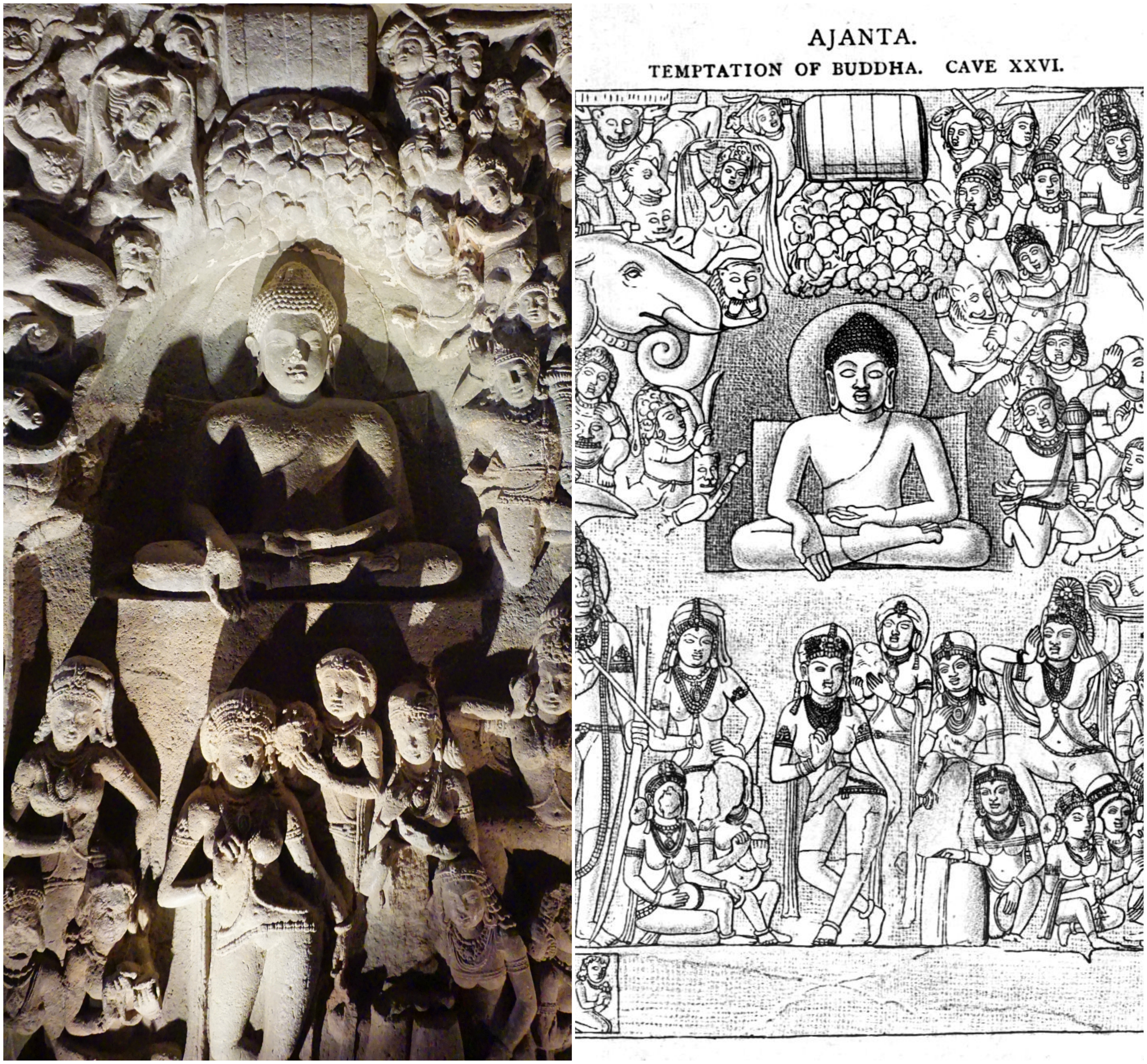
Temptation of the Buddha; the daughters of Mara carved below are trying to seduce him. Mara is on the top right.

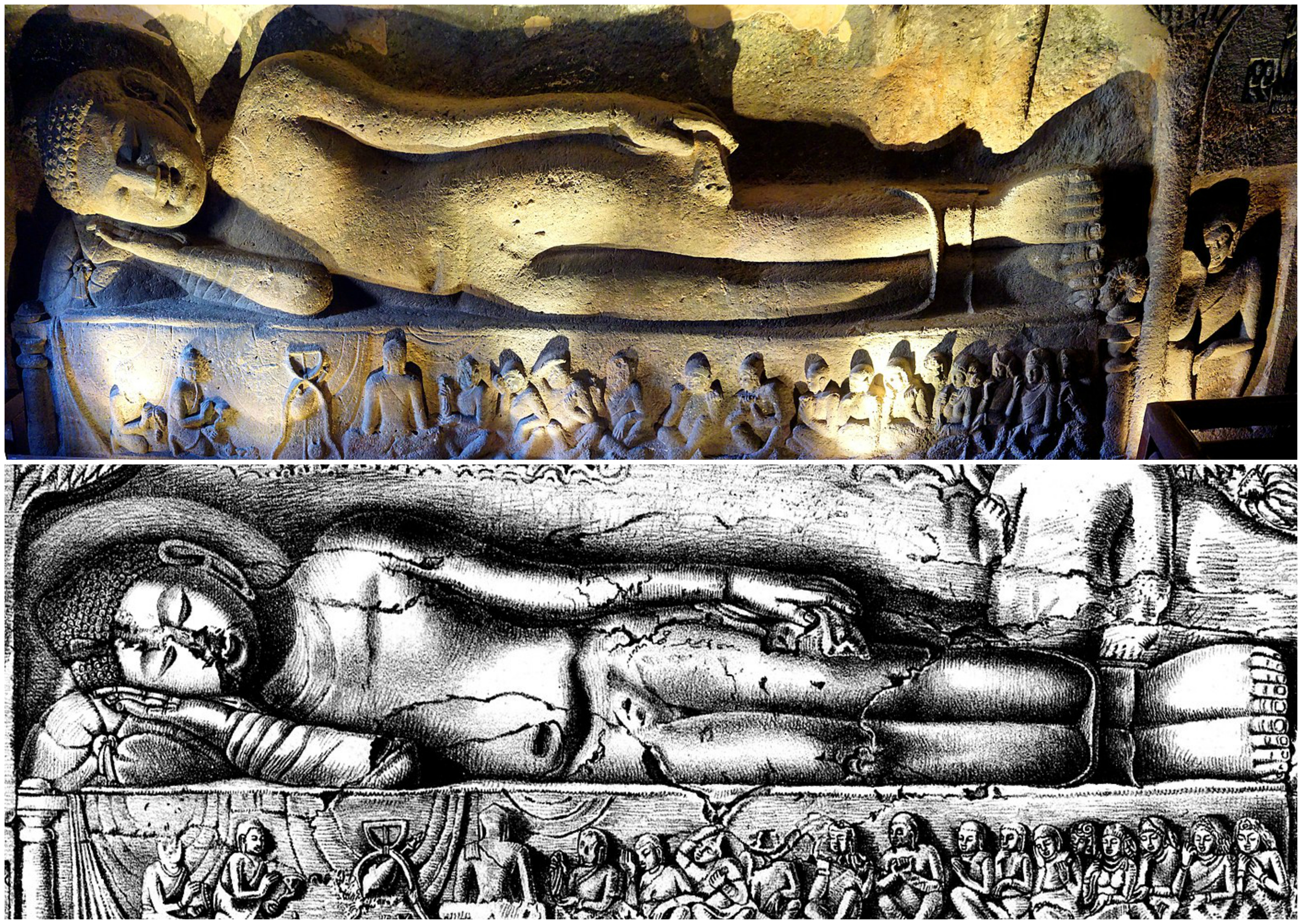
Cave 26, left aisle wall: Mahaparinirvana of Buddha, or Dying Buddha

== Cave 27 ==
Cave 27 is a monastery and may have been planned as an attachment to Cave 26. Its two storeys are damaged, with the upper level partially collapsed. Its plan is similar to other monasteries.

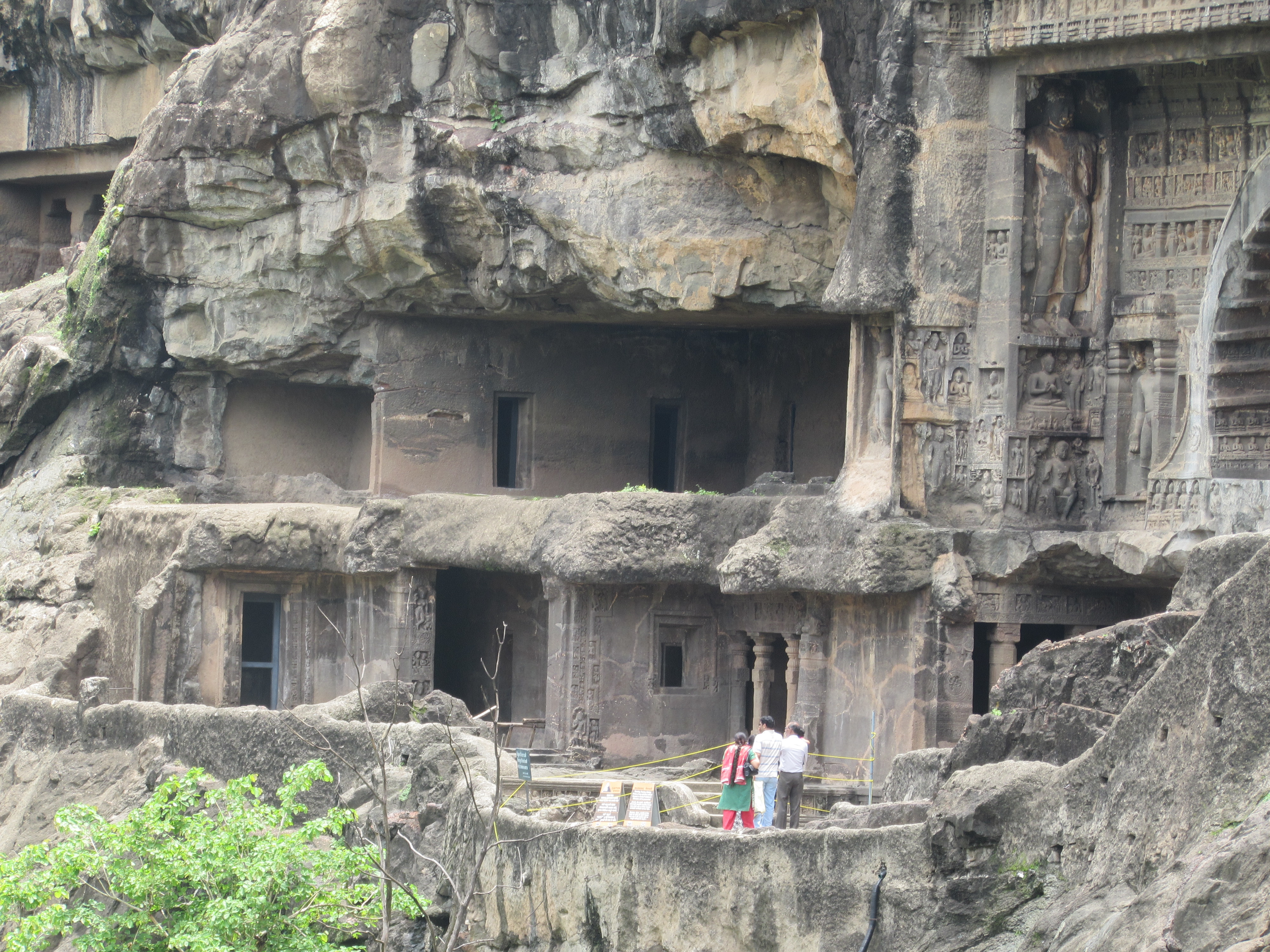
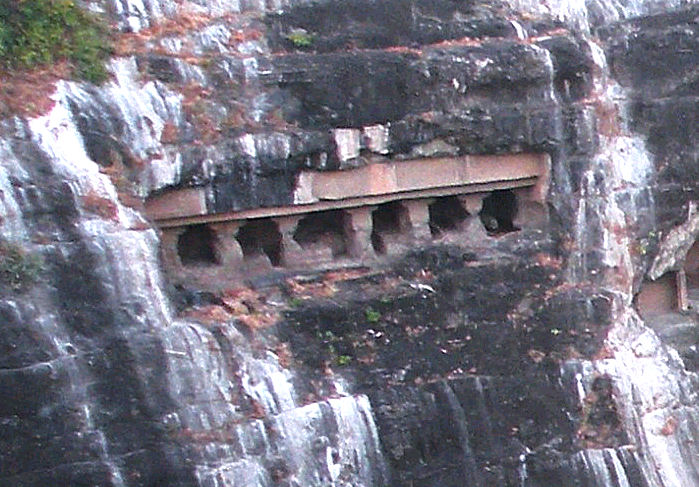
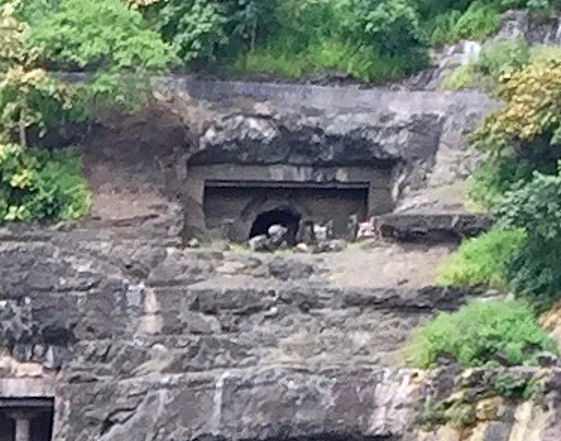
Left: Cave 27, to the left of Cave 26. Middle: Cave 28, further beyond Cave 27, at the westernmost end of the Ajanta complex. Right: Cave 29, high up between caves 20 and 21.

== Cave 28 ==
Cave 28 is an unfinished monastery, partially excavated, at the westernmost end of the Ajanta complex and barely accessible.

== Cave 29 ==
Cave 29 an unfinished monastery at the highest level of the Ajanta complex, apparently unnoticed when the initial numbering system was established, and physically located between Caves 20 and 21.

== Cave 30 ==
In 1956, a landslide covered the footpath leading to Cave 16. In the attempts to clear and restore the walkway, a small aperture and votive stupa were noticed in the debris by the workers, in a location near the stream bed. Further tracing and excavations led to a previously unknown Hinayana monastery cave dated to the 2nd and 1st century BCE. Cave 30 may actually be the oldest cave of the Ajanta complex. It is a 3.66 m × 3.66 m cave with three cells, each with two stone beds and stone pillows on the side of each cell. The cell door lintels show lotus and garland carvings. The cave has two inscriptions in an unknown script. It also has a platform on its veranda with a fine view of the river ravine below and the forest cover. According to Gupte and Mahajan, this cave may have been closed at some point with large carefully carved pieces as it distracted the entrance view of Cave 16.

== Other infrastructure ==
Over 80% of the Ajanta caves were vihara (temporary traveler residences, monasteries). The designers and artisans who built these caves included facilities for collecting donations and storing grains and food for the visitors and monks. Many of the caves include large repositories cut into the floor. The largest storage spaces are found, states Spink, in the "very commodious recesses in the shrines of both Ajanta Cave Lower 6 and Cave 11". These caves were probably chosen because of their relative convenience and the security they offered due to their higher level. The choice of integrating covered vaults cut into the floor may have been driven by the need to provide sleeping space. (Note: Granaries and kitchens were commonly integrated as infrastructures near major temples and monasteries in India. They are also found embedded into the design elsewhere such as the Bagh monuments.)

== Recent excavations ==
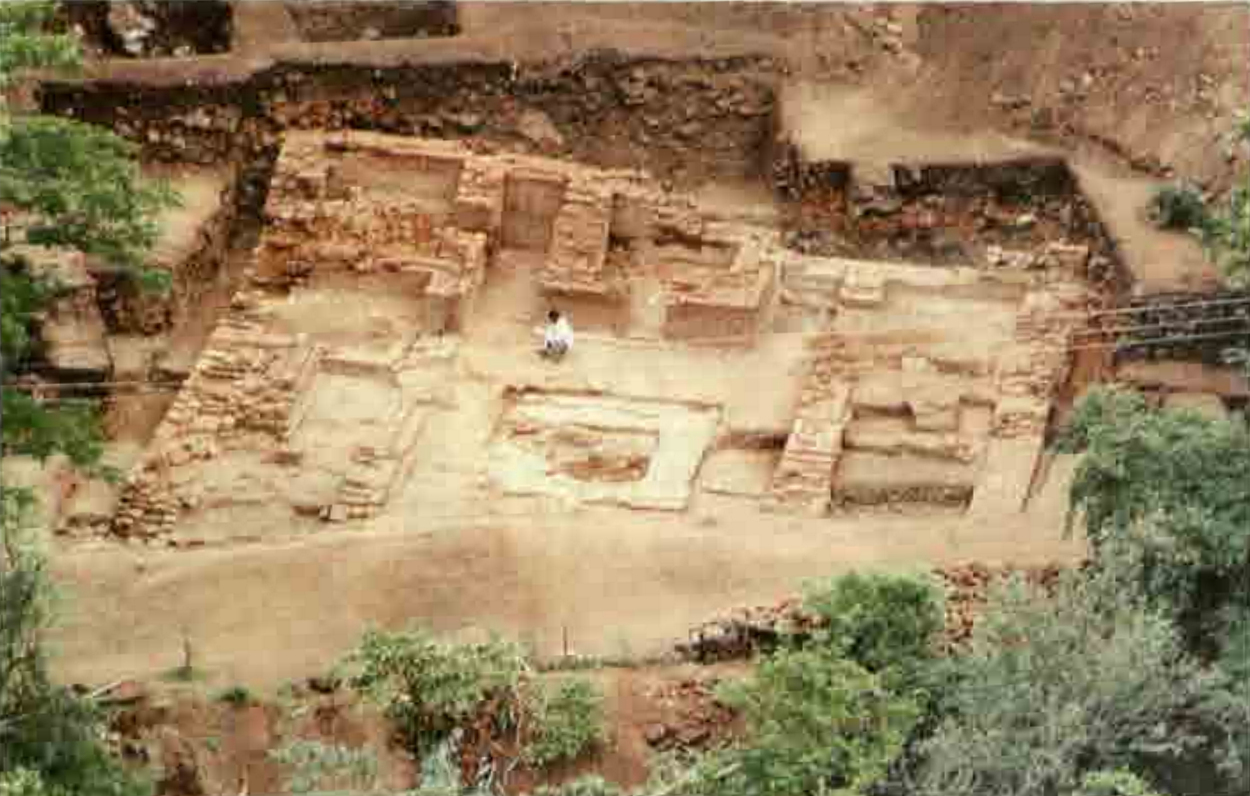
The vihara brick monastery facing the caves at Ajanta. The cells were built around a stupa set on a central platform.

A burnt-brick vihara monastery facing the caves on the right bank of the river Waghora has been recently excavated. It has a number of cells facing a central courtyard, in which a stupa was established. A coin of the Western Satraps ruler Visvasena (ruled 293–304 CE) as well as a gold coin of the Byzantine Emperor Theodosius II (ruled 402-450 CE) were found in the excavations, giving further numismatic confirmation for the dating of the caves. A terracotta plaque of Mahishasuramardini was also found, which was possibly under worship by the artisans.

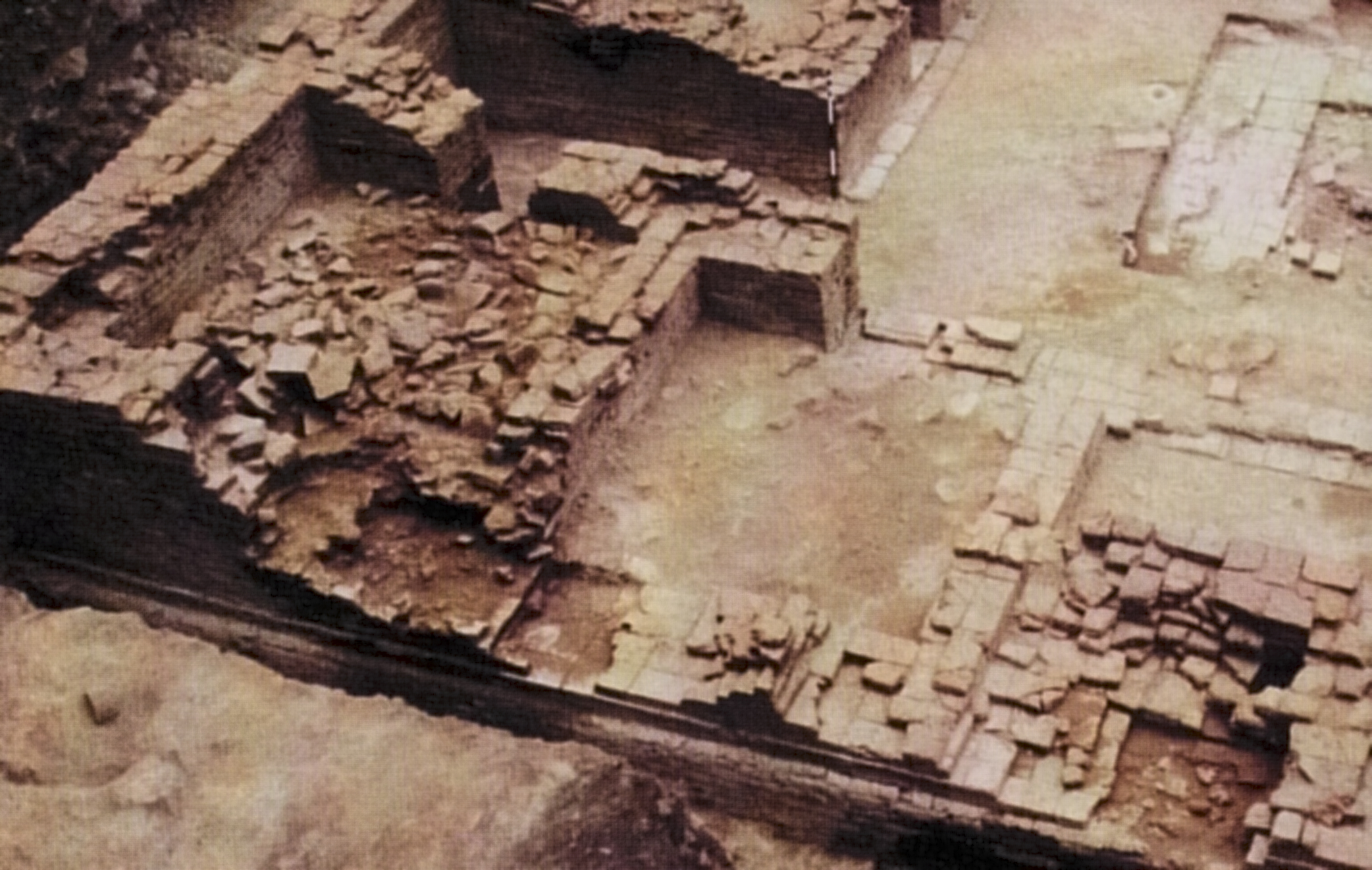
Buddhist vihara cell structure at the recently excavated brick monastery at Ajanta

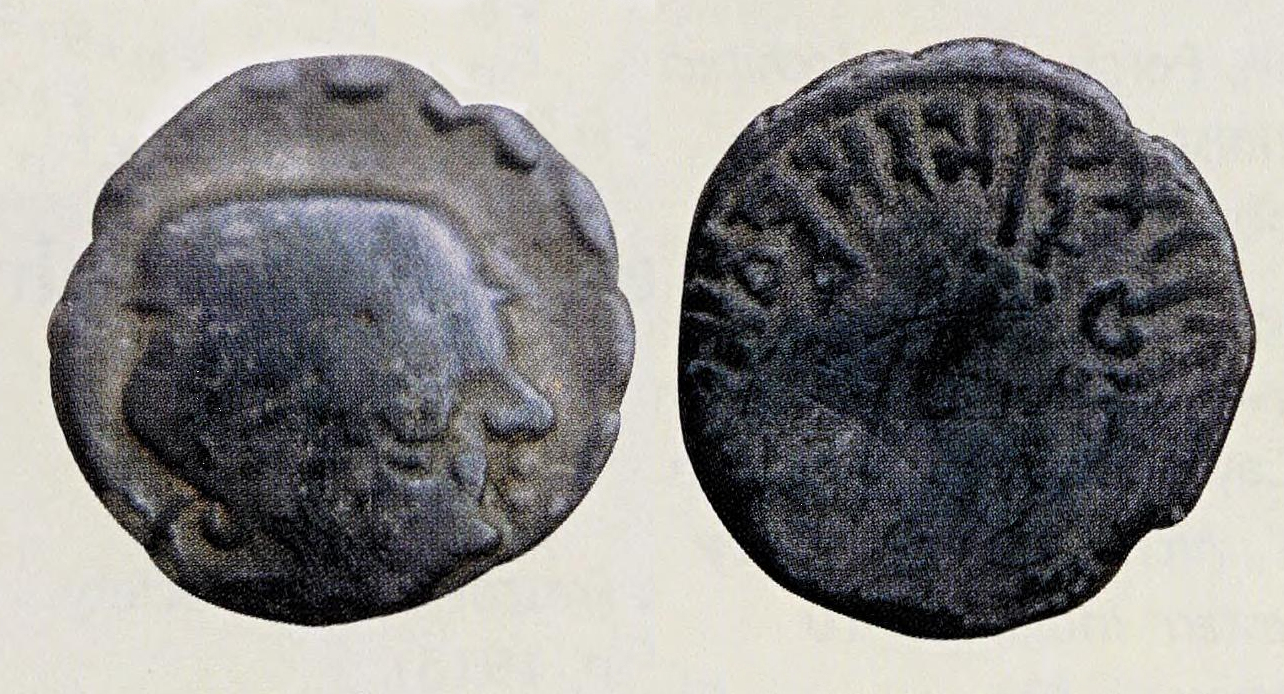
Coin of Western Satrap Visvasena (293–304), found in the excavations at the monastery

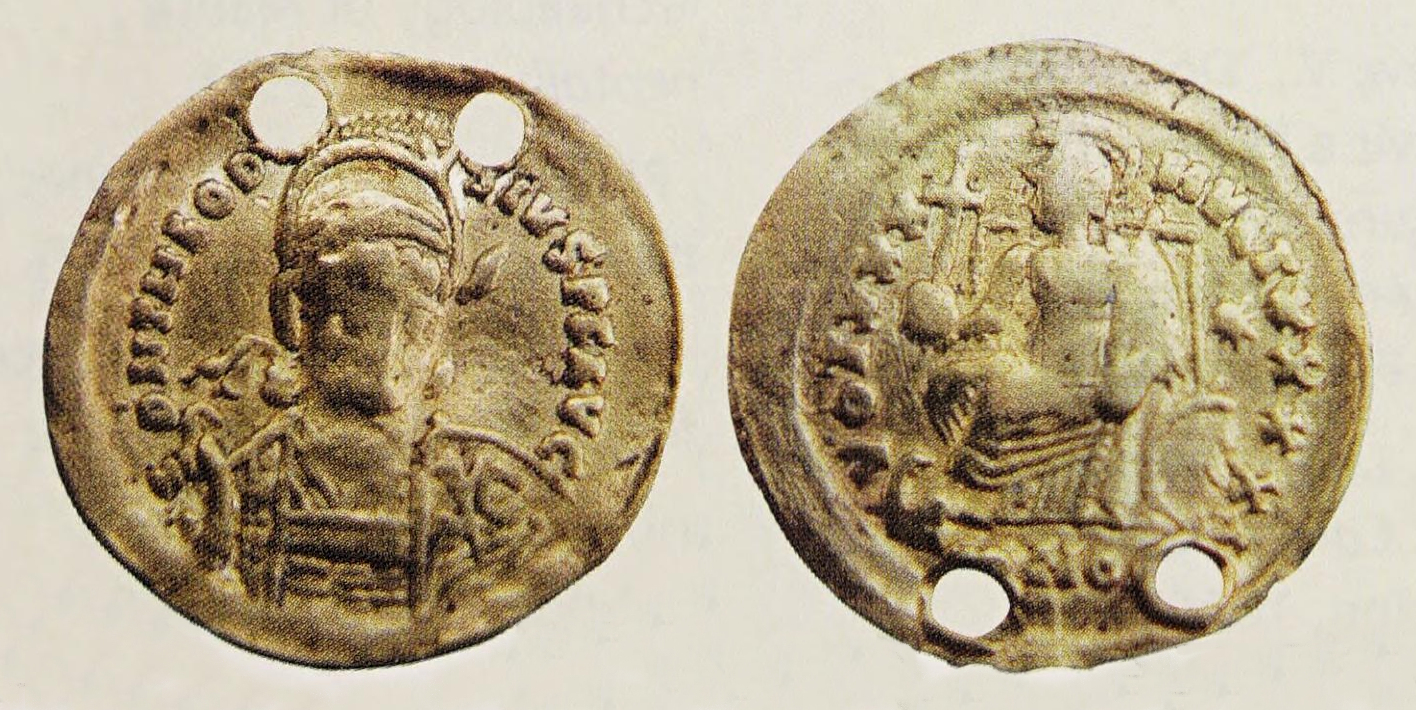
Coin of Byzantine Theodosius II (402–450), found in the excavations at the monastery

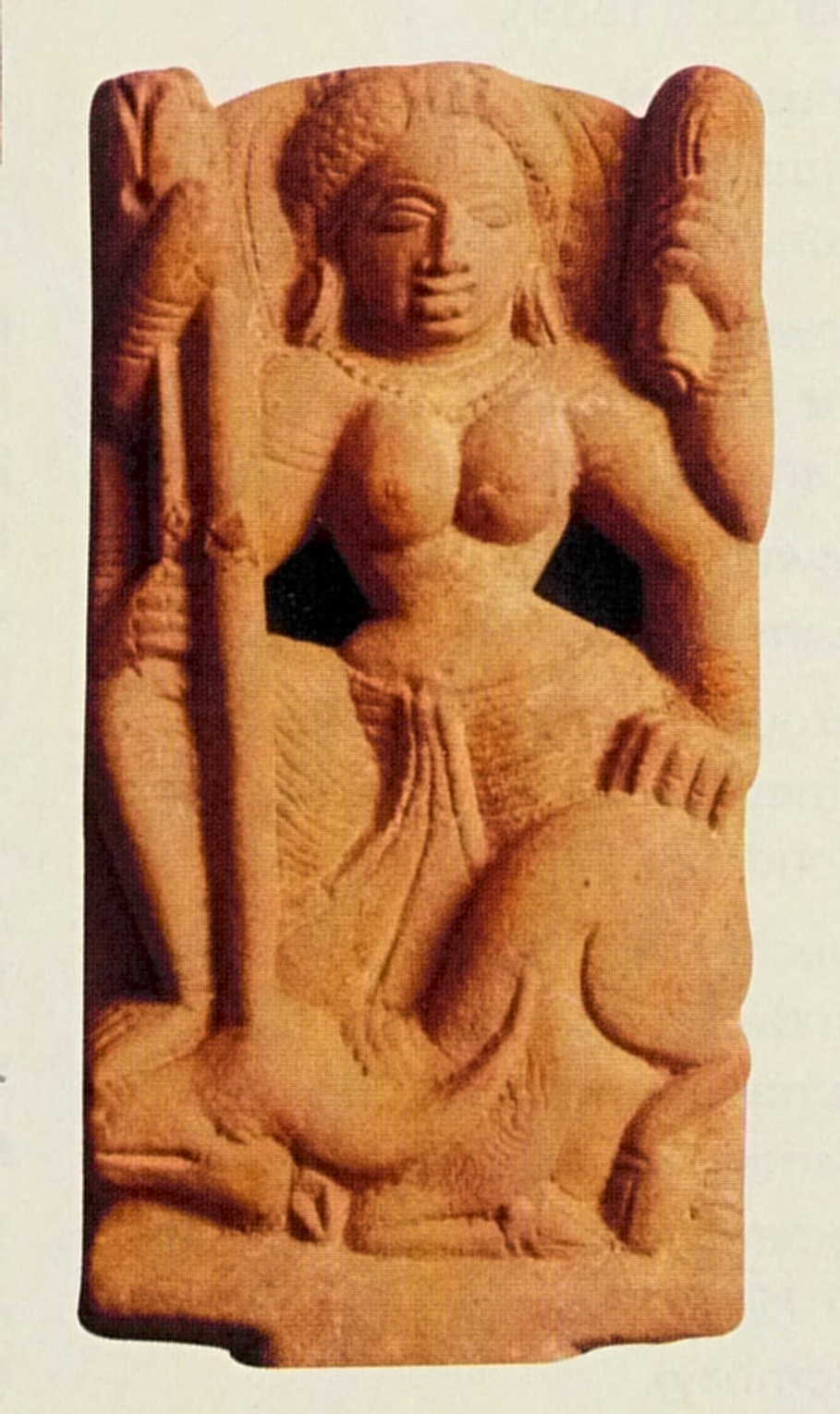
Terracotta plaque of Hindu goddess Mahishasuramardini found on the site

== Copies of the paintings ==
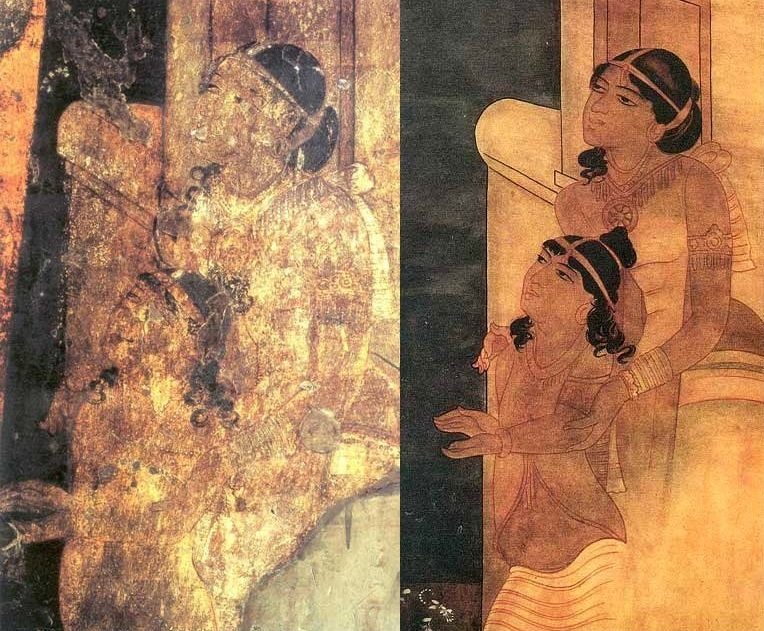
Detail: original left, copy by Lady Herringham (1915) right

The paintings have deteriorated significantly since they were rediscovered, and a number of 19th-century copies and drawings are important for a complete understanding of the works. A number of attempts to copy the Ajanta paintings began in the 19th century for European and Japanese museums. Some of these works have later been lost in natural and fire disasters. In 1846 for example, Major Robert Gill, an Army officer from Madras Presidency and a painter, was appointed by the Royal Asiatic Society to make copies of the frescos on the cave walls. Gill worked on his painting at the site from 1844 to 1863. He made 27 copies of large sections of murals, but all but four were destroyed in a fire at the Crystal Palace in London in 1866, where they were on display. Gill returned to the site, and recommenced his labours, replicating the murals until his death in 1875.

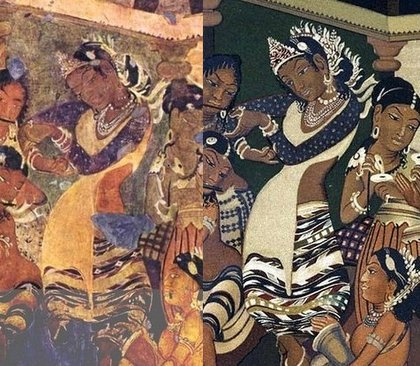
Dancing girl in Ajanta fresco; a 2012 photograph (left) and Robert Gill's 19th-century copy

Another attempt was made in 1872 when the Bombay Presidency commissioned John Griffiths to work with his students to make copies of Ajanta paintings, again for shipping to England. They worked on this for thirteen years and some 300 canvases were produced, many of which were displayed at the Imperial Institute on Exhibition Road in London, one of the forerunners of the Victoria and Albert Museum. But in 1885 another fire destroyed over a hundred of the paintings in storage in a wing of the museum. The V&A still has 166 paintings surviving from both sets, though none have been on permanent display since 1955. The largest are some 3 by 6 metres (9.8 ft × 19.7 ft). A conservation project was undertaken on about half of them in 2006, also involving the University of Northumbria. Griffith and his students had painted many of the paintings with "cheap varnish" in order to make them easier to see, which has added to the deterioration of the originals, as has, according to Spink and others, recent cleaning by the ASI.

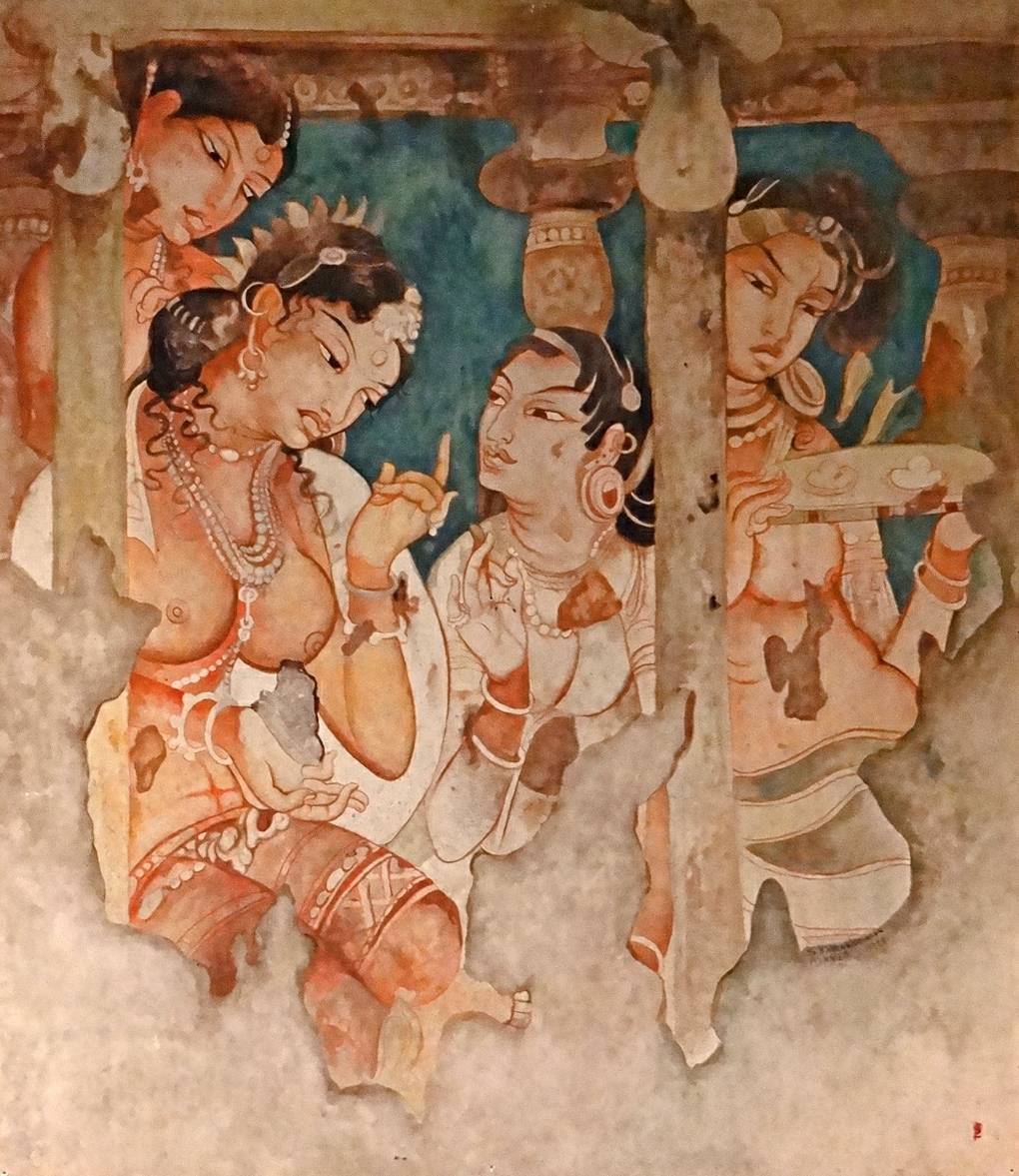
Copy of an Ajanta painting, in Musée Guimet, Paris. Part of a mural probably relating the conversion of Nanda, Cave 1.

A further set of copies was made between 1909 and 1911 by Christiana Herringham (Lady Herringham) and a group of students from the Calcutta School of Art that included the future Indian Modernist painter Nandalal Bose. The copies were published in full colour as the first publication of London's fledgling India Society. More than the earlier copies, these aimed to fill in holes and damage to recreate the original condition rather than record the state of the paintings as she was seeing them. According to one writer, unlike the paintings created by her predecessors Griffiths and Gill, whose copies were influenced by British Victorian styles of painting, those of the Herringham expedition preferred an 'Indian Renascence' aesthetic of the type pioneered by Abanindranath Tagore.

Early photographic surveys were made by Robert Gill, whose photos, including some using stereoscopy, were used in books by him and Fergusson (many are available online from the British Library), then Victor Goloubew in 1911 and E.L. Vassey, who took the photos in the four volume study of the caves by Ghulam Yazdani (published 1930–1955).

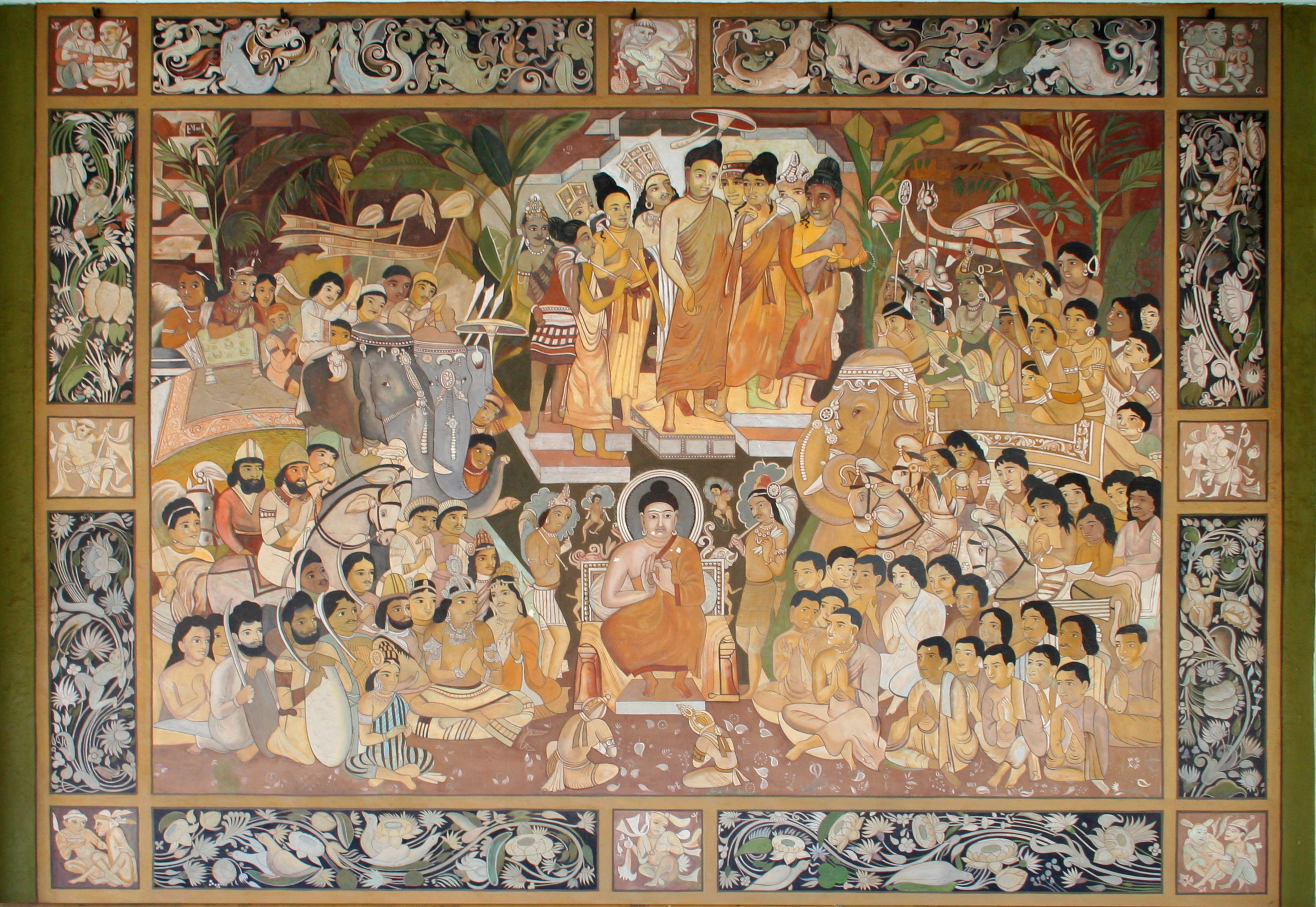
Reproduction of The Adoration of the Buddha, cave 17, Albert Hall Museum, Jaipur, India

Some slightly creative copies of Ajanta frescos, especially the painting of the Adoration of the Buddha from the shrine antechamber of Cave 17, were commissioned by Thomas Holbein Hendley (1847–1917) for the decoration of the walls of the hall of the Albert Hall Museum, Jaipur, India. He had the work painted by a local artist variously named Murli or Murali. The museum was opened to the public in 1887. This work is otherwise presented as characteristic of the end of the 19th century.

Another attempt to make copies of the murals was made by the Japanese artist Arai Kampō (荒井寛方:1878–1945) after being invited by Rabindranath Tagore to India to teach Japanese painting techniques. He worked on making copies with tracings on Japanese paper from 1916 to 1918 and his work was conserved at Tokyo Imperial University until the materials perished during the 1923 Great Kantō earthquake.

== Reception history ==
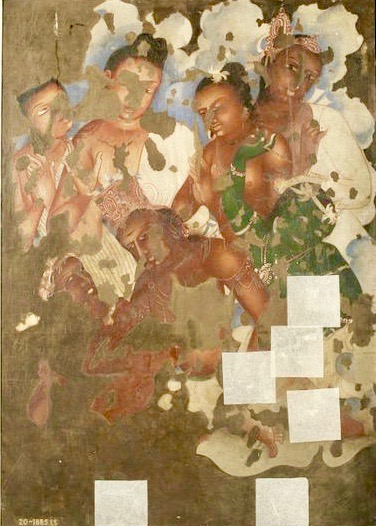
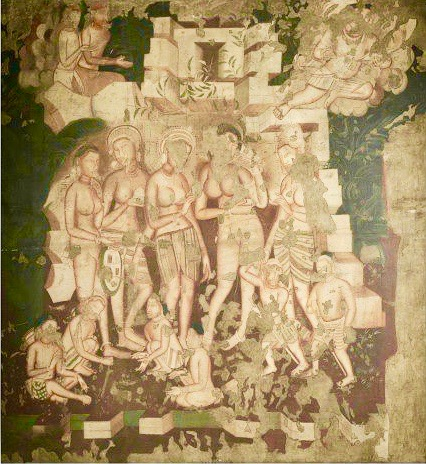
Ajanta arts predominantly show natives. Left: people discussing the king's renunciation; Right: sadhus or brahmakayikas heading to a temple, five women chatting in a market square, children playing a board game near a banana tree.

The Ajanta cave arts are a window into the culture, society and religiosity of the native population of India between the 2nd century BCE and 5th century CE. Different scholars have variously interpreted them from the perspective of gender studies, history, sociology, and the anthropology of South Asia. The dress, the jewellery, the gender relations, the social activities depicted show at least the lifestyle of the royalty and elite, and in others definitely the costumes of the common man, monks and rishi. They shine "light on life in India" around mid 1st millennium CE.

The Ajanta paintings provide a contrast between the spiritual life of monks who had given up all materialistic possessions versus the sensual life of those it considered materialistic, luxurious, symbols of wealth, leisurely and high fashion. Many frescos show scenes from shops, festivals, jesters at processions, palaces and performance art pavilions. These friezes share themes and details of those found in Bharhut, Sanchi, Amaravati, Ellora, Bagh, Aihole, Badami and other archaeological sites in India. Ajanta caves contributes to visual and descriptive sense of the ancient and early medieval Indian culture and artistic traditions, particularly those around the Gupta Empire era period.

Orientalism and Ajanta Caves
In the early nineteenth century, when Europeans first visited the Ajanta caves, they had no literary precedents through which to determine what they saw. Thus they saw very little beyond hunting scenes, domestic scenes, seraglio scenes, Welsh wigs, Hampton court beauties, elephants and horses, an Abyssinian black prince, shields and spears, and statues that they called 'Buddha' because of the curly hair.

— Richard Cohen
Beyond Enlightenment: Buddhism, Religion, Modernity

The earliest colonial era descriptions of the Ajanta caves was largely orientalist and critical. According to William Dalrymple, the subjects in the Ajanta caves were puzzling to 19th-century Orientalists. Lacking the Asian cultural heritage and with no knowledge of Jataka Tales or equivalent Indian fables, they could not comprehend it. They projected their own views and assumptions, calling it something that lacks reason and rationale, something that is a meaningless crude representation of royalty and foreigners with mysticism and sensuousness. The 19th-century views and interpretations of the Ajanta Caves were conditioned by ideas and assumptions in the colonial mind, saw what they wanted to see.

To many who are unaware of the premises of Indian religions in general, and Buddhism in particular, the significance of Ajanta Caves has been like the rest of Indian art. According to Richard Cohen, the Ajanta Caves to them has been yet another example of "worship this stock, or that stone, or monstrous idol". In contrast, to the Indian mind and the larger Buddhist community, it is everything that art ought to be, the religious and the secular, the spiritual and the social fused to enlightened perfection.

According to Walter Spink – one of the most respected Art historians on Ajanta, these caves were by 475 CE a much-revered site to the Indians, with throngs of "travelers, pilgrims, monks and traders". The site was vastly transformed into its current form in just 20 years, between early 460 CE to early 480 CE, by regional architects and artisans. This accomplishment, states Spink, makes Ajanta, "one of the most remarkable creative achievements in man's history".

=== Foreigners in the paintings of Ajanta ===
The Ajanta Caves painting are a significant source of socio-economic information in ancient India, particularly in relation to the interactions of India with foreign cultures at the time most of the paintings were made, in the 5th century CE (Common Era). According to Indian historian Haroon Khan Sherwani: "The paintings at Ajanta clearly demonstrate the cosmopolitan character of Buddhism, which opened its way to men of all races, Greek, Persian, Saka, Pahlava, Kushan and Huna". Depictions of foreigners abound: according to Spink, "Ajanta's paintings are filled with such foreign types." They have sometimes been a source of misinterpretation as in the so-called "Persian Embassy Scene". These foreigners may reflect the Sassanian merchants, visitors and the flourishing trade routes of the day.

The so-called "Persian Embassy Scene"

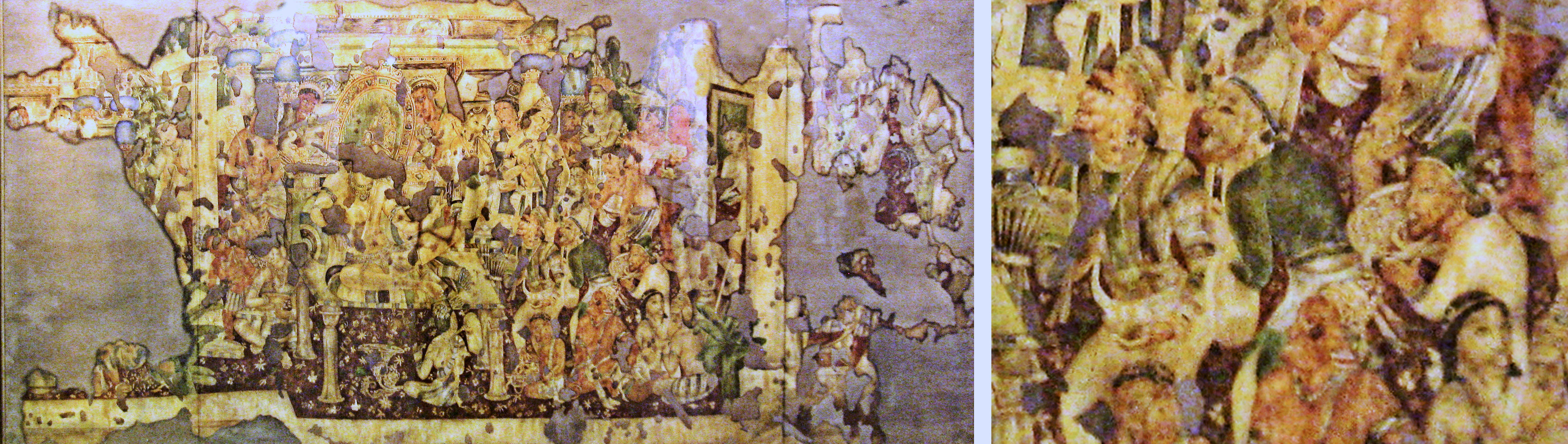
Upper part of the so-called "Persian Embassy Scene", with detail of the foreigners.

Cave 1, for example, shows a mural fresco with characters with foreigner faces or dresses, the so-called "Persian Embassy Scene". This scene is located at the right of the entrance door upon entering the hall. According to Spink, James Fergusson, a 19th-century architectural historian, had decided that this scene corresponded to the Persian ambassador in 625 CE to the court of the Hindu Chalukya king Pulakeshin II. An alternate theory has been that the fresco represents a Hindu ambassador visiting the Persian king Khusrau II in 625 CE, a theory that Fergusson disagreed with. These assumptions by colonial British era art historians, state Spink and other scholars, has been responsible for wrongly dating this painting to the 7th century, when in fact this reflects an incomplete Harisena-era painting of a Jataka tale (the Mahasudarsana jataka, in which the enthroned king is actually the Buddha in one of his previous lives as King) with the representation of trade between India and distant lands such as Sassanian near East that was common by the 5th century.

International trade, growth of Buddhism

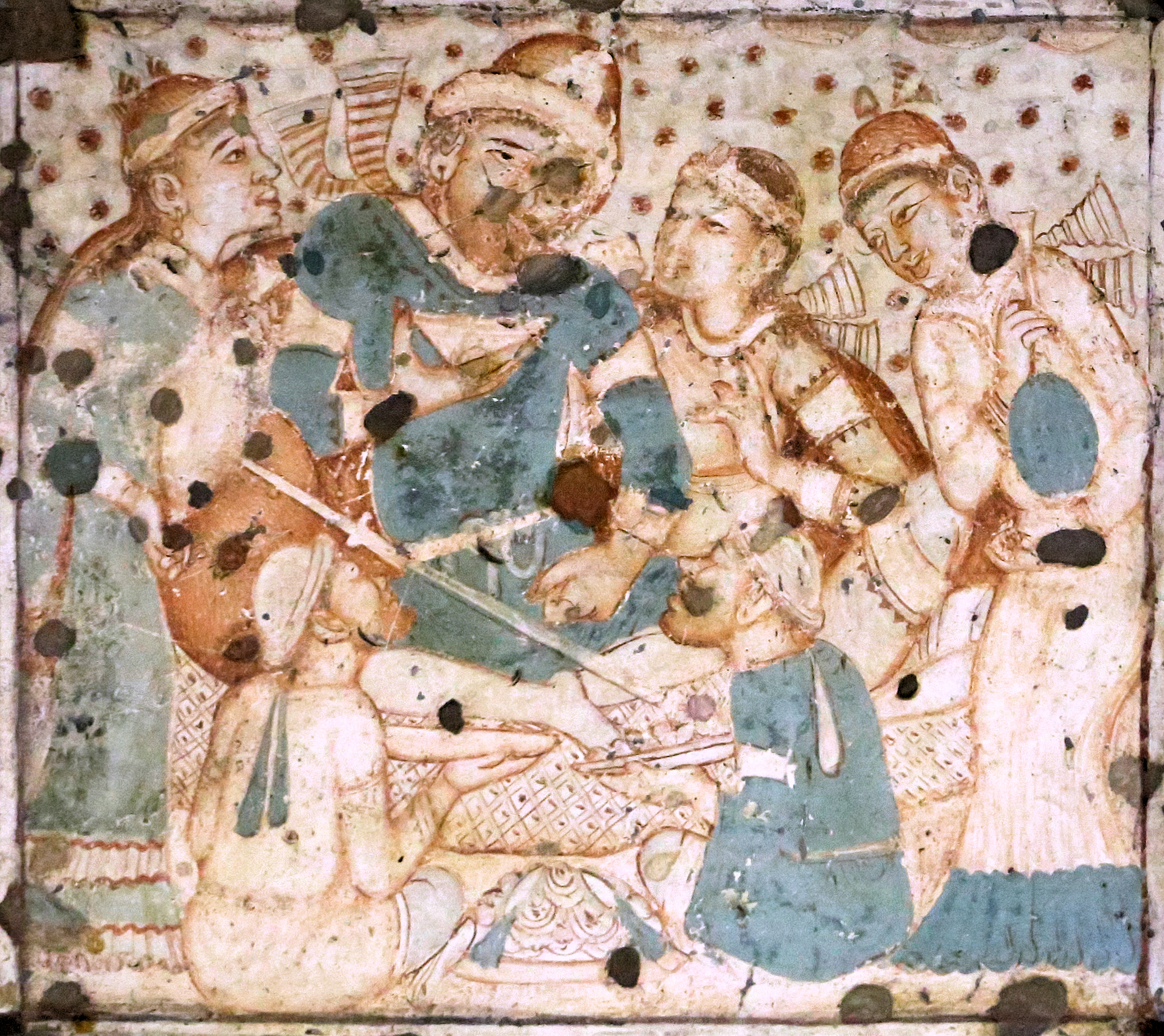
A foreigner in Sasanian dress drinking wine, on the ceiling of the central hall of Cave 1, likely a generic scene from an object imported from Central Asia (460–480 CE) The men depicted in these paintings may also have been Bactrians, at that time under Hephthalite rule.

Cave 1 has several frescos with characters with foreigners' faces or dresses. Similar depictions are found in the paintings of Cave 17. Such murals, states Pia Brancaccio, suggest a prosperous and multicultural society in 5th-century India active in international trade. These also suggest that this trade was economically important enough to the Deccan region that the artists chose to include it with precision.

Additional evidence of international trade includes the use of the blue lapis lazuli pigment to depict foreigners in the Ajanta paintings, which must have been imported from Afghanistan or Iran. It also suggests, states Brancaccio, that the Buddhist monastic world was closely connected with trading guilds and the court culture in this period. A small number of scenes show foreigners drinking wine in Caves 1 and 2. (Note: In Cave 1, there are also four "foreign" bacchanalian groups (one now missing) at the middle of each quadrant of the elaborate ceiling painting. Cave 2 shows two foreigners, possibly from Central Asia, sharing wine. These scenes, interprets Brancaccio, show what are probably foreign ewers from Sogdia or Persia were used to consume imported wines. A text from the Periplus of the Erythrean Sea era states that silverware vessels and wine was one of the main products imported for kings of Barygaza. Sassanian bowls dated to about 400 CE have been discovered in other parts of the Indian subcontinent. A copper plate in the Kanheri caves near Mumbai indicates that foreigners were active in trade in the city of Kalyan in the 5th century CE.) Some show foreign Near East kings with wine and their retinue which presumably add to the "general regal emphasis" of the cave. According to Brancaccio, the Ajanta paintings show a variety of colorful, delicate textiles and women making cotton. Textile probably was one of the major exports to foreign lands, along with gems. These were exported first through the Red Sea, and later through the Persian Gulf, thereby bringing a period of economic and cultural exchange between the Indians, the Sasanian Empire and the Persian merchants before Islam was founded in the Arabian peninsula.

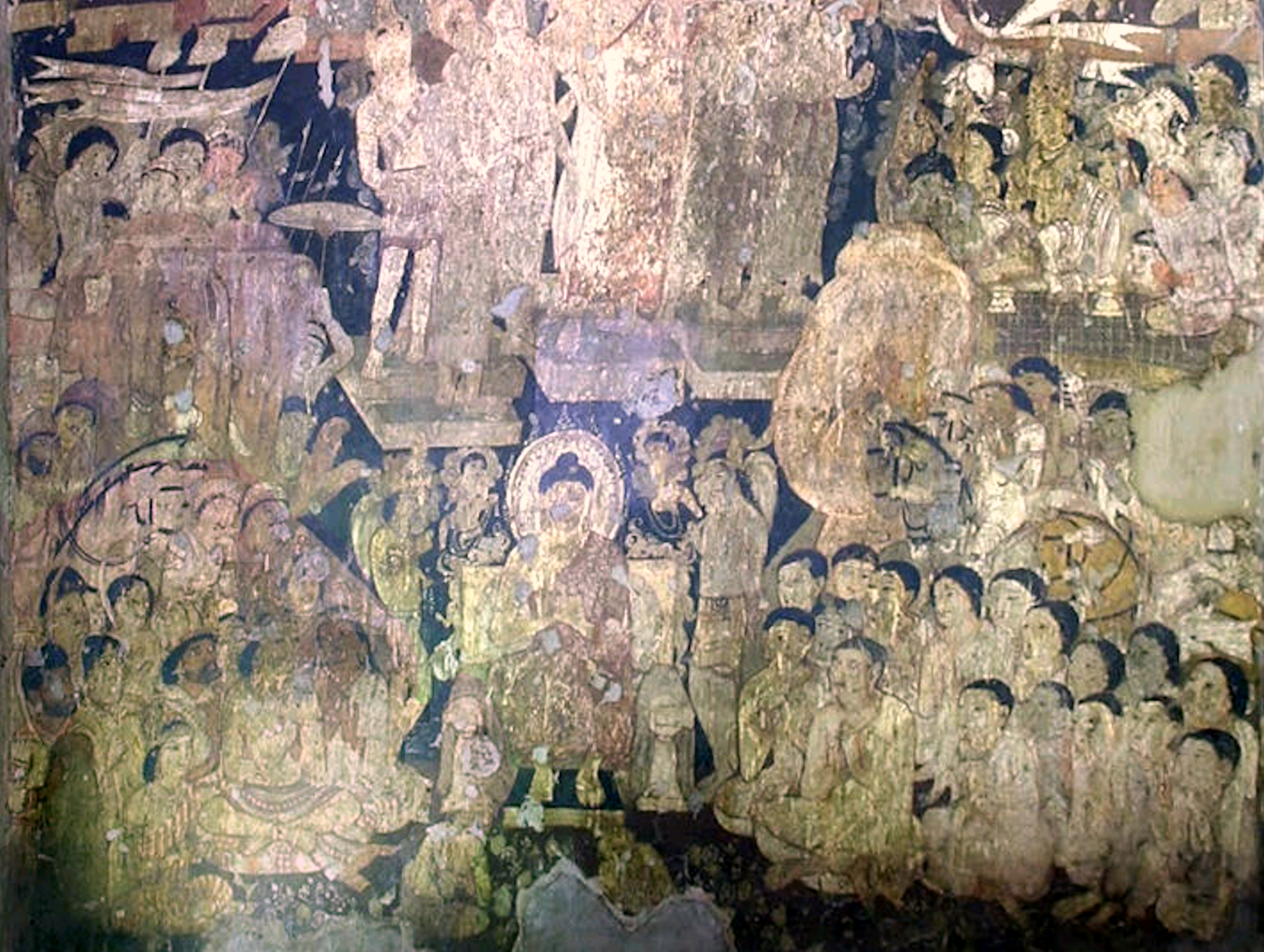
Cave 17: many foreigners are included as devotees attending the Buddha's descent from Trayastrimsa Heaven (Note: Actual photograph are available on Google.)

While scholars generally agree that these murals confirm trade and cultural connections between India and Sassanian west, their specific significance and interpretation varies. Brancaccio, for example, suggests that the ship and jars in them probably reflect foreign ships carrying wine imported to India. In contrast, Schlinghoff interprets the jars to be holding water, and ships shown as Indian ships used in international trade.

Similar depictions are found in the paintings of Cave 17, but this time in direct relation to the worship of the Buddha. In Cave 17, a painting of the Buddha descending from the Trayastrimsa Heaven shows he being attended by many foreigners. Many foreigners in this painting are thus shown as listeners to the Buddhist Dharma. The ethnic diversity is depicted in the painting in the clothes (kaftans, Sasanian helmets, round caps), hairdos and skin colors. In the Visvantara Jataka of Cave 17, according to Brancaccio, the scene probably shows a servant from Central Asia holding a foreign metal ewer, while a dark-complexioned servant holds a cup to an amorous couple. In another painting in Cave 17, relating to the conversion of Nanda, a man possibly from northeast Africa appears as a servant. These representations show, states Brancaccio, that the artists were familiar with people of Sogdia, Central Asia, Persia and possibly East Africa. (Note: The expansion of Buddhism into Gandhara and Central Asia began during the 1st millennium BCE. Some early Buddhist worship halls in western India included Yavanas (Greeks) as donors. Inscriptions recording such donations are found at Karla Caves, Pandavleni Caves or Manmodi Caves.) Another hypothesis is offered by Upadhya, who states that the artists who built Ajanta caves "very probably included foreigners".

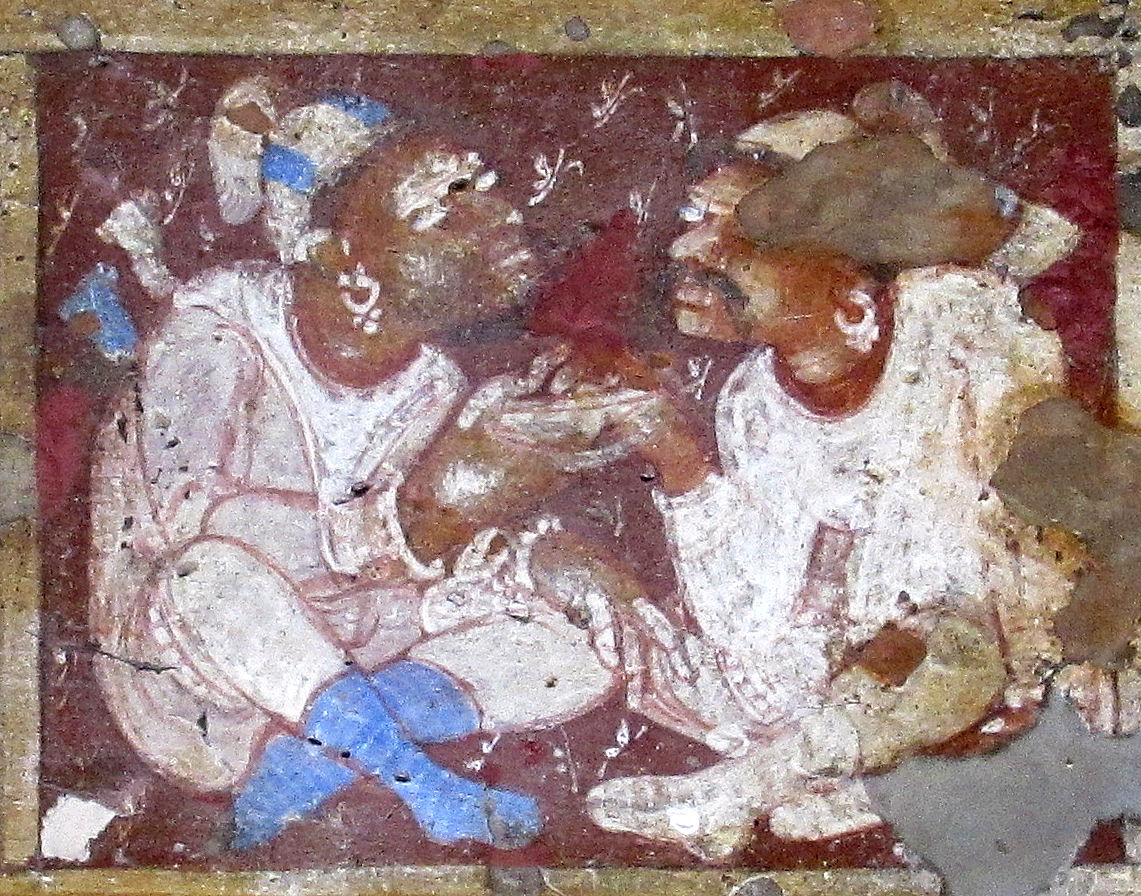
Cave 2, ceiling: foreigners sharing a drink of wine

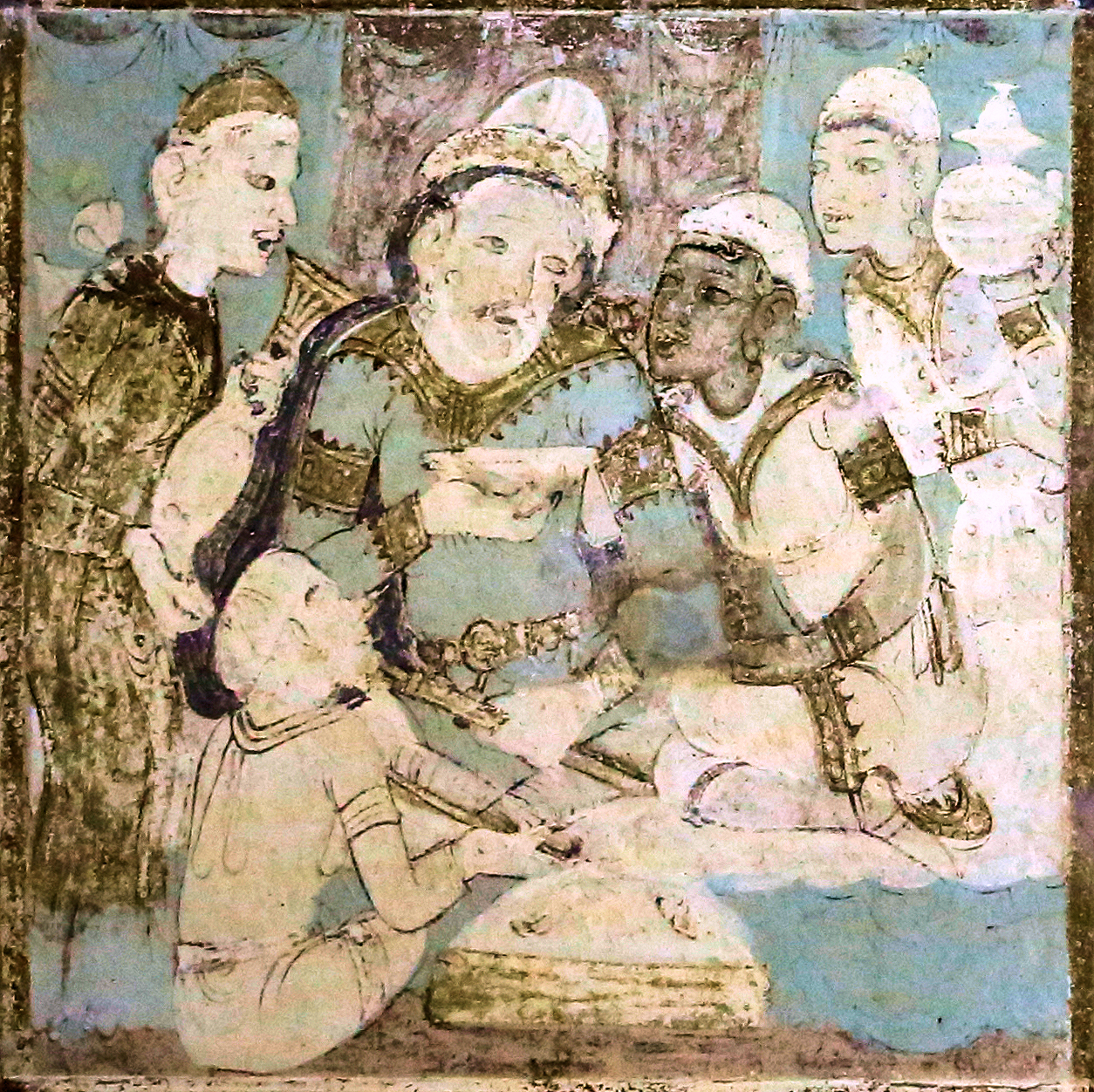
Cave 1, ceiling: another Persian-style foreign group, one of the four such groups (one now missing) at the center of each quadrant of the ceiling

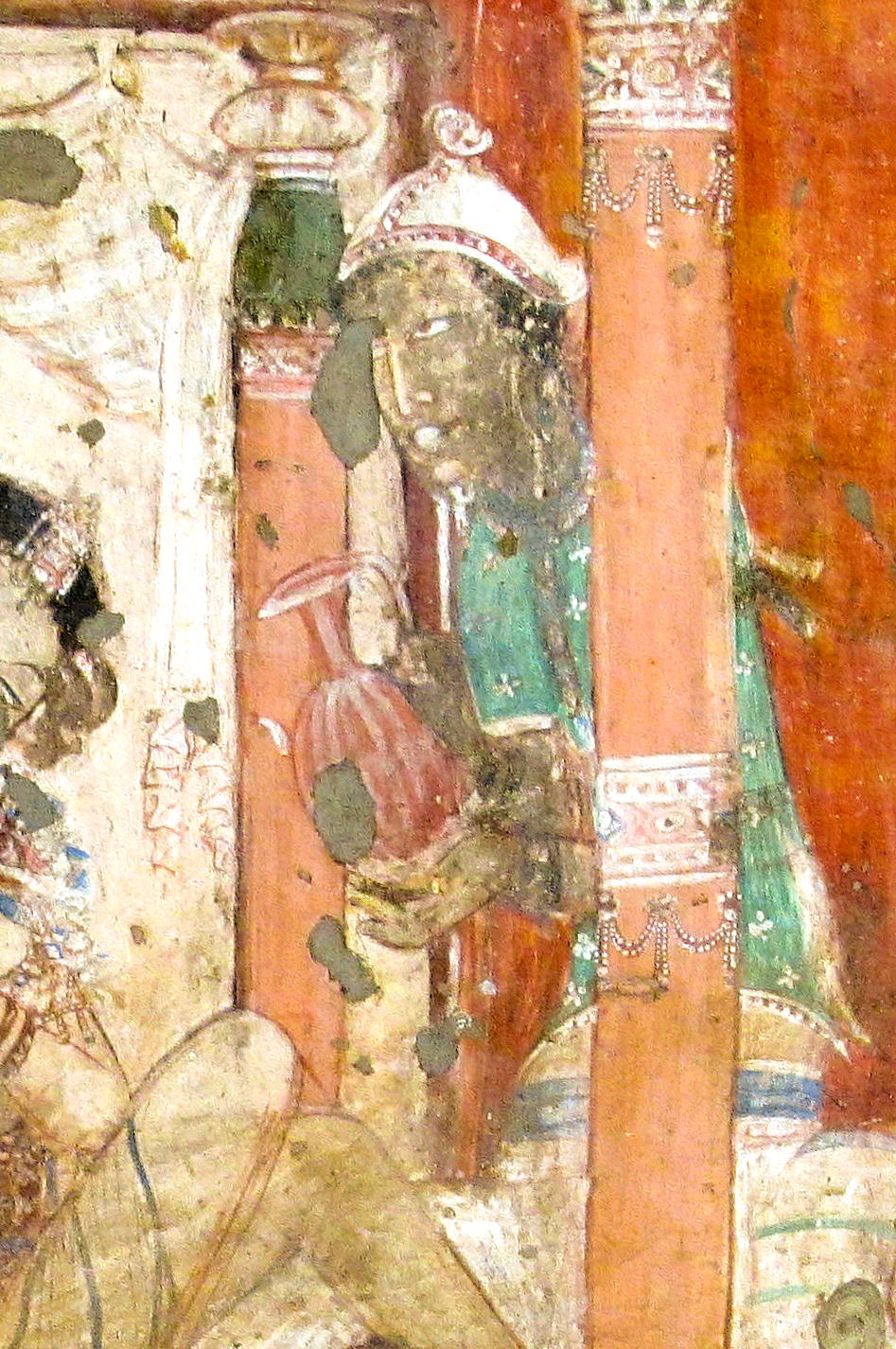
A servant from Central Asia, Cave 17.

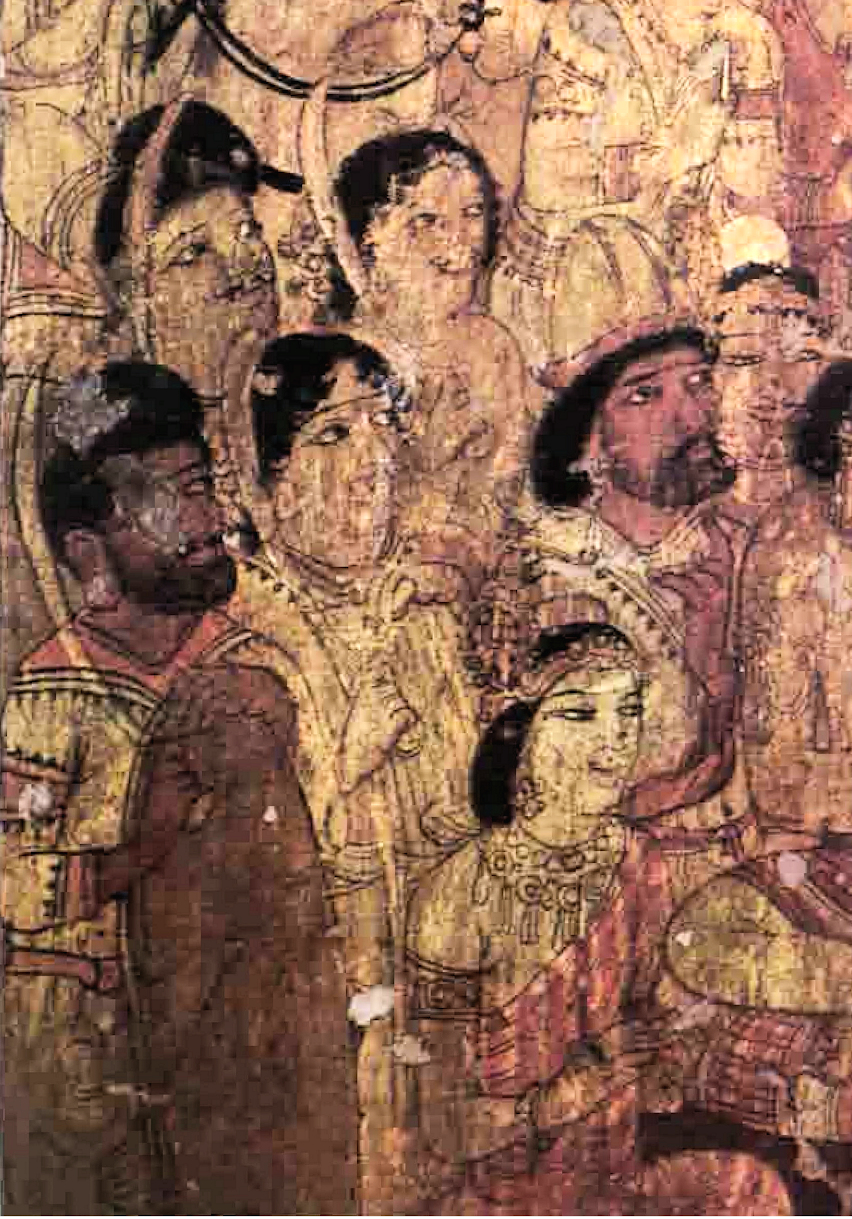
Cave 17: foreigners attending the Buddha

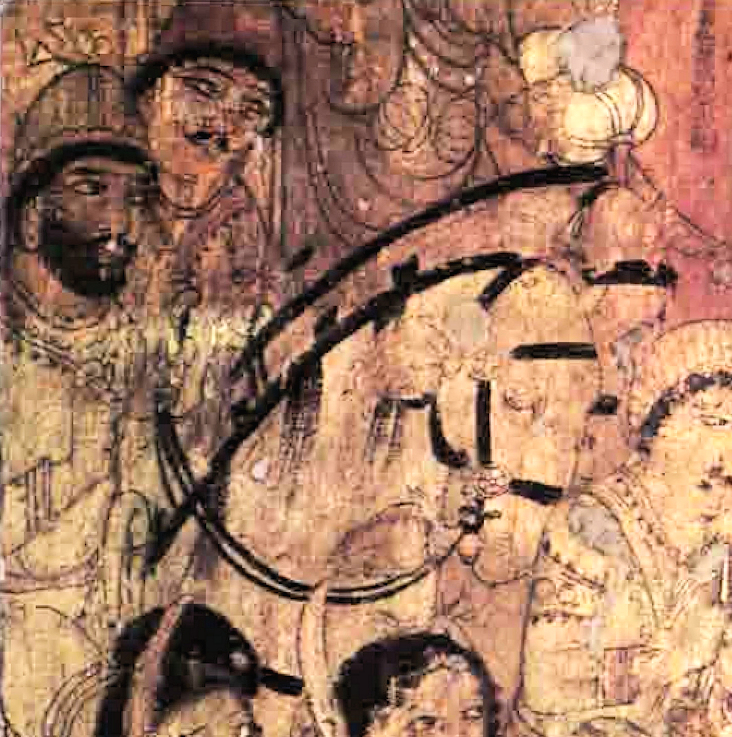
Cave 17: foreigners on horses attending the Buddha

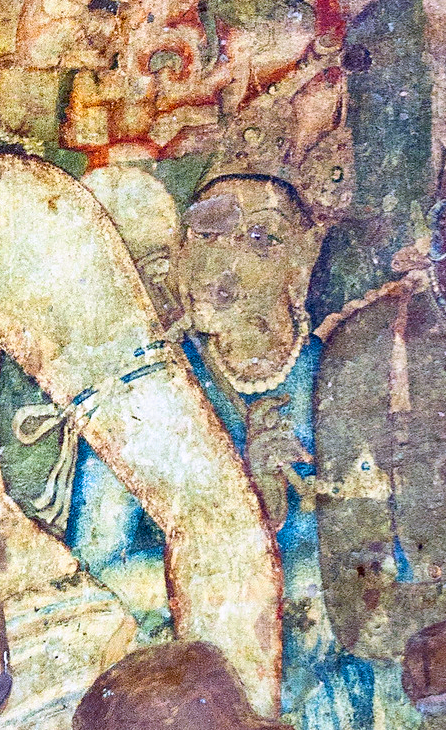
Lady in blue dress with tiara, of possible "Persian origin"."

== Impact on later painting and other arts ==
The Ajanta paintings, or more likely the general style they come from, influenced painting in Tibet and Sri Lanka. Some influences from Ajanta have also suggested in the Kizil Caves of the Tarim Basin, in particular in early caves such as the Peacock Cave.

The rediscovery of ancient Indian paintings at Ajanta provided Indian artists with examples from ancient India to follow. Nandalal Bose experimented with techniques to follow the ancient style which allowed him to develop his unique style. Abanindranath Tagore and Syed Thajudeen also used the Ajanta paintings for inspiration.

Anna Pavlova's ballet Ajanta's Frescoes was inspired by her visit to Ajanta, choreographed by Ivan Clustine, with music by Nikolai Tcherepnin (one report says Mikhail Fokine in 1923). and premiered at Covent Garden in 1923.

Jewish American poet Muriel Rukeyser wrote about the caves in "Ajanta," the opening poem of her third collection Beast in View (1944). Rukeyser was inspired in part by writings on the caves by artist Mukul Dey in 1925 and art historian Stella Kramrisch in 1937.

== See also ==
- Cetiya
- Bedse Caves
- Bhaja Caves
- Dambulla cave temple
- Kanheri Caves
- Karla Caves
- Mogao Caves
- Nasik Caves
- Pitalkhora Caves
- Shivneri Caves
- List of colossal sculptures in situ
