= Geographical indications in India =

A geographical indication (GI) is a name or sign used on certain products which corresponds to a specific geographical location or origin (e.g., a town, region, or country). India, as a member of the World Trade Organization (WTO), enacted the Geographical Indications of Goods (Registration and Protection) Act, 1999, which came into effect from 15 September 2003. GIs have been defined under Article 22 (1) of the Agreement on Trade-Related Aspects of Intellectual Property Rights (TRIPS) as: "indications which identify a good as originating in the territory of a Member, or a region or locality in that territory, where a given quality, reputation or other characteristic of the good is essentially attributable to its geographic origin."

The GI tag ensures that none other than those registered as authorized users (or at least those residing inside the geographic territory) are allowed to use the popular product name. Darjeeling tea was the first GI recognized by Government of India in 2004–05.

== Registered geographical indications ==
As of 2026, there are 822 registered geographical indications in India:

Serial no.	Application no.	Geographical indication	Type	State/UT or Country	Year
1	1 & 2	Darjeeling Tea	Agricultural	West Bengal	2004–05
2	3	Aranmula Kannadi	Handicraft	Kerala	2004–05
3	4	Pochampally sari	Handicraft	Telangana	2004–05
4	5	Salem fabric	Handicraft	Tamil Nadu	2004–05
5	7	Chanderi sarees	Handicraft	Madhya Pradesh	2004–05
6	8	Solapuri chaddar	Handicraft	Maharashtra	2004–05
7	9	Solapur Terry Towel	Handicraft	Maharashtra	2004–05
8	10	Kotpad Handloom fabrics	Handicraft	Odisha	2004–05
9	11	Mysore silk	Handicraft	Karnataka	2004–05
10	12	Kota Doria	Handicraft	Rajasthan	2004–05
11	13 & 18	Mysore Agarbathi	Manufactured	Karnataka	2004–05
12	15	Kancheepuram Silk	Handicraft	Tamil Nadu	2004–05
13	16	Bhavani Jamakkalam	Handicraft	Tamil Nadu	2004–05
14	19	Kullu Shawl	Handicraft	Himachal Pradesh	2004–05
15	20	Bidriware	Handicraft	Karnataka	2004–05
16	21	Madurai Sungudi	Handicraft	Tamil Nadu	2004–05
17	22	Orissa Ikat	Handicraft	Odisha	2004–05
18	23	Channapatna toys and dolls	Handicraft	Karnataka	2004–05
19	24	Mysore Rosewood Inlay	Handicraft	Karnataka	2004–05
20	25	Kangra Tea	Agricultural	Himachal Pradesh	2004–05
21	26	Coimbatore Wet Grinder	Manufactured	Tamil Nadu	2004–05
22	28	Srikalahasthi Kalamkari	Handicraft	Andhra Pradesh	2004–05
23	29	Mysore Sandalwood Oil	Manufactured	Karnataka	2004–05
24	30	Mysore Sandal soap	Manufactured	Karnataka	2004–05
25	31	Kasuti embroidery	Handicraft	Karnataka	2004–05
26	32	Mysore Traditional Paintings	Handicraft	Karnataka	2004–05
27	33	Coorg orange	Agricultural	Karnataka	2004–05
28	34	Mysore betel leaf	Agricultural	Karnataka	2006–07
29	35	Nanjanagud Banana	Agricultural	Karnataka	2006–07
30	37	Madhubani paintings	Handicraft	Bihar	2006–07
31	44	Kondapalli bommallu	Handicraft	Andhra Pradesh	2007–08
32	47	Thanjavur Paintings	Handicraft	Tamil Nadu	2007–08
33	53	Silver Filigree of Karimnagar	Handicraft	Telangana	2007–08
34	54	Alleppey Coir	Handicraft	Kerala	2007–08
35	55	Muga silk of Assam	Handicraft	Assam	2007–08
36	65	Temple Jewellery of Nagercoil	Handicraft	Tamil Nadu	2007–08
37	69	Mysore Malligae	Agricultural	Karnataka	2007–08
38	70	Udupi Malligae	Agricultural	Karnataka	2007–08
39	71	Hadagali Malligae	Agricultural	Karnataka	2007–08
40	17	Navara rice	Agricultural	Kerala	2007–08
41	36	Palakkadan Matta rice	Agricultural	Kerala	2007–08
42	63	Thanjavur Art Plate	Handicraft	Tamil Nadu	2007–08
43	76	Ilkal sarees	Handicraft	Karnataka	2007–08
44	73	Applique (khatwa) work of Bihar	Handicraft	Bihar	2007–08
45	74	Sujini embroidery work of Bihar	Handicraft	Bihar	2007–08
46	75	Sikki Grass Products of Bihar	Handicraft	Bihar	2007–08
47	49 & 56	Malabar pepper	Agricultural	Kerala, Karnataka, Tamil Nadu	2007–08
48	50	Allahabad Surkha guava	Agricultural	Uttar Pradesh	2007–08
49	52	Nakshi Kantha	Handicraft	West Bengal	2007–08
50	60	Ganjifa Cards of Mysore	Handicraft	Karnataka	2007–08
51	61	Navalgund Durries	Handicraft	Karnataka	2007–08
52	62	Karnataka Bronzeware	Handicraft	Karnataka	2007–08
53	77	Molakalmuru sarees	Handicraft	Karnataka	2007–08
54	85	Monsooned Malabar Arabica Coffee	Agricultural	Karnataka, Kerala	2007–08
55	114	Monsooned Malabar Robusta Coffee	Agricultural	Karnataka, Kerala	2007–08
56	72	Alleppey Green Cardamom	Agricultural	Tamil Nadu, Kerala	2007–08
57	78	Coorg Green Cardamom	Agricultural	Karnataka	2007–08
58	95	East India Leather	Manufactured	Tamil Nadu	2007–08
59	94	Salem Venpattu	Handicraft	Tamil Nadu	2007–08
60	93	Kovai Kora cotton sarees	Handicraft	Tamil Nadu	2007–08
61	92	Arani Silk	Handicraft	Tamil Nadu	2007–08
62	83	Bastar Dhokra	Handicraft	Chhattisgarh	2008–09
63	84	Bastar Wooden Craft	Handicraft	Chhattisgarh	2008–09
64	91	Nirmal toys and craft	Handicraft	Telangana	2008–09
65	59	Maddalam of Palakkad	Handicraft	Kerala	2008–09
66	58	Screw Pine Craft of Kerala	Handicraft	Kerala	2008–09
67	64	Swamimalai Bronze Icons	Handicraft	Tamil Nadu	2008–09
68	82	Bastar Iron Craft	Handicraft	Chhattisgarh	2008–09
69	87	Konark stone carving	Handicraft	Odisha	2008–09
70	88	Orissa Pattachitra	Handicraft	Odisha	2008–09
71	90	Machilipatnam Kalamkari	Handicraft	Andhra Pradesh	2008–09
72	110	Eathomozhy Tall Coconut	Agricultural	Tamil Nadu	2008–09
73	57	Brass Broidered Coconut Shell Crafts of Kerala	Handicraft	Kerala	2008–09
74	66	Blue Pottery of Jaipur	Handicraft	Rajasthan	2008–09
75	67	Molela Clay Work	Handicraft	Rajasthan	2008–09
76	68	Kathputlis of Rajasthan	Handicraft	Rajasthan	2008–09
77	97	Leather Toys of Indore	Handicraft	Madhya Pradesh	2008–09
78	98	Bagh Prints of Madhya Pradesh	Handicraft	Madhya Pradesh	2008–09
79	100	Sankheda Furniture	Handicraft	Gujarat	2008–09
80	101	Agates of Cambay	Handicraft	Gujarat	2008–09
81	102	Bell Metal Ware of Datia and Tikamgarh	Handicraft	Madhya Pradesh	2008–09
82	103	Kutch Embroidery	Handicraft	Gujarat	2008–09
83	51	Kani Shawl	Handicraft	Jammu and Kashmir	2008–09
84	79	Chamba Rumal	Handicraft	Himachal Pradesh	2008–09
85	80	Dharwad Pedha	Food stuff	Karnataka	2008–09
86	81	Pokkali Rice	Agricultural	Kerala	2008–09
87	86 & 108	Pipli Applique Work	Handicraft	Odisha	2008–09
88	89	Budithi Bell and Brass Craft	Handicraft	Andhra Pradesh	2008–09
89	96	Thanjavur Doll	Handicraft	Tamil Nadu	2008–09
90	104	Santiniketan Leather Goods	Handicraft	West Bengal	2008–09
91	105	Nirmal furniture	Handicraft	Telangana	2008–09
92	106	Nirmal paintings	Handicraft	Telangana	2008–09
93	107	Andhra Pradesh leather puppetry	Handicraft	Andhra Pradesh	2008–09
94	111	Malda Laxman Bhog mango	Agricultural	West Bengal	2008–09
95	112	Malda Khirsapati (Himsagar) mango	Agricultural	West Bengal	2008–09
96	113	Malda Fazli mango	Agricultural	West Bengal	2008–09
97	46	Kashmir Pashmina	Handicraft	Jammu and Kashmir	2008–09
98	48	Kashmir Sozani Craft	Handicraft	Jammu and Kashmir	2008–09
99	109	Naga Mircha	Agricultural	Nagaland	2008–09
100	116 & 117	Nilgiri (orthodox)	Agricultural	Tamil Nadu	2008–09
101	115 & 118	Assam (orthodox)	Agricultural	Assam	2008–09
102	119	Lucknow Chikan Craft	Handicraft	Uttar Pradesh	2008–09
103	124	Virupakshi Hill Banana	Agricultural	Tamil Nadu	2008–09
104	126	Sirumalai Hill Banana	Agricultural	Tamil Nadu	2008–09
105	120	Feni	Manufactured	Goa	2008–09
106	122	Uppada Jamdani sarees	Handicraft	Andhra Pradesh	2008–09
107	121	Tirupathi Laddu	Food stuff	Andhra Pradesh	2009–10
108	125	Mango Malihabadi Dusseheri	Agricultural	Uttar Pradesh	2009–10
109	128	Puneri Pagadi	Handicraft	Maharashtra	2009–10
110	99	Banaras brocades and sarees	Handicraft	Uttar Pradesh	2009–10
111	127	Tangaliya Shawl	Handicraft	Gujarat	2009–10
112	130 & 141	Vazhakulam pineapple	Agricultural	Kerala	2009–10
113	131	Devanahalli Pomello	Agricultural	Karnataka	2009–10
114	132	Appemidi Mango	Agricultural	Karnataka	2009–10
115	133	Kamalapur Red Banana	Agricultural	Karnataka	2009–10
116	138	Santipore saree	Handicraft	West Bengal	2009–10
117	144	Cannanore Home Furnishings	Handicraft	Kerala	2009–10
119	147	Sanganeri hand block printing	Handicraft	Rajasthan	2009–10
120	152	Balaramapuram sarees and fine cotton fabrics	Handicraft	Kerala	2009–10
121	142	Bikaneri Bhujia	Food stuff	Rajasthan	2010–11
122	143	Guntur Sannam Chilli	Agricultural	Andhra Pradesh	2010–11
123	123	Nashik valley wine	Manufactured	Maharashtra	2010–11
124	137	Gadwal sarees	Handicraft	Telangana	2010–11
125	149	Kinnauri Shawl	Handicraft	Himachal Pradesh	2010–11
126	170	Kasaragod sarees	Handicraft	Kerala	2010–11
127	179	Kuthampully sarees	Handicraft	Kerala	2010–11
128	134	Sandur Lambani Embroidery	Handicraft	Karnataka	2010–11
129	148	Hand Made Carpet of Bhadohi	Handicraft	Uttar Pradesh	2010–11
130	150 & 153	Paithani sarees and fabrics	Handicraft	Maharashtra	2010–11
131	154	Mahabaleshwar Strawberry	Agricultural	Maharashtra	2010–11
132	193	Hyderabad Haleem	Food stuff	Telangana	2010–11
134	146	Napa Valley	Manufactured	United States of America	2010–11
135	163	Central Travancore Jaggery	Agricultural	Kerala	2010–11
136	172	Champa silk saree and fabrics	Handicraft	Chhattisgarh	2010–11
137	186	Wayanad Jeerakasala rice	Agricultural	Kerala	2010–11
138	187	Wayanad Gandhakasala rice	Agricultural	Kerala	2010–11
139	191	Kota Doria (logo)	Handicraft	Rajasthan	2010–11
140	165	Nashik Grapes	Agricultural	Maharashtra	2010–11
141	171	Surat Zari Craft	Handicraft	Gujarat	2010–11
142	190	Cheriyal Paintings	Handicraft	Telangana	2010–11
143	194	Pembarthi Metal Craft	Handicraft	Telangana	2010–11
144	6	Payyannur Pavithra Ring	Handicraft	Kerala	2010–11
145	27	Phulkari	Handicraft	Punjab, Haryana, Rajasthan	2010–11
146	136	Khandua saree and fabrics	Handicraft	Odisha	2010–11
147	129	Byadagi chilli	Agricultural	Karnataka	2010–11
150	183	Bagru Hand Block Print	Handicraft	Rajasthan	2011–12
151	189	Venkatagiri Sarees	Handicraft	Andhra Pradesh	2011–12
152	185	Gir Kesar Mango	Agricultural	Gujarat	2011–12
153	192	Bhalia Wheat	Agricultural	Gujarat	2011–12
154	201	Villianur Terracotta Works	Handicraft	Pondicherry	2011–12
155	202	Tirukanur Papier Mache Craft	Handicraft	Pondicherry	2011–12
156	174	Kachchh Shawls	Handicraft	Gujarat	2011–12
157	199	Udupi Mattu Gulla Brinjal	Agricultural	Karnataka	2011–12
158	173	Baluchari Saree	Handicraft	West Bengal	2011–12
159	176	Dhaniakhali Saree	Handicraft	West Bengal	2011–12
160	181	Kashmir paper machie	Handicraft	Jammu and Kashmir	2011–12
161	182	Kashmir Walnut Wood Carving	Handicraft	Jammu and Kashmir	2011–12
162	203	Bobbili Veena	Handicraft	Andhra Pradesh	2011–12
163	204	Khatamband	Handicraft	Jammu and Kashmir	2011–12
164	213	Kinhal toys	Handicraft	Karnataka	2011–12
165	225	Chendamangalam Dhoties and Set Mundu	Handicraft	Kerala	2011–12
166	226	Porto	Manufactured	Portugal	2011–12
167	227	Douro	Manufactured	Portugal	2011–12
168	167	Gopalpur Tussar Fabrics	Handicraft	Odisha	2011–12
169	188	Siddipet Gollabama	Handicraft	Telangana	2011–12
170	228	Ganjam Kewda Rooh	Manufactured	Odisha	2011–12
171	229	Ganjam Kewda Flower	Agricultural	Odisha	2011–12
172	197	Maheshwari Saree and fabrics	Handicraft	Madhya Pradesh	2012–13
173	207	Dhalapathar Parda & Fabrics	Handicraft	Odisha	2012–13
174	208	Sambalpuri bandha saree and fabrics	Handicraft	Odisha	2012–13
175	217	Bomkai saree and fabrics	Handicraft	Odisha	2012–13
176	219	Habaspuri saree and fabrics	Handicraft	Odisha	2012–13
177	220	Berhampur Patta (phoda kumbha) saree and joda	Handicraft	Odisha	2012–13
178	180	Bhagalpur silk	Handicraft	Bihar	2012–13
179	198	Mangalagiri sarees and fabrics	Handicraft	Andhra Pradesh	2012–13
180	238	Madurai Malli	Agricultural	Tamil Nadu	2012–13
182	195	Pattamadai Mat	Handicraft	Tamil Nadu	2012–13
183	196	Nachiarkoil kuthuvilakku	Handicraft	Tamil Nadu	2012–13
184	200	Chettinad Kottan	Handicraft	Tamil Nadu	2012–13
185	214	Narayanpet handloom sarees	Handicraft	Telangana	2012–13
186	135	Toda Embroidery	Handicraft	Tamil Nadu	2012–13
187	209	Thanjavur Veenai	Handicraft	Tamil Nadu	2012–13
188	211	Bangalore Blue Grapes	Agricultural	Karnataka	2012–13
189	233	Agra Durrie	Handicraft	Uttar Pradesh	2012–13
190	234	Farrukhabad Prints	Handicraft	Uttar Pradesh	2012–13
191	236	Lucknow Zardozi	Handicraft	Uttar Pradesh	2012–13
192	237	Banaras brocades and sarees (logo)	Handicraft	Uttar Pradesh	2012–13
193	205	Kalanamak Rice	Agricultural	Uttar Pradesh	2013–14
194	232	Patan patola	Handicraft	Gujarat	2013–14
195	386	Orissa Pattachitra (Logo)	Handicraft	Odisha	2013–14
196	387	Bastar Dhokra (Logo)	Handicraft	Chhattisgarh	2013–14
197	388	Bell Metal Ware of Datia and Tikamgarh (Logo)	Handicraft	Madhya Pradesh	2013–14
198	242	Kaipad Rice	Agricultural	Kerala	2013–14
199	383	Kullu Shawl (Logo)	Handicraft	Himachal Pradesh	2013–14
200	384	Muga Silk of Assam (Logo)	Handicraft	Assam	2013–14
202	155	Firozabad Glass	Handicraft	Uttar Pradesh	2013–14
203	157	Kannauj Perfume	Manufactured	Uttar Pradesh	2013–14
204	159	Kanpur Saddlery	Handicraft	Uttar Pradesh	2013–14
205	161	Moradabad Metal Craft	Handicraft	Uttar Pradesh	2013–14
206	184	Saharanpur Wood Craft	Handicraft	Uttar Pradesh	2013–14
207	215	Dharmavaram handloom pattu sarees and paavadas	Handicraft	Andhra Pradesh	2013–14
208	239	Warli Painting	Handicraft	Maharashtra, Gujarat	2013–14
209	240	Kolhapur Jaggery	Agricultural	Maharashtra	2013–14
210	244	Thewa Art Work	Handicraft	Rajasthan	2013–14
211	371	Shaphee Lanphee	Handicraft	Manipur	2013–14
212	372	Wangkhei Phee	Handicraft	Manipur	2013–14
213	373	Moirang Phee	Handicraft	Manipur	2013–14
214	381 & 413	Kangra Paintings	Handicraft	Himachal Pradesh	2013–14
215	385	Nagpur Orange	Agricultural	Maharashtra, Madhya Pradesh	2013–14
216	399	Leather Toys of Indore (Logo)	Handicraft	Madhya Pradesh	2014–15
217	212	Bangalore Rose Onion	Agricultural	Karnataka	2014–15
218	389	Meerut Scissors	Manufactured	Uttar Pradesh	2014–15
219	178	Khurja Pottery	Handicraft	Uttar Pradesh	2014–15
220	374	Naga Tree Tomato	Agricultural	Nagaland	2014–15
221	375	Arunachal Orange	Agricultural	Arunachal Pradesh	2014–15
222	376	Sikkim Large Cardamom	Agricultural	Sikkim	2014–15
223	377	Mizo Chilli	Agricultural	Mizoram	2014–15
224	382	Joynagar Moa	Food stuff	West Bengal	2014–15
225	397	Banaras Gulabi Meenakari Craft	Handicraft	Uttar Pradesh	2014–15
226	435	Assam Karbi Anglong Ginger	Agricultural	Assam	2014–15
227	436	Tripura Queen Pineapple	Agricultural	Tripura	2014–15
228	479	Chengalikodan Nendran Banana	Agricultural	Kerala	2014–15
229	434	Ratlami Sev	Food stuff	Madhya Pradesh	2014–15
230	438	Tezpur Litchi	Agricultural	Assam	2014–15
231	465	Khasi Mandarin	Agricultural	Meghalaya	2014–15
232	466	Kachai Lemon	Agricultural	Manipur	2014–15
233	405	Makrana Marble	Natural Goods	Rajasthan	2014–15
234	457	Varanasi Wooden Lacquerware and Toys	Handicraft	Uttar Pradesh	2014–15
235	458	Mirzapur Handmade Dari	Handicraft	Uttar Pradesh	2014–2015
236	437	Memong Narang	Agricultural	Meghalaya	2015–16
237	459	Nizamabad Black Pottery	Handicrafts	Uttar Pradesh	2015–16
238	145	Basmati	Agricultural	Punjab, Haryana, Himachal Pradesh, Delhi, Uttarkhand, Uttar Pradesh, Jammu and Kashmir	2015–16
239	505	Bagh Prints of Madhya Pradesh (Logo)	Handicrafts	Madhya Pradesh	2015–16
240	507	Sankheda Furniture (Logo)	Handicrafts	Gujarat	2015–16
241	509	Kutch Embroidery (Logo)	Handicrafts	Gujarat	2015–16
242	510	Karnataka Bronzeware (Logo)	Handicrafts	Karnataka	2015–16
243	511	Ganjifa Cards of Mysore (Logo)	Handicrafts	Karnataka	2015–16
244	512	Navalgund Durries (Logo)	Handicrafts	Karnataka	2015–16
245	513	Thanjavur Art Plate (Logo)	Handicrafts	Tamil Nadu	2015–16
246	514	Swamimalai Bronze Icons (Logo)	Handicrafts	Tamil Nadu	2015–16
247	515	Temple Jewellery of Nagercoil (Logo)	Handicrafts	Tamil Nadu	2015–16
248	470	Ajara Ghansal Rice	Agricultural	Maharashtra	2015–16
249	472	Mangalwedha Jowar	Agricultural	Maharashtra	2015–16
250	474	Sindhudurg and Ratnagiri Kokum	Agricultural	Maharashtra	2015–16
251	508	Agates of Cambay (Logo)	Handicrafts	Gujarat	2015–16
252	210	Guledgudd Khana	Handicrafts	Karnataka	2015–16
253	224	Udupi sarees	Handicrafts	Karnataka	2015–16
254	402	Kuthampally Dhoties and Set Mundu	Handicrafts	Kerala	2015–16
255	476	Waghya Ghevada	Agricultural	Maharashtra	2015–16
256	477	Navapur Tur Dal	Agricultural	Maharashtra	2015–16
257	489	Vengurla Cashew	Agricultural	Maharashtra	2015–16
258	491	Lasalgaon Onion	Agricultural	Maharashtra	2015–16
259	516	Maddalam of Palakkad (Logo)	Handicrafts	Kerala	2015–16
260	517	Brass Broidered Coconut Shell Craft of Kerala (Logo)	Handicrafts	Kerala	2015–16
261	518	Screw Pine Craft of Kerala (Logo)	Handicrafts	Kerala	2015–16
262	490	Sangli Raisins	Agricultural	Maharashtra	2016–17
264	398	Banaras Metal Repouse Craft	Handicrafts	Uttar Pradesh	2016–17
265	494	Beed Custard Apple	Agricultural	Maharashtra	2016–17
266	495	Jalna Sweet Orange	Agricultural	Maharashtra	2016–17
267	520	Uttarakhand Tejpat	Agricultural	Uttarakhand	2016–17
268	471	Waigaon Turmeric	Agricultural	Maharashtra	2016–17
269	500	Purandar Fig	Agricultural	Maharashtra	2016–17
270	501	Jalgaon Bharit Brinjal	Agricultural	Maharashtra	2016–17
271	502	Solapur Pomegranate	Agricultural	Maharashtra	2016–17
272	527	Kashmiri Hand Knotted Carpet	Handicrafts	Jammu and Kashmir	2016–17
273	221	Jamnagari Bandhani	Handicrafts	Gujarat	2016–17
275	532	Mysore Silk (Logo)	Handicrafts	Karnataka	2016–17
276	177	Varanasi Glass beads	Handicrafts	Uttar Pradesh	2016–17
278	473	Bhiwapur Chilli	Agricultural	Maharashtra	2016–17
279	478	Ambemohar Rice	Agricultural	Maharashtra	2016–17
280	493	Dahanu Gholvad Chikoo	Agricultural	Maharashtra	2016–17
281	498	Jalgaon Banana	Agricultural	Maharashtra	2016–17
282	499	Marathwada Kesar Mango	Agricultural	Maharashtra	2016–17
283	390	Karvath Kati sarees and fabrics	Handicrafts	Maharashtra	2016–17
284	537	Applique (Khatwa) Work of Bihar (Logo)	Handicrafts	Bihar	2016–17
285	539	Molela Clay Work of Rajasthan (Logo)	Handicrafts	Rajasthan	2016–17
286	433	Bandar Laddu	Food stuff	Andhra Pradesh	2016–17
287	439	Joha rice of Assam	Agricultural	Assam	2016–17
288	522	Udayagiri Wooden Cutlery	Handicrafts	Andhra Pradesh	2016–17
289	525	Bardhaman Sitabhog	Food stuff	West Bengal	2016–17
290	526	Bardhaman Mihidana	Food stuff	West Bengal	2016–17
291	536	Sikki Grass Products of Bihar (Logo)	Handicrafts	Bihar	2016–17
292	538	Sujini Embroidery Work of Bihar (Logo)	Handicrafts	Bihar	2016–17
293	540	Blue Pottery of Jaipur (Logo)	Handicrafts	Rajasthan	2016–17
294	541	Kathputlis of Rajasthan (Logo)	Handicrafts	Rajasthan	2016–17
295	241	Banaganapalle Mangoes	Agricultural	Telangana, Andhra Pradesh	2017–18
296	562	Pochampally Ikat (Logo)	Handicrafts	Telangana	2017–18
297	531	Gobindobhog Rice	Agricultural	West Bengal	2017–18
298	481	Durgi Stone Carvings	Handicrafts	Andhra Pradesh	2017–18
299	482	Etikoppaka Toys	Handicrafts	Andhra Pradesh	2017–18
300	530	Tulaipanji Rice	Agricultural	West Bengal	2017–18
301	542	Chakshesang Shawl	Handicrafts	Nagaland	2017–18
302	426	Mahabalipuram Stone Sculpture	Handicrafts	Tamil Nadu	2017–18
303	533	Banglar Rasogolla	Food stuff	West Bengal	2017–18
305	543	Nilambur Teak	Agricultural	Kerala	2017–18
306	453	Bankura Panchmura Terracotta Craft	Handicraft	West Bengal	2017–18
307	519	Pokaran Pottery	Handicraft	Rajasthan	2017–18
308	521	Adilabad Dokra	Handicraft	Telangana	2017–18
309	523	Warangal Durries	Handicraft	Telangana	2017–18
310	524	Allagadda Stone Carving	Handicraft	Andhra Pradesh	2017–18
311	551	Bhagalpuri Zardalu	Agricultural	Bihar	2017–18
312	553	Katarni Rice	Agricultural	Bihar	2017–18
313	554	Magahi Paan	Agricultural	Bihar	2017–18
314	555	Ghazipur Wall-hanging	Handicraft	Uttar Pradesh	2017–18
315	556	Varanasi Soft Stone Jali Work	Handicraft	Uttar Pradesh	2017–18
316	563	Bengal Dokra	Handicraft	West Bengal	2017–18
317	564	Bengal Patachitra	Handicraft	West Bengal	2017–18
318	565	Purulia Chau Mask	Handicraft	West Bengal	2017–18
319	566	Wooden Mask of Kushmandi	Handicraft	West Bengal	2017–18
320	567	Madur kathi	Handicraft	West Bengal	2017–18
321	378	Jhabua Kadaknath Black Chicken Meat	Food stuff	Madhya Pradesh	2018–19
322	558	Boka Chaul	Agricultural	Assam	2018–19
324	139	Alphonso mango	Agricultural	Maharashtra	2018–19
325	380	RajKot Patola	Handicraft	Gujarat	2018–19
326	552	Shahi Litchi of Bihar	Agricultural	Bihar	2018–19
327	496	Sangli Turmeric	Agricultural	Maharashtra	2018–19
328	585	Pethapur Printing Blocks	Handicraft	Gujarat	2018–19
329	169	Kolhapuri Chappal	Handicraft	Maharashtra, Karnataka	2018–19
330	584	Silao Khaja	Food stuff	Bihar	2018–19
331	604	Coorg Arabica Coffee	Agricultural	Karnataka	2018–19
332	605	Wayanaad Robusta Coffee	Agricultural	Kerala	2018–19
333	606	Chikmagalur Arabica Coffee	Agricultural	Karnataka	2018–19
334	607	Araku Valley Arabica Coffee	Agricultural	Andhra Pradesh, Odisha	2018–19
335	608	Bababudangiri Arabica Coffee	Agricultural	Karnataka	2018–19
336	432	Himachali Kala Zeera	Agricultural	Himachal Pradesh	2018–19
337	464	Sirsi Supari	Agricultural	Karnataka	2018–19
338	468	Himachali Chulli Oil	Manufactured	Himachal Pradesh	2018–19
339	557	Chunar Balua Patthar	Natural	Uttar Pradesh	2018–19
340	231	Erode Manjal	Agricultural	Tamil Nadu	2018–19
341	613	Marayoor Jaggery	Agricultural	Kerala	2018–19
342	480	Thirubuvanam silk sarees	Handicraft	Tamil Nadu	2018–19
343	611	Jeeraphool	Agricultural	Chhattisgarh	2018–19
344	610	Kandhamal Haladi	Agricultural	Odisha	2019–20
345	612	Odisha Rasagola	Food stuff	Odisha	2019–20
346	616	Kodaikanal Malai Poondu	Agricultural	Tamil Nadu	2019–20
347	586	Pawndum	Handicraft	Mizoram	2019–20
348	587	Ngotekherh	Handicraft	Mizoram	2019–20
349	588	Hmaram	Handicraft	Mizoram	2019–20
350	550	Palani Panchamirtham	Food stuff	Tamil Nadu	2019–20
351	582	Tawlhlohpuan	Handicraft	Mizoram	2019–20
352	583	Mizo Puanchei	Handicraft	Mizoram	2019–20
353	593	Gulbarga Tur Dal	Agricultural	Karnataka	2019–20
354	641	Tirur Betel Leaf	Agricultural	Kerala	2019–20
356	618	Khola Chilli	Agricultural	Goa	2019–20
357	625	Idu Mishmi Textiles	Handicraft	Arunachal Pradesh	2019–20
358	400	Dindigul Locks	Handicraft	Tamil Nadu	2019–20
359	422	Kandangi saree	Handicraft	Tamil Nadu	2019–20
360	403	Srivilliputtur Palkova	Food stuff	Tamil Nadu	2019–20
361	609	Kaji Nemu	Agricultural	Assam	2019–20
362	572	Chokuwa rice of Assam	Agricultural	Assam	2019–20
363	486	Kovilpatti Kadalai Mittai	Food stuff	Tamil Nadu	2019–20
364	602	Chak-Hao	Agricultural	Manipur, Nagaland	2019–20
365	619	Gorakhpur Terracotta	Handicraft	Uttar Pradesh	2019–20
366	635	Kashmir Saffron	Agricultural	Jammu and Kashmir	2020–21
367	423	Thanjavur Netti Works	Handicraft	Tamil Nadu	2020–21
368	429	Arumbavur Wood Carvings	Handicraft	Tamil Nadu	2020–21
369	599	Telia Rumal	Handicraft	Telangana	2020–21
370	658	Sohrai – Khovar Painting	Handicraft	Jharkhand	2020–21
371	621	Chunar Glaze Pottery	Handicraft	Uttar Pradesh	2021–22
372	628	Sojat Mehndi	Agricultural	Rajasthan	2021–22
373	424	Karuppur Kalamkari Paintings	Handicraft	Tamil Nadu	2021–22
374	431	Kallakurichi Wood Carving	Handicraft	Tamil Nadu	2021–22
375	589	Bhotia Dann of Uttarakhand	Handicraft	Uttarakhand	2021–22
376	424	Judima	Manufactured	Assam	2021–22
382	663	Balaghat Chinnor	Agricultural	Madhya Pradesh	2021–22
383	660	Kuttiattoor Mango	Agricultural	Kerala	2021–22
385	644	Pithora	Handicraft	Gujarat	2021–22
386	656	Manjusha Art	Handicraft	Bihar	2021–22
387	642	Harmal Chilli	Agricultural	Goa	2021–22
388	662	Edayur Chilli	Agricultural	Kerala	2021–22
389	648	Uttarakhand Aipan	Handicraft	Uttarakhand	2021–22
390	651	Munsyari Razma	Agricultural	Uttarakhand	2021–22
391	652	Uttarakhand Ringal Craft	Handicraft	Uttarakhand	2021–22
392	653	Uttarakhand Tamta Product	Handicraft	Uttarakhand	2021–22
393	654	Uttarakhand Thulma	Handicraft	Uttarakhand	2021–22
394	680	Myndoli Banana	Agricultural	Goa	2021–22
395	620	Banaras Zardozi	Handicraft	Uttar Pradesh	2021–22
396	622	Mirzapur Pital Bartan	Handicraft	Uttar Pradesh	2021–22
397	623	Banaras Wood Carving	Handicraft	Uttar Pradesh	2021–22
398	624	Banaras Hand Block Print	Handicraft	Uttar Pradesh	2021–22
399	650	Kumaon Chyura Oil	Agricultural	Uttarakhand	2021–22
400	655	Goan Khaje	Food stuff	Goa	2021–22
401	206	Rataul Mango	Agricultural	Uttar Pradesh	2021–22
402	590	Tamenglong Orange	Agricultural	Manipur	2021–22
403	614	Chamba Chappal	Handicraft	Himachal Pradesh	2021–22
404	645	Mau saree	Handicraft	Uttar Pradesh	2021–22
405	647	Lahauli Knitted Socks and Gloves	Handicraft	Himachal Pradesh	2021–22
406	675	Kanniyakumari Clove	Agricultural	Tamil Nadu	2021–22
407	592	Sirarakhong Hathei chilli	Agricultural	Manipur	2021–22
408	640	Naga Cucumber	Agricultural	Nagaland	2021–22
410	253	Münchener Bier	Manufactured	Germany	2021–22
411	401	Mahoba Desawari Pan	Agricultural	Uttar Pradesh, Madhya Pradesh	2021–22
413	629 & 630	Mizo Ginger	Agricultural	Mizoram	2021–22
414	636	Dalle Khursani	Agricultural	Sikkim, West Bengal	2021–22
420	467	Narasinghapettai Nagaswaram	Handicraft	Tamil Nadu	2021–22
421	696	Mithila Makhana	Agricultural	Bihar	2022–23
424	685	Alibag White Onion	Agricultural	Maharashtra	2022–23
425	686	Attappady Aattukombu Avara	Agricultural	Kerala	2022–23
426	687	Attappady Thuvara	Agricultural	Kerala	2022–23
427	736	Onattukara Ellu	Agricultural	Kerala	2022–23
428	749	Kanthalloor Vattavada Veluthulli	Agricultural	Kerala	2022–23
429	752	Kodungallur Pottuvellari	Agricultural	Kerala	2022–23
430	706	Tandur Redgram	Agricultural	Telangana	2022–23
431	729	Ladakh Raktsey Karpo Apricot	Agricultural	Ladakh	2022–23
432	594	Gamosa of Assam	Handicraft	Assam	2022–23
435	669	Nagri Dubraj	Agricultural	Chhattisgarh	2022–23
436	681	Morena Gajak	Food stuff	Madhya Pradesh	2022–23
437	707	Rewa Sunderja Mango	Agricultural	Madhya Pradesh	2022–23
438	699	Sharbati Gehu	Agricultural	Madhya Pradesh	2022–23
439	701	Gond Painting of Madhya Pradesh	Handicraft	Madhya Pradesh	2022–23
440	715	Adamchini Chawal	Agricultural	Uttar Pradesh	2022–23
441	720	Ramnathapuram Mundu Chilli	Agricultural	Tamil Nadu	2022–23
442	788	Vellore Spiny Brinjal	Agricultural	Tamil Nadu	2022–23
443	428	Myladi Stone Carvings	Handicraft	Tamil Nadu	2022–23
444	488	Manapparai Murukku	Food stuff	Tamil Nadu	2022–23
445	529	Ooty Varkey	Food stuff	Tamil Nadu	2022–23
446	561	Manamadurai Pottery	Handicraft	Tamil Nadu	2022–23
447	574	Thaikkal Rattan Craft	Handicraft	Tamil Nadu	2022–23
448	664	Aligarh Tala	Handicraft	Uttar Pradesh	2022–23
449	665	Bakhira Brassware	Handicraft	Uttar Pradesh	2022–23
450	666	Banda Shazar Patthar craft	Handicraft	Uttar Pradesh	2022–23
451	667	Nagina Wood Craft	Handicraft	Uttar Pradesh	2022–23
452	668	Pratapgarh Aonla	Agricultural	Uttar Pradesh	2022–23
453	672	Hathras Hing	Food stuff	Uttar Pradesh	2022–23
455	694	Mata ni Pachhedi	Handicraft	Gujarat	2022–23
456	697	Wrought Iron Crafts of Dindori	Handicraft	Madhya Pradesh	2022–23
457	700	Ujjain Batik Print	Handicraft	Madhya Pradesh	2022–23
458	708	Gwalior Handmade Carpet	Handicraft	Madhya Pradesh	2022–23
459	709	Waraseoni handloom saree and fabrics	Handicraft	Madhya Pradesh	2022–23
460	710	Jabalpur Stone Craft	Handicraft	Madhya Pradesh	2022–23
461	711	Salem Sago	Food stuff	Tamil Nadu	2022–23
462	716	Banaras Langda Aam	Agricultural	Uttar Pradesh	2022–23
463	717	Ramnagar Bhanta	Agricultural	Uttar Pradesh	2022–23
464	719	Authoor Vetrilai	Agricultural	Tamil Nadu	2022–23
465	723	Muzaffarnagar Gur	Food stuff	Uttar Pradesh	2022–23
466	726	Pashmina Wool of Ladakh	Handicraft	Ladakh	2022–23
467	730	Banaras Pan (Betel Leaf)	Agricultural	Uttar Pradesh	2022–23
468	734	Cumbum Panneer Thratchai	Agricultural	Tamil Nadu	2022–23
469	745	Indi Limbe	Agricultural	Karnataka	2022–23
470	755	Basohli Painting	Handicraft	Jammu and Kashmir	2022–23
471	766	Negamam cotton saree	Handicraft	Tamil Nadu	2022–23
472	771	Ladakh Shingskos	Handicraft	Ladakh	2022–23
473	789	Sholavandan Vetrilai	Agricultural	Tamil Nadu	2022–23
474	800	Marthandam Honey	Food stuff	Tamil Nadu	2022–23
475	843	Kari Ishad Mango	Agricultural	Karnataka	2022–23
476	671	Mahoba Gaura Patthar Hastashlip	Handicraft	Uttar Pradesh	2023–24
477	673	Mainpuri Tarkashi	Handicraft	Uttar Pradesh	2023–24
478	674	Sambhal Horn Craft	Handicraft	Uttar Pradesh	2023–24
479	670	Amroha Dholak	Handicraft	Uttar Pradesh	2023–24
480	731	Baghpat Home Furnishings	Handicraft	Uttar Pradesh	2023–24
481	732	Barabanki Handloom Product	Handicraft	Uttar Pradesh	2023–24
482	733	Kalpi Handmade Paper	Handicraft	Uttar Pradesh	2023–24
483	804	Atreyapuram Pootharekulu	Food stuff	Andhra Pradesh	2023–24
484	727	Ladakh Seabuckthorn	Agricultural	Ladakh	2023–24
485	688	Bhandara Chinoor Rice	Agricultural	Maharashtra	2023–24
486	698	Jaderi Namakatti	Handicraft	Tamil Nadu	2023–24
487	721	Agra Leather Footwear	Manufactured	Uttar Pradesh	2023–24
488	748	Nathdwara Pichhwai Painting	Handicraft	Rajasthan	2023–24
489	757	Kanyakumari Matti Banana	Agricultural	Tamil Nadu	2023–24
490	758	Mushqbudji Rice	Agricultural	Jammu and Kashmir	2023–24
491	762	Chedibutta saree	Handicraft	Tamil Nadu	2023–24
492	763	Agsechi Vayingim (Agassaim Brinjal)	Agricultural	Goa	2023–24
493	765	Rajouri Chikri Wood Craft	Handicraft	Jammu and Kashmir	2023–24
494	790	Sat Shiro Bheno	Agricultural	Goa	2023–24
495	801	Marcha Rice	Agricultural	Bihar	2023–24
496	722	Jalesar Dhatu Shilp	Handicraft	Uttar Pradesh	2023–24
497	728	Goa Mankurad Mango	Agricultural	Goa	2023–24
498	746	Goan Bebinca	Food stuff	Goa	2023–24
499	747	Udaipur Koftgari Metal Craft	Handicraft	Rajasthan	2023–24
500	750	Bikaner Kashidakari Craft	Handicraft	Rajasthan	2023–24
501	751	Jodhpur Bandhej Craft	Handicraft	Rajasthan	2023–24
502	753	Bikaner Usta Kala Craft	Handicraft	Rajasthan	2023–24
503	768	Bhaderwah Rajmash	Agricultural	Jammu and Kashmir	2023–24
504	772	Ramban Sulai Honey	Food stuff	Jammu and Kashmir	2023–24
505	691	Udangudi Panangkarupatti	Food stuff	Tamil Nadu	2023–24
506	714	Goa Cashew (Kaju or Caju)	Agricultural	Goa	2023–24
507	775	Basohli Pashmina Woolen Products	Handicraft	Jammu and Kashmir	2023–24
508	802	Kendrapara Rasabali	Food stuff	Odisha	2023–24
509	803	Arunachal Pradesh Khaw Tai	Agricultural	Arunachal Pradesh	2023–24
510	807	Udhampur Kaladi	Food stuff	Jammu and Kashmir	2023–24
511	809	Arunachal Pradesh Yak Churpi	Food stuff	Arunachal Pradesh	2023–24
512	810	Arunachal Pradesh Tangsa Textile Product	Handicraft	Arunachal Pradesh	2023–24
513	829	Uttarakhand Berinag Tea	Agricultural	Uttarakhand	2023–24
514	832	Uttarakhand Bichhu Buti Fabrics	Handicraft	Uttarakhand	2023–24
515	835	Uttarakhand Mandua	Agricultural	Uttarakhand	2023–24
516	841	Uttarakhand Jhangora	Agricultural	Uttarakhand	2023–24
517	844	Uttarakhand Gahat	Agricultural	Uttarakhand	2023–24
518	852	Uttarakhand Lal Chawal	Agricultural	Uttarakhand	2023–24
519	856	Uttarakhand Kala Bhat	Agricultural	Uttarakhand	2023–24
520	860	Uttarakhand Malta Fruit	Agricultural	Uttarakhand	2023–24
521	863	Uttarakhand Chaulai	Agricultural	Uttarakhand	2023–24
522	864	Almora Lakhori Mirchi	Agricultural	Uttarakhand	2023–24
523	866	Uttarakhand Buransh	Food stuff	Uttarakhand	2023–24
524	867	Uttarakhand Pahari Toor Dal	Agricultural	Uttarakhand	2023–24
525	873	Nainital Mombatti	Manufactured	Uttarakhand	2023–24
526	874	Rangwali Pichhoda of Kumaon	Handicraft	Uttarakhand	2023–24
527	905	Ramnagar Nainital Litchi	Agricultural	Uttarakhand	2023–24
528	907	Ramgarh Nainital Aadu	Agricultural	Uttarakhand	2023–24
529	918	Chamoli Wooden Ramman Mask	Handicraft	Uttarakhand	2023–24
530	919	Uttarakhand Likhai	Handicraft	Uttarakhand	2023–24
531	690	Odisha Khajuri Guda	Food stuff	Odisha	2023–24
532	702	Tangail saree of Bengal	Handicraft	West Bengal	2023–24
533	703	Garad saree	Handicraft	West Bengal	2023–24
534	704	Korial saree	Handicraft	West Bengal	2023–24
535	724	Dhenkanal Magji	Food stuff	Odisha	2023–24
536	725	Similipal Kai Chutney of Odisha	Food stuff	Odisha	2023–24
537	739	Nayagarh Kanteimundi Brinjal	Agricultural	Odisha	2023–24
538	743	Kalonunia Rice	Agricultural	West Bengal	2023–24
539	761	Kachchhi Kharek	Agricultural	Gujarat	2023–24
540	769	Sundarban Honey	Food stuff	West Bengal	2023–24
541	773	Kapadaganda: Dungaria Kondh Embroidery Shawl	Handicraft	Odisha	2023–24
542	774	Ramban Anardana	Agricultural	Jammu and Kashmir	2023–24
543	814	Koraput Kalajeera Rice	Agricultural	Odisha	2023–24
544	848	Arunachal Pradesh Handmade Carpet	Handicraft	Arunachal Pradesh	2023–24
545	849	Arunachal Pradesh Wancho Wooden Craft	Handicraft	Arunachal Pradesh	2023–24
546	855	Arunachal Pradesh Adi Kekir	Agricultural	Arunachal Pradesh	2023–24
547	871	Painting of Lanjia Saura, Odisha	Handicraft	Odisha	2023–24
548	812	Sawantwadi Ganjifa Cards	Handicraft	Maharashtra	2023–24
549	808	Arunachal Pradesh Apatani Textile	Handicraft	Arunachal Pradesh	2023–24
550	811	Arunachal Pradesh Monpa Textile	Handicraft	Arunachal Pradesh	2023–24
551	854	Arunachal Pradesh Nyishi Textile	Handicraft	Arunachal Pradesh	2023–24
552	861	Arunachal Pradesh Monpa Handmade Paper	Handicraft	Arunachal Pradesh	2023–24
553	934	Arunachal Pradesh Adi Textile	Handicraft	Arunachal Pradesh	2023–24
554	935	Arunachal Pradesh Singpho Phalap	Agricultural	Arunachal Pradesh, Assam	2023–24
555	938	Arunachal Pradesh Galo Textile	Handicraft	Arunachal Pradesh	2023–24
556	1004	Arunachal Pradesh Adi Apong	Manufactured	Arunachal Pradesh	2023–24
557	1056	Arunachal Pradesh Dao	Manufactured	Arunachal Pradesh	2023–24
558	1068	Arunachal Pradesh Angnyat Millet	Agricultural	Arunachal Pradesh	2023–24
559	1069	Arunachal Pradesh Marua Apo	Manufactured	Arunachal Pradesh	2023–24
560	1070	Arunachal Pradesh Tai Khamti Textile	Handicraft	Arunachal Pradesh	2023–24
564	676	Banglar Muslin	Handicraft	West Bengal	2023–24
565	713	Narasapur Crochet Lace Products	Handicraft	Andhra Pradesh	2023–24
566	718	Kutch Rogan Craft	Handicraft	Gujarat	2023–24
567	767	Cuttack Rupa Tarakasi	Handicraft	Odisha	2023–24
568	813	Ratlam Riyawan Lahsun	Agricultural	Madhya Pradesh	2023–24
569	893	Tripura Risa Textile	Handicraft	Tripura	2023–24
570	917	Hyderabad Lac Bangles	Handicraft	Telangana	2023–24
571	939	Majuli Mask of Assam	Handicraft	Assam	2023–24
572	940	Assam Majuli Manuscript Painting	Handicraft	Assam	2023–24
573	1114	Ambaji White Marble	Natural	Gujarat	2023–24
574	677	Patchwork of Rampur	Handicraft	Uttar Pradesh	2023–24
575	741	Lakadong Turmeric	Agricultural	Meghalaya	2023–24
576	756	Kutch Bandhani	Handicraft	Gujarat	2023–24
577	785	Vasmat Haldi (Turmeric)	Agricultural	Maharashtra	2023–24
578	786	Nandurbar Amchur	Agricultural	Maharashtra	2023–24
579	787	Nandurbar Mirchi	Agricultural	Maharashtra	2023–24
580	791	Miraj Tanpura	Handicraft	Maharashtra	2023–24
581	792	Hupari Silver Craft	Handicraft	Maharashtra	2023–24
582	793	Miraj Sitar	Handicraft	Maharashtra	2023–24
583	806	Sawantwadi Wooden Craft	Handicraft	Maharashtra	2023–24
584	818	Mathura Sanjhi Craft	Handicraft	Uttar Pradesh	2023–24
585	819	Bundelkhand Kathiya Gehu	Agricultural	Uttar Pradesh, Madhya Pradesh	2023–24
586	822	Banaras Tabla	Handicraft	Uttar Pradesh	2023–24
587	823	Banaras Lal Bharwamirch (Red Pickle Chilli)	Agricultural	Uttar Pradesh	2023–24
588	824	Pilibhit Bansuri	Handicraft	Uttar Pradesh	2023–24
589	825	Panchincholi Tamarind	Agricultural	Maharashtra	2023–24
590	826	Borsuri Tur Dal	Agricultural	Maharashtra	2023–24
591	827	Kasti Coriander	Agricultural	Maharashtra	2023–24
592	833	Chiraigaon Karonda of Varanasi	Agricultural	Uttar Pradesh	2023–24
593	838	Gharchola Craft of Gujarat	Handicraft	Gujarat	2023–24
594	859	Banaras Lal Peda	Food stuff	Uttar Pradesh	2023–24
595	899	Badlapur Jamun	Agricultural	Maharashtra	2023–24
596	924	Banaras Shehnai	Handicraft	Uttar Pradesh	2023–24
597	930	Sambhal Bone Craft	Handicraft	Uttar Pradesh	2023–24
598	933	Moonj Craft of Uttar Pradesh	Handicraft	Uttar Pradesh	2023–24
599	936	Chitrakoot Wooden Craft and Toys	Handicraft	Uttar Pradesh	2023–24
600	947	Bahadoli Jamun	Agricultural	Maharashtra	2023–24
601	949	Pen Ganesh Idol	Handicraft	Maharashtra	2023–24
602	950	Kunthalgiri Khawa	Food stuff	Maharashtra	2023–24
603	952	Kavdi Maal of Tuljapur	Handicraft	Maharashtra	2023–24
604	953	Dagdi Jowar of Jalna	Agricultural	Maharashtra	2023–24
605	959	Bodo Dokhona	Handicraft	Assam	2023–24
606	960	Bodo Eri Silk	Handicraft	Assam	2023–24
607	961	Bodo Jwmgra	Handicraft	Assam	2023–24
608	962	Bodo Gamsa	Handicraft	Assam	2023–24
609	963	Bodo Keradapini	Agricultural	Assam	2023–24
610	965	Bodo Thorkha	Handicraft	Assam	2023–24
611	971	Bodo Gongar Dunjia	Agricultural	Assam	2023–24
612	972	Bodo Kham	Handicraft	Assam	2023–24
613	973	Bodo Serja	Handicraft	Assam	2023–24
614	974	Bodo Sifung	Handicraft	Assam	2023–24
615	975	Bodo Khardwi	Agricultural	Assam	2023–24
616	977	Bodo Gongona	Handicraft	Assam	2023–24
617	978	Bodo Jotha	Handicraft	Assam	2023–24
618	979	Assam Jaapi	Handicraft	Assam	2023–24
619	980	Assam Asharikandi Terracotta Craft	Handicraft	Assam	2023–24
620	997	Gujarat Suf Embroidery	Handicraft	Gujarat	2023–24
621	999	Jaunpur Imarti	Food stuff	Uttar Pradesh	2023–24
622	1000	Banaras Thandai	Food stuff	Uttar Pradesh	2023–24
623	1001	Assam Mishing Handloom Products	Handicraft	Arunachal Pradesh, Assam	2023–24
624	1002	Assam Bihu Dhol	Handicraft	Assam	2023–24
625	1003	Assam Pani Meteka Craft	Handicraft	Assam	2023–24
626	1013	Sarthebari Metal Craft	Handicraft	Assam	2023–24
627	1033	Banaras Mural Painting	Handicraft	Uttar Pradesh	2023–24
628	1063	Ahmedabad Sodagari Block Print	Handicraft	Gujarat	2023–24
629	1064	Surat Sadeli Craft	Handicraft	Gujarat	2023–24
630	1071	Tripura Pachra-Rignai	Handicraft	Tripura	2023–24
631	1072	Tripura Matabari Peda	Food stuff	Tripura	2023–24
632	1090	Bharuch Sujani Weaving	Handicraft	Gujarat	2023–24
633	1094	Meghalaya Garo Textile	Handicraft	Meghalaya	2023–24
634	1095	Meghalaya Lyrnai Pottery	Handicraft	Meghalaya	2023–24
635	1096	Meghalaya Chubitchi	Manufactured	Meghalaya	2023–24
637	820	Pilkhuwa Hand Block Print	Handicraft	Uttar Pradesh	2023–24
638	923	Banaras Metal Casting Craft	Handicraft	Uttar Pradesh	2023–24
639	926	Bareilly Cane and Bamboo	Handicraft	Uttar Pradesh	2023–24
640	928	Tharu Embroidery	Handicraft	Uttar Pradesh	2023–24
641	929	Bareilly Zari Zardoji	Handicraft	Uttar Pradesh	2023–24
642	941	Banaras Tirangi Barfi	Food stuff	Uttar Pradesh	2023–24
643	1050	Kutch Ajrakh	Handicraft	Gujarat	2023–24
644	1055	Andaman Karen Musley rice	Agricultural	Andaman and Nicobar Islands	2023–24
645	1049	Ponduru Khadi	Textiles	Andhra Pradesh	2024-25
646	875	Kolkatti Jewellery	Handi Crafts	West Bengal	2025-26
647	865	Shantiniketan Batik	Textiles	West Bengal	2025-26
