= Santiniketan Leather Goods =

Leather products from a region of India

- Geographical indication
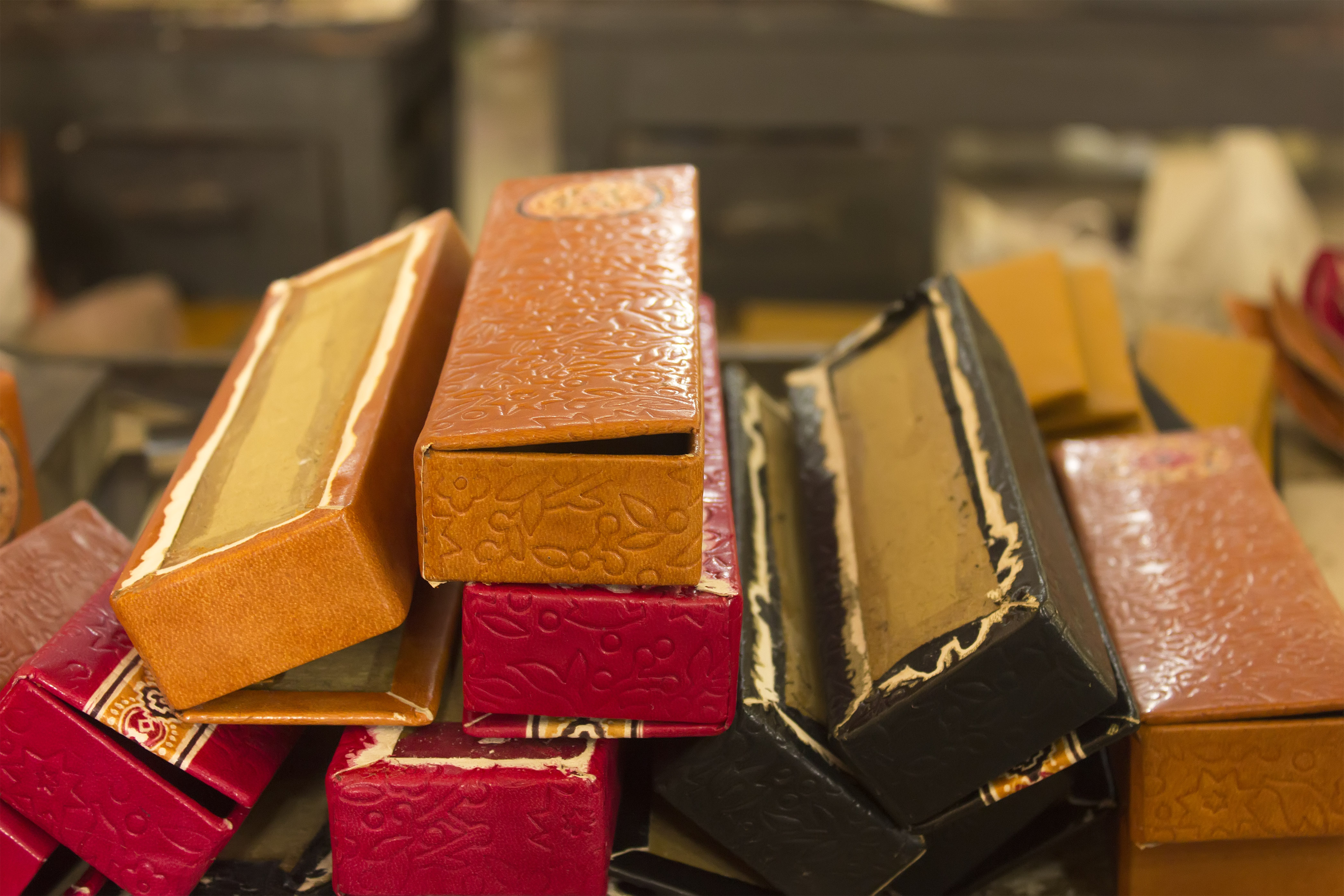
- Boxes made of goat leather
- Alternative names: শান্তিনিকেতনের চর্মজাত সামগ্রী
- Type: Leather art
- Area: Santiniketan and nearby cluster of villages
- Country: India
- Registered: July 2007
- Material: Leather

Santiniketan Leather Goods are leather products made in Santiniketan and surrounding villages near Kolkata, West Bengal, India. The material used is vegetable tanned leather with art work done by touch dyeing. Its artistic leather bags are popular in foreign markets and are exported to many countries including Japan and the U.S. They are generally made of E. I. Leather (East India Leather) from sheepskin and goatskin.

This product has been registered for protection under the List of Geographical indications of the Trade Related Intellectual Property Rights (TRIPS) agreement. In July 2007, it was listed as "Santiniketan Leather Goods" under the GI Act 1999 of the Government of India with registration confirmed by the Controller General of Patents Designs and Trademarks under Class 18 Handicraft goods vide application number 509 dated 12 July 2007.

== History ==
Production was started as a cottage industry about 80 years ago in a few villages surrounding Santiniketan and marketed at the Bhuban Danga Market. The craftsmen of the villages were trained under the Rural Development Programme of Visva-Bharati University at Santiniketan.

== Process of manufacture ==
The vegetable tanned skins used in production have the quality of permanently retaining the embossed imprint of motifs or batiks. A cotton pad or a glass, which has a smooth surface, is used to make the grains of the leather shine.

== Raw materials ==
The raw materials used in making these goods are classified according to the grain quality and smoothness as E.I. Tanned leathers of sheepskin or goatskin that are dyed with vegetable colours. Three leather types are defined: "Paper" which has a coarse grain and spots is the skin of larger goats or sheep, and "Bind" and "Kid" which are both derived from smaller animals and are of superior quality. Other materials used to make the final product include paper board of varying thickness, cotton, velvet or silk for lining, foam rubber for padding, natural dyes and spirit, rubber solution, and assorted sundries.

=== Process ===
The E.I. tanned leathers, which are marketed in rolls with three or four skins, are coated with a preservative of Epsom salt to inhibit oxidation. The skins, after intensive washing, are immersed in a wooden vat or pit. They are then taken out and flattened by pulling and then dried. After drying, designs are drawn on the leather and the leather is cut to the required size to make the desired products.

=== Products ===
The products manufactured and marketed are in the form of coin bags, chappal, handbags, pouches, jewelry boxes, pencil boxes, eyeglass covers, bags, ladies' bags, piggy banks, cushion covers, sandals, wallets, and many more.

== Santiketan leather goods picture gallery ==
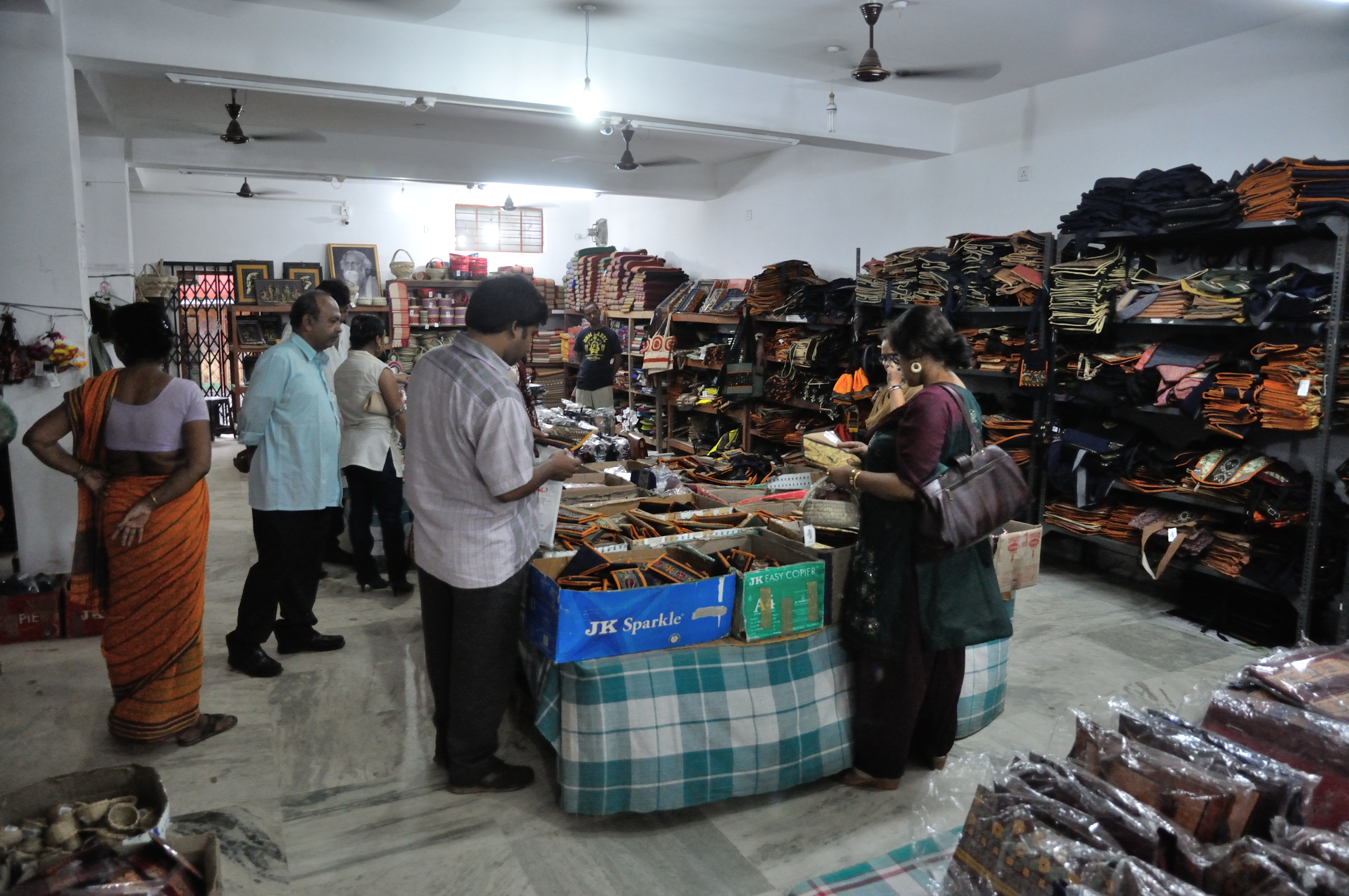
Santiketan leather goods and other handicraft items on sale at Amar Kutir

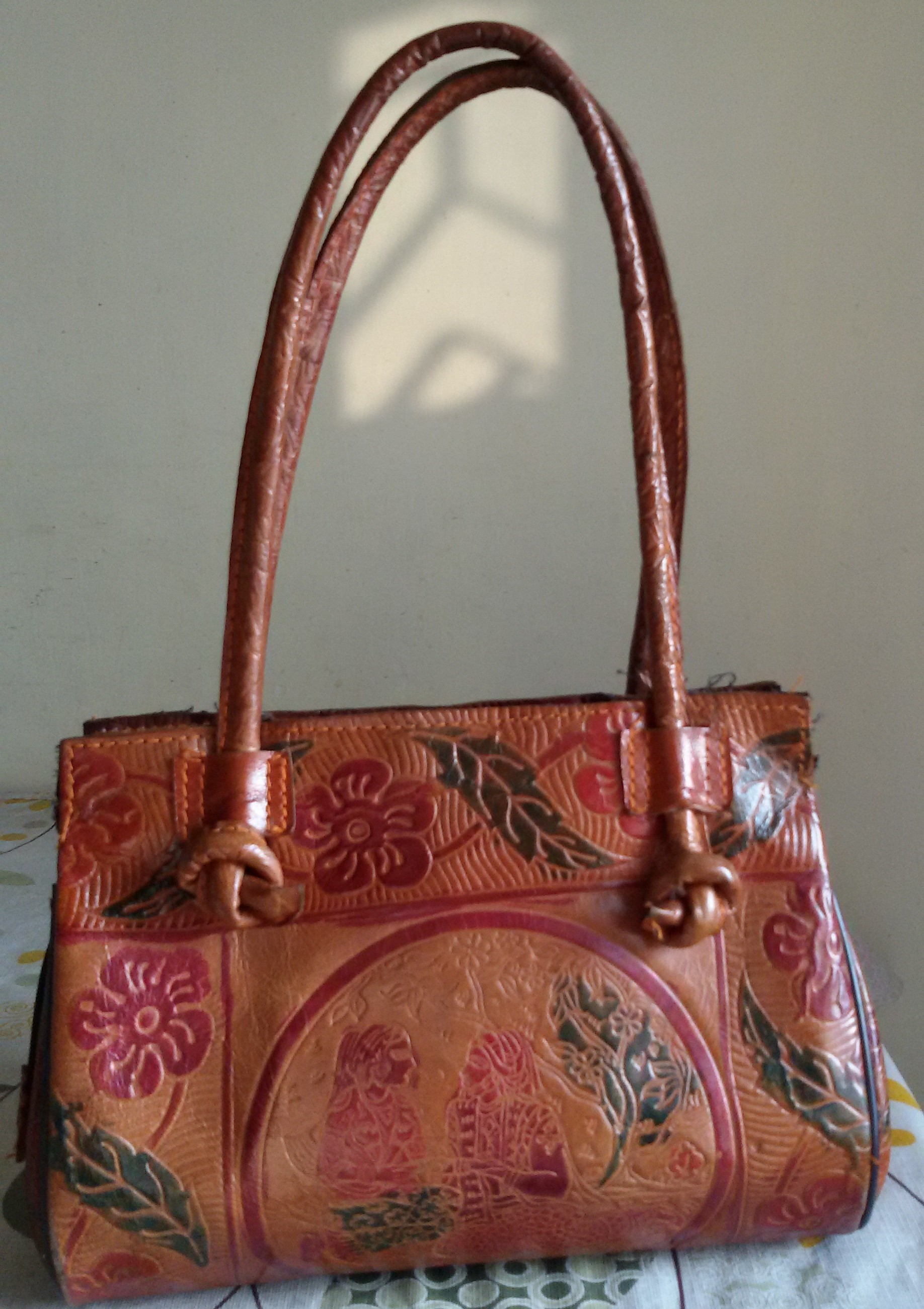
Santiniketan leather bag with batik design
