= Salem silk =

Silk clothes made in Salem region of Tamil Nadu

Salem Silk
- Geographical indication
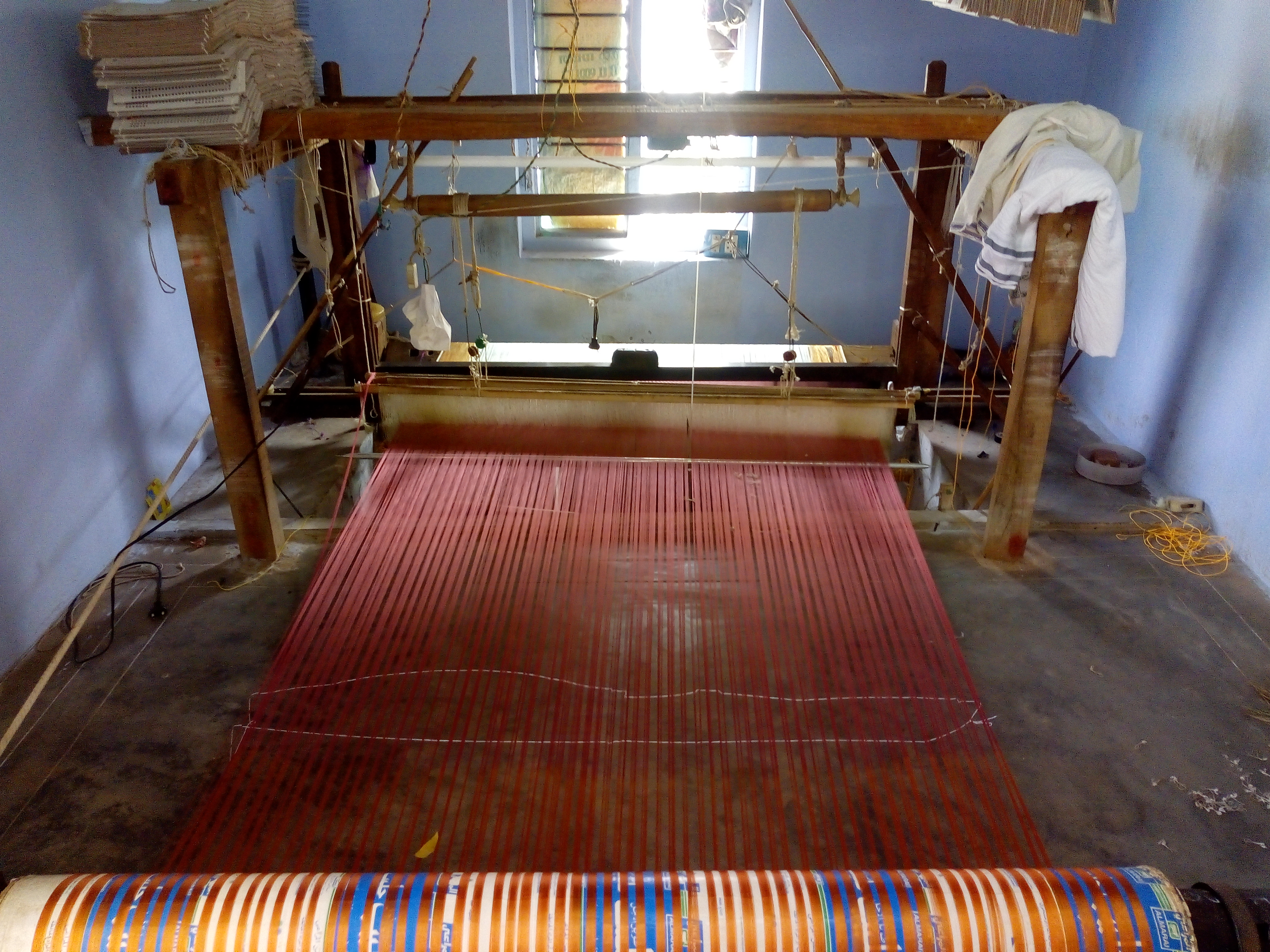
- A traditional silk handloom in Salem
- Description: Silk clothes manufactured in Salem region
- Type: Handicraft
- Area: Salem, Tamil Nadu
- Country: India
- Registered: 2007–08
- Material: silk

Salem Silk or Salem Venpattu refers to silk clothes made in the Salem region in the Indian state of Tamil Nadu. It was declared as a Geographical indication in 2007–08.
