= Arani Silk Sarees =

Traditional sari made in Arani, Tamil Nadu, India

Arani Silk
- Geographical indication
- Description: Silk sarees
- Type: Handicraft
- Area: Arani, Tiruvannamalai, Tamil Nadu
- Country: India
- Registered: 02.05.2008
- Material: Silk

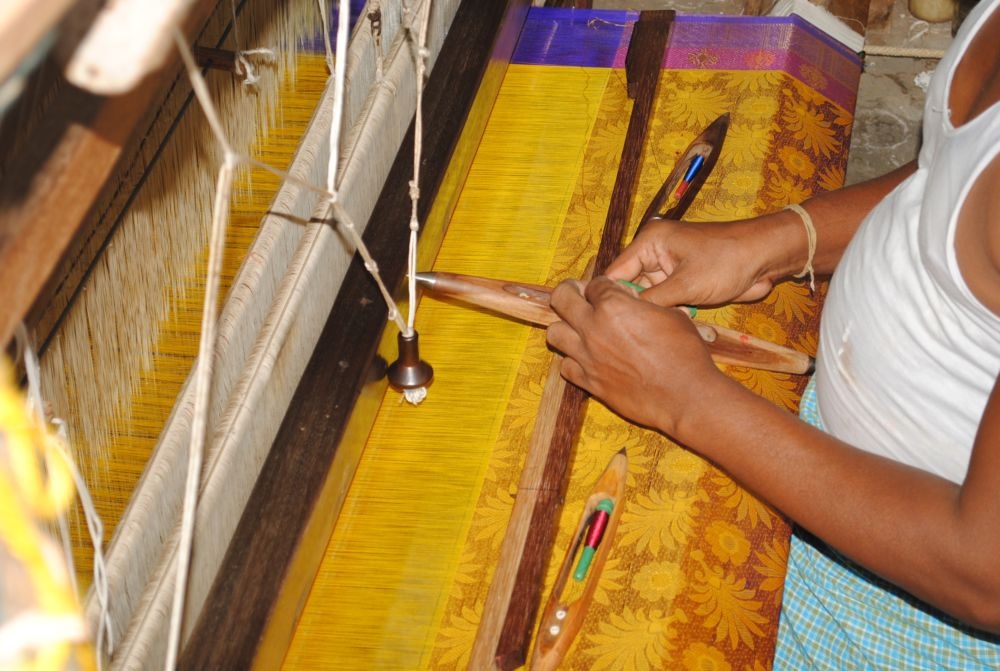
A handloom in Arani

Arani Silk Sarees are traditional silk sarees made in the town of Arani, located in the Indian state of Tamil Nadu. Because these sarees are produced in Arani, the town is often referred to as the Silk City of Arani or Arani Silk City.

A saree is an unstitched cloth usually ranging from four to nine yards in length. The term "sari" is derived from the Sanskrit word "sāḍī", and mentions of sarees can be found in Tamil literature dating back to the 5th and 6th centuries CE. Arani silk sarees are known for their intricate zari (gold thread) work.

Arani Silk Sarees have received a Geographical Indication (GI) tag. After Kanchipuram, Arani is one of the most renowned centers for silk saree production in Tamil Nadu. It is also the town that contributes the highest revenue within its district.

In 2018, Arani Silk Sarees received a national award for excellence in silk production and marketing. The Geographical Indication tag further highlights the unique identity and quality of these sarees.

== History of Arani Silk ==
This traditional industry flourished predominantly in Arani and surrounding regions. Inscriptions found in nearby villages like Vadamanadamangalam and Devikapuram mention the presence of handloom weaving. The silk weaving in Arani began during the Vijayanagara Empire period and continued to grow during the Arani jagir rule and the British era. The first silk weaving unit is believed to have been established by Thambanna Chettiar. The technique of block printing was introduced by Kannaiya Naidu, while dyeing methods using multiple colors were brought in by V. Vijayaraghava Naidu. Over time, the number of weavers and sellers in silk production gradually increased.

=== Arani Handloom Silk Cluster ===
Arani operates one of the largest handloom silk saree clusters in Tamil Nadu, particularly known for using original silver zari threads. More than 35,000 traditional weavers are active in the Arani region.

== See also ==
- List of Geographical Indications in Tamil Nadu

== Geographical indication rights ==
Arani sari received Intellectual Property Rights Protection or Geographical Indication (GI) status.
