= Katarni rice =

Katarni rice is a unique tasting, aromatic, short grain rice grown in India, in the state of Bihar. Grown natively in the Bhagalpur and Banka districts, Katarni rice is not only in demand in Bihar, but throughout the country.

Despite its uniqueness, Katarni rice is facing the threat of extinction. Since 1991–92, there has been significant decrease in the area of Katarni rice cultivation, mainly due to: (i) increased irrigation cost, (ii) higher production of other paddy varieties; (iii) declining demand in local as well as global market due to introduction of adulterated variety in the market. It has recently been tagged with Geographical Indication for certain blocks under Bhagalpur, Banka and Munger districts of Bihar. Due to unique quality characteristics, it has immense export potential.

It has the Geographical Indication tag in India.

Facts about Katarni Rice: Duration(days): 160; Yield (t/ha): 1-1.5; Plant height(cm): 130-175; Grain size: Small; Grain aroma: Strong
