= Kachchh shawl =

Tradition shawl woven in Gujarat

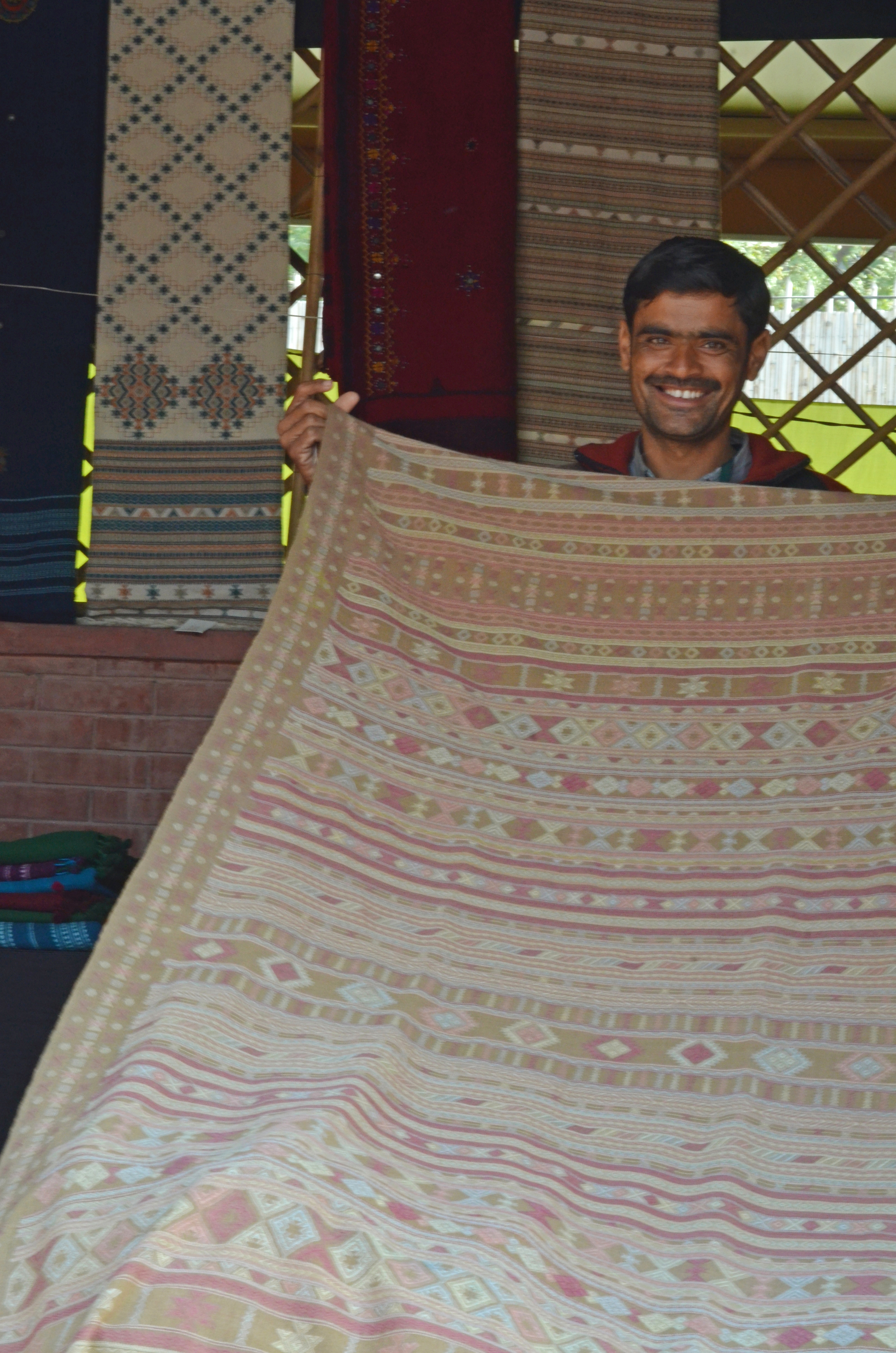
A traditional shawl maker from Kutch, Gujarat

A Kachchh shawl is a traditional shawl woven in the Kutch region of the Gujarat, India. These are largely woven with Kachchhi motifs in Bhujodi, Sarli and some other village of Kutch. Traditionally Kachchhi Vankar (weavers) belong to Marwada and Maheswari communities. In its traditional form, the dhabla (a Kachchh shawl, known in the Kutchi language) was a multi-purpose woolen textile used by the Rabari pastoralists of Kutch. Woven in a dense and compact structure, it functioned as protection against rain during the monsoon and as insulation against cold desert winds at night. Due to the narrow width of early looms, a dhabla was typically woven in two separate panels and later joined at the center using a decorative seam known as machi-kandha or khelavni (fish stitch).

The production of the dhabla was historically linked to a regional barter system involving the Rabari herders, the Vankar weavers, and Rabari women dyers. The Rabaris supplied raw fleece from indigenous sheep and goats, while the Vankars processed, spun, and wove the wool. In exchange, the weavers received dairy products, grains, and other goods, sustaining a localized, interdependent craft economy in the Kutch region.

Kachchhi shawls have received geographical indication tag under the Geographical Indications of Goods (Registration and Protection) Act, 1999.

== Origin ==
There are two stories about the migration of weavers into the Kutch region around 500 years ago. According to the first story a girl belonging to a rich Rabari family was married to a man in Kutch and she was given a weaver in dowry. This family of weavers grew into a large community in the following years. The second story is related to Ramdev Pir who came to Kutch from Rajasthan. Soon enough some of his followers built a temple in his praise and asked him to bring some of his kin from Marwar, Rajasthan to take care of the temple. This led to the settlement of the Meghwal community of weavers in Kutch.

== Types of shawls ==
1. Embroidered Shawl
2. Tie Dyed Shawl
3. Acrylic Shawl
4. Desi wool shawl
