= Malda Fazli Mango =

Mango cultivar from West Bengal, India

Mangifera 'Malda Fazli Mango'
- Genus: Mangifera
- Species: Mangifera indica
- Cultivar: 'Malda Fazli Mango'
- Origin: India

The 'Malda Fazli' mango, is a mango cultivar primarily grown in Malda district, West Bengal, India. It is also known as 'Fazli Babu'.

== Description ==
The Malda Fazli mango is a variety known for its attractive large size appearance with yellow-green colour, sweetness, and mouth-melting taste. This fruit has yellow-orange skin with hints of red, fleshy pulp with fiber, and a distinct aroma.

== Name & Origins ==
It was named after Fazal Bibi who belonged to the village of Arapur which falls in English Bazar subdivision of Malda district.

== Geographical indication ==
It was awarded the Geographical Indication (GI) status tag from the Geographical Indications Registry under the Union Government of India on 26 May 2008 (valid until 9 September 2027).

Patent Information Centre, West Bengal State Council of Science & Technology, Department of Science and Technology (DST) from Kolkata proposed the GI registration of the Malda Fazli Mango. After filing the application in 2007, the fruit was granted the GI tag in 2008 by the Geographical Indication Registry in Chennai, making the name "Malda Fazli Mango" exclusive to the mangoes grown in the region. It thus became the third mango variety from West Bengal after Malda Khirsapati (Himsagar) mango and the 6th type of goods from West Bengal to earn the GI tag.

== See also ==
- List of mango cultivars
- List of Geographical Indications in India
