= Toda Embroidery =

Embroidery of the Toda pastoral people of Nilgiris, in Tamil Nadu

- Geographical indication
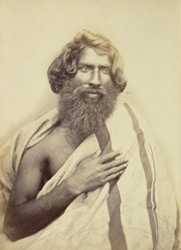
- Toda man wearing a Toda embroidered shawl
- Alternative names: Pukhoor meaning "flower"
- Type: Embroidery
- Area: Niligiris, Tamilnadu
- Country: India
- Registered: March 2013
- Material: Cotton

Toda embroidery, also locally known as "pukhoor", is an art work among the Toda pastoral people of Nilgiris, in Tamil Nadu, made exclusively by their women. The embroidery, which has a fine finish, appears like a woven cloth but is made with use of red and black threads with a white cotton cloth background. Both sides of the embroidered fabric are usable and the Toda people are proud of this heritage. Both men and women adorn themselves with the embroidered cloaks and shawls.

This handicraft product is listed as a geographically tagged product and is protected under the Geographical Indications of Goods (Registration & Protection) Act (GI Act) 1999 of the Government of India. It was registered by the Controller General of Patents Designs and Trademarks under the title "Toda Embroidery" and recorded at GI Application number 135 under Class 24, Class 25, and Class 26 as Textiles and Textile Goods, clothing, and Embroidery, respectively, in March 2013. A certificate of the GI registration was formally presented to the community leaders in June 2013. This was first initiated in 2008 and the agencies who supported this registration are the Toda Nalavaazhvu Sangam, Keystone Foundation, and Poompuhar.

== Location ==
This art heritage is practiced by the Toda tribals based in the Nilgiris (literally meaning 'neelam', the "Blue Hills") located in an elevation range of 900 to 2,636 metres (2,953 to 8,648 ft).

== History ==
The Todas (also known by names such as Tudas, Tudavans, and Todar) who make this embroidery live as one small community, population of 1,600 spread over 69 settlements, and about 400 of them are stated to be engaged in the embroidery work) in the Nilgiri Hills in the higher elevations of the Niligiri plateau, in Tamil Nadu. Apart from their vocation as herdsmen of buffaloes and cultivation in the grass lands, they are also involved in the tradition of making many handicrafts items which includes traditional black and red embroidery practiced by the women of the community; the embroidery is usually made on their cloaks called "pootkhul(zh)y" which is draped by both their men and women.

Murray Emeneau, a well known linguist of the Toda language, had referred to nine Toda embroidery designs in his paper published in 1937. There are earlier mention in the ancient ethnographic documents of the Toda women working on this art form in the western region of the Nilgiri plateau.

== Production process ==
The local terms used to describe the embroidery work are 'kuty' or 'awtty' meaning "stitching" and 'kutyvoy' meaning the embroidered piece. The materials used in this work are roughly woven white cloth, woolen black and red threads with use occasionally of blue threads and manufactured needles. The designs developed relate to nature and the daily cycle of life.

The fabric used is coarse bleached half white cotton cloth with bands; the woven bands on the fabric consist of two bands, one in red and one band in black, spaced at six inches. Embroidery is limited to the space within the bands and is done by using a single stitch darning needle. It is not done within an embroidery frame but is done by counting the warp and weft on the fabric which has uniform structure by the reverse stitch method. To bring out a rich texture in the embroidered fabric, during the process of needle stitching, a small amount of tuft is deliberately allowed to bulge. Geometric pattern is achieved by counting the warp and weft in the cloth used for embroidery.

Though their favorite study is related floral landscape, the patterns used in Toda embroidery do not cover many floral motifs but generally cover celestial bodies (like Sun and Moon), reptiles, animals, and horns of buffaloes, made in crimson and black colours. Rabbit ears are a constant depiction on the boundary of the embroidered cloth. Another common design in the form of black triangles in a box design is done in honour of their first priest. Women who do embroidery consider their work as a "tribute to Nature". A dead body is always wrapped in an embroidered fabric with traditional designs and then buried. However, coloured stripes are used in fabrics of daily use. As a traditional garment, it is worn by both men and women at all ceremonial occasions and also at funerals. Elderly people of the community wear this cloth daily.

The inspecting agency to oversee the quality of embroidery is the Textile Committee of the Ministry of Textiles of the Government of India.
