= Thanjavur veena =

- Geographical indication
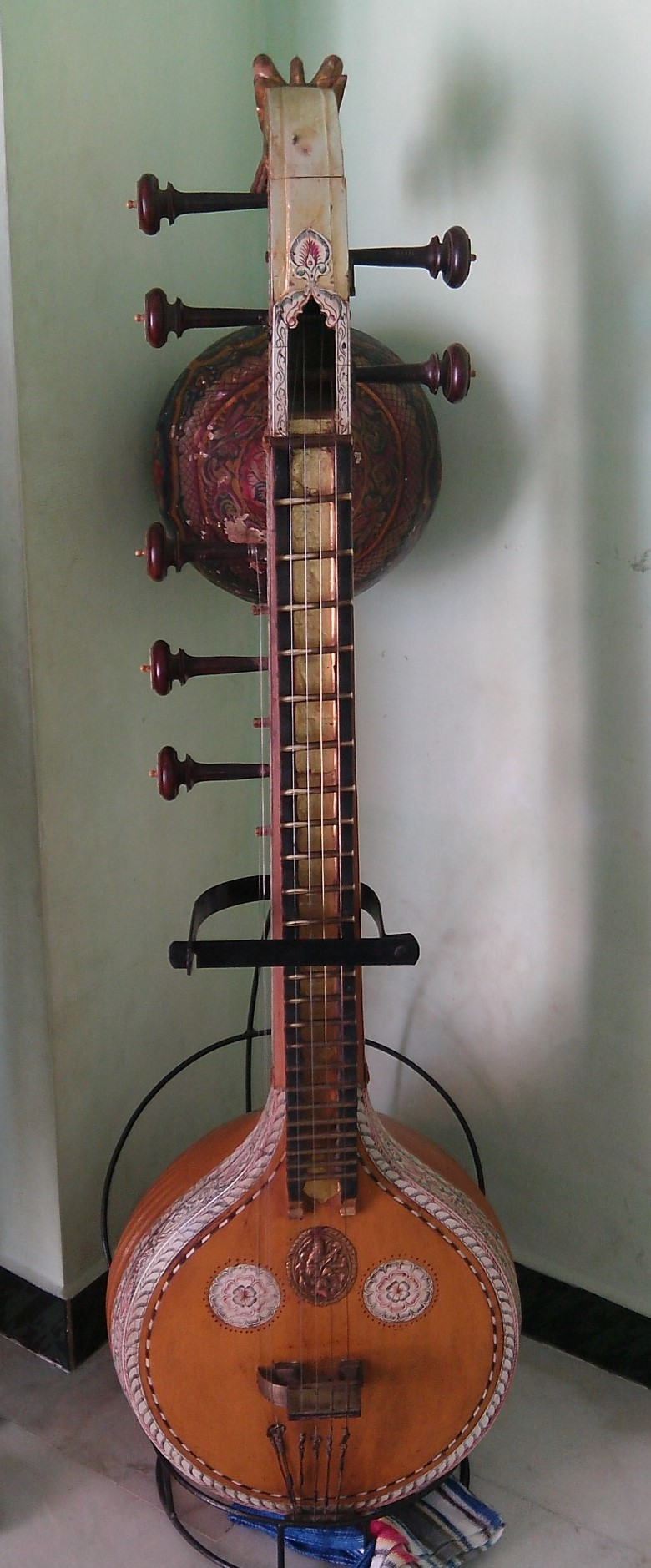
- Description: Veena (Chordophone musical instrument) from Thanjavur region
- Type: Handicraft
- Area: Thanjavur, Tamil Nadu
- Country: India
- Registered: 2012–13
- Material: Jackfruit tree wood

Thanjavur veena is a type of veena (a Chordophone musical instrument) from the Thanjavur region in the Indian state of Tamil Nadu. It was declared as a Geographical indication in 2012-13 and was the first musical instrument in the country to be accorded the status.

== Description ==
Veena is a type of Chordophone musical instrument, which has been mentioned in the Vedas. Thanjavur veena is a type of Saraswati Veena, about 4 ft (1.2 m) long. It consists of a rounded wooden resonator and a thick, long neck, similar to a lute. The end of the neck is carved into intricate patterns and a tuning box attached to the underside of the neck. Wood from the jack fruit tree is used, which is cut, dried and carved into shape. The veena has four linear playing strings on the top of the neck and three drone strings on the side along with 24 fixed frets. The metal frets are coated with beeswax mixed with charcoal powder. There are two ways of manufacturing: "Ekantha veena" involves carving the entire structure from a single piece of wood and in case of "Ottu veena" or "Sada veena", the parts are made separately and assembled.
