= Chettinad Kottan =

Indian type of basket woven from palm leaves

- Geographical indication
- Description: Palm leaf baskets from Chettinad region
- Type: Handicraft
- Area: Chettinad, Tamil Nadu
- Country: India
- Registered: 2012–13
- Material: Palm leaf

Chettinad Kottan is a type of basket woven from palm leaves in the Chettinad region in the Indian state of Tamil Nadu. It was declared as a Geographical indication in 2012–13.

== Description ==
Kottans are traditional baskets weaved from dried palm leaves in the Chettinad region of Tamil Nadu. The palm leaves are dried in the sun for a week till they become brown in color. The individual leaflets are separated from the stalk by hand with the central veins removed using a needle like instrument called "satyaagam". The leaflets are soaked in water to soften them and cut according to the required sizes. Organic dyes are used to color the leaves. The palm strips are woven into an intricate pattern by hands. The rims are lined with multiple layers for increased strength and the corners are threaded to hold them in place.
