= Eathomozhy Tall Coconut =

- Geographical indication
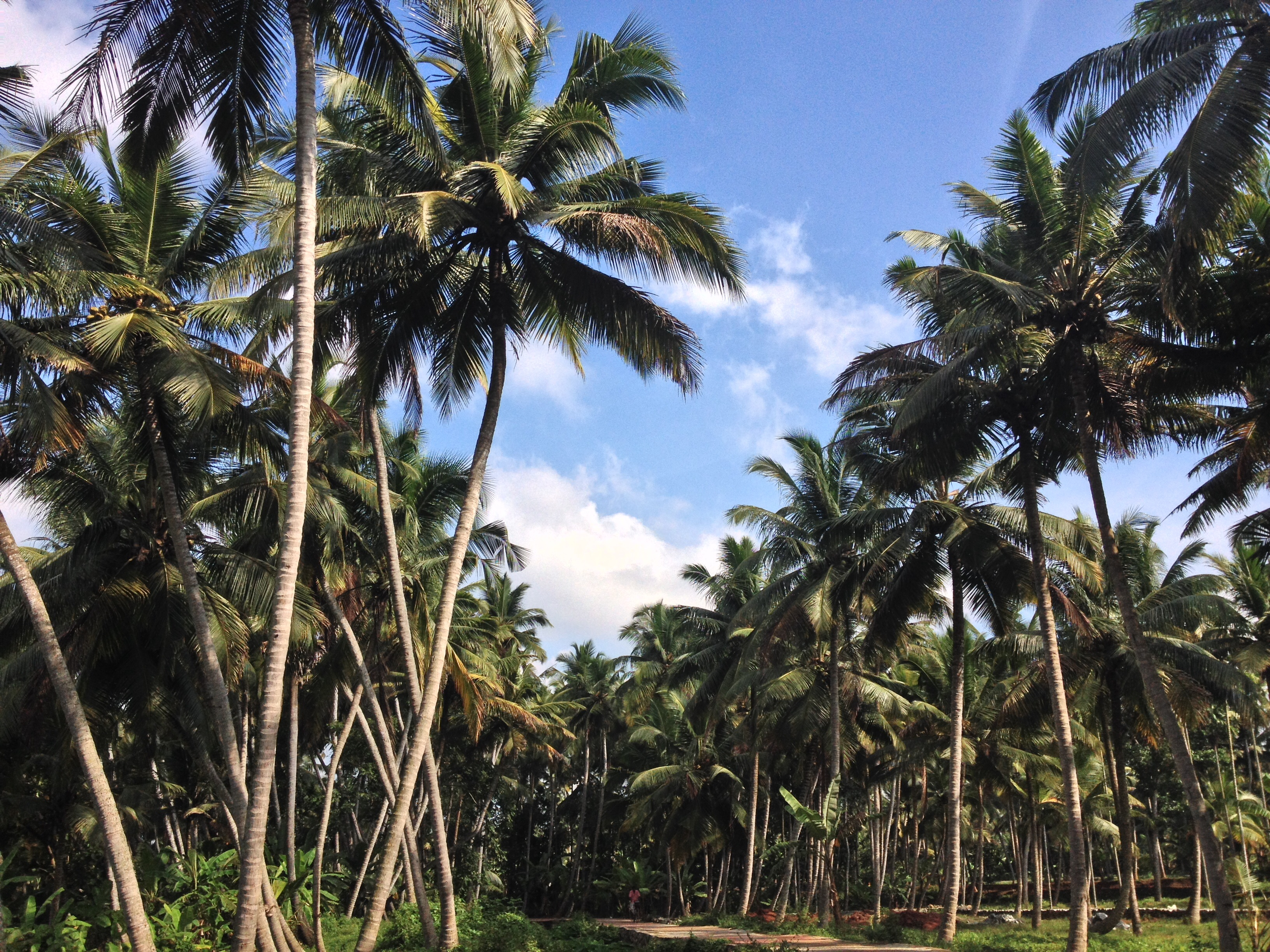
- Description: Coconut trees grown in Eathomozhy region
- Type: Agricultural
- Area: Eathomozhy, Kanniyakumari district, Tamil Nadu
- Country: India
- Registered: 2008–09

Eathomozhy Tall Coconut is a type of coconut tree grown in the Eathomozhy region in Kanniyakumari district of the Indian state of Tamil Nadu. It was declared as a Geographical indication in 2008–09. In 2023, India Post issued a ₹5 stamp representing the same.

== Description ==
It is a variety of coconut that grows in saline red soil found in the southern coast of India. The trees are tall, growing up to 30 m (98 ft) with strong stems. The canopy consists of about 30 to 36 thick, long leaves and large sized fruits. The fruit consists of more fiber, thick shell and a large copra. The trees have an average lifespan of 80 to 100 years and are often grown in rain-fed areas. They have a high resistance to traditional diseases affecting coconut trees. The copra is used to extract coconut oil, which is used in the production of cosmetics and the thick fibre is used in coir production.
