= Wayanaad Robusta Coffee =

Geographical indication coffee from Kerala, India

Wayanad Robusta coffee (also spelt Wayanaad Robusta) is a robusta coffee (Coffea canephora) grown in the Wayanad district of the Indian state of Kerala. It was granted a geographical indication (GI) tag in 2019, with the Coffee Board of India as the registered proprietor. Robusta makes up more than 95 per cent of the coffee grown in Wayanad, and the district accounts for about 70 per cent of Kerala's coffee output.

== History ==
Coffee was introduced to the Wayanad hills by the British East India Company in the early 19th century, with early plantations on the Ambukuthy hills near Mananthavady. Parry and Company of Madras began cultivation on a larger scale from 1841, and by 1869 Wayanad held about half of the roughly 120,000 acres under arabica in South India. After outbreaks of pests and disease damaged the arabica crop, robusta, which is more resistant to leaf rust, was planted in the second half of the 19th century and gradually took over.

== Cultivation and characteristics ==
The coffee is grown between about 700 and 2,100 metres above sea level, mostly under the shade of pepper and spice gardens. The district has roughly 67,000 hectares under coffee, farmed largely by about 60,000 smallholders. Yields range from around 1,400 kg per hectare under rainfed conditions to about 2,500 kg per hectare where the crop is irrigated. In the cup the coffee is described as soft to neutral, full-bodied, and intensely aromatic with a hint of chocolate, and it is used mainly for blending with arabica and in espresso.

== Geographical indication ==
The application for GI protection was filed on 28 December 2017 by the Coffee Board of India and registered under class 30 (coffee). The tag was granted in 2019, when the Geographical Indications Registry certified five Indian coffees: Coorg Arabica, Wayanaad Robusta, Chikmagalur Arabica, Araku Valley Arabica and Bababudangiris Arabica.

== Recognition ==
In July 2025, Wayanad Robusta coffee received a special mention in the agriculture category at the national One District One Product (ODOP) meet held by the Union Ministry of Commerce and Industry in New Delhi, the first such recognition for a product from Kerala.
