= Temple Jewellery of Nagercoil =

Handicraft from India

- Geographical indication
- Description: Jewellery from Nagercoil region
- Type: Handicraft
- Area: Nagercoil, Kanniyakumari district, Tamil Nadu
- Country: India
- Registered: 2007–08
- Material: Gold, precious stones

Temple Jewellery of Nagercoil is a type of gold jewellery from the Nagercoil region in the Indian state of Tamil Nadu. It was declared as a Geographical indication in 2007–08.

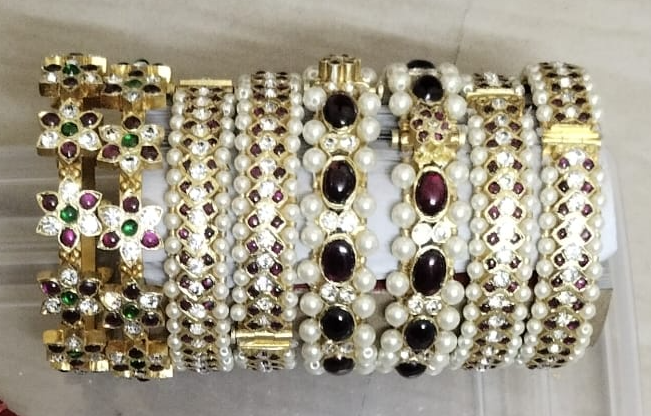
Traditional Kemp stone bangle used in Bharatanatyam dance.

The jewellery is made from gold interspersed with precious stones. A special type of red and green colored stone called "Kuchu kal" is used for making the jewellery. The history dates back to the reign of Chola dynasty in the ninth century CE. The jewellery was initially crafted specifically to decorate the idols of Hindu gods and goddesses.
