= Tripura Risa Textile =

Indian traditional handwoven

Tripura Risa Textile or Risa Textile is a traditional handwoven cloth from Tripura, India, recently granted a Geographical Indication (GI) tag.

== Description ==
It is primarily woven by women using a loin loom, Risa is known for its vibrant colors and intricate designs. It holds significant cultural and social value within the Tripuri communities, serving as a female upper garment, headgear, stole, and a symbol of respect. The Risa Sormani ceremony, where adolescent girls receive their first Risa, marks a significant transition. The GI tag protects the unique origin and craftsmanship of Tripura Risa Textile, promoting its preservation and sustainable development.
