= Dhalapathar Parda & Fabrics =

Handicraft appellation of Dhalapathar, Odisha, India

- Geographical indication
- Alternative names: Dhalapathara Parada
- Type: Handicraft
- Area: Dhalapathar; Bolagarh; Odisha
- Country: India
- Material: Fabric

Dhalapather Parda & Fabrics is an Indian handicraft appellation.

== Parda ==
Parda art has been registered under Geographical Identification (GI) by the government of India.

The works are made in Dhalapathara Village of Bolagarh, Khurda district.

A Parda handicraft is usually sewn with a hand-made spinning machine using threads in natural colours. It was invented by Ganesha Pujari, while Udayanath Sahu designed the craft.

== Preparation ==
Pictures are drawn on a screen and colored using natural colorings from the mango tree bark, Jamun. The standardized length of a screen is approximately 6'×4'. Therefore, it can take more than a month to make a single screen.

== Business ==
The Parda fabric trade peaked in 1930. At that time, the selling price per piece was 150 to 250 INR. During various festivals and ceremonies, this was the preferred choice in fashion. The business spread across many parts of India at this time, including Delhi.
