= Kodaikanal Malai Poondu =

- Geographical indication
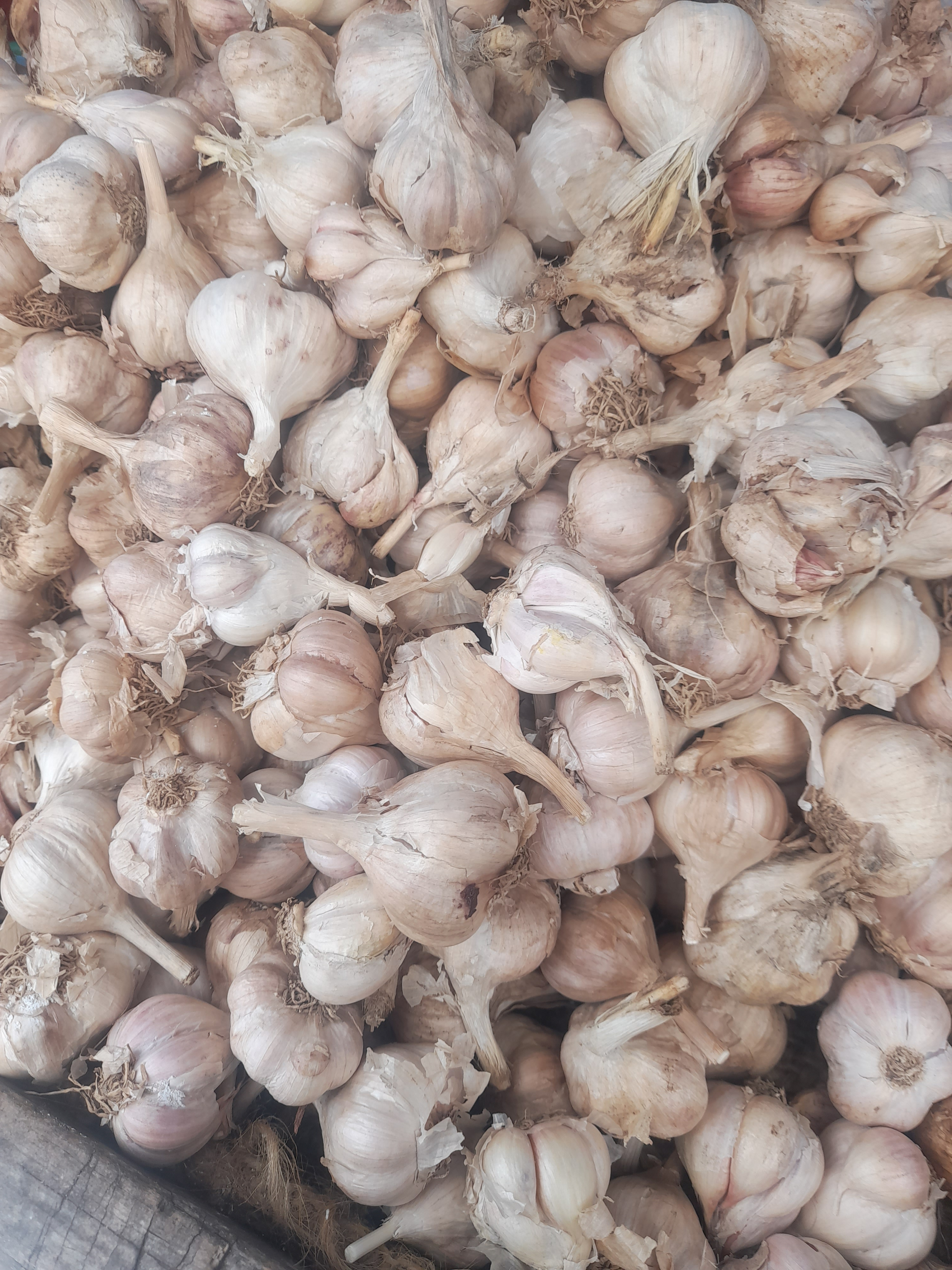
- Description: One of the garlic varieties cultivated in Tamil Nadu
- Type: Agricultural Product
- Area: Poombarai, Mannavanur, Poondi, Kilavarai, Kodaikanal Upper Hill Villages, Dindigul District,
- Country: India
- Registered: 01 July 2018
- Official website: ipindia.gov.in

Kodaikanal Malai Poondu (Kodaikanal Hill Garlic) is an important traditional variety of garlic cultivated in the Indian state of Tamil Nadu. It is primarily grown in the upper hill regions of Kodaikanal in the Dindigul district.

Under the Geographical Indication list, it is referred to as "Kodaikanal Malai Poondu" as per the GI tag.

== Name ==
Kodaikanal Malai Poondu is named after the Kodaikanal region, which is the place of origin for Kodaikanal Malai Poondu (Kodaikanal Hill Garlic).

== Description ==
Kodaikanal is a hill station located in the Western Ghats of the Dindigul district of Tamil Nadu. The cultivation of Kodaikanal Malai Poondu has been taking place for over 100 years in the hill villages, including Poombarai, Mannavanur, Poondi, and Kilavarai.

Its botanical name is Allium sativum. This garlic variety, which only grows once every six months in this hill region, is not pure white but rather a slight ash/grey colour. This pungent hill garlic is rich in medicinal properties. This specific garlic is known for its medicinal and preservative properties due to its antioxidant and antimicrobial potential. Compared to other varieties of garlic, it has a higher amount of organosulfur compounds, phenols, and flavonoids.

== Geographical Indication (GI) ==
Kodaikanal Malai Poondu was granted Geographical Indication (GI) status by the Geographical Indication Registry under the Government of India on July 30, 2019. This status is valid until May 31, 2028. The valuable geographical identity provided by the GI registration certifies that a product possesses unique qualities, follows traditional production methods, and has a reputation rooted in its geographical origin.
