= Usta art =

Usta art is the Naqqashi and Manoti art practiced by Usta artisans from the Bikaner district in the northwest of the state of Rajasthan in northern India.

== History ==
The term usta is derived from Persian word ustad or master in a particular art or several arts. During the period of Mughal emperor Akbar. a group of Usta artists came to Bikaner in the royal patronage of Maharaja Rai Singh to perform design work at the famous Junagarh Fort of Bikaner. The craftsmanship and skill of those artists can be seen even today in the Anup Mahal, Phool Mahal and Karan Mahal of Junagarh fort.

Usta art is a broad term which is the combination of many different form of arts and techniques. In current times, most popular form seen is Sunehri Munawwati Nakkashi work which means gold emboss work. This form of art is performed on walls, ceilings, glass, wood, marble and artifacts made of camel leather. On all the mentioned surfaces, very fine work is performed using best quality material. During its origin, all the forms of usta art other than paintings were generally seen on walls but during the British period, a need was felt to perform the usta art on such a material which remains light and easy to carry, so the pots which were made of camel leather and were used to carry oil and fragrance in those times became best alternate for doing gold work on them.

Sunehri Munawwati Nakkashi work or gold emboss work is completed in many stages. Firstly smooth surface is prepared by applying natural primer, then measurement is taken for drawing the designs. The designs are drawn on the surface, then akhbara or first stage of work is done, in this the floral design is filled, using brush and color. When it is dried, the floral design is embossed through brush by using a paste prepared by mixing pot clay powder, gum, jaggery and 'naushadar', on this embossed design a layer of yellow paint is applied and is left to harden-dry again, a coat of the yellow paint is applied and when it is dried, the gold foils are applied and the details of emboss are drawn through very fine brush and design is filled with color.
