= Textile industry in Salem =

Overview of textiles in Salem, India

The textile industry in Salem, especially the handloom industry, is one of the most ancient cottage industries in Salem district of Tamil Nadu, India. Salem was one of the primary handloom centers of south India. Sari, dhoti and angavasthram are made out of silk yarn and cotton yarn. In the recent past, home furnishing items are also woven, mainly for export purposes. More than 75,000 handlooms are working and the total value of cloth produced per annum is estimated at Rs.5,000 crores

== Salem fabric ==
Salem fabric (handicraft goods) earned recognition with Geographical Indication Registry (India).

== History ==
The history of hand loom and spinning mills dates back to pre-independence period in Salem. But till the 1960s there were fewer than 5 spinning mills. Private handloom weaving started thriving in the region along with the large scale cooperative sector handloom weaving and marketing units. Small scale hand dying units were started around the region to support the industry. Around the 1980s the texindustry saw a massive growth. Many major spinning mills and waste spinning units came up into existence. Many Handloom societies and dye houses were established. New and Increased number of Power Loom units in places like Gugai, Ammapet, Attayampatti, Vennandur, Magudanchavadi, Rasipuram, Komarapalayam and Pallipalayam, Tharamangalam, Jalakandapuram and Ellampillai. But now there are more than 125 spinning mills, with modern weaving units and garment units. Garment export has established itself as one of the major business in the district. Established market linkages by the small business units directly exporting the cloth materials and garments made the industry grow in a fast pace. Easy access to necessary inputs like yarns and dying units have led to the customisation of garments even at the small scale customized products.

== Kondalampatti Sarees ==
Kondalampatti is a small census town in the district and it is famous for its silk handloom products. Kondalampatti handlooms are well known for the durability of the colours used in the yarn. The mixture of colour gives the durability. The count of the threads in a square inch used in weaving gives the softness and hardness of the fabric. In Kondalampatti sarees 60 to 65 threads are used in a square inch in warp. The width of the saree comes to 51 inches. Each and every thread of the Kondalampatti handloom saree is hand woven. It requires approximately 4–8 days of effort for weaving a saree.
