= Sankheda furniture =

Lacquered teak furniture from Gujarat, India

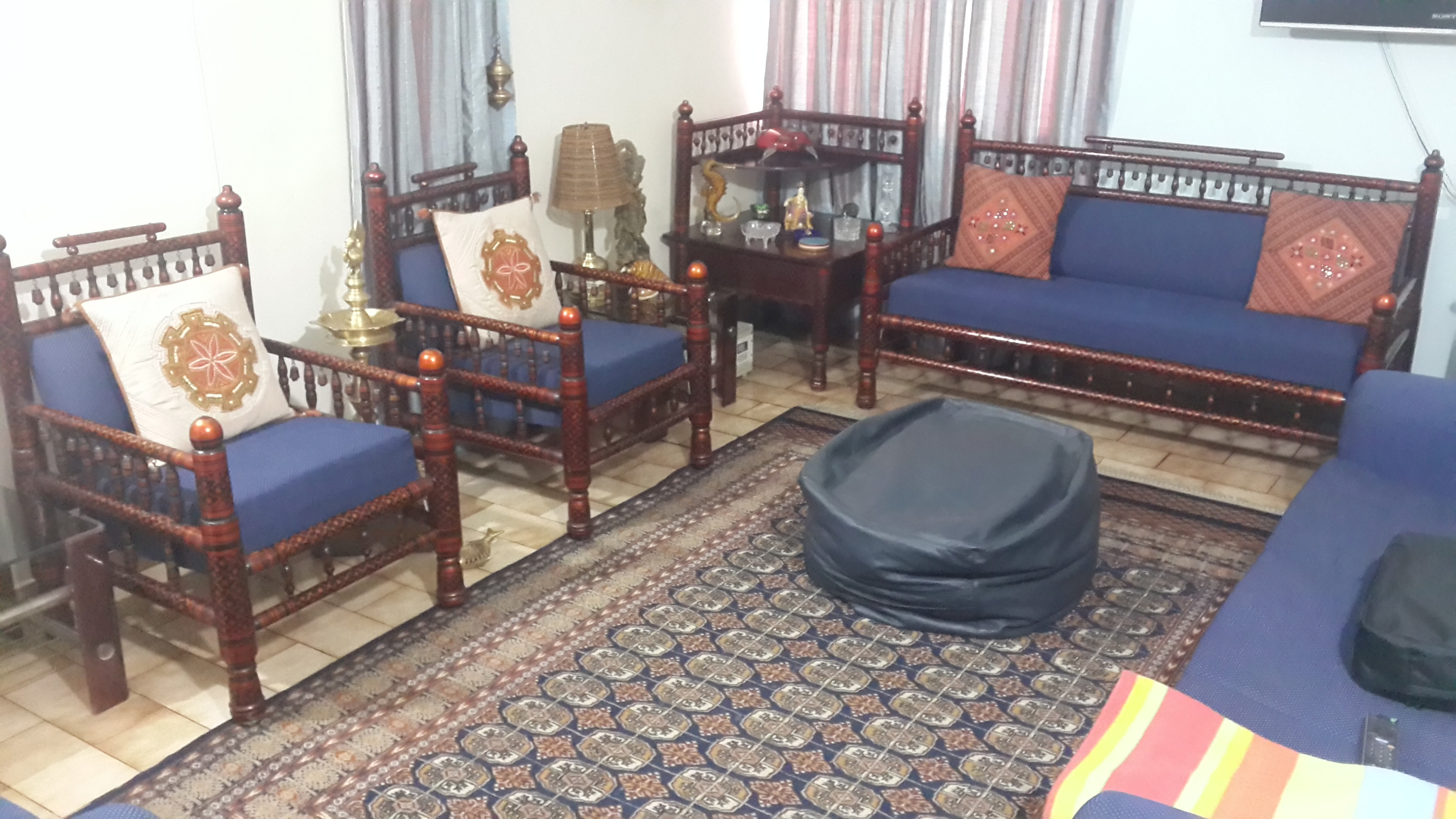
Sankheda furniture in a living room setting

Sankheda furniture is colourful teak wood furniture of Gujarat, India, treated with lacquer and painted in traditional bright shades of maroon and gold. It is made in Sankheda village and hence its name. The village is located about 45 kilometres (28 mi) from Vadodara.

In recent years, colour innovation has been adopted with black, blue, green, ivory, copper, silver and burgundy shades. The product is not only widely marketed in India but is exported to many countries including Europe and West Asia. Now with the adoption of chemical pigments, instead of the traditional organic dyes and pulp of kewda leaves (fragrant screw pine) as a colouring base, the palette has many colours to offer for painting the furniture. However, the "tinfoil patterns with transparent lacquer coating" is the basic traditional method which is continued, with polishing done with agate.

The product is protected under the Geographical Indications of Goods (Registration & Protection) Act (GI Act) 1999 of the Government of India. It was registered by the Controller General of Patents Designs and Trademarks on 5 July 2007 under the title "Sankheda Furniture" and listed at GI Application number 100 under Class 20 on 5 July 2007 as a handicraft item.

== History ==
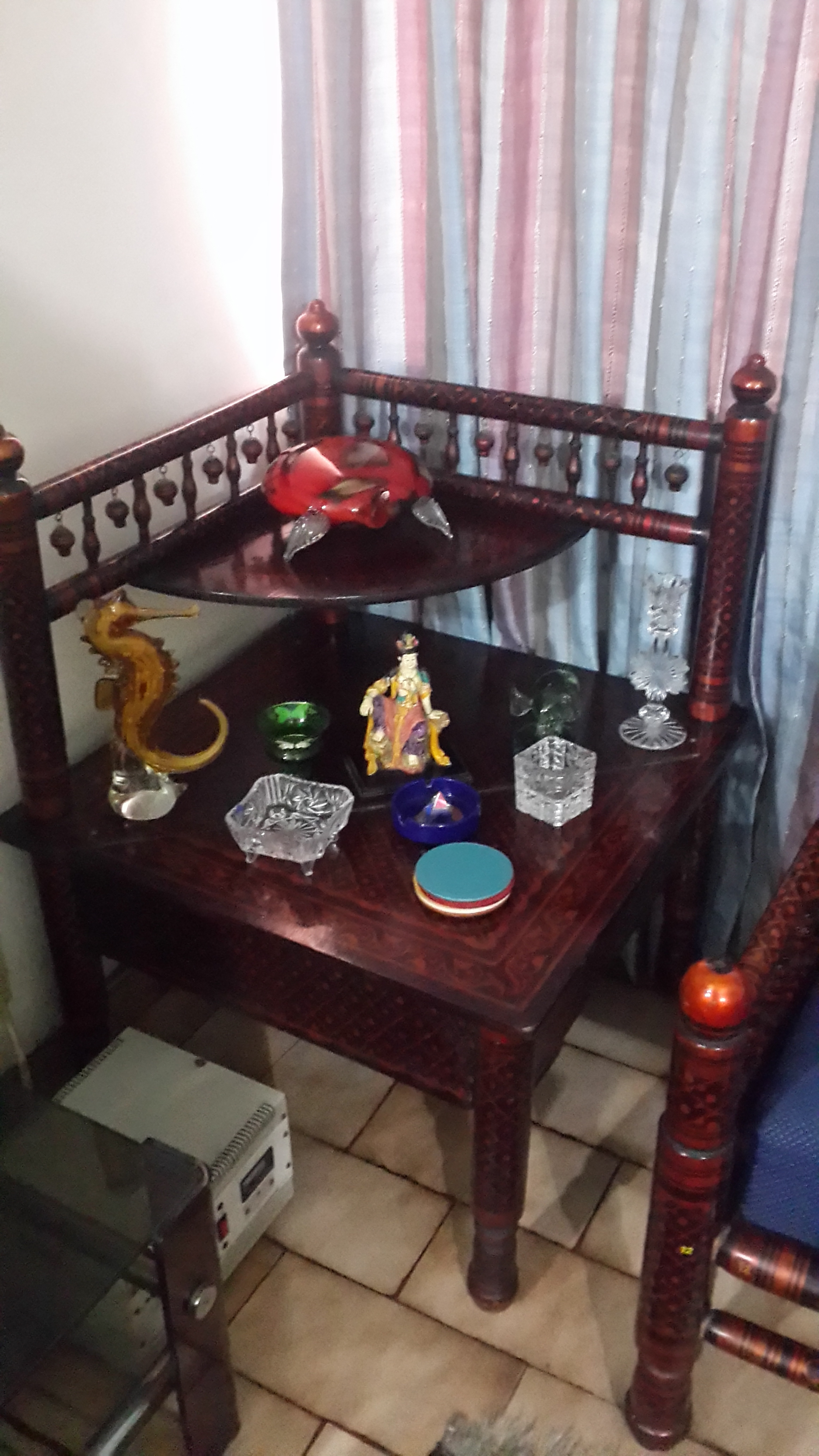
Sankheda furniture corner table

According to historical records this type of furniture was reported in the 17th century by George Rocques, a French writer and James Forbes, a British civil servant. At that time teak wood used to make this furniture was transported from Valsad and painted with indigenous colours. The product was then exported from Surat and Khambhat ports.

A local legend narrated to the origin of this craft form is that a spiritually oriented person, to avoid Mughal invaders, came to Sankheda and stayed in a hut with a wood cutter who looked after him. After staying with him for a long period he suddenly disappeared. However, the night he vanished from the village, the wood cutter saw him in his dream and the sagely person blessed him with skills of craftsmanship in carpentry. The wood cutter then became a carpenter and started carving furniture using lacquer coating.

To promote this craftsmanship, a training institute has been established in Ahmedabad.

== Products ==
Apart from traditional furniture in a wide range of three piece settees, headboards, beds, garden swings, dressing tables, rocking chairs, tables, screens, divan, etc., other handicraft innovations introduced in this format are wall-hangings, pedestal lamps, flower vases and pen stands, toys, kitchen ware and support for hammocks. Though the design appears fragile, the furniture is durable and lasts for a long period. It is a custom among the Gujarati community to gift this traditional furniture as an auspicious gift during marriage.
