= Lakshmanbhog =

Mango cultivar

- Geographical indication
- Description: Lakshmanabhog is an aromatic Indian mango, mainly cultivated in Malda, West Bengal.
- Type: Agricultural
- Area: Malda, West Bengal
- Country: India
- Registered: 2008

The Lakshmanbhog is a mango with very sweet taste, which is grown and harvested in the Indian state of West Bengal. Since 2008, the term Malda Laxman Bhog Mango is a registered geographical indication referring to the product—the Laxmanbhog mango—produced within Malda district. Apart from West Bengal, this mango is cultivated in Bihar and the neighboring country of Bangladesh. Mangoes are almost fibreless and agreeable in flavor; attractive orange yellow in color and very sweet in taste.

In the middle of the mango season, usually June, these mangoes ripen, and are harvested from the trees and marketed. Malda district has about 32,000 hectares of mango orchards. The Government of India and the Government of West Bengal have chosen Lakshmanbhog with Himsagar (Khirsapat) as export varieties along with Alphonso mango.
