= Villianur Terracotta Works =

- Geographical indication
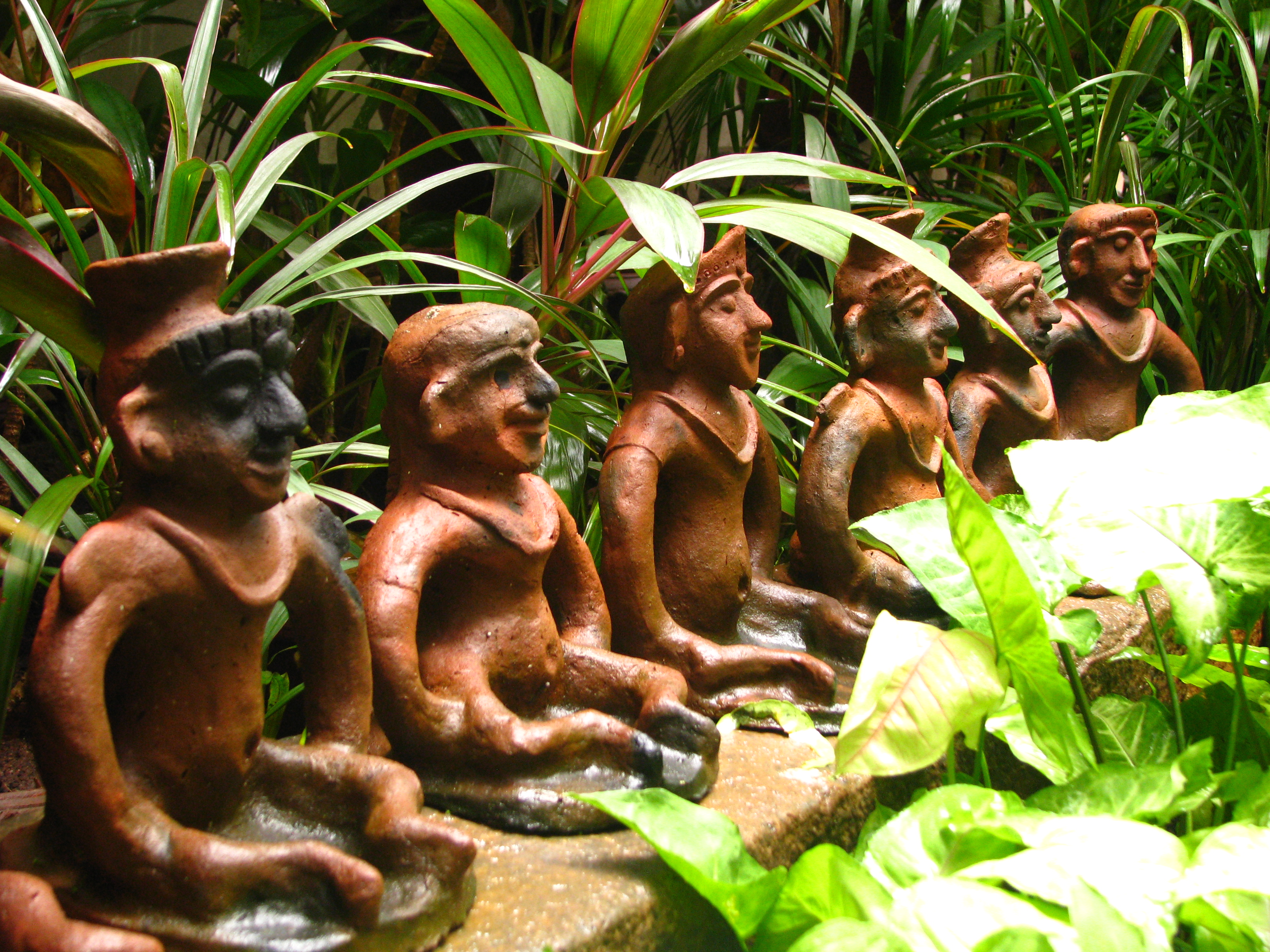
- Terracotta statues in Pondicherry
- Alternative names: Villianur Terracotta Works
- Description: Terracotta
- Type: Handicraft
- Area: Pondicherry
- Country: India
- Material: Green Clay, fine sand and thennal

The Villianur Terracotta Works are handicrafts made from fine green clay, fine sand and thennal which are handmade by villagers of Villianur, in the union territory Pondicherry also spelled Pudhucherry, India. It has a history of more than 20 generations.

The handicraft product has been registered for protection under the Geographical indication of the Trade Related Intellectual Property Rights (TRIPS) agreement. In 2011, it was listed as "Villianur Terracotta Works" under the GI Act 1999 of the Government of India with registration confirmed by the Controller General of Patents Designs and Trademarks under Class 21 as an earthen ware, vide application number 201.

== Location ==
The terracotta products are made in and around Villianur commune in Panchayat of Pudhucherry. It is one of the 11 enclaves of Pudhucherry covering an area 290 square kilometres (110 sq mi) which is bounded on the west by the Villupuram and Cuddalore Districts of Tamil Nadu and the Bay of Bengal on the east.

== History ==
The history of making terracotta works in Pondicherry is not definitely established though archaeological excavations at Arikamedu (which had ancient maritime links with Rome during the first century AD) have unearthed fine quality terracotta toys which are considered of finer quality than the type made by the Satavahanas.

This art work is particularly traced to Villianur village and its neighboring areas, as an ancestral legacy of over 20 generations of the community known as "Kulalar". During the French rule of Pondicherry this art form received a fillip.

== Process of manufacture ==
The basic materials used in the handcrafting of the terracotta works are green clay, thennal and fine sand locally called savudu. Several types of tools made of bamboo are used in handcrafting the art forms. In the first step of processing clay is sifted to remove all stones. Then a mixture of 20 percent of clay, 40 percent of thennal and 40 percent of fine sand is made. After kneading thoroughly the mixture is cured by allowing it to dry for some time. The prepared mixture is then used in small quantities to make the products such as toys, statues, etc., in different forms. For making statues moulds are used for the body parts while the rest of the figures are ornamented with motifs by hand. The completed art work is then allowed to dry for 12 hours after which it is ready for sale.

To enhance the life of the statues, the craft work is subjected to the process of firing for about 30 minutes with Poda husk, powdered wood and Saanam. After firing, the craft work is covered with sand and allowed to cool.

Some of the products made are of gods, goddesses, divinities, animals forms, wall hangings and so forth. One of the tallest statues made is of a horse of 6 feet (1.8 m) height which can be detached and reassembled. The smallest size product measures about an inch, particularly of Ganesha.

A specialty of Villianur terracotta, which is not possible with other terracotta works, is that they can be made to a height of 30 feet (9.1 m) and moulded to any thickness.

Quality control is exercised by a committee consisting of 2 Master Craftsman of Villianur Terracotta Works, a representative from Pondicherry Crafts Foundation, and Associate Professors from National Institute of Fashion Technology (NIFT), Chennai.

A master craftsman of Villianur Terrcotta Works is V.K. Munusamy, who hails from Villianur village. He holds practical training classes in this art form which is attended by national and international students. He has received 68 awards from many countries and is also the recipient of UNESCO award in 2005 for his terracotta craftsmanship.

There are many terracotta units throughout Pondicherry where they make fine miniature images (of 3–5 inches (76–127 mm) ) also, apart from elaborately crafted larger figures of animals and religious icons.
