= Wooden Mask of Kushmandi =

- Geographical indication
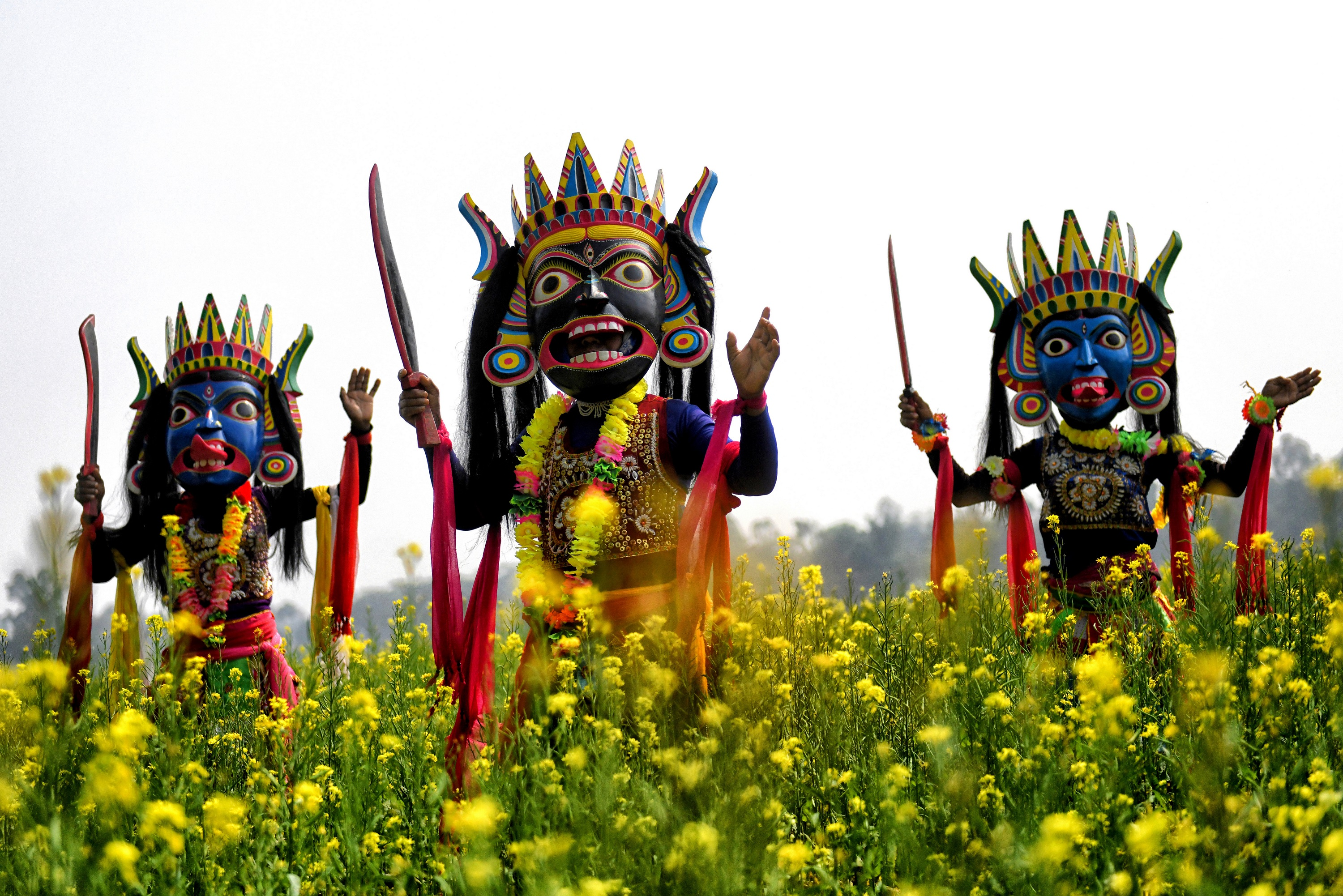
- Gomira dancers with masks
- Alternative names: Gomira Dance Mask
- Type: West Bengal folk cultural art
- Area: Kushmandi and nearby villages
- Country: India

Wooden Mask of Kushmandi, also known as Kushmandi Mask or Gomira Dance Mask and locally as Mukha, is a traditional cultural heritage of Kushmandi, Dakshin Dinajpur in the Indian state of West Bengal. It is a ritualistic non-vocal dance form mask worn by the local communities during the performance, to usher in Good forces and drive out Evil forces from the Villages.

Kushmandi's Wooden Mask has been accredited with a Geographical Indication (GI) tag in 2018.

== See also ==
- Chhau mask
- Masks of West Bengal
