= Khatwa =

Khatwa is the name given to appliqué works in Mithilanchal in the Indian subcontinent. Khatwa is about designing by cutting of one fabric and stitching the pieces to another fabric. Khatwa is mainly used to create designer tents, canopies and shamianas. In textiles, applique is sometimes confused with patchwork. Though both techniques derive from the recycling of old fabrics by sewing different fabrics to create one piece, they are quite distinguishable. Patchwork refers to a variety of fabrics sewn together to create a single textile pattern. On the other hand, applique refers to a variety of coloured fabrics and ornaments, such as small round mirrors, layered on top of one another in order to create elaborate designs by means of various forms of stitching. There is no restriction to the type of fabrics used in the creation of applique items, and may even be of varying textures. It is often found alongside embroidery and can be sub-divided into two techniques. The simple 'play by ear' technique consists of the open use of an assortment of materials of various shapes and sizes, stitched together without much preparation. The more complex technique involves thorough planning of the design before any work is done with the materials. Khatwa is about designing by cutting of one fabric and stitching the pieces to another fabric. Khatwa is mainly used to create designer tents, canopies, shamianas and much more. Making of such tents involves work by both men and women. While cutting of clothes is done by men, women use their expertise in stitching part. Khatwa is also used in designing women garments as well. This is where the real talent of people is seen in the work. The designs created are more sharp, intricate and highly appealing. Most of the garments shop sell these highly artistic clothes. People in some villages of Bihar are involved only in art works and it is their main source of income. Since the same skills are passed down to generations, the expertise and innovations are immaculate. It is believed that applique work made its way into western India either from Europe through trade contacts. It involves creation of designs by cutting one fabric and stitching the pieces onto another. “Khatwa” is used to craft decorative tents, canopies, shamianas, etc. A thick fabric and Geometric patterns are used while making the Tents on important occasion or functions.
