= Jaderi Namakatti =

Jaderi Namakatti is a holy clay stick that is white in color. It is a finger like structure that is manufactured in the village of Jaderi of Tamil Nadu. Hindus especially Vaishnavites use Namakatti.

== Production ==
Jaderi Namakatti is prepared in mass scale at Jaderi a village in Thiruvannamalai district. In Jaderi, more than 150 families are involved in the production of these clay sticks as a cottage industry. The selection of rock available near by area is a skill which makes namakatti to be rich deposited hydrous silicate.

The process of making Namakatti involves the following steps:

- Sourcing: The required white clay is sourced from calcium-rich white rocks found in the nearby Thenpundipattu panchayat.
- Processing: These rocks are quarried, ground into a fine powder, and soaked in water for two days.
- Refining: After soaking, the water and impurities are drained away.
- Molding: The white clay that settles at the bottom is collected and molded into sticks.
- Drying & Sale: These clay sticks are then dried in the sun and sold across the country.

== GI Tag ==
In 2023, the Namakatti produced in Jaderi village was officially granted the Geographical Indication (GI) tag.
