= Dokhona =

Traditional attire of the Boro people

Bodo Dokhona Dokhona
- Geographical indication
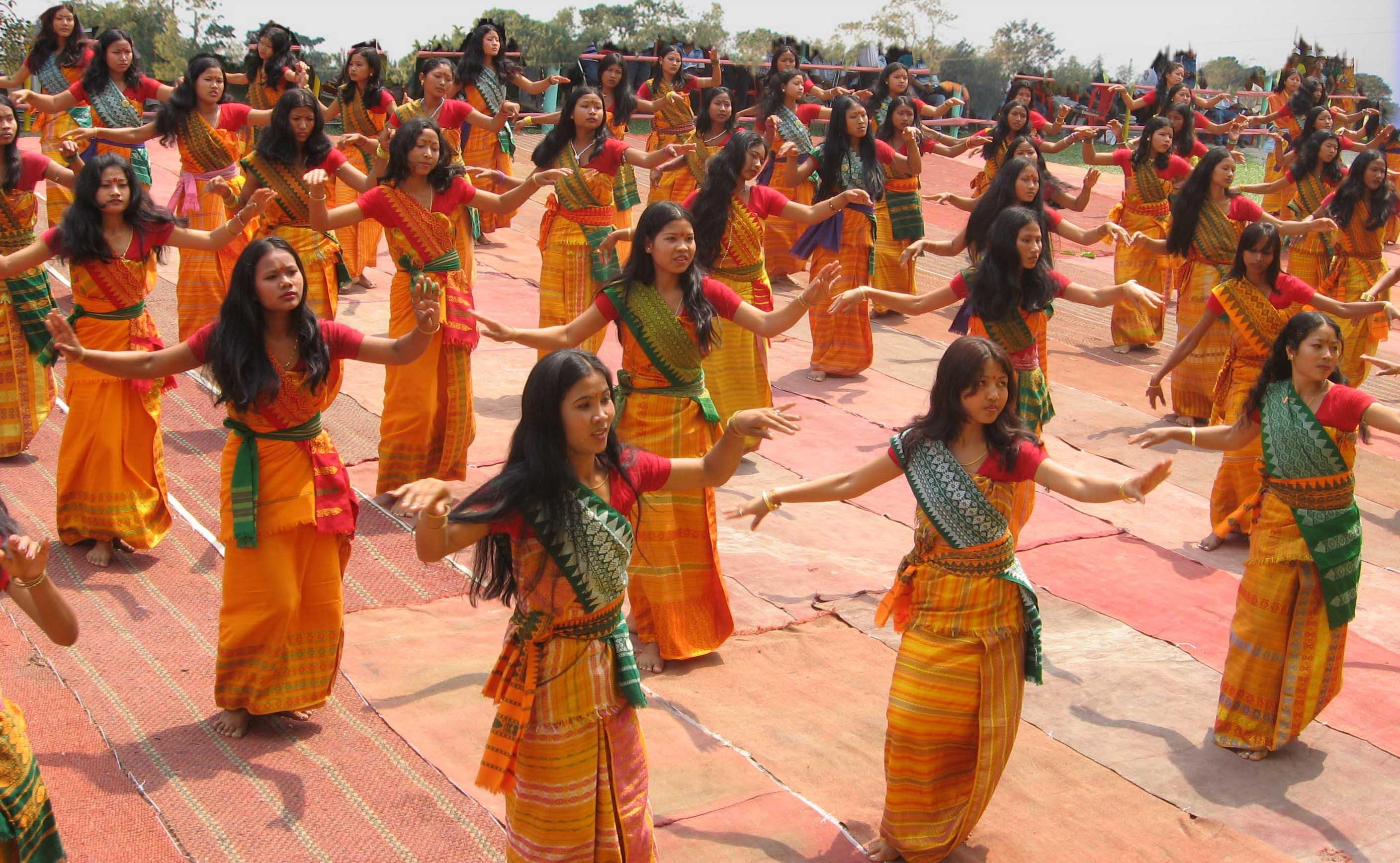
- Boro women wearing a dokhona dancing a Bagurumba
- Description: Textile fabric design
- Type: Cotton or silk
- Area: Bodoland, Assam
- Country: India
- Registered: 2024
- Material: Cotton

Dokhona (दख'ना in the Boro language)is the traditional attire of the Boro people, an indigenous ethnolinguistic community of Northeast India, primarily found in the Bodoland Territorial Region of Assam.

It is traditionally made from cotton and sometimes silk for special occasions, with an increasing tendance of using acrylic instead. It is traditionally yellow-colored. The garment can feature Agor, woven designs that depict patterns representing animals or landscapes.

== Etymology ==
The term "Dokhona" refers to a wrap-around garment traditionally worn by Boro women.

== Types ==
There are different styles and varieties of Dokhona:

- Plain (Chala Matha) Dokhona: A simple, undecorated version for daily wear.
- Designed (Agor Gwnang) Dokhona: Embellished with woven motifs used for special occasions like weddings or festivals.

Other regional styles and historical variations have been identified, including older forms of wrap called Ogrong Dokhona among certain sub-groups, which differ in draping style and motifs.

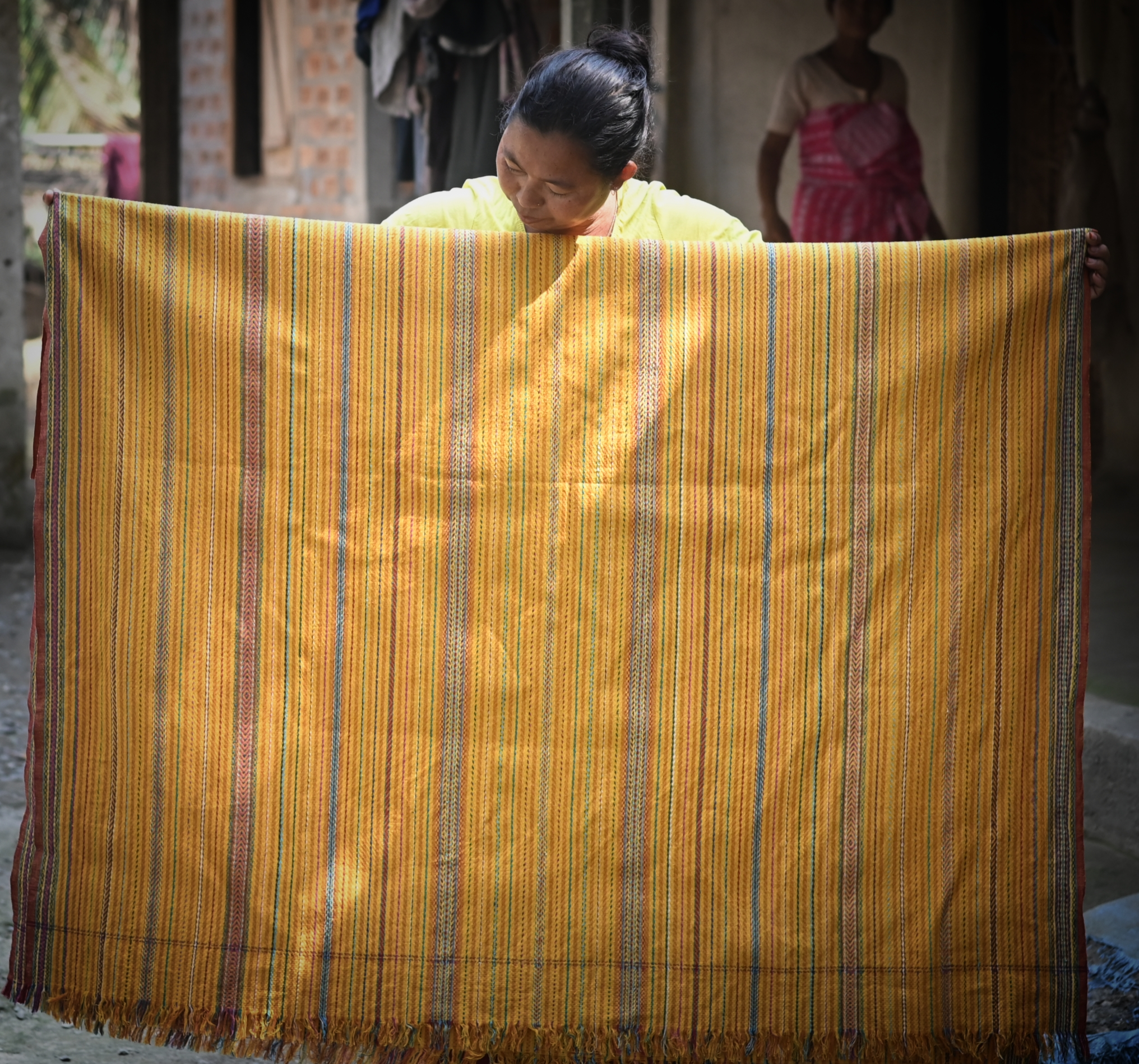
Agurguwai dokhona

== Cultural importance ==
In 2024, Dokhona, was officially recognised with 12 other Boro articles by a Geographical Indication (GI) tag by the Government of India.

Dokhona is usually paired with complementary garments:

- A blouse or upper garment, now often worn under the Dokhona.
- A Jwmgra or fasra, a scarf or shoulder cloth that provides additional decoration and coverage.
- An Aronai, a smaller decorative scarf worn by both men and women on special occasions.

== See also ==
- दख'ना (Dokhona, Garment in Boro) in Boro Wikipedia
