= Bandar laddu =

Andhra confectionery

Bandar_laddu
- Geographical indication
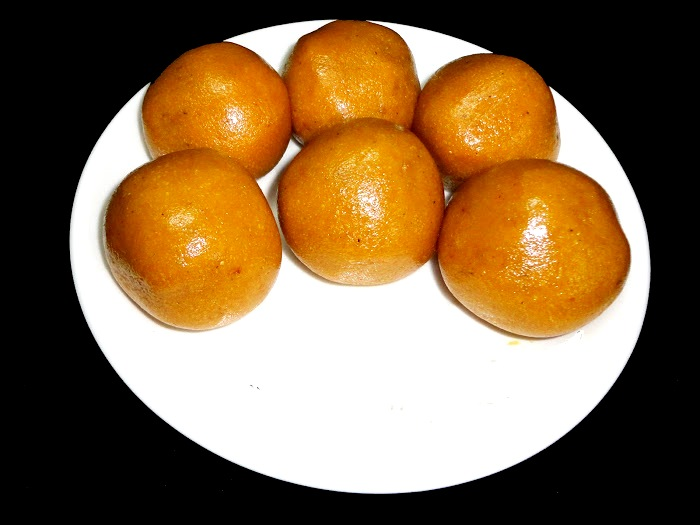
- Bandar Laddu
- Alternative names: Thokkudu Laddu
- Description: A sweet made from Bengal gram flour, Jaggery syrup and Ghee
- Type: Agricultural
- Area: Krishna district, Andhra Pradesh
- Country: India
- Material: Agricultural: Fruit

Bandar laddu, also known as Thokkudu laddu, is a mithai made with jaggery and ghee from Machilipatnam of Krishna district in the Indian state of Andhra Pradesh. It was registered as one of the geographical indication from Andhra Pradesh on 3 May 2017, under foodstuff by Geographical Indication Registry.
