= Gollabhama sari =

Saris native to Siddipet, Telangana

Gollabhama sari also Siddipet Gollabhama are saris made in Siddipet, Telangana, India. These cotton saris are popular for their inlay figure work and motifs.

== Geographical indication rights ==
The sari received Intellectual Property Rights Protection or Geographical Indication (GI) status.
