= Solapur terry towel =

Solapur Terry Towel
- Geographical indication
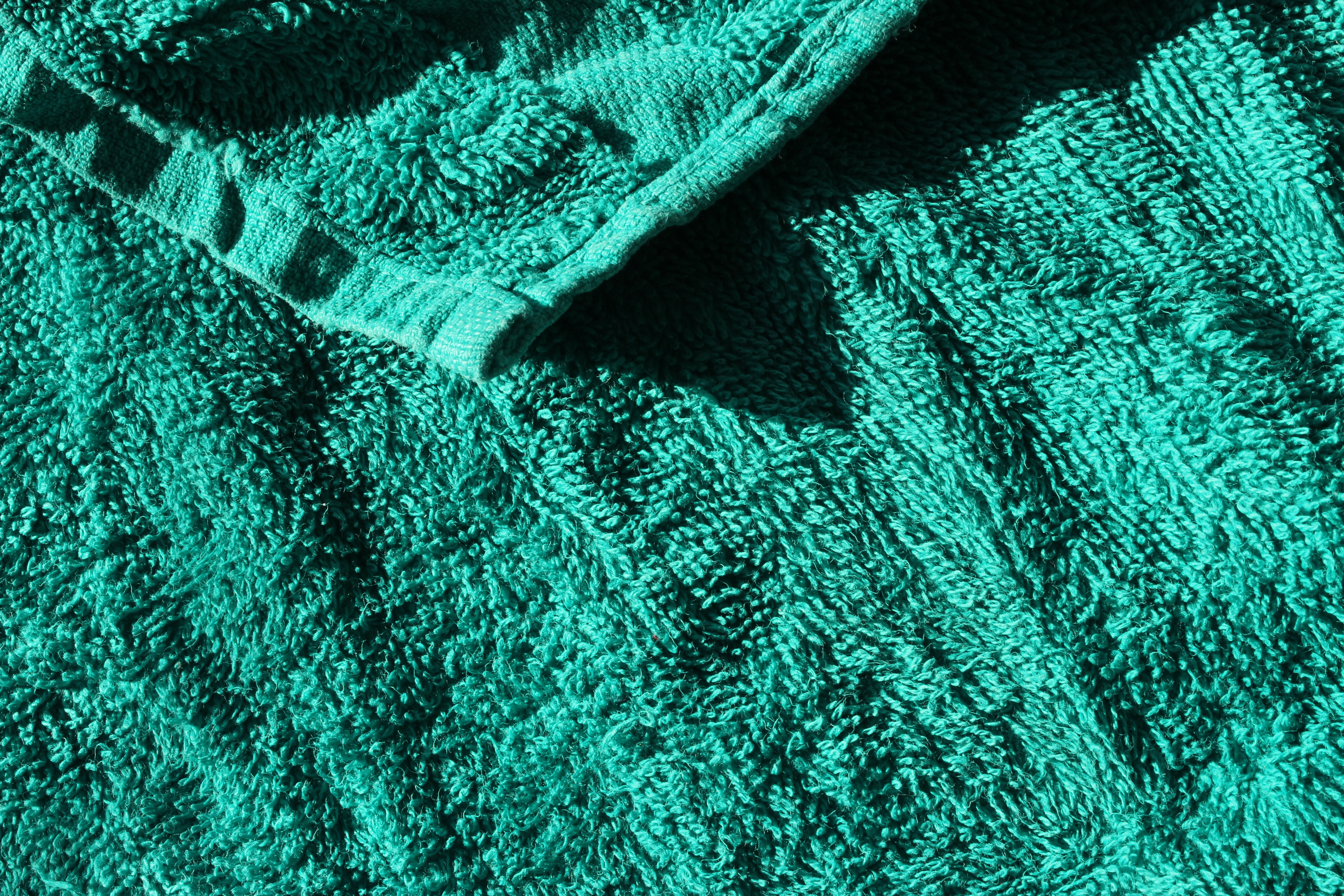
- a terry towel, similar products in Solapur
- Type: Handicraft
- Area: Solapur, Maharashtra
- Country: India
- Registered: 2005–2006
- Material: Cotton yarn

Solapur Terry Towel is terry towel weaving or knitting work that are manufactured in the Solapur district of Maharashtra state, India. The terry towel work has been protected under the Geographical indication (GI) of the Agreement on Trade-Related Aspects of Intellectual Property Rights (TRIPS) agreement. It is listed at item 9 as "Solapur Terry Towel" of the GI Act 1999 of the Government of India with registration confirmed by the Controller General of Patents Designs and Trademarks.

Solapur Terry Towel has unique design and it has global market. Also, it is allied production of Solapuri chaddar. The handicraft work gives livelihood assistance to nearly 200,000 people in Solapur district. Terry towel made by cotton yarn.

== See also ==
- Navalgund Durries
- Ilkal saree
