= E. I. Leather =

Indian vegetable-tanned leather

East India Leather is an Indian vegetable-tanned leather produced by the tanneries in Trichy and Dindigul in Tamil Nadu.

== History ==
E. I. Leather has been there in the region since 1856, under the British Raj. The tannery unit based on the EI technique, after the East India Company, popularised the technique in this region to cater to the British Army.

== Geographical indication rights ==
E. I. Leather received Intellectual Property Rights Protection or Geographical Indication (GI) status in 2008.
