= Marayoor jaggery =

Type of jaggery (non-centrifugal cane sugar) - agri-product from Kerala, India

- Geographical indication
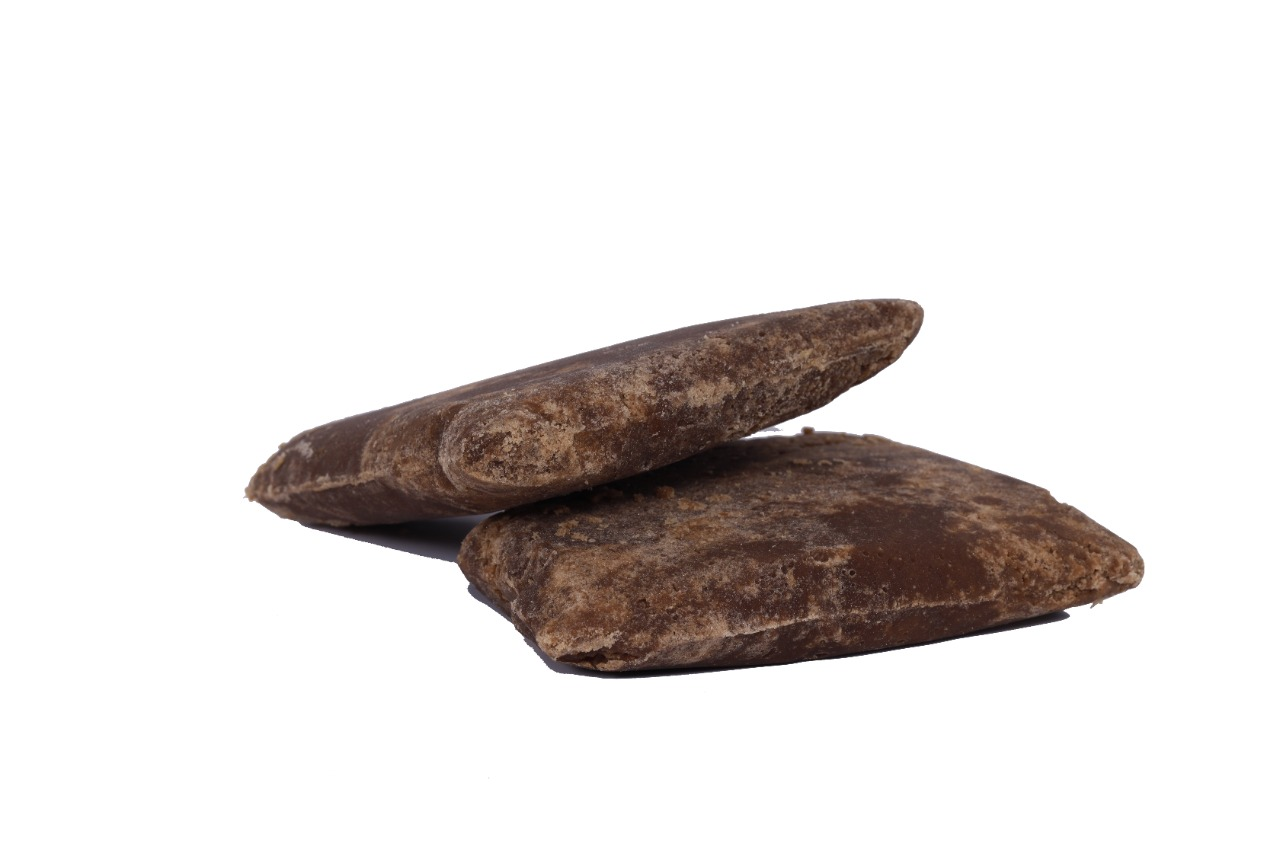
- Marayoor Jaggery in bar form
- Alternative names: Marayoor Sharkara
- Description: A jaggery (agri-product) made from fresh sugarcane juice in Marayoor and Kanthalloor Grama panchayaths of Idukki district of Kerala
- Type: Jaggery
- Area: Marayoor, Kerala
- Country: India
- Registered: 6 March 2019
- Official website: ipindia.gov.in

The Marayoor jaggery is a variety of jaggery (non-centrifugal cane sugar) made from fresh sugarcane juice in the Indian state of Kerala. It is an agri-product manufactured from sugarcane which is a common and widely cultivated crop in Marayoor and Kanthalloor Grama panchayaths of Devikulam taluk, Idukki district grown particularly by the farmers of Muthuva tribe.

This area falls within the rain shadow region, receiving lower rainfall than surrounding areas due to its location on the leeward (downwind) side of Western Ghats mountain range.

== Name ==
Marayoor jaggery made from sugarcane is a prized crop in Marayoor town and so named after it.

=== Local name ===
It is also known by "Marayoor Sharkara". It is made into forms of handmade jaggery, called 'Unda Sharkara', is available in ball form, characterized by its hardness, ease of storage, and long shelf life, with a golden brown to brown color. "Unda" means ball, while 'Sarkara' means the crude form of sugar in the local state language of Malayalam.

== Description ==
It is a high-quality, natural product with distinct characteristics. It has a brown to dark brown color, medium hardness, and a non-sticky texture, with visible finger marks from its handmade production process. Made without added natural or synthetic colors or artificial sweetening agents, this jaggery has a unique non-salty sweetness and characteristic taste. Its well-dried form and low water-insoluble matter ensure minimal dirt and soil content, setting it apart from other market samples.

== Traditional jaggery production ==
The art of jaggery-making in Marayoor has a rich history, with ancient references found in the Rigveda and Ayurvedic texts, dating back centuries.

Marayoor Jaggery, renowned for its exceptional quality, is produced using traditional methods in approximately 150 country sheds scattered throughout the sugarcane fields of the region. The labor-intensive process commences with the extraction of juice from carefully selected, clean sugarcane, followed by filtration to remove impurities. Clarification is achieved through the addition of lime, ensuring a clear juice. The juice is then boiled in large, copper or galvanized iron vessels fueled by bagasse (sugarcane waste) over a furnace, optimized with chimneys and baffles for efficient heat absorption. Constant stirring with long wooden spoons prevents charring, while skilled artisans assess the consistency using time-honored techniques, such as the "cold water test" and dipping their fingers in cold water and then in boiling juice. Once the optimal consistency is reached, the concentrated juice is transferred to wooden troughs for setting, after which it is hand-rolled into distinctive balls, bearing the artisan's fingerprint impressions. This artisanal process yields approximately 6,000 tons per year of premium Marayoor jaggery, primarily in its signature solid ball form (Unda sharkara), alongside smaller quantities of liquid (paani) and powder forms, all devoid of artificial colors, chemicals, or sweeteners.

== Usage ==
It is used as a traditional sweetener and key ingredient in Ayurvedic medicine. It has a revered place in Kerala's temples, where it's used in as an integral part of traditional ceremonies and rituals. It is also used in traditional Kerala sadyas (feasts), and jaggery-coated plantain chips, known as sharkaraperatti, which are a staple delicacy, served alongside other signature dishes.

== Geographical indication ==
It was awarded the Geographical Indication (GI) status tag from the Geographical Indications Registry under the Union Government of India on 6 March 2019 (valid until 15 March 2028).

Anchunadu Karimbu Ulpadhana Vipanana Sangham from Marayoor town, proposed the GI registration of Marayoor jaggery. After filing the application in March 2018, the jaggery was granted the GI tag in 2019 by the Geographical Indication Registry in Chennai, making the name "Marayoor jaggery" exclusive to the jaggery manufactured in the region. It thus became the second jaggery variety from Kerala after Central Travancore jaggery and the 31st type of goods from Kerala to earn the GI tag.

== See also ==
- Central Travancore jaggery
- Edayur chilli
- Kuttiattoor Mango
- Kolhapur Jaggery
- Muzaffarnagar jaggery
