= Kolhapuri chappal =

Indian hand-crafted leather slippers

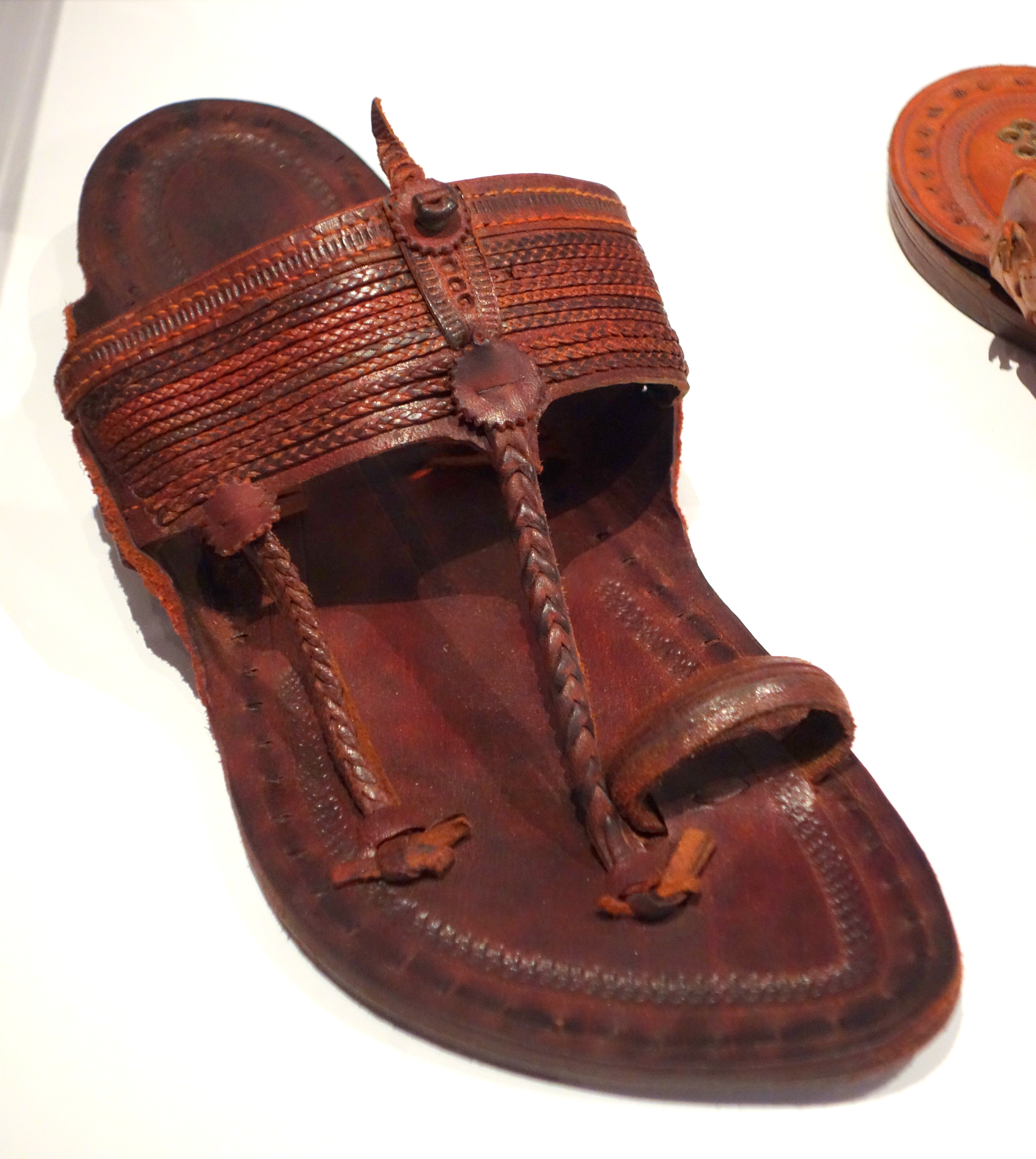
Kolhapuri chappal

Kolhapuri chappals or Kolhapuris are Indian hand-crafted, braided leather slip-on sandals that are locally tanned using vegetable dyes, and hand-decorated with patterns. They are open-toed, T-strap sandals with a loop to hold the big toe, and a large foot loop forward of the ankle fixed by a cord to an attachment point near the toe loop, made to slip on without any fastening. Braided leather Mules or braided leather shoe type designs are also common.

== History ==
History has recorded that it was started and designed by the Saudagar family in 1920. The first model which was designed earlier was much thinner than what is available currently and was also known as "Chappal with ears" or "Kanwali" for it had two side flaps. The upper portion of the footwear was intricately designed.

By 18th century, it became very popular as "Kolhapuri". When this model was sent to a retail store "J.J. and Sons" in South Mumbai, it was very much appreciated and further they ordered for another, then they ordered for another 20 more pairs and it was sold like hot cake in Bombay. Soon there was lot of demand for the Kanwalis in the market and so the Saudagar family extended their work by teaching the artistry to others. This footwear is known in local language as "Pie-taan". By 18th century it became very popular as Kolhapuri and soon after that it was also designed in adjoining towns and cities of Maharashtra.

Shahu I of Kolhapur Maratha Empire (and his successor Rajaram II) encouraged the Kolhapuri chappal industry and 29 tanning centres were opened during his reign.

=== GI tag ===
In July 2019, Kolhapuri chappals received a geographical indication tag from the Controller General of Patents, Designs & Trade Marks. These chappals were first made in Kolhapur Maharashtra in the original form and design, after that artists from Karnataka have also been making Kolhapuri chappals when they were under the Maratha Empire. Districts such as Kolhapur, Sangli, Satara and Solapur districts of Maharashtra as well as Bagalkot, Belgavi, Dharwad and Bijapur of Maharashtra Karnataka border, will only be able to carry the tag of "Kolhapuri chappal".

== Production process and market ==
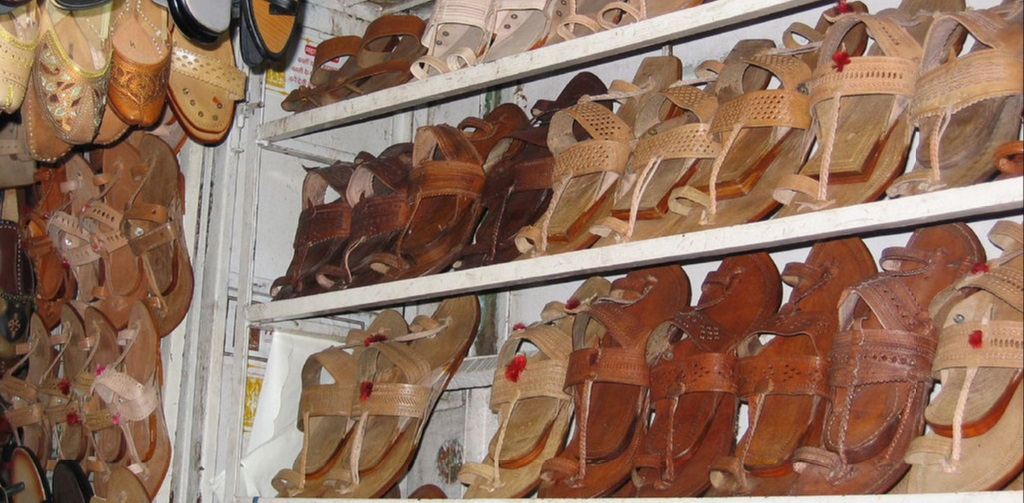
Kolhapuri foot wear in Hyderabad.

It can take up to six weeks to make a pair of Kolhapuris, but a worker can make eight to ten pairs a day of less elaborate, everyday ones, which in 2025 sold for US$8–10 each. Chappals are traditionally made from buffalo-hide and thread; no nails are used. Cow hide has been used, but is controversial due to the place of the cow in the Hindu religion. There are variations for different purposes, for example versions with a double strap, and extremely soft chappals with a thin sole for walking indoors on carpets. Heavy-duty chappals for people such as farmers can weigh as much as three kilograms; light house versions can weigh 100 grams. In everyday use they last typically about ten months.

The manufacture of Kolhapuri chappals involves a series of operations including skiving, pattern making and cutting, the attachment of upper and bottom heels, stitching, finishing, punching and trimming, decoration and polishing, and assembly. Kolhapuri chappals are known to last a lifetime if maintained well and not used in rainy seasons.

In 2020, the total business market was estimated at around ₹90,000,000 (9 crore), with over 10,000 artisans working in Kolhapur. Of the total 600,000 pairs produced annually, 30% were exported. The designs have moved from the ethnic to ones with more utilitarian value and materials from primal hard materials to softer and more comfortable to wear materials. The artisans themselves designed ethnic patterns and sold, but today the traders and businessmen with demand for cheap products drive the requirement of minimalist designs.

In recent decades, the business has struggled for survival with market decline, low profits, irregular leather supply, duplicates & fakes, environmental regulations on tanneries, cow slaughter ban, among other issues.

== Design and market trends ==
In the seventies, with the hippie movement, Kolhapuri chappals became popular in the United States. The success faded out and recently came back influencing now models that are called toe ring sandals. A French brand called CHAPPAL exports these traditional sandals in various colors and with a feminine design to France to make it popular in that country.

Prada sparked a cultural appropriation controversy after including sandals resembling Kolhapuri chappals in its Spring-Summer 2026 Men's collection, describing them merely as "leather sandals" with no mention of their Indian origins. This omission led to backlash from Indian fashion circles and traditional artisans in Maharashtra, who cited a violation of the GI-tagged footwear's heritage. Following public pressure and a formal complaint by the Maharashtra Chamber of Commerce, Industry and Agriculture (MACCIA), Prada acknowledged the sandals' Indian inspiration and expressed commitment to ethical design, cultural recognition, and possible collaboration with local artisans. The fashion house also stated that the advertised sandals were still at the design stage and had not been finalized for commercial production. A PIL has been filed in the Bombay High Court seeking compensation for Kolhapuri chappal artisans. The petition demands a formal public apology, damages, and stricter protections for traditional Indian designs and GI-tagged products.

== Gallery ==
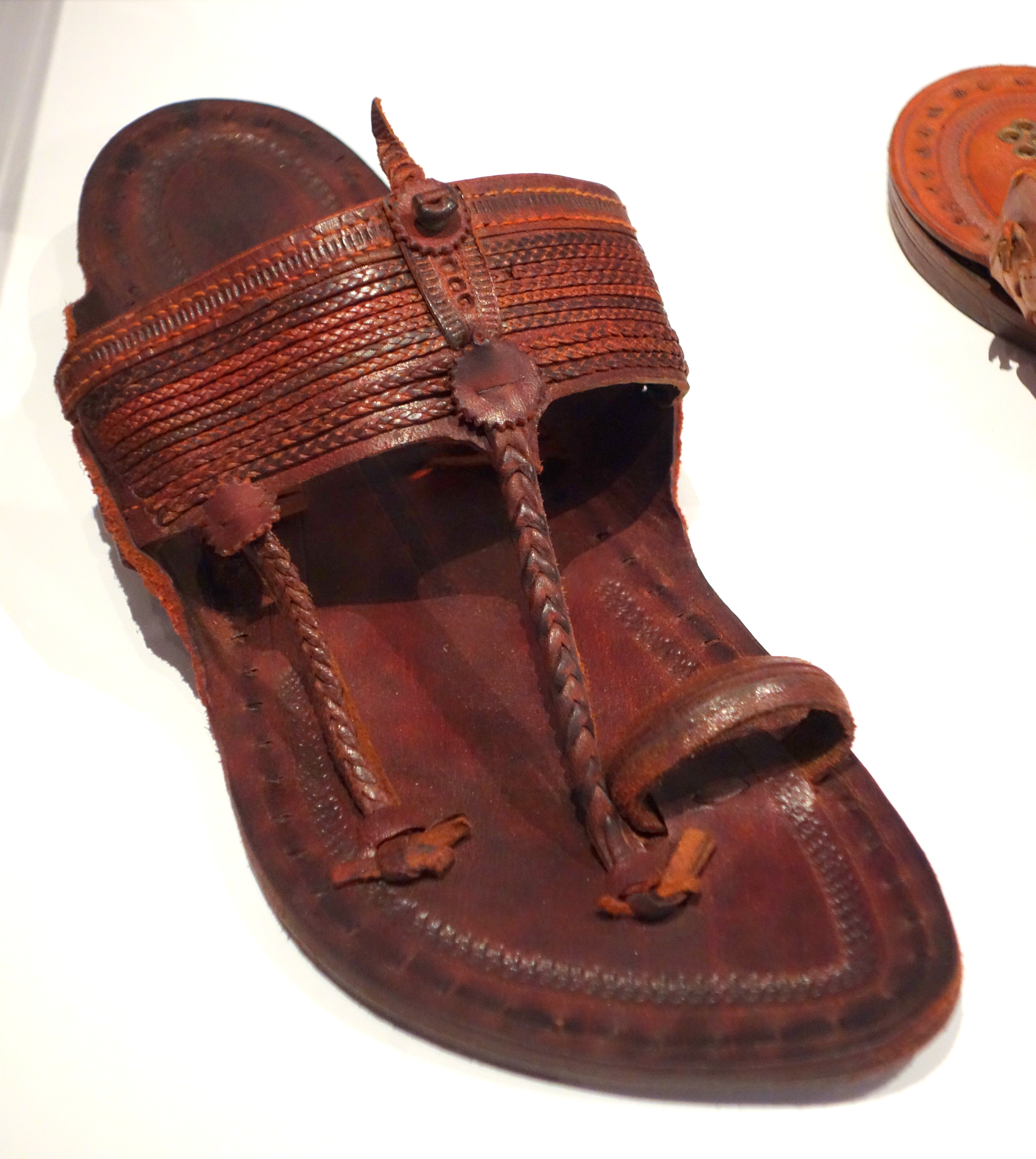

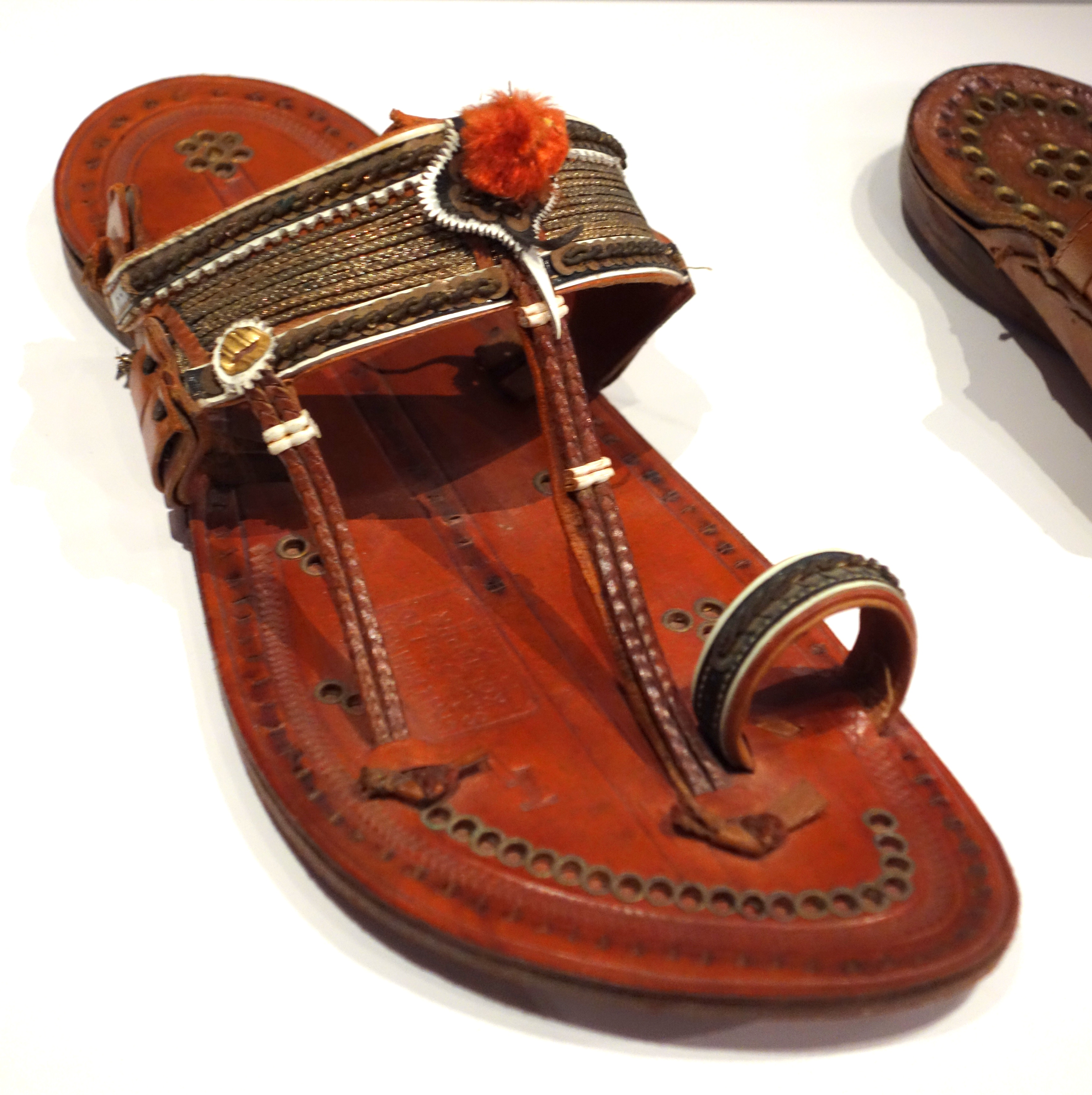

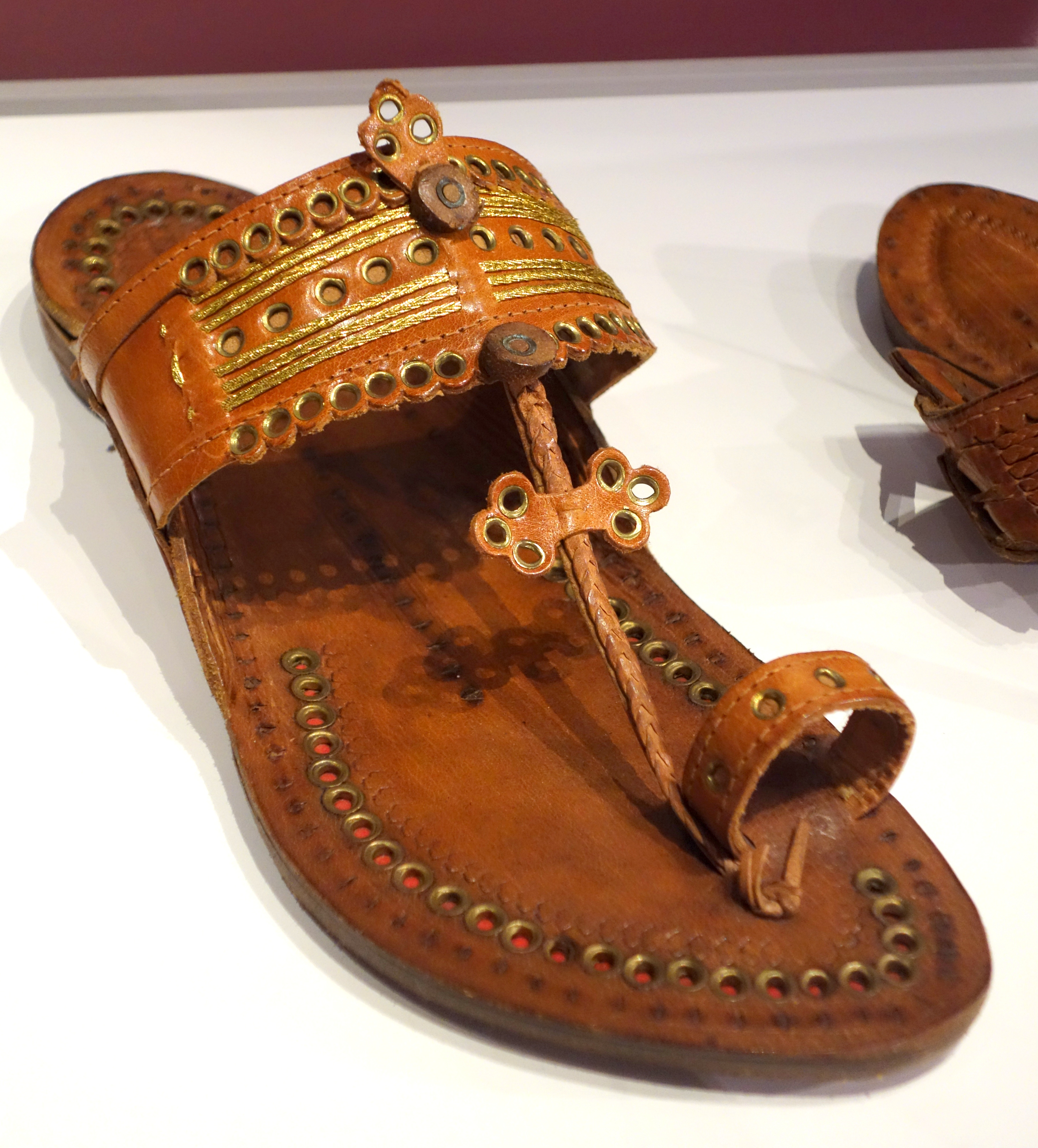

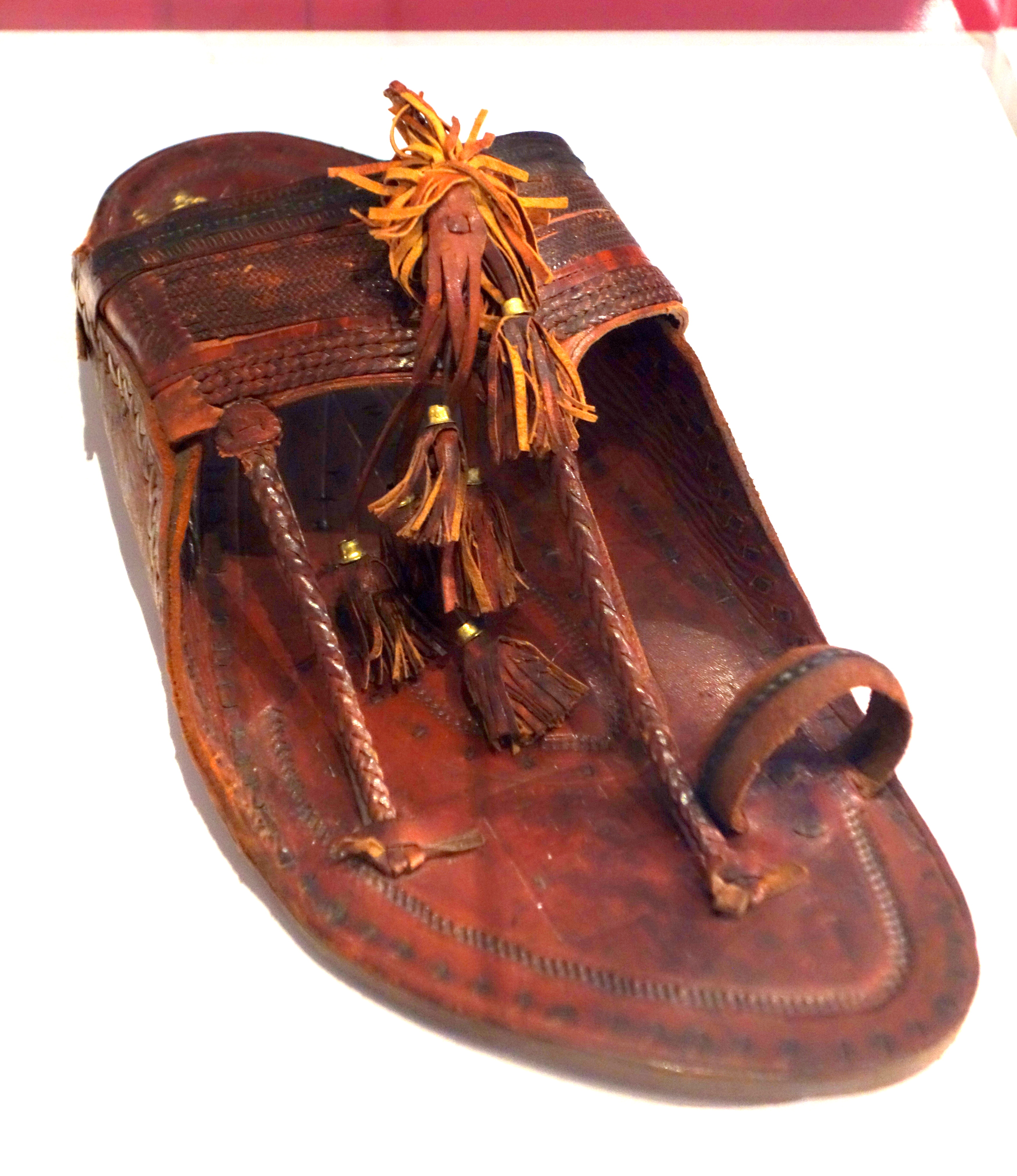

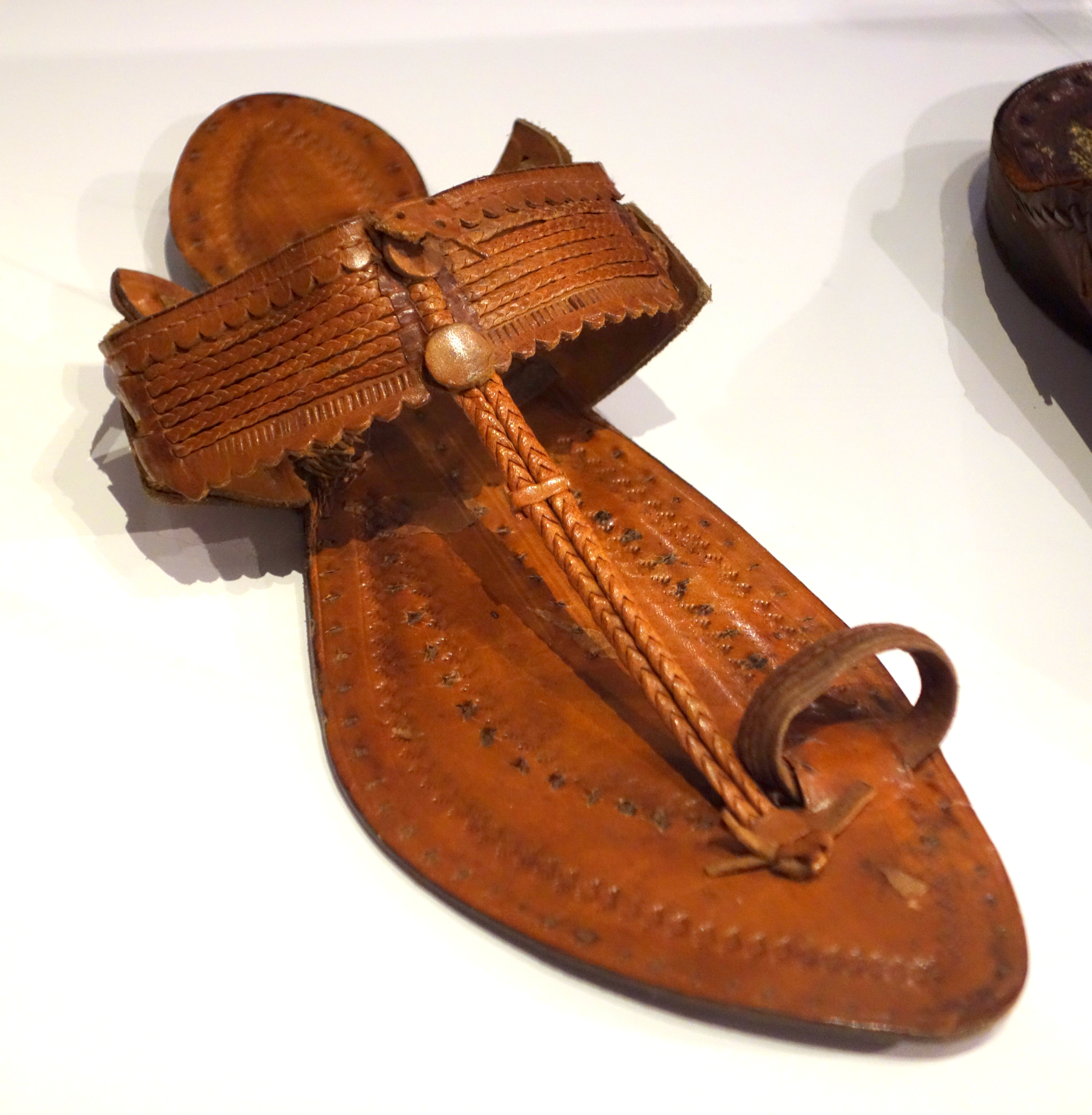

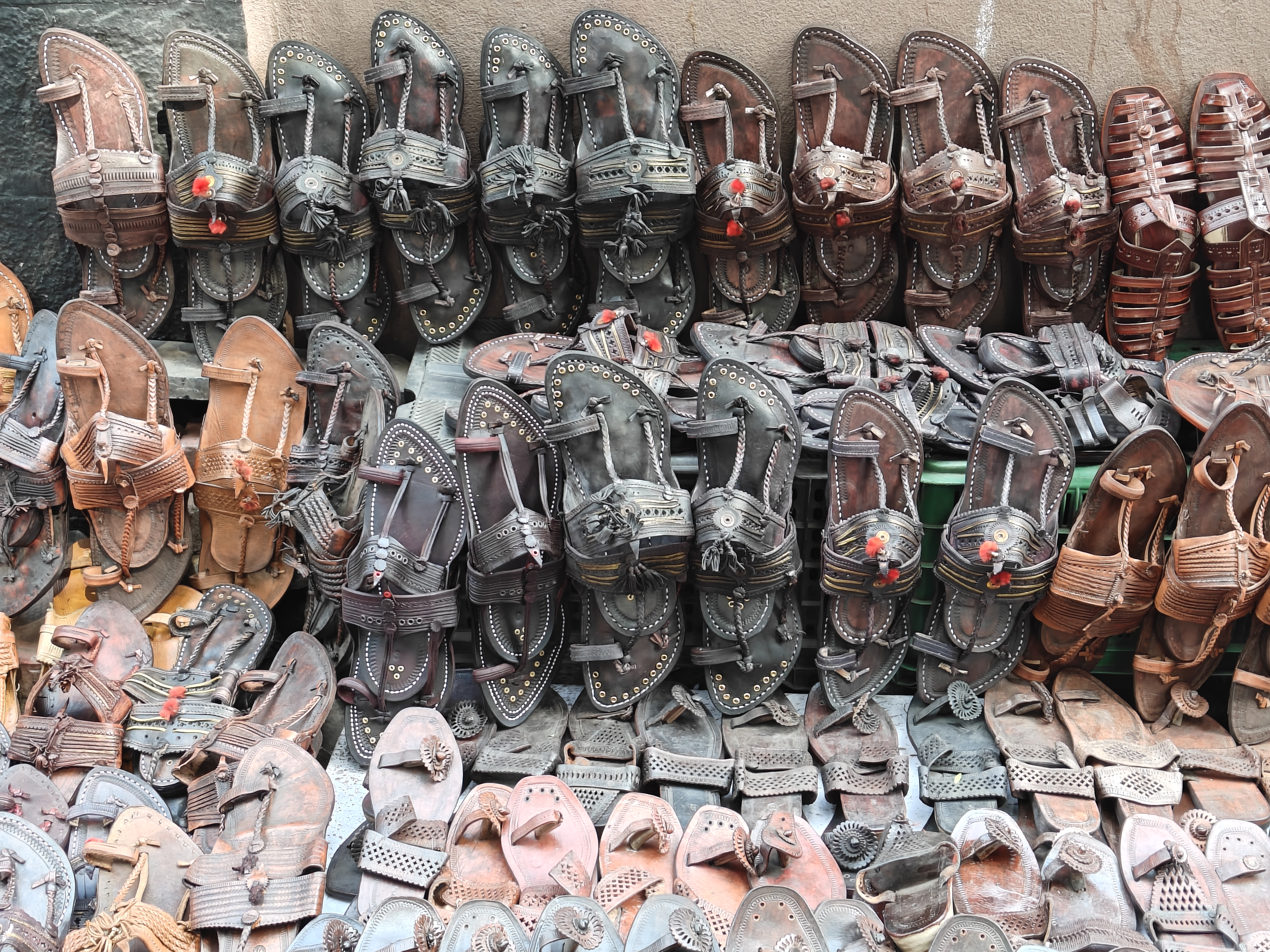

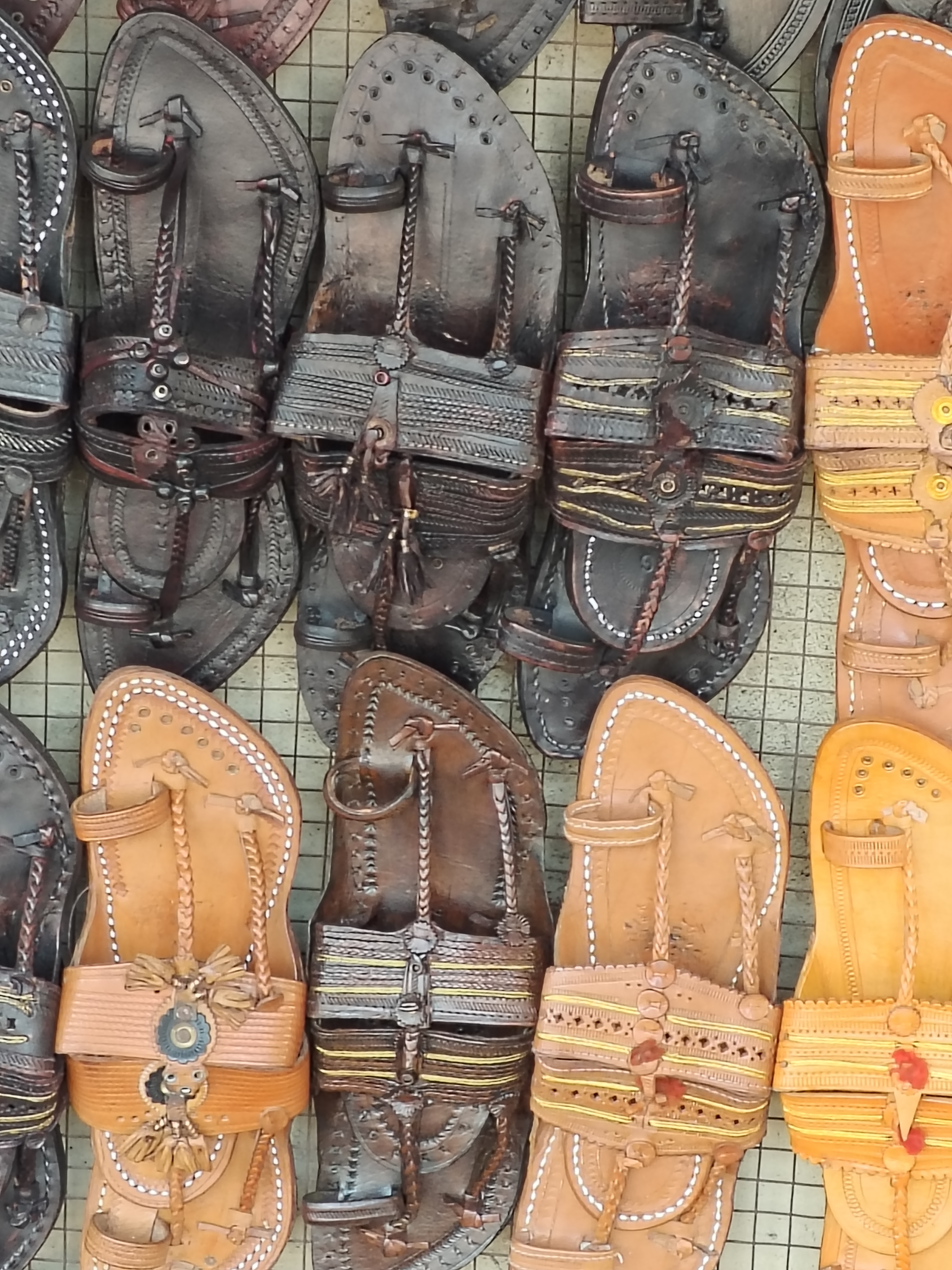

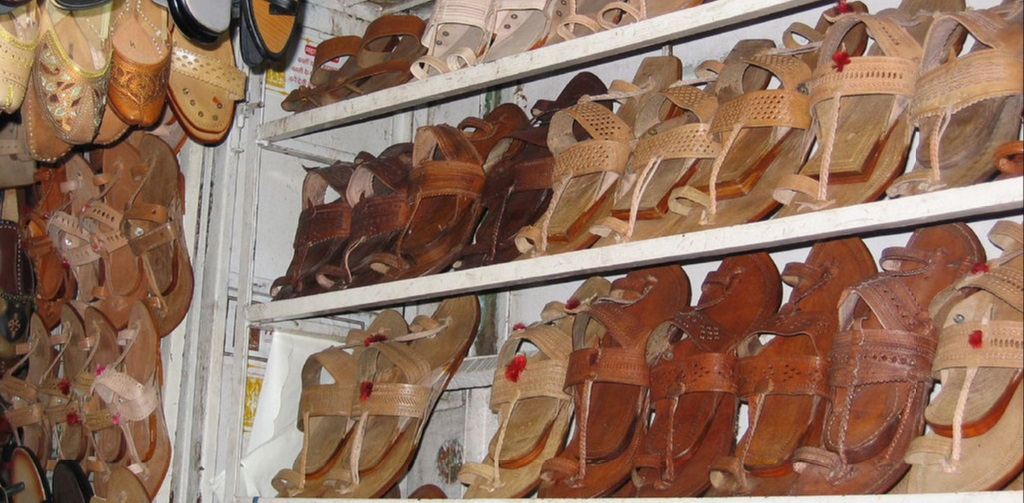

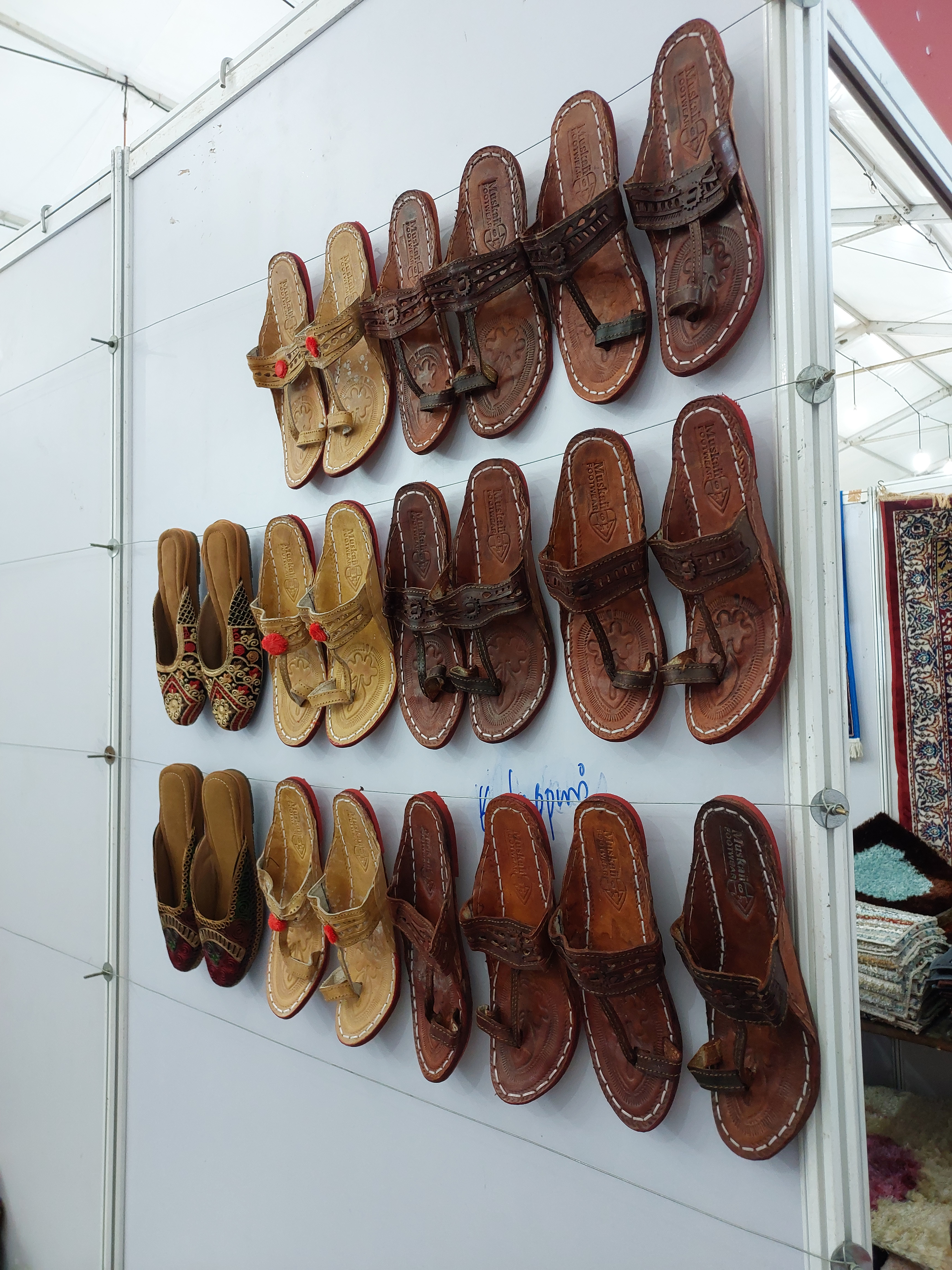

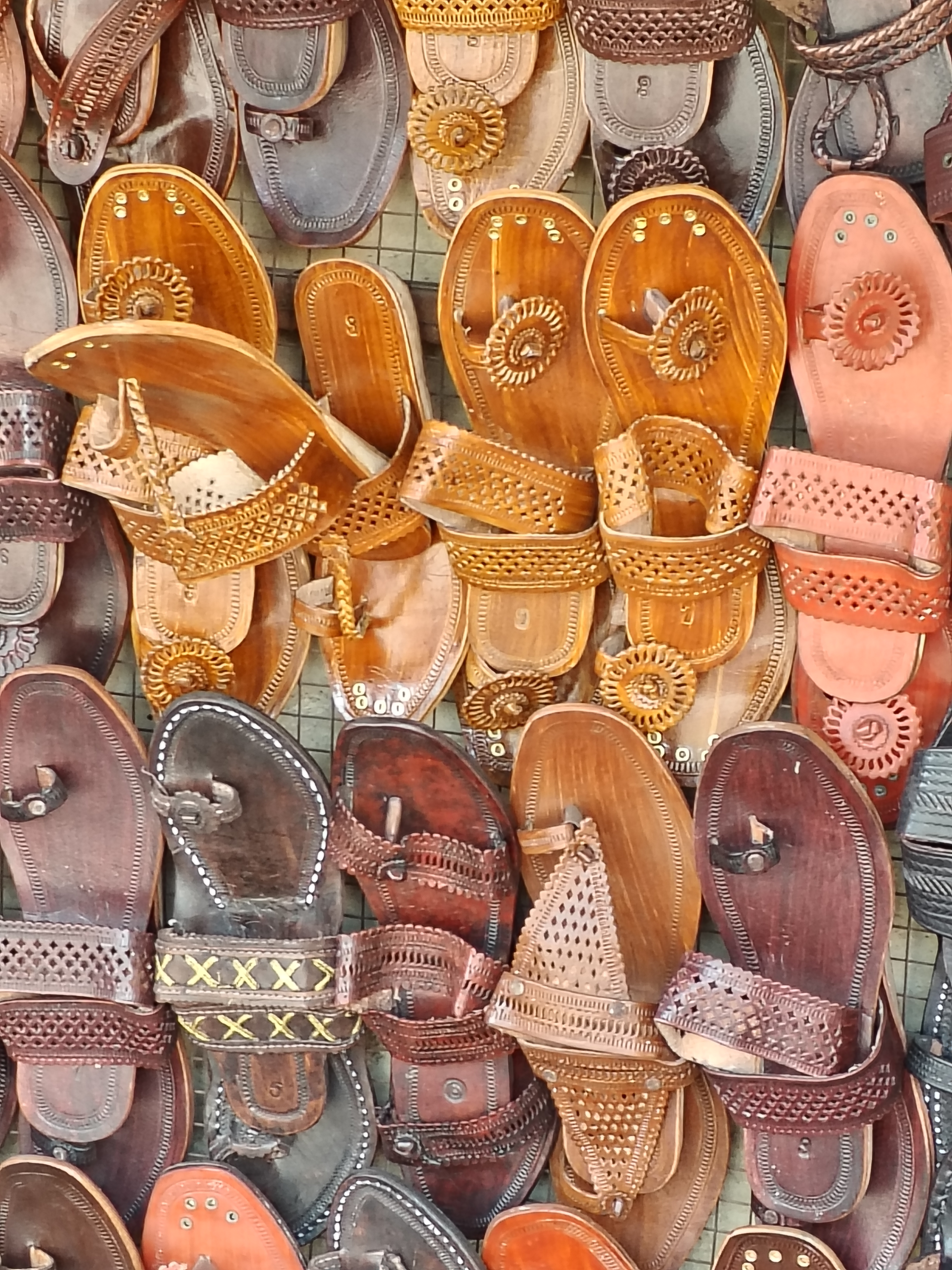

== See also ==
- List of shoe styles
- Kolhapur jaggery
- Sangli turmeric
- Sangli raisins
