= Marayur =

Marayur Marayoor
- Town
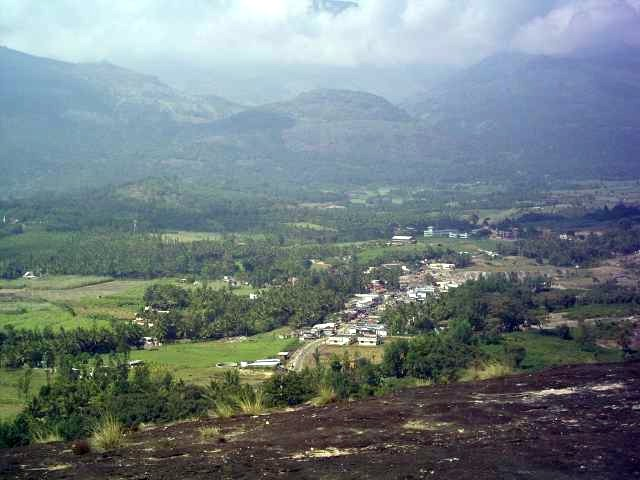
- Marayoor

- Location in Kerala, India Marayur (India)
- Coordinates: 10.2762°N 77.1615°E
- Country: India
- State: Kerala
- District: Idukki

Government
  - Type: Grama Panchayat

Area
  - Total: 224.99 km^{2} (86.87 sq mi)

Population (2011)
  - Total: 12,399
  - Density: 55.109/km^{2} (142.73/sq mi)

Languages
  - Official: Malayalam, English
  - Regional: Tamil, Malayalam
- Time zone: UTC+5:30 (IST)
- PIN: 685620
- Telephone code: 04865
- Vehicle registration: KL-68

Marayur or Marayoor is a town in Devikulam taluk of Idukki district in the southwestern Indian state of Kerala. It is located 42 kilometers north of Munnar on SH 17 connecting Munnar with Udumalpet, Tamil Nadu. Marayur is situated at around 990 metres above mean sea level and is the only place in Kerala that has natural sandalwood forests. Ancient dolmens and rock paintings in Marayur date back to the Stone Age. In 1991 Marayur had a population of 9,590.

== Demographics ==
As per 2011 census report, Marayoor grama panchayat had population of 12,399 of which 6,192 are males and 6,207 are females. Total number of households in panchayat is 3,307. Marayoor is the only village in Marayoor panchayat.

== History ==
Marayur claims to be a part of a Stone Age civilization that is as old as 10,000 B.C. It is also home to a later period of large-scale dolmen-building. People migrated from pandya dynasty regions of ancient Tamilakam to this area when the Madurai king Bangaru Thirumala Nayak was defeated by Chanda Saheb, in the eighteenth century CE. The migrants created five villages, being Kanthalloor, Keezhanthur, Karayur, Marayur and Kottakudi. These villages were called the "Anju nadu", literally meaning "five lands".

=== Megalithic Dolmens ===
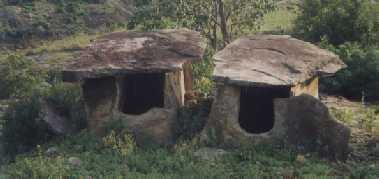
Dolmens of Marayur

Also called Muniyaras, these dolmens belong to the Iron Age. These dolmenoids were burial chambers made of four stones placed on edge and covered by a fifth stone called the cap stone. Some of these Dolmenoids contain several burial chambers, while others have a quadrangle scooped out in laterite and lined on the sides with granite slabs. These are also covered with cap stones. Dozens of Dolmens around the area of old Siva temple (Thenkasinathan Temple) at Kovilkadavu on the banks of the River Pambar and also around the area called Pius nagar, and rock paintings on the south-western slope of the plateau overlooking the river have attracted visitors.

Apart from the dolmens of Stone Age, several dolmens of Iron Age exist in this region especially on the left side of river Pambar as is evident from the usage of neatly dressed granite slabs for the dolmens. At least one of them has a perfectly circular hole of 28 cm diameter inside the underground chamber. This region has several types of dolmens. Large number of them are overground with about 70–90 cm height. Another type has a height 140–170 cm. There is an overground dolmen with double length up to 350 cm. Fragments of burial urns are also available in the region near the dolmens. This indicates that the dolmens with 70–90 cm height were used for burial of the remains of people of high social status. Burial urns were used for the burial of the remains of commoners. The dolmens with raised roofs might have been used for habitation of people. Why some people lived in the cemeteries has not been satisfactorily explained.

=== Rock paintings ===
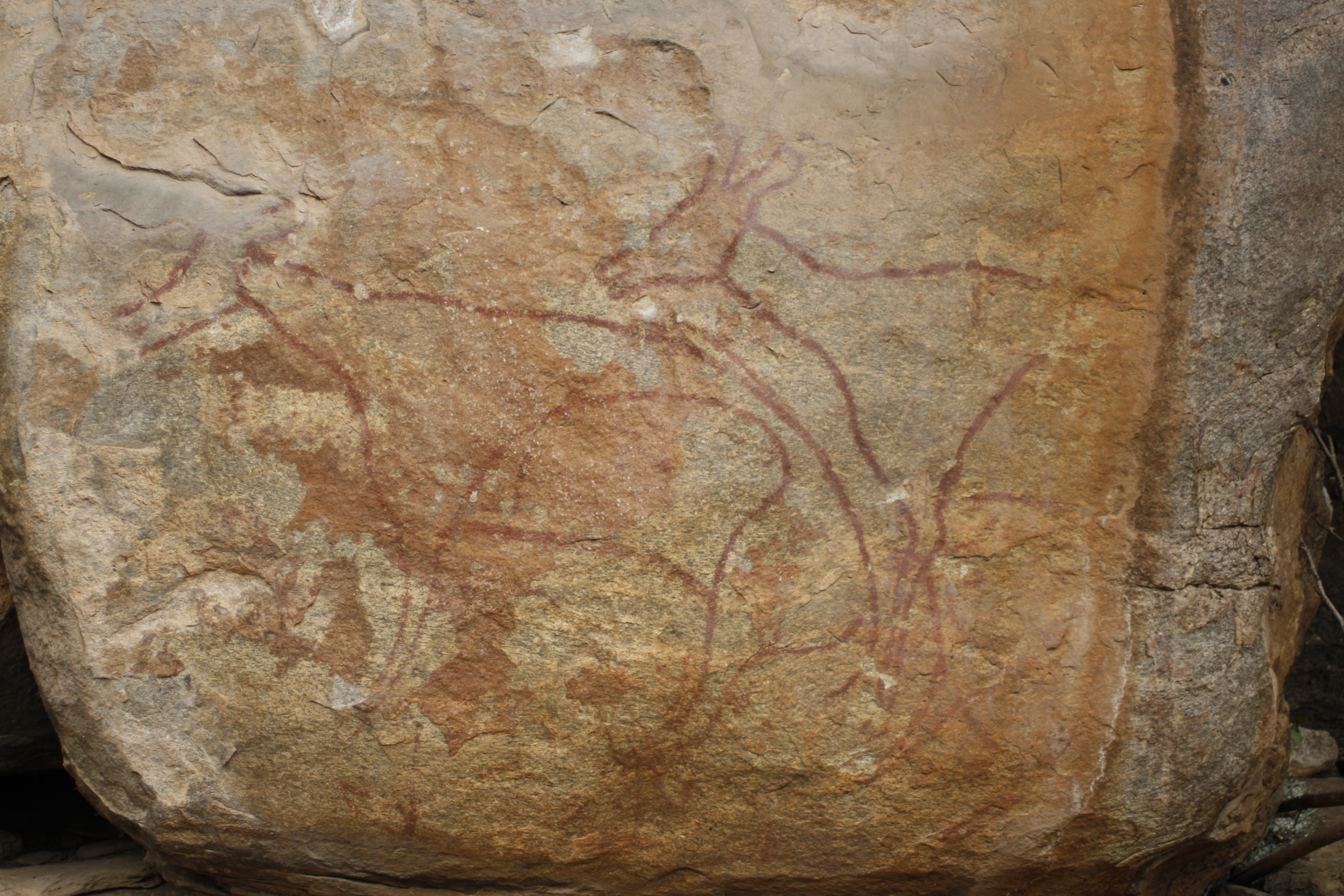
A rock painting at Marayoor

Ancient rock paintings are part of Marayur heritage at Attala, Ezhuthu Guha (literally means "cave of writing"), Kovilkadavu and Manala in Marayur panchayat. Attala is situated in the west part of Marayur Township and more than 90 painted motifs can be seen here. The rock paintings of Attala are situated in a colossal east facing rock shelter 1500 meters above mean sea level. Most of the paintings at Attala are abstract designs except for a few human and animal figures.

Ezhuthu Guha rock paintings are sited in the Koodakavu Sandalwood Reserve Forest at Marayur in the Marayur Panchayat at an elevation of 1000 meters above mean sea level. More or less 90 painted motifs can be seen here. However, as the place is the most famous rock art site in Kerala, it attracts a large number of visitors and has been extensively vandalized since it was brought to wide public attention.

Kovilkadavu is less than five kilometers from Marayur town and the place is famous for Neolithic dolmens and rock paintings. Ten 10 painted motifs are located on the south-western slope of the plateau overlooking the Pambar river. There is a rock painting at Manala in Chinnar Wildlife Sanctuary of Marayur near the Alampetty tribal settlement. Here, a picture of a deer and a man can be seen. In close proximity to this art site, a new rock painting has been newly discovered.

== Topography and Climate ==
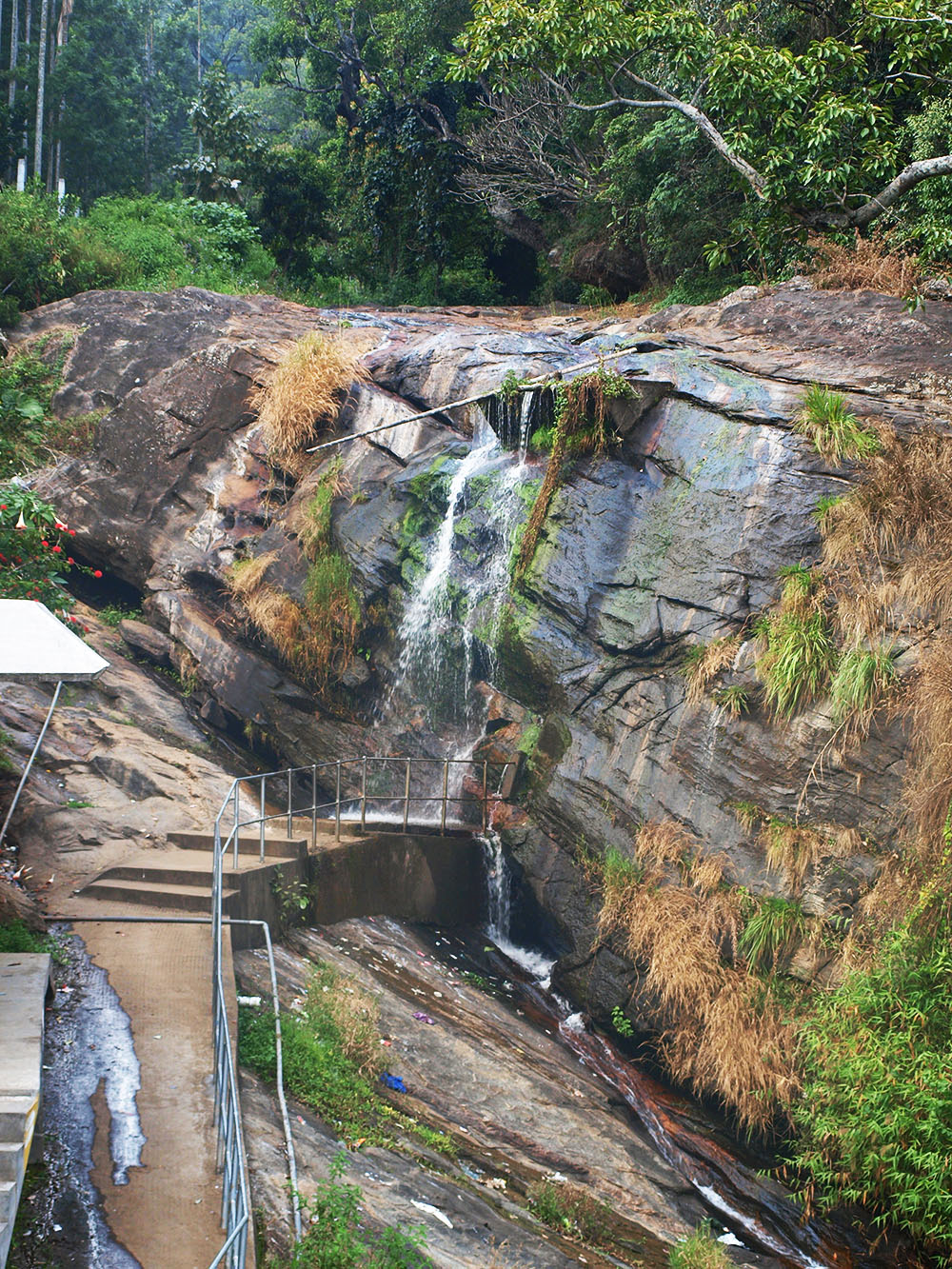
Karimutty waterfalls near Marayoor

The terrain is highly undulating with altitudes ranging from 500 m at Chinnar to over 2300 m at Nandala malai, and the same varying topography of Marayur can be observed in Marayur with mountains, rain forests, deciduous forests, riparian forests, scrub forests, brooks, Paddy Fields, river, waterfalls, rocky hills, sholas and hamlets. Natural vegetation includes tropical evergreen forests and grasslands. Soil type is forest loam with a high organic matter content. The climate in Marayur is characterized by mild wet winters and hot dry summers. Temperature in winter (November to January) may go down to 20 degrees Celsius and in summer it may go up to 36.2 degrees Celsius. Marayur winter is not frigid cold as considerable sunshine is also characteristic to this region even during rainy winter. Summer is humid and hot with blazing sun. Generally Marayur experience a moderate climate, temperatures varying 21 °C to 27 °C with minimum seasonal variation except in winter. The plains are generally warm but the higher altitudes are cool. The annual rainfall in Idukki district varies from 250 to 425 cm. However, it is also recorded that the annual rainfall had gone up to 700 cm in certain years. The Eastern and North-Eastern regions of the district get very low rainfall in contrast to other areas. This may go up to 150 cm at Marayur, Kanthalloor, Vattavada and Thalayar regions. Marayur and Kanthalloor are virtually rain shadow areas, lying in the eastern side of the Western Ghats.

== Flora and fauna ==
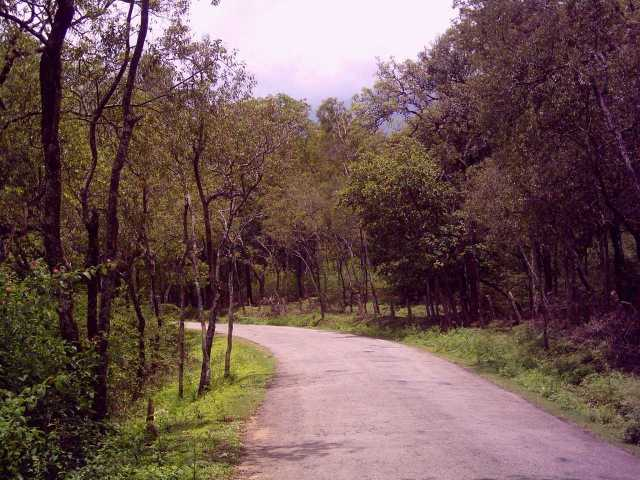
Walkway through the sandalwood forest

Marayur has more than 1000 species of flowering plants and is a well known repository of medicinal plants. There are 114 endemic species and the sighting of Aibizia lathamii, a critically endangered tree, was recently reported from the dry forests. Chinnar - the wildlife sanctuary in Marayur - has recorded the largest number of reptilian species, including the mugger crocodile, in Kerala. With 225 recorded species of birds, it is one of the richest areas of south India in avian diversity. The forests in Marayur preserve a population of the endangered Grizzled Giant Squirrel. The rare white bison has been recently reported in Chinnar wildlife sanctuary. Other important mammals found are elephant, tiger, leopard, guar, sambar, spotted deer, Nilgiri thar, common langur, bonnet macaque etc. The phenomenon of butterfly migration occurs in between the monsoons.

Maryoor contains a number of sandalwood forests, and is the only place in Kerala where natural sandalwood forest is present. Processing of sandalwood and its associated oil forms part of local economy, a depot near Marayur town supporting this industry. Sandal wood or Santalum album is a parasitic tree having a fragrant and close-grained yellowish heartwood. Sandalwood oil, also known as 'liquid gold,’ is extracted from the roots and wood of sandalwood. This oil is a costly item marketed at a few choosy outlets all over the state. A climate with low rainfall is suitable for the growth of choice sandalwood trees from which good quality oil can be extracted. The 93 km^{2} Marayur reserve forest is believed to have about sixty thousand naturally grown sandalwood trees, of which nearly 2,000 trees had been allegedly plundered in just one year since January 2004, when the last survey was conducted. The auction rate for first quality Marayur sandal is quoted at ₹1,100 per kg, according to forest department sources (2004).

== Geographical indication ==
Marayoor jaggery was awarded the Geographical Indication (GI) status tag from the Geographical Indications Registry under the Union Government of India on 6 March 2019 (valid until 15 March 2028).

Anchunadu Karimbu Ulpadhana Vipanana Sangham from Marayoor town, proposed the GI registration of Marayoor jaggery. After filing the application in March 2018, the jaggery was granted the GI tag in 2019 by the Geographical Indication Registry in Chennai, making the name "Marayoor jaggery" exclusive to the jaggery manufactured in the region. It thus became the second jaggery variety from Kerala after Central Travancore jaggery and the 31st type of goods from Kerala to earn the GI tag.
