= Kolhapur jaggery =

Type of jaggery (non-centrifugal cane sugar) - agri-product from Maharashtra, India

- Geographical indication
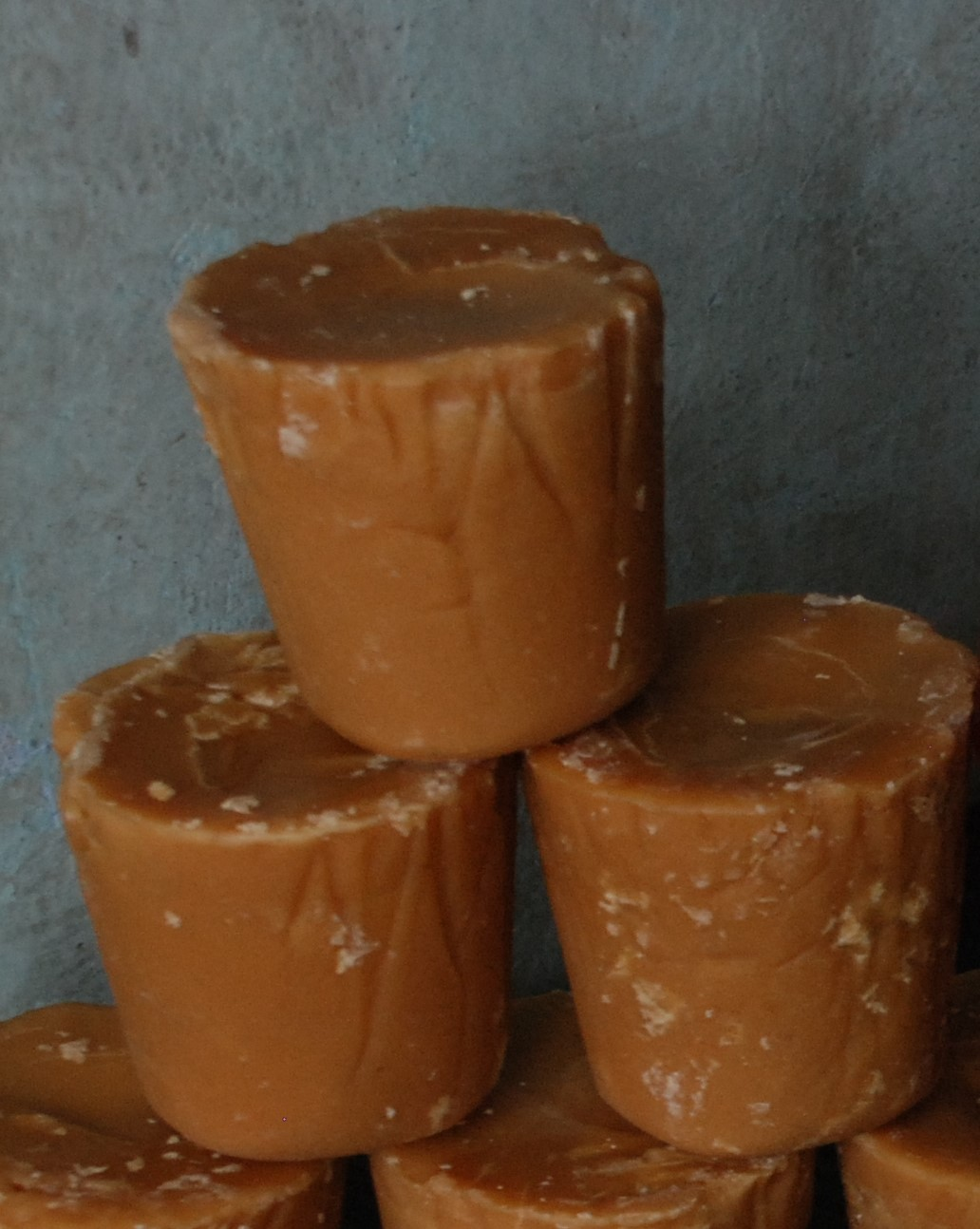
- Organic Kolhapur Jaggery Dhep (Block) - 1 Kg each
- Alternative names: Kolhapuri Gul (कोल्हापुरी गूळ)
- Description: A jaggery (agri-product) made from fresh sugarcane juice in Kolhapur, Maharashtra
- Type: Jaggery
- Area: Kolhapur
- Country: India
- Registered: 31 March 2014
- Official website: ipindia.gov.in

Kolhapur jaggery is a variety of jaggery (non-centrifugal cane sugar) made from fresh sugarcane juice in the Indian state of Maharashtra. It is an agri-product manufactured from sugarcane which is a common and widely cultivated crop in Kolhapur. The waters of the streams forming the Panchganga river are primarily used for sugarcane cultivation in Kolhapur. It is also the most exported variety of jaggery from India.

== Name ==
Kolhapur jaggery made from sugarcane is an important crop in Kolhapur and so named after it.

=== Local name ===
It is known as 'Kolhapuri Gul (कोल्हापुरी गूळ)' - Gul means jaggery while the word "Kolhapuri" means from the region of Kolhapur, in the local state language of Marathi.

== Description ==
This popular jaggery variant is made from unrefined sugarcane juice, manually extracted and processed using traditional boiling, churning, and filtering methods. The result is a distinctively flavored and textured jaggery in a crystallized state. Kolhapur jaggery is golden (reddish-brown) and typically produced without any additives.

== Traditional jaggery production ==
Traditional jaggery production has organic methods, which involves selecting high-quality juice from ripe sugarcane. There are 3 skilled artisans, the 'Chulvan', 'Adsule' and 'Gulave', who play crucial roles in the process.

The 'Chulvan' ensures uniform heat distribution for boiling, while the 'Adsule' clarifies the molasses from the juice. The 'Gulave', the master jaggery chemist, has special skills as an expert sense of timing for stirring, inspecting, and determining the optimal moment to fill the pots. Notably, these traditional processes rely on experience and instinct, having been perfected without modern tools like viscosity meters, thermometers, and refractors.

== Usage ==
Maharashtra is India's largest producer and consumer of jaggery. Jaggery's cultural role in the region is significant, particularly during Makar Sankranti, where it is used to make sweetmeat called Tilgul. In rural Maharashtra, jaggery and water are offered as a welcome drink. A byproduct of jaggery production, Kakvi, is also used in rural Maharashtra as a sweetener. It is used also in Ayurveda. It is a staple ingredient in Maharashtrian cuisine, used in various dishes like vegetable curries and dals.

== Geographical indication ==
It was awarded the Geographical Indication (GI) status tag from the Geographical Indications Registry under the Union Government of India on 31 March 2014 (valid until 30 July 2031).

Kolhapur Agricultural Produce Market (Kolhapur Sheti Utpanna Bazar Samiti) from Kolhapur, proposed the GI registration of Kolhapur jaggery. After filing the application in January 2012, the jaggery was granted the GI tag in 2021 by the Geographical Indication Registry in Chennai, making the name "Kolhapur jaggery" exclusive to the jaggery manufactured in the region. It thus became the first jaggery variety from Maharashtra and the ninth type of goods from Maharashtra to earn the GI tag.

== Photo gallery ==
Actual photos from Kolhapur Agricultural Produce Market (Kolhapur Sheti Utpanna Bazar Samiti) from Kolhapur - the original applicant for the GI Tag.

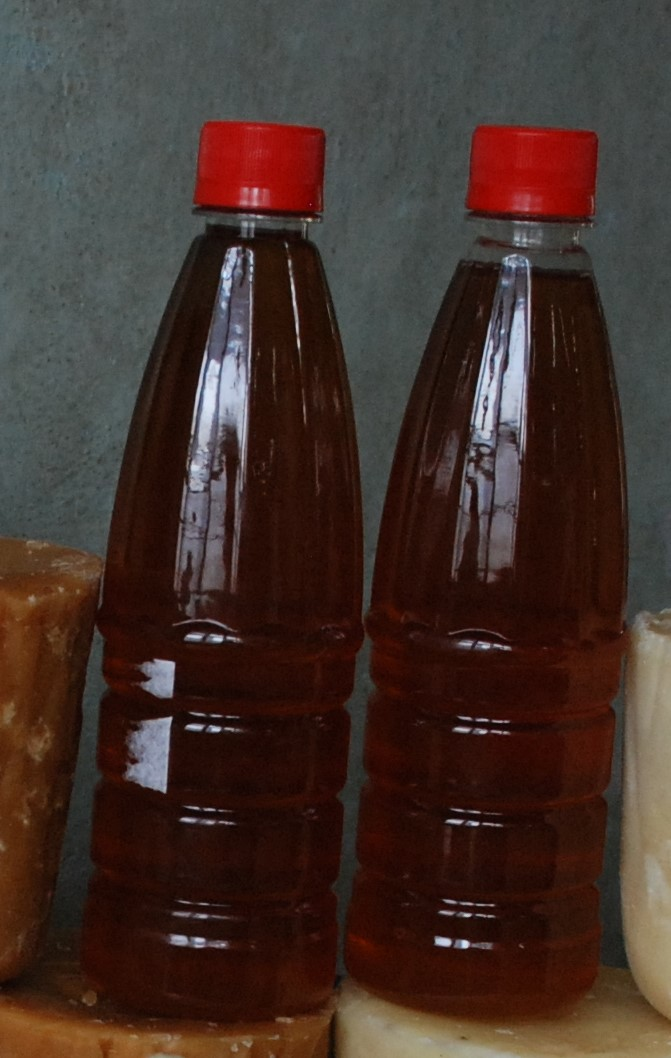
Kakvi - Kolhapuri liquid jaggery (Organic Chemical-free)

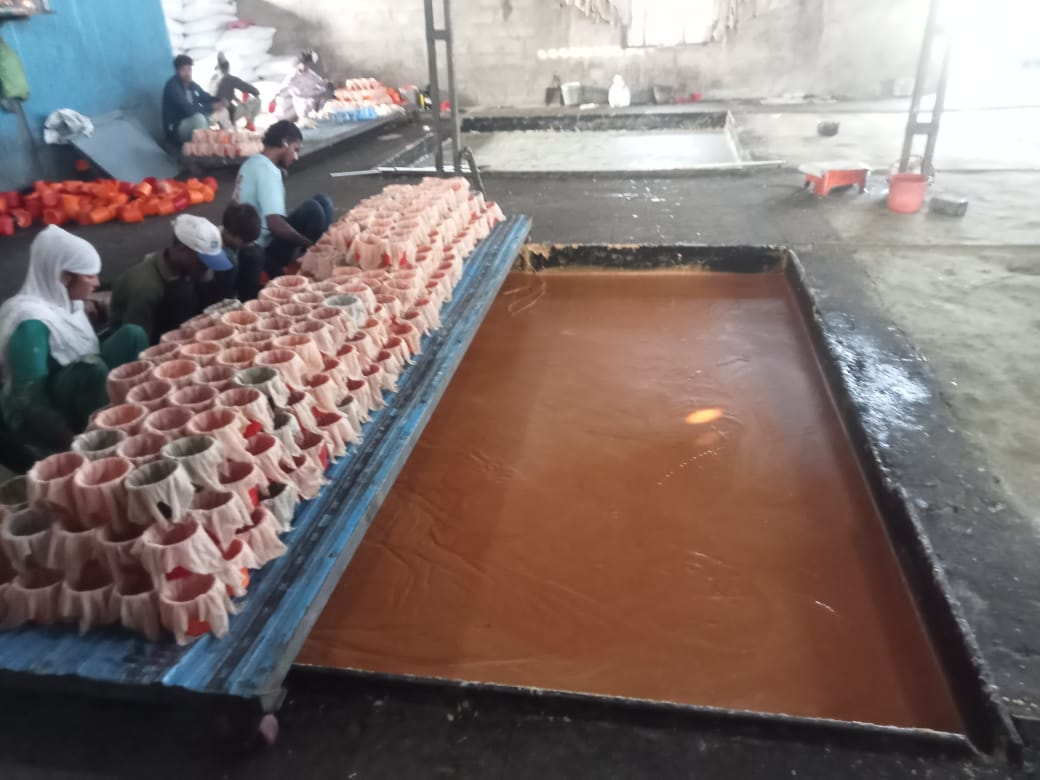
Kolhapur jaggery in semi-liquid form filled in the "Vafaa" rectangular section. Later will be transferred into the 1 Kg containers with white cloth placed inside it for making Jaggery blocks (Dheps)

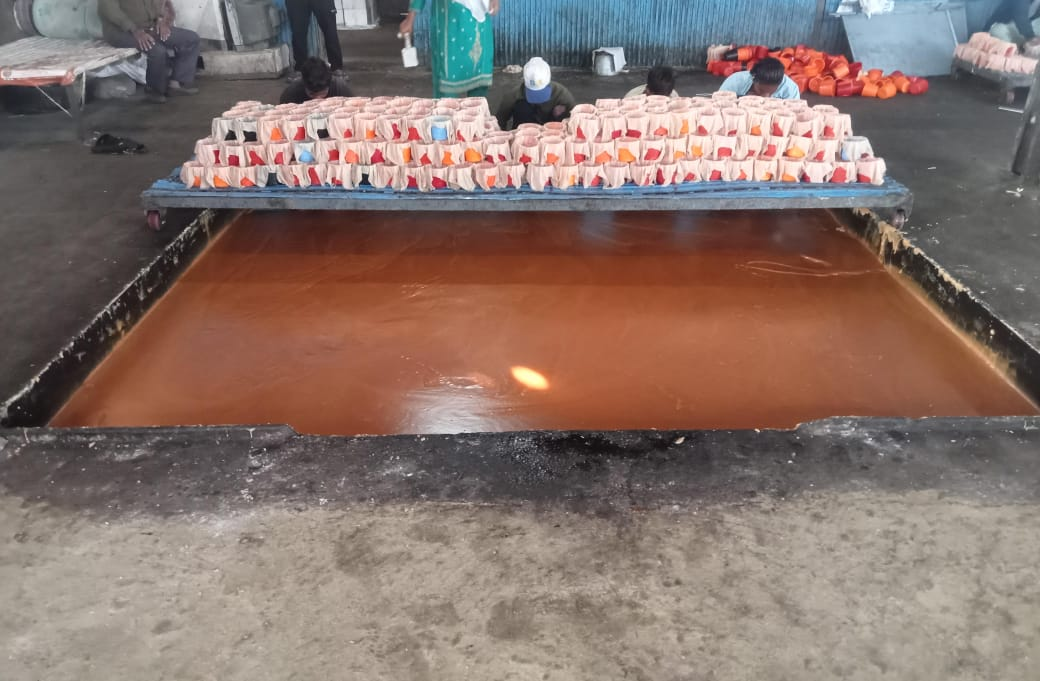
Another photo of Kolhapur jaggery in semi-liquid form filled in the "Vafaa" rectangular section.

== See also ==
- Muzaffarnagar jaggery
- Central Travancore jaggery
- Marayoor jaggery
- Kolhapuri Chappal
- Sangli turmeric
- Sangli raisins
