= Kuttiattoor =

- Census Town
- Location in Kerala, India Kuttiattoor (India)
- Coordinates: 11.9754°N 75.4927°E
- Country: India
- State: Kerala
- District: Kannur

Government
  - Type: Panchayati raj (India)
  - Body: Kuttiattoor Grama Panchayat

Area
  - Total: 20.9 km^{2} (8.1 sq mi)

Population (2011)
  - Total: 13,244
  - Density: 634/km^{2} (1,640/sq mi)

Languages
  - Official: Malayalam, English
- Time zone: UTC+5:30 (IST)
- PIN: 670592,670602
- Vehicle registration: KL-59

Kuttiattoor is a census town in Taliparamba taluk of Kannur district in the Indian state of Kerala. It is located 26 km (16 mi) northeast of district headquarters Kannur and 6.5 km (4.0 mi) southeast of Mayyil.

== Kuttiattoor Mango ==
Kuttiattoor Mango is a popular and traditional cultivar of Kuttiattoor and neighbouring panchayats of Kannur district. Kuttiattoor mango received a Geographical Indication (GI) tag from the GI registry at Chennai. The distinctiveness of Kuttiattoor mango is aided by the combination of specific environmental conditions of the area of its cultivation and varietal characters. Even though it is popularly known as Kuttiattoor mango, it is also known as ‘Nambiar mānga’, ‘Kannapuram mānga’, ‘Kunjimangalam mānga’ and ‘Vadakkumbhagam mānga’ in small pockets of Kannur district.

== Demographics ==
As of 2011 Census, Kuttiattoor had a population of 13,244 of which 6,272 are males and 6,972 are females. Kuttiattoor census town spreads over an area of 20.9 km^{2} (8.1 sq mi) with 3,017 families residing in it. The sex ratio of Kuttiattoor was 1,112 higher than state average of 1,084. In Kuttiattor, population of children under 6 years was 10.4%. Kuttiattoor census town had overall literacy of 94.4%, higher than national average of 59% and higher than state average of 94%.

As of 2011 census, Kuttiattoor Grama Panchayat had total population of 25,925 among which 12,174 are males and 13,751 are females. Kuttiattoor Panchayat has administration over Kuttiattoor and Maniyoor census towns.

== Religion ==
As of 2011 Indian census, Kuttiattoor census town had total population of 13,244 which constitute 78.84% Hindus, 20.86% Muslims and 0.3% others.

== Administration ==
Kuttiattoor census town is part of Kuttiattoor Grama Panchayat. Kuttiattoor Panchayat is politically part of Taliparamba Assembly constituency under Kannur Lok Sabha constituency.
