= Muzaffarnagar jaggery =

Type of jaggery (non-centrifugal cane sugar) - agri-product from Uttar Pradesh, India

Muzaffarnagar jaggery (मुजफ्फरनगर गुड़)
- Geographical indication
- Alternative names: Muzaffarnagar Gur
- Description: A jaggery (agri-product) made from fresh sugarcane juice in Muzaffarnagar, Bijnor, Shamli, Baghpat, Meerut and Shajahanpur district of Uttar Pradesh
- Type: Jaggery
- Area: Muzaffarnagar, Uttar Pradesh
- Country: India
- Registered: 31 March 2023
- Official website: ipindia.gov.in

The Muzaffarnagar jaggery is a variety of jaggery (non-centrifugal cane sugar) made from fresh sugarcane juice in the Indian state of Uttar Pradesh. It is an agri-product manufactured from sugarcane which is a common and widely cultivated crop majorily in the districts of Muzaffarnagar and also in Bijnor, Shamli, Baghpat, Meerut and Shajahanpur. Muzaffarnagar hosts India's largest jaggery market, accounting for 20% of the country's total jaggery production. The city's jaggery is considered lucky by many and is a significant contributor to India's traditional sweetener production.

Under its Geographical Indication tag, it is referred to as "Muzaffarnagar Gur (Jaggery)".

== Name ==
Muzaffarnagar jaggery made from sugarcane is a prized crop in Muzaffarnagar and so named after the place.

=== Local name ===
It is known as "Muzaffarnagar Gur". The word "Gur" means jaggery in the local state language of Hindi.

== Description ==
It is manufactured in the product form of liquid, powder & solid - with 80% preparation in solid form. Some of the common shapes are:

| Shape | Description | Weight |
|---|---|---|
| Laddu (bheti) | Small spherical / Semi-spherical lumps | 50 to 250 grams |
| Dhayya (bheti) | Semi-spherical lumps | 2 to 3 kg |
| Pari | Semi-spherical lumps | 1 to 2 kg |
| Chaukhanta | Trapezodial lumps | 4 to 5 kg |
| Pansera | Semi-spherical lumps | 5 to 6 kg |
| Dhansera | Semi-spherical lumps | 9 to 10 kg |
| Balti | Tapered cylindrical lumps | 10 to 20 kg |
| Chaku | Trapezodial lumps | 10 to 20 kg |
| Khurpa pad | Small trapezoidal slabs | 250 to 500 grams |

== Traditional jaggery production ==
The jaggery-making process involves five key steps:

1. Extraction of juice from sugarcane is done using a crusher, typically a three-roller vertical cane crusher, which extracts about 60% of juice.
2. Clarification of juice follows, using natural or chemical clarificants like sukhlai (a traditional ingredient, purifies and enhances the color of Gur, removing impurities and imparting a golden-brown hue and earthy flavor.) to remove impurities.
3. Boiling and concentration of juice then occurs to produce syrup, where juice is boiled briskly to evaporate water and ingredients like mustard oil are added to prevent frothing.
4. Cooling and molding into desired shapes, such as irregular or cake forms, takes place next, where hot syrup is worked out and left to solidify.
5. Finally, final shaping and packaging occur, where the semi-solid product is transferred to a flat platform, cooled, and a handful of phatki or alum is added to enhance color and texture, resulting in dark brownish jaggery with a fair texture.

== Usage ==
It is the oldest sweetening agent, used in various dishes and beverages. It is used in sweet dishes like laddoos, puran polis, kheer, and pitheys, as well as savory dishes. It plays a key role, including the festival of Makar Sankranti across India,

== Geographical indication ==
It was awarded the Geographical Indication (GI) status tag from the Geographical Indications Registry under the Union Government of India on 31 March 2023 (valid until 1 December 2030).

Haritzone Farmers Producer Company Limited from Muzaffarnagar, proposed the GI registration of Muzaffarnagar jaggery. After filing the application in December 2020, the jaggery was granted the GI tag in 2023 by the Geographical Indication Registry in Chennai, making the name "Muzaffarnagar Gur (Jaggery)" exclusive to the jaggery manufactured in the region. It thus became the first jaggery variety from Uttar Pradesh along with whole of India and the 46th type of goods from Uttar Pradesh to earn the GI tag.

== See also ==
- Kolhapur Jaggery
- Central Travancore jaggery
- Marayoor jaggery
