= Central Travancore jaggery =

Type of jaggery (non-centrifugal cane sugar) - agri-product from Kerala, India

- Geographical indication
- Alternative names: CTJ
- Description: A jaggery (agri-product) made from fresh sugarcane juice in Kottayam and Pathanamthitta Districts and Chengannur taluk in Alappuzha District of Kerala
- Type: Jaggery
- Area: Central Travancore, Kerala
- Country: India
- Registered: 31 May 2010
- Official website: ipindia.gov.in

The Central Travancore jaggery is a variety of jaggery (non-centrifugal cane sugar) made from fresh sugarcane juice in the Indian state of Kerala. It is an agri-product manufactured from sugarcane which is a common and widely cultivated crop in Kottayam and Pathanamthitta Districts and Chengannur taluk in Alappuzha District. The riverbanks and nearby places of Pamba, Manimala, Achenkovil and Meenachil rivers are primarily used for sugarcane cultivation in the region.

== Name ==
Central Travancore jaggery made from sugarcane is a prized crop in Central Travancore division and so named after the old Kingdom of Thiruvithamkoor or Kingdom of Travancore which comprises the current districts of Kottayam, Pathanamthitta and Alappuzha.

=== Local name ===
It is also known by its acronym as "CTJ". It is made into forms like 'Pathiyan Sarkara' - Pathiyan Sarkara is a semi-solid type of jaggery with a golden brown to brown color, good taste, and distinct flavor. The term "Pathiyan" signifies its malleable texture, while Sarkara means the crude form of sugar in the local state language of Malayalam.

Another form of handmade jaggery, called 'Unda Sarkara', is available in ball form, characterized by its hardness, ease of storage, and long shelf life, with a golden brown to brown color. "Unda" means ball in the local state language of Malayalam.

== Description ==
Jaggery from this region is highly sought after due to its exceptionally sweet taste and lack of saltiness, unlike jaggery produced from sugarcane grown in alkaline soils elsewhere.

== Traditional jaggery production ==
This jaggery is made by crushing sugarcane in an electric crusher, then boiling the juice in copper, aluminum, or tin pans using sugarcane waste as fuel. The mixture is removed at different temperatures to create various forms, then cooled and shaped. While still hot, it's molded into balls called Unda, or poured into tins to create a semi-solid form called Pathiyan.

== Usage ==
Central Travancore jaggery, renowned for its golden brown color, higher sweetness, and organic properties, serves as the preferred base for preparing Ayurvedic medicines in Kerala.

== Geographical indication ==
It was awarded the Geographical Indication (GI) status tag from the Geographical Indications Registry under the Union Government of India on 31 May 2010 (valid until 1 March 2029).

The Director of Research, Kerala Agricultural University from Thissur, proposed the GI registration of Central Travancore jaggery. After filing the application in March 2009, the jaggery was granted the GI tag in 2010 by the Geographical Indication Registry in Chennai, making the name "Central Travancore jaggery" exclusive to the jaggery manufactured in the region. It thus became the first jaggery variety from Kerala along with whole of India and the 18th type of goods from Kerala to earn the GI tag.

== See also ==
- Marayoor jaggery
- Edayur chilli
- Kuttiattoor Mango
- Kolhapur Jaggery
- Muzaffarnagar jaggery
