= Kuttiattoor Mango =

Mango cultivar from Kerala, India

Mangifera 'Kuttiattoor'
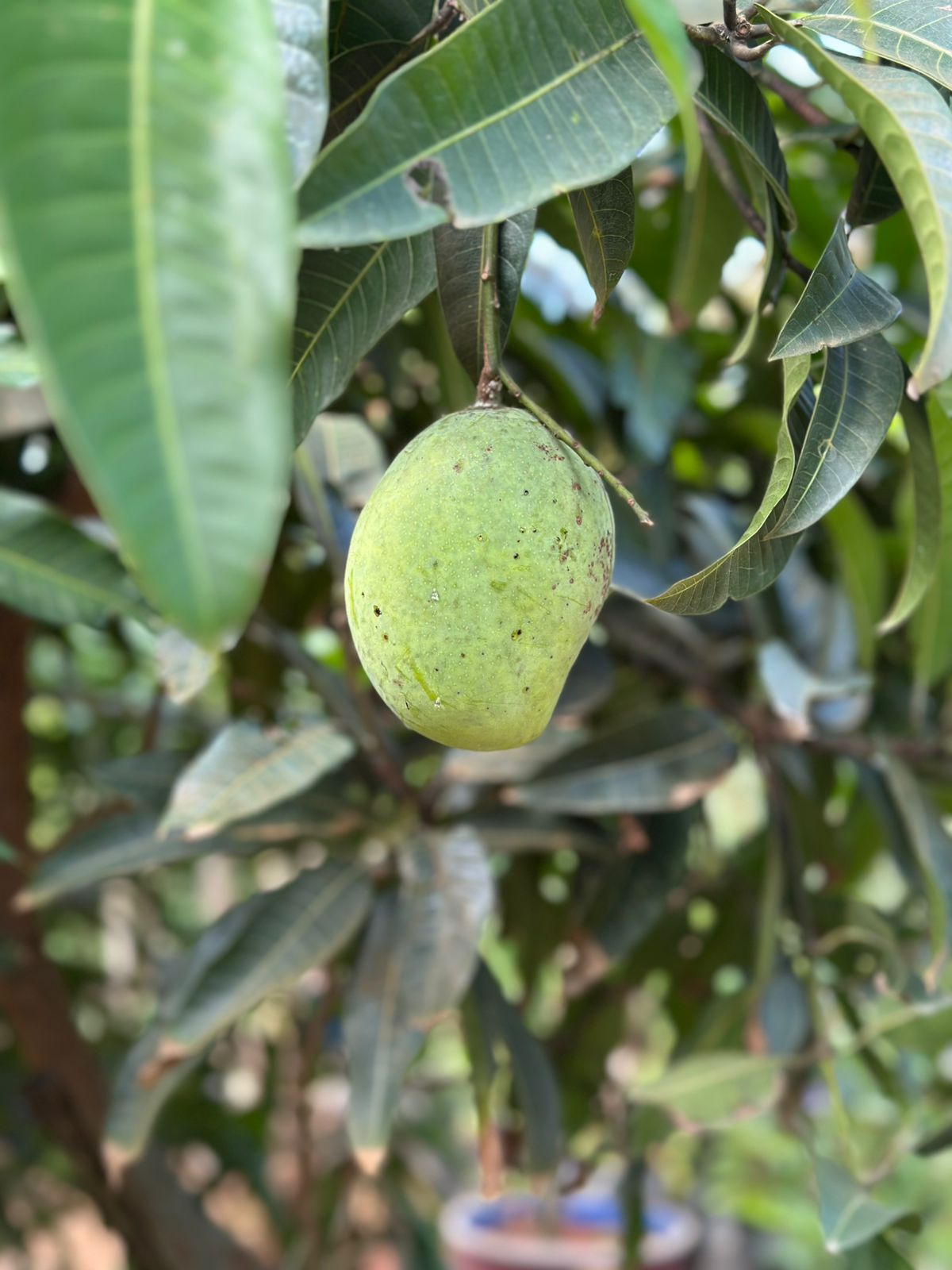
- Genus: Mangifera
- Species: Mangifera indica
- Cultivar: 'Kuttiattoor'
- Origin: India

The 'Kuttiattoor' mango or Kuttiattoor Manga, is a mango cultivar primarily grown in the village of Kuttiattoor, Kannur district of Kerala, India. 'Nambiar maanga', 'Kannapuram maanga', 'Kunjimangalam manga' and 'Vadakkumbhagam manga,' are the variations of the same name.

== Name ==
The Kuttiattoor mango goes by two names: Nambiar mango for insiders and Kuttiattoor mango for outsiders.

=== Mythology ===
Local villagers cite the tale of some Nambiar who supplied this mango from Kuttiattoor to irikoor town. Thus villagers adopting the name "Nambiar mango".

== Description ==
Its orange-yellow color and superior taste, makes the Kuttiattoor mango a favorite. Its ripened skin remains speckle-free, enhancing its visual appeal. The mango variety is fleshy and juicy with high fiber content. Notably, local vendors ripen the mangoes without using chemicals or preservatives, instead relying on traditional methods using hay and leaves of the Strychnos nux-vomica (Kaanjiram) tree.

== Trivia ==
An surprising development has driven up the cost of Kuttiattoor mango leaves, exceeding that of the fruit, following a Kasaragod-based company's move to harness their natural properties for tooth powder production.

== Geographical indication ==
It was awarded the Geographical Indication (GI) status tag from the Geographical Indications Registry under the Union Government of India on 14 September 2021 (valid until 3 September 2029).

State Agriculture department represented by Agricultural officer Sri Adarsh K K and Kuttiattoor Mango Producer Company Limited from Kuttiattoor village proposed the GI registration of the Kuttiattoor mango. After filing the application in 2020, the fruit was granted the GI tag in 2021 by the Geographical Indication Registry in Chennai, making the name "Kuttiattoor" exclusive to the mangoes grown in the region. It thus became the first mango variety from Kerala to earn the GI tag.

== See also ==
- List of mango cultivars
- List of Geographical Indications in India
- Edayur chilli
- Central Travancore jaggery
