= Sangli raisins =

Type of raisins variety from Maharashtra, India

Sangli raisins (सांगली बेदाणे)
- Geographical indication
- Alternative names: Sangli Bedana
- Description: Sangli raisins is a dried grapes variety produced in Maharashtra
- Type: Dried grapes
- Area: Sangli district
- Country: India
- Registered: 18 May 2016
- Official website: ipindia.gov.in

Sangli raisins is a variety of raisin produced in the Indian state of Maharashtra in the Sangli district. Sangli District is located in the western part of Maharashtra, situated in the Managanga River-bed. The district is surrounded by the Warana and Krishna rivers. The Krishna s through the district for 105 km. The region's monsoon rains, fertile soil, and cool climate make it suitable for growing grapes. The major raisin-producing areas are Tasgaon, Miraj, Palus, and Kadegaon. Sangli district holds the top position as the largest raisin-producing district in India with 70% of total production.

Under its Geographical Indication tag, it is referred to as "Sangli raisins".

== Name ==
Sangli raisins are a prized agricultural produce in Sangli and so named after it. Locally it is known as "Sangli Bedana/Kishmish" in the state language of Marathi. There are two main types of raisins: Bedana/Kishmish, which is produced by drying seedless grapes, and Manuka/Munnakka, which is made by drying grapes that have seeds.

== Description ==
Sangli raisins have a distinct characteristic: each raisin remains separate. The region's geological and weather conditions, with low humidity and high temperatures, make it ideal for drying grapes naturally. Sangli raisins are famous for their uniform appearance, with a golden-green or golden-yellow color and smooth texture. They are also uniform in size and round in shape. The taste is pleasingly sweet without any sugar coating. The texture is intact with fewer wrinkles and higher pulp content. The skin is soft and thin with the golden green coloured uniform sized Sangli raisin melts in the mouth.

India's first export potential project center for raisins was established in Miraj in 2013. Tasgaon has a large market for raisins, with auctions held regularly. The export center is located in Khanapur. Raisin production began in Tasgaon around 40-45 years ago. Initially, dehydration chambers were used to dry grapes. Later, the method was refined, and solar energy was used for drying. The Sangli region produces high-quality raisins, with an annual production of around 1.25 lakh tonnes. About 30-40% of the production is exported. Tasgaon has over 100 raisin trading centers and 60-65 cold storages. The district has around 60,000 acres of grape plantations, specifically for raisin production. The types of raisins produced in Sangli include green, yellow, and black.

The weather conditions in Sangli, with high temperatures and low humidity, are favorable for raisin production. The grape varieties used for raisin production are specifically selected for their quality and characteristics. The main varieties include Thomson seedless, Manikchaman, Sonaka, and Tas-A-Ganesh. Drying grapes is a critical process that involves reducing the water content and increasing the sugar content. Australian dipping treatment is used to remove the waxy layer from the grapes, making the drying process faster.

The Sangli raisin variety is known for its uniform size and round shape. The region's unique climate and soil conditions contribute to the high quality of the raisins. The farmers in Sangli have developed a method of drying grapes under sheds, protecting them from direct sunlight. This method helps preserve the natural color and texture of the raisins.

== Geographical indication ==
It was awarded the Geographical Indication (GI) status tag from the Geographical Indications Registry, under the Union Government of India, on 18 May 2016 and is valid until 21 July 2034.

Maharashtra Rajya Draksh Bagaitdar Sangh from Sangli, proposed the GI registration of Sangli raisins. After filing the application in July 2014, the raisins was granted the GI tag in 2016 by the Geographical Indication Registry in Chennai, making the name "Sangli raisins" exclusive to the raisins produced in the region. It thus became the first raisins variety from India and the 18th type of goods from Maharashtra to earn the GI tag.

The GI tag protects the raisins from illegal selling and marketing, and gives it legal protection and a unique identity.

== See also ==
- Sangli turmeric
- Kolhapur jaggery
