= Edayur chilli =

Chilli variety grown in Kerala, India

Edayur chilli (എടയൂർ മുളക്)
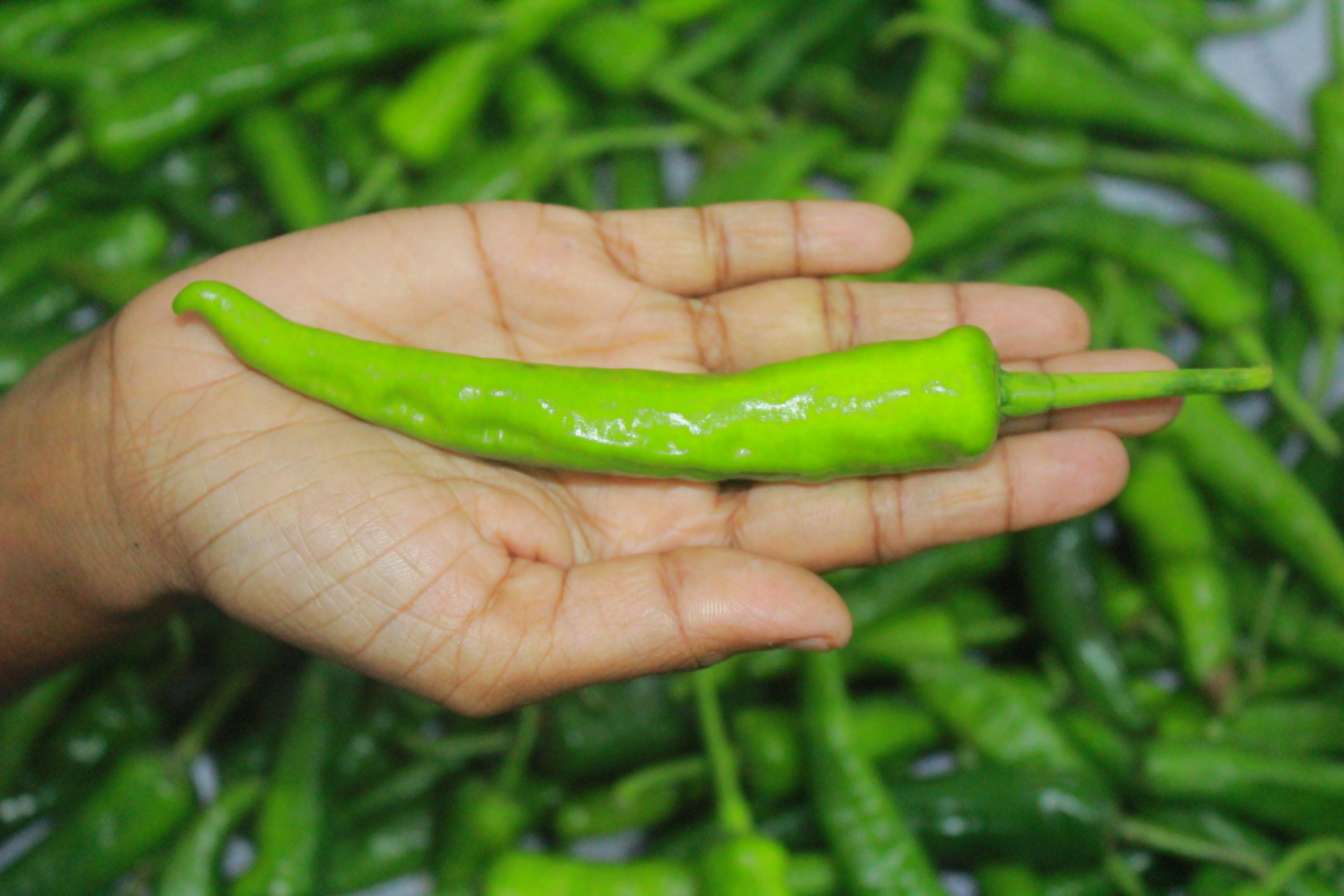
- Edayur chilli in unripe green stage
- Species: Capsicum annuum
- Origin: Kerala, India
- Scoville scale: 1968 SHU

The Edayur chilli is a variety of chilli mainly grown in the Indian state of Kerala. The Edayur chilli is a local cultivar primarily grown in specific regions of Kerala's Malappuram district. Specifically, it is cultivated in the panchayaths of Edayur, Athavanad, Marakkara, Irimbiliyam, Kalpakanchery, and Valanchery within the Valanchery block, as well as Moorkanad and Kuruva panchayaths within the Angadippuram block.

== Name ==
It is named after its place of origin, the village of Edayoor. According to documents available in the Edayur Grama Panchayath, the cultivation of Edayur chilli in the region dates back at least 150 years.

=== Local name ===
It is known as Edayur mulaku. Mulaku in the local state language of Malayalam means chilli.

== Description ==
=== Cultivation ===
The Edayur chilli's traditional cultivation grounds include hills, hillocks, and lateritic fields.

=== Physical characteristics ===
Its physical appearance is marked by drooping, solitary berries with a moderately triangular shape with a smooth surface.

=== Pungency and Usage ===
The Edayur chilli is primarily utilized to create a traditional Kerala delicacy called "Kondattom," or sun-dried curd chillies. These dried Kondattom Mulaku can be stored for several months, retaining their distinct flavor. When fried, Kondattom serves as a delectable side dish, paired with curd, making it a simple yet delightful accompaniment to meals.

== Photo Gallery ==
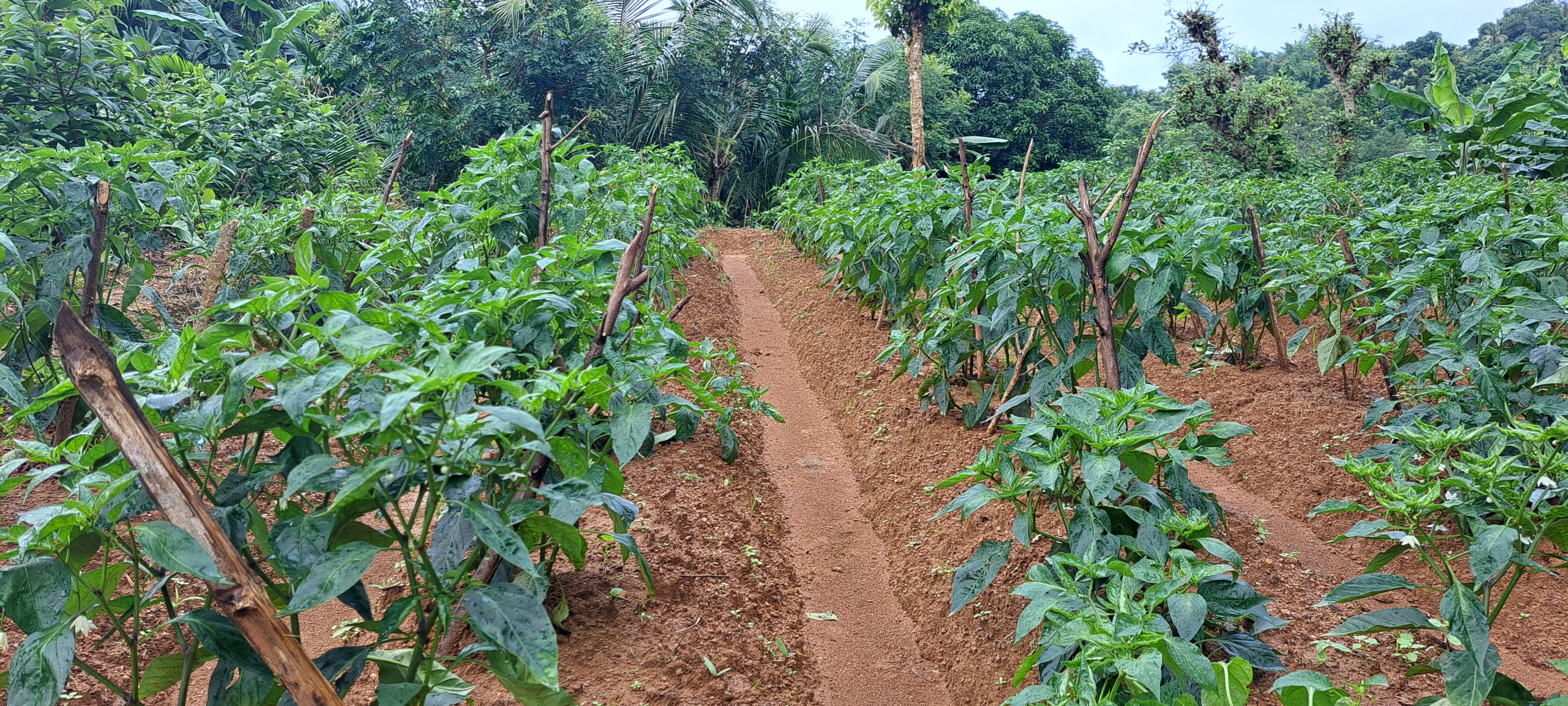
Longshot view of an Edayur Chilli farm

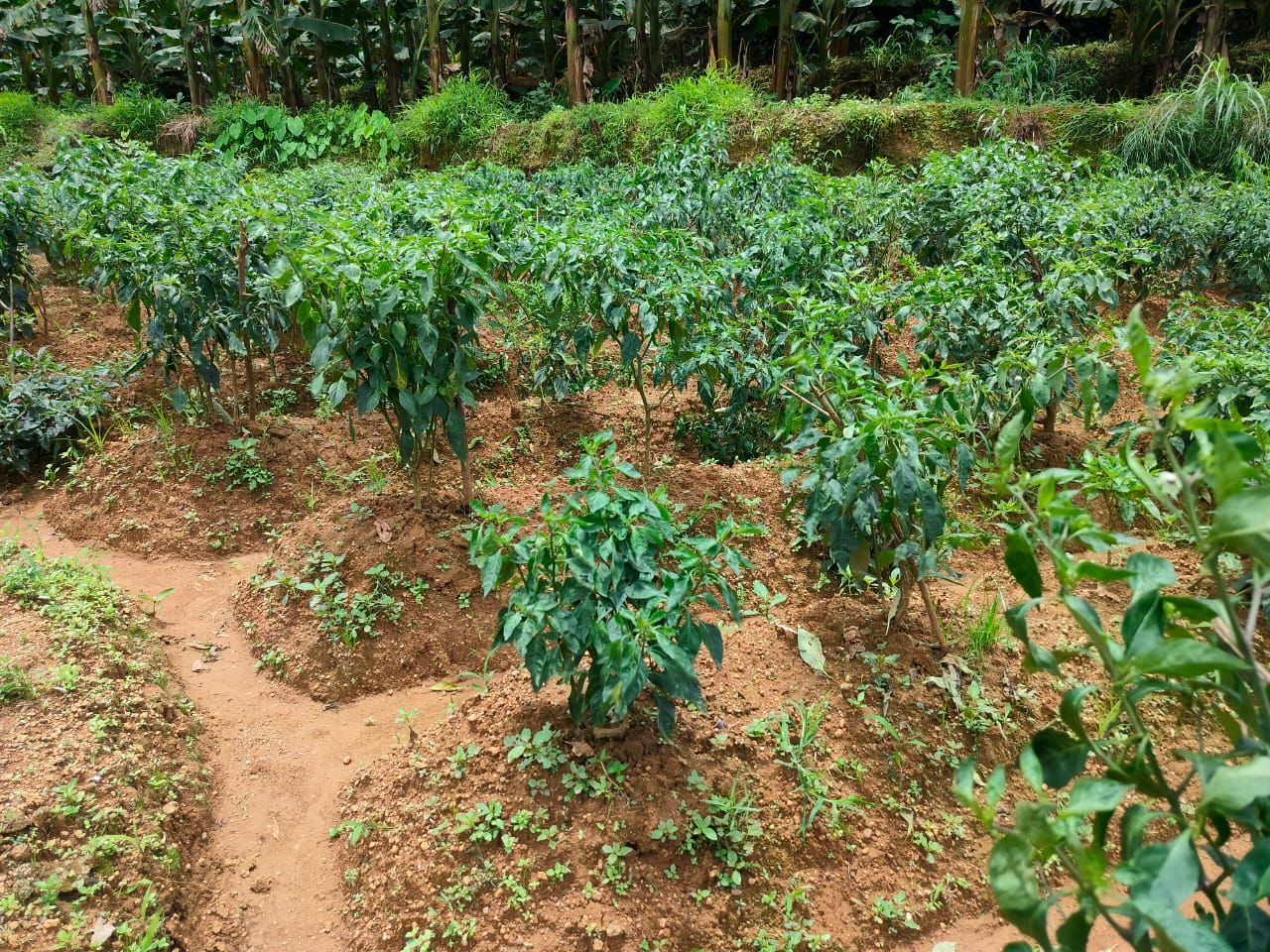
View of a Chilli farm

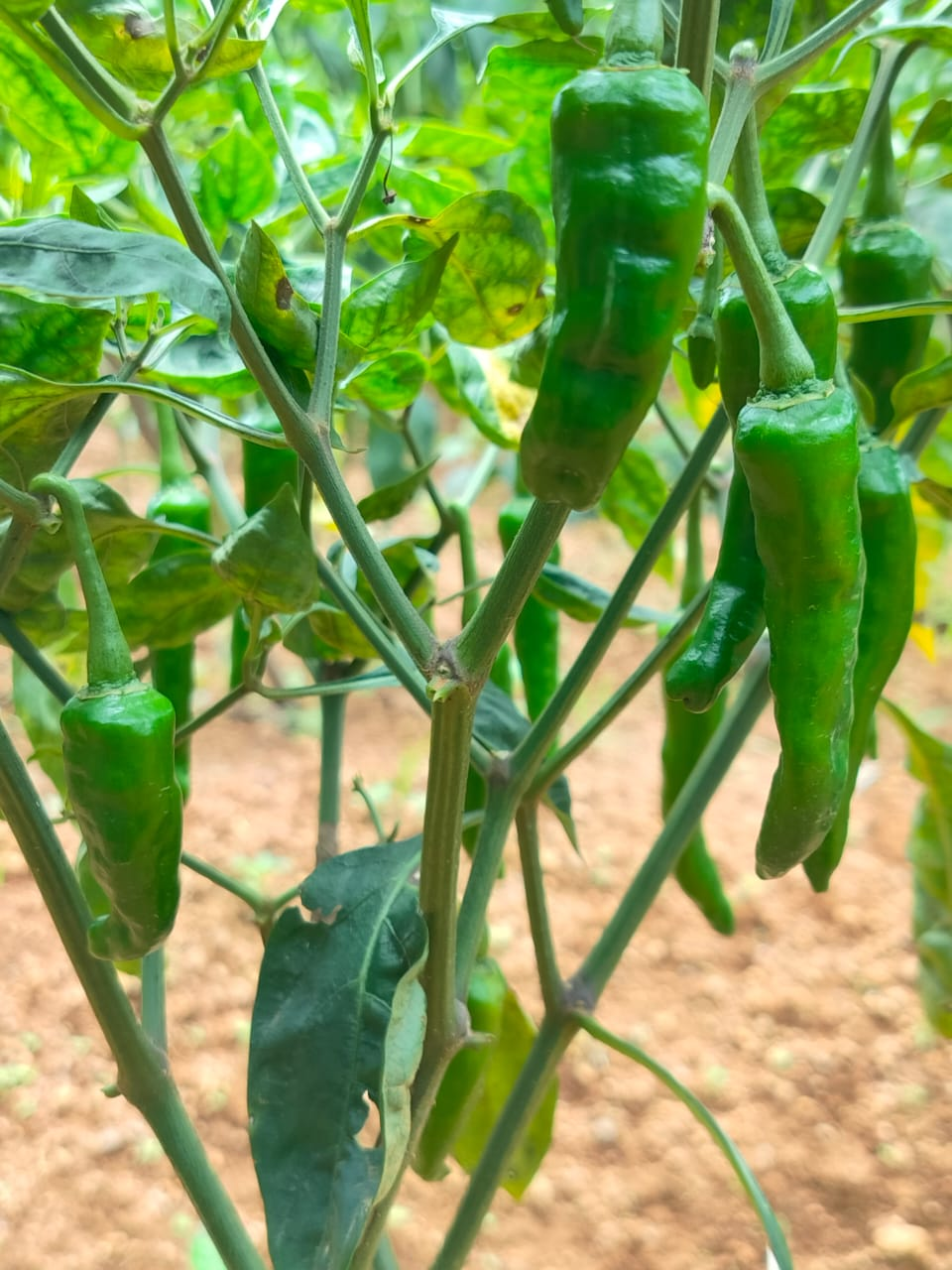
Extreme Closeup of Edayur Chilli at a farm

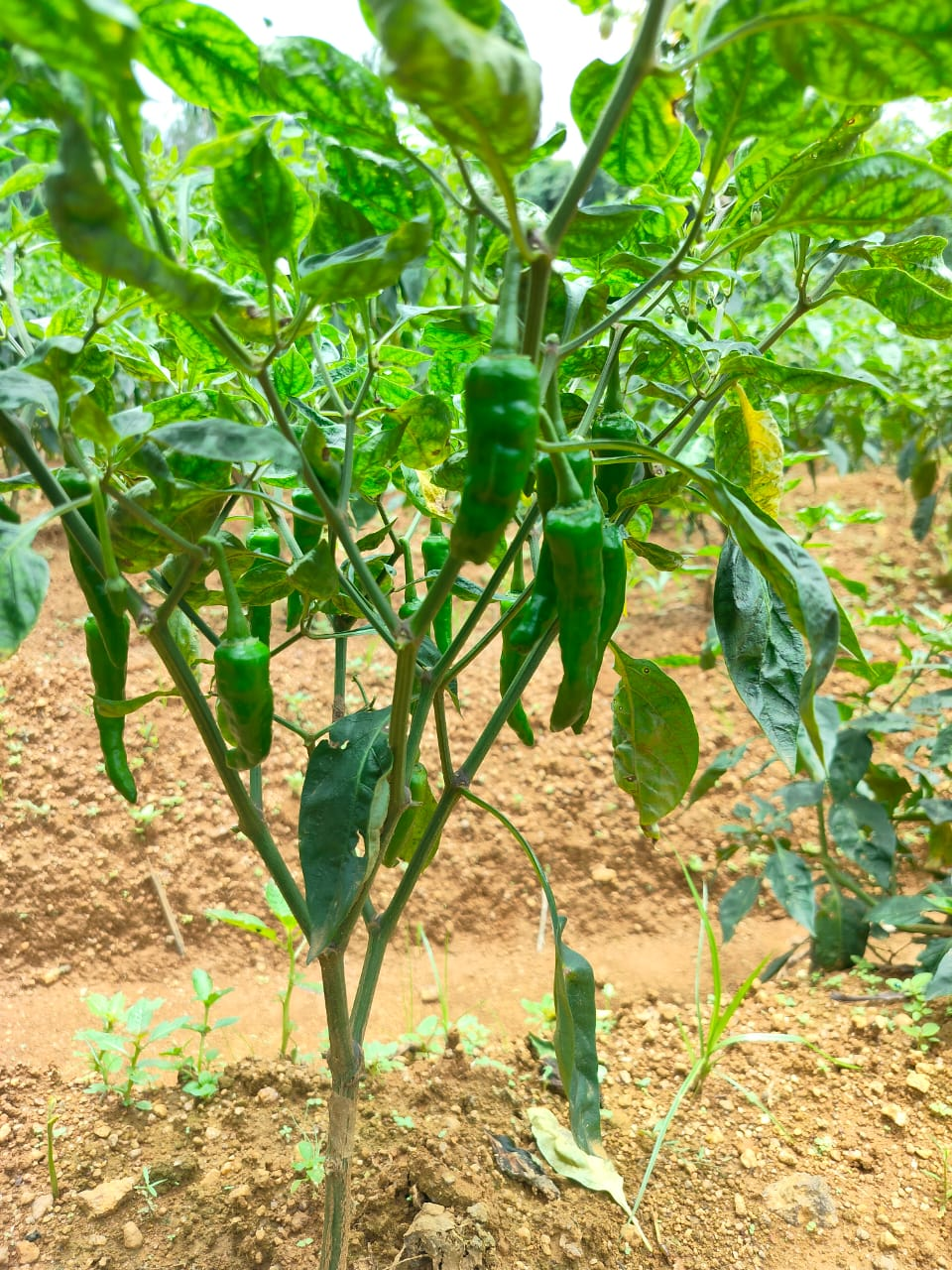
Closeup of chillies and plant at a farm

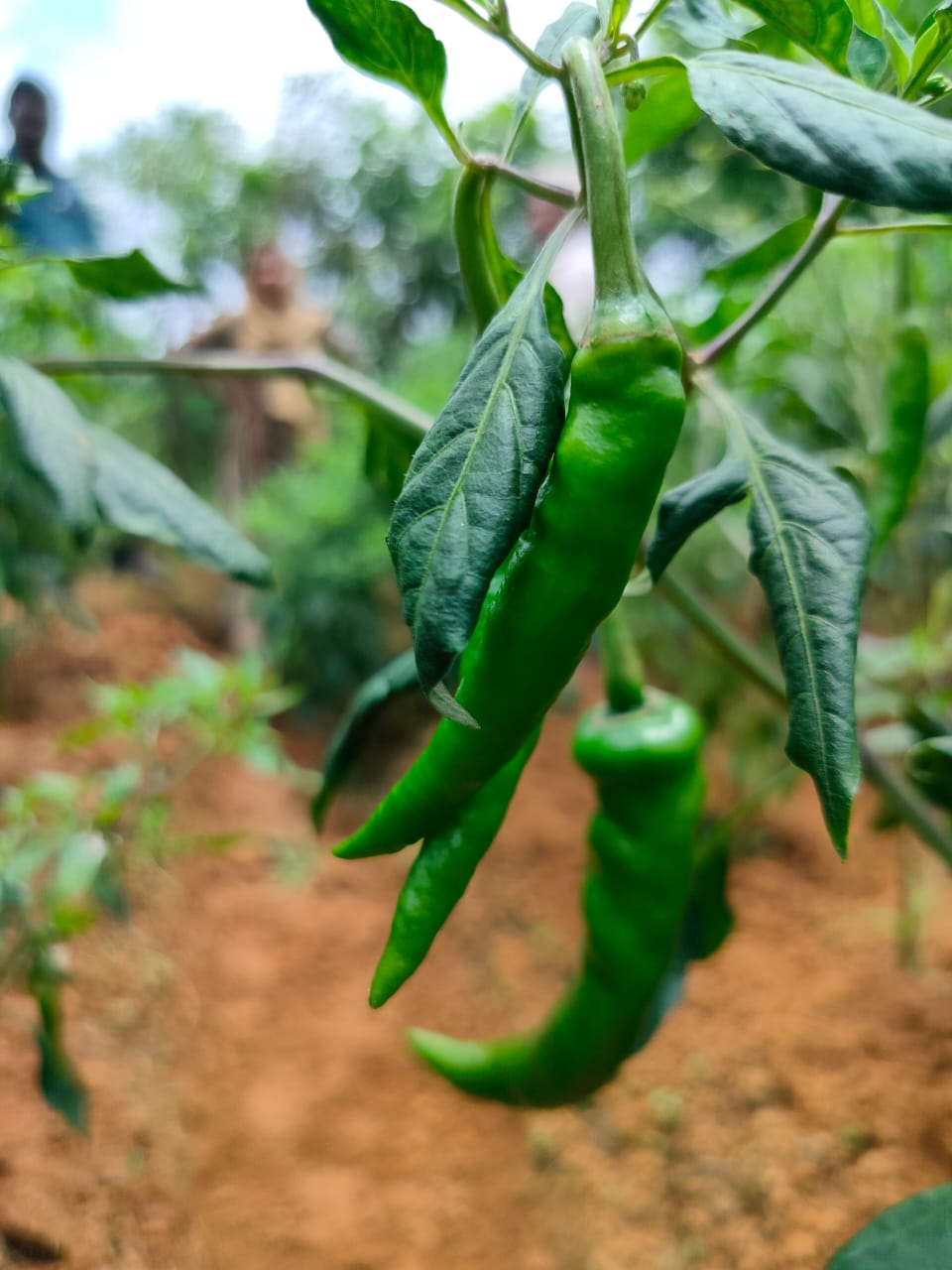
Closeup of Chilli at a farm

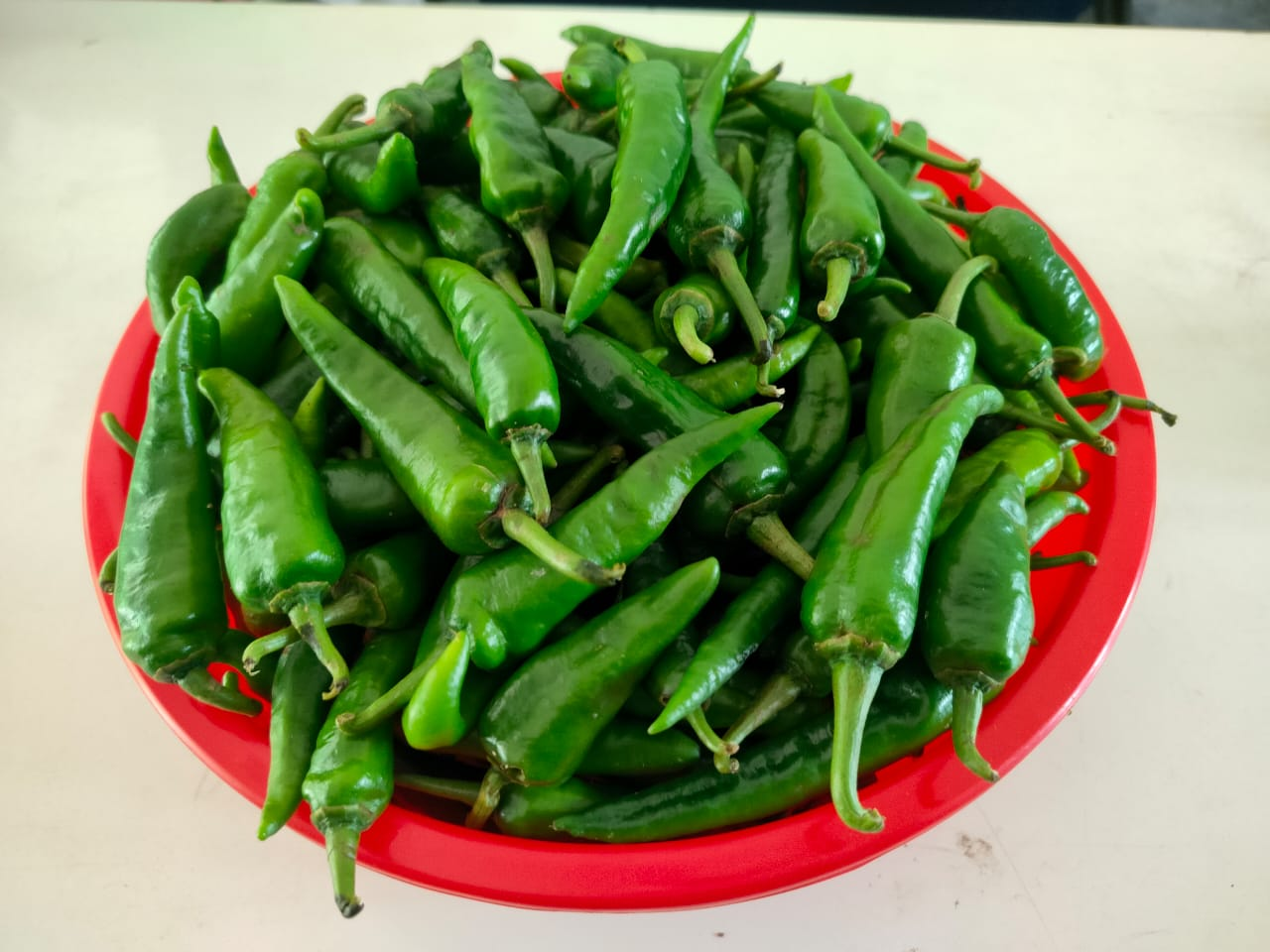
Collection of chillies gathered in a tub

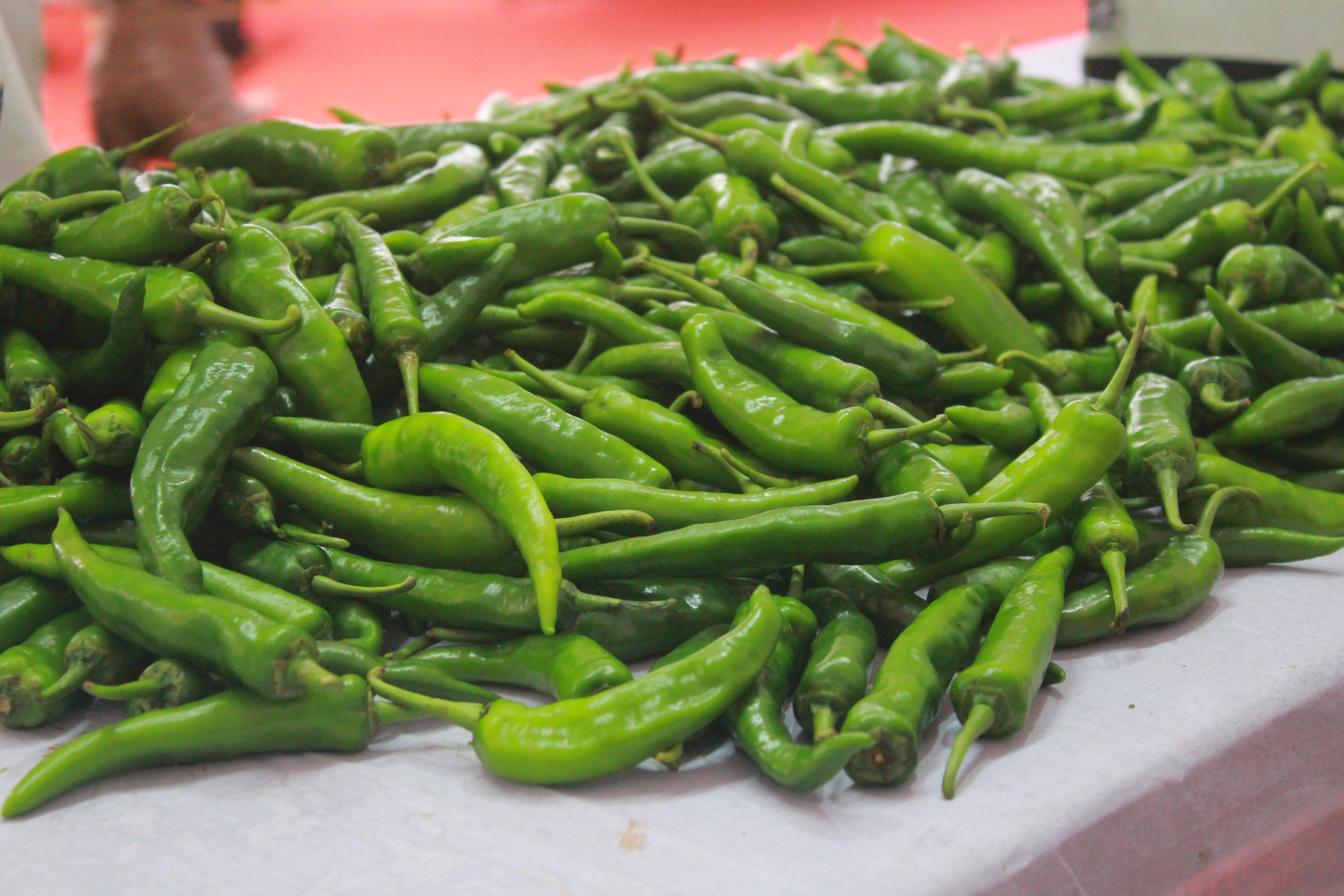
Another closeup of chillies

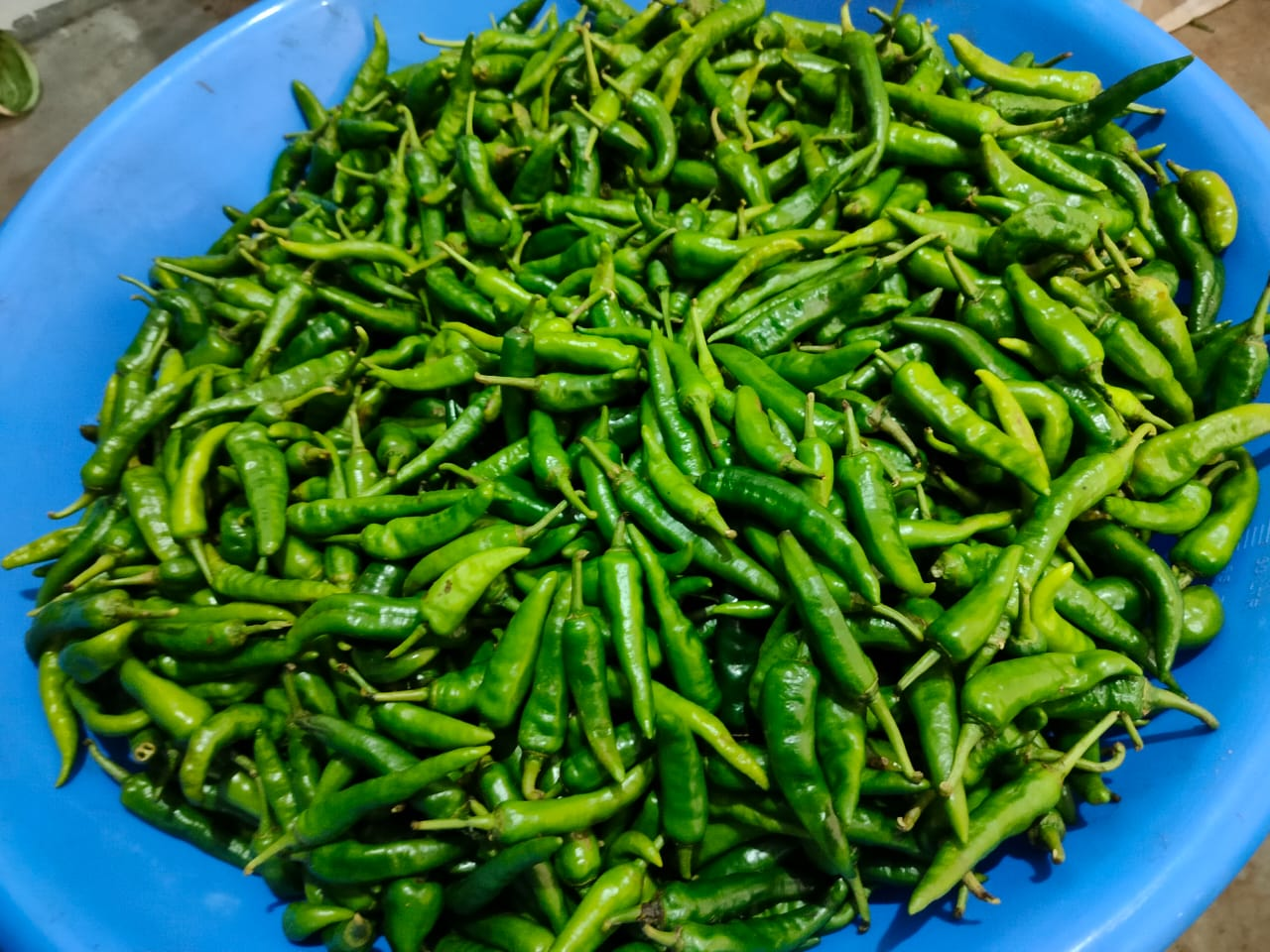
Another collection of chillies gathered in a tub

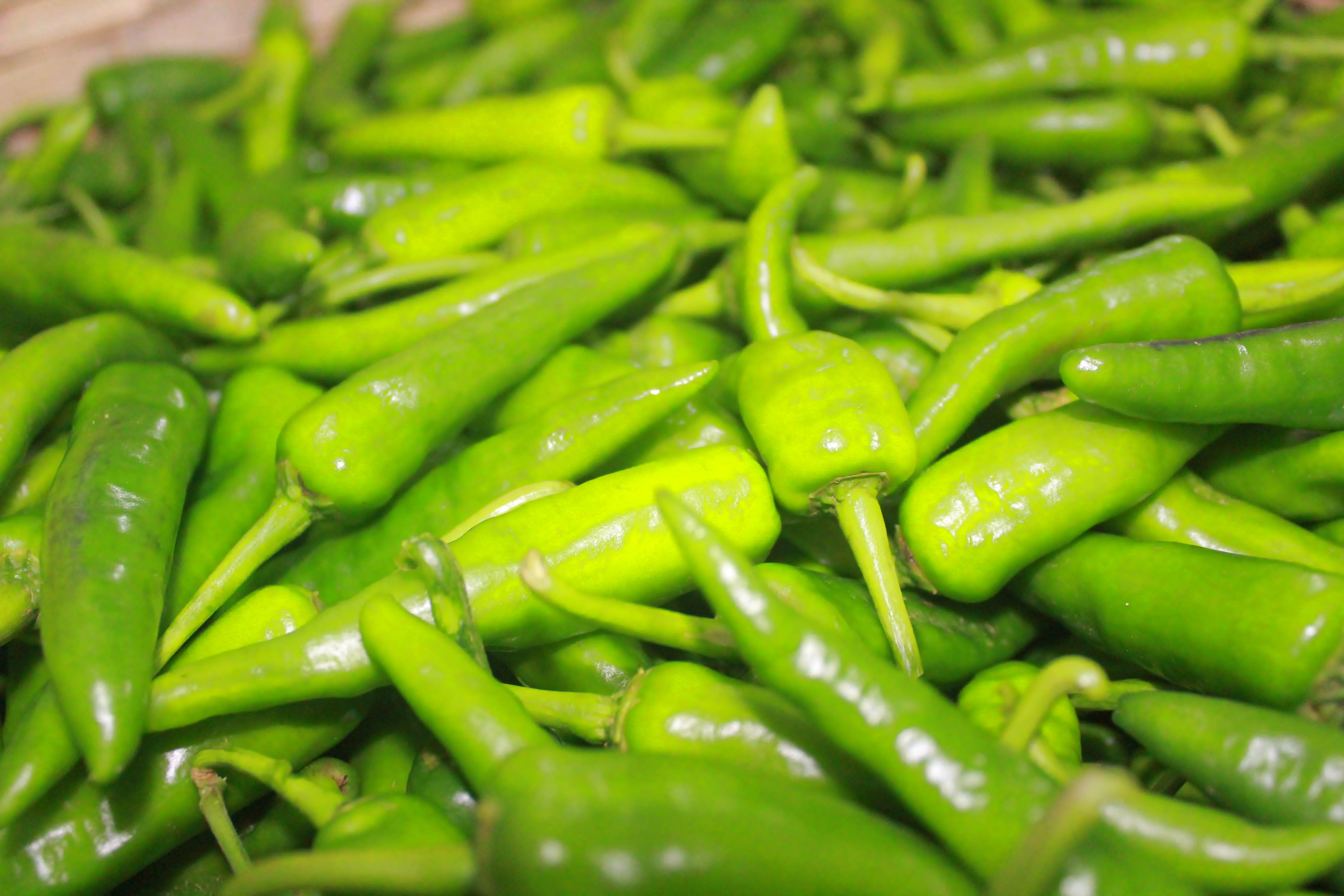
Another closeup of collection of chillies

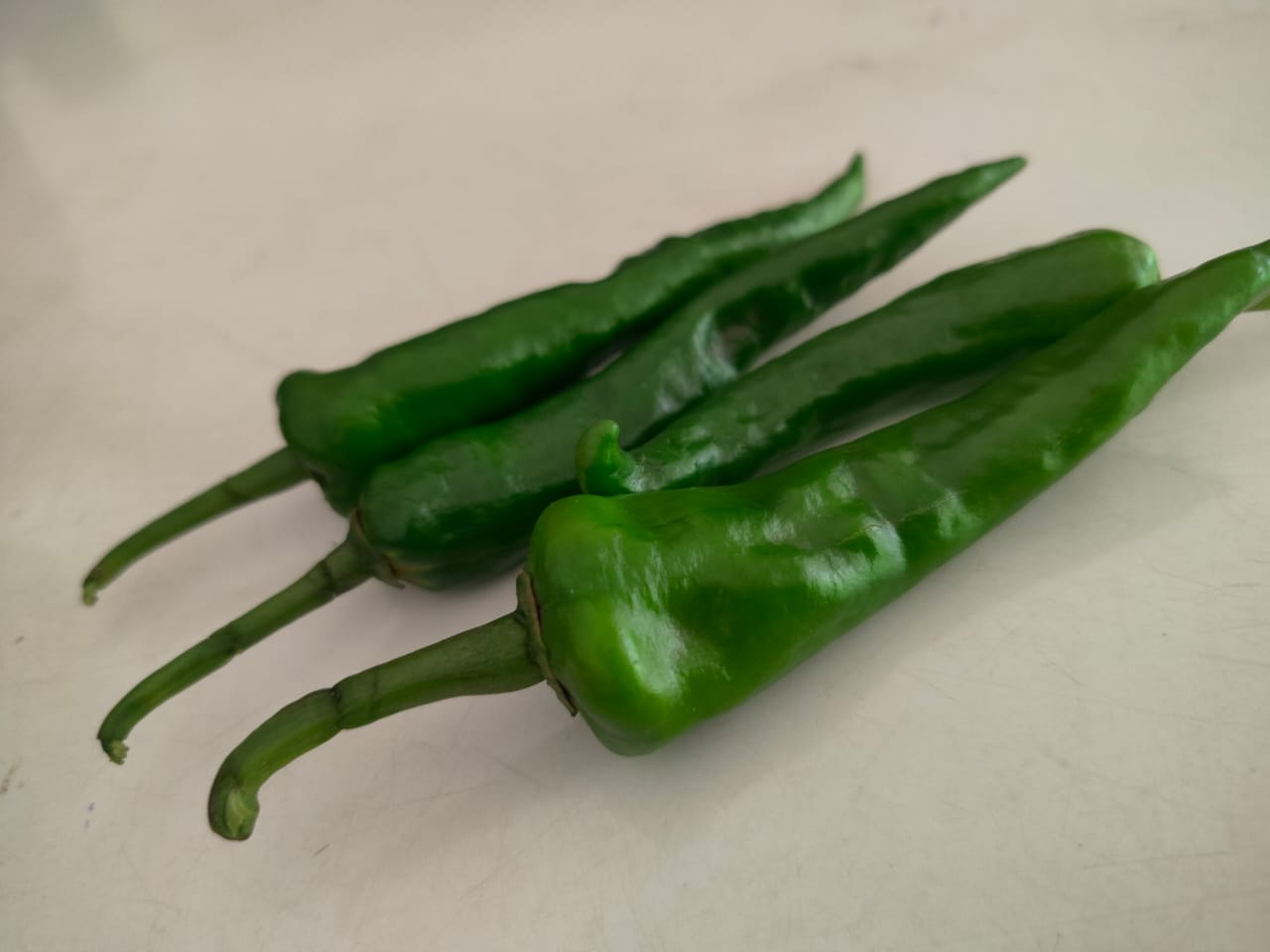
Closeup of Edayur Chillies

== Geographical indication ==
It was awarded the Geographical Indication (GI) status tag from the Geographical Indications Registry under the Union Government of India on 14 September 2021 (valid until 2 October 2029).

Edayoor Chilli Grovers Association (ECGA) from Edayur, proposed the GI registration of Edayur Chilli. After filing the application in October 2019, the chilli was granted the GI tag in 2021 by the Geographical Indication Registry in Chennai, making the name "Edayur Chilli" exclusive to the chilies grown in the region. It thus became the first chilli variety from Kerala and the 34th type of goods from Kerala to earn the GI tag. Kuttiattoor Mango from the Kannur district of Kerala received GI tag at the same time.

== See also ==
- Ramanathapuram Mundu chilli
- Kuttiattoor Mango
- Central Travancore jaggery
