= Ramnagar Bhanta =

Type of Brinjal variety from Uttar Pradesh, India

Ramnagar Bhanta (Brinjal) - रामनगर भंटा
- Geographical indication
- Description: Ramnagar Bhanta (Brinjal) is a brinjal variety cultivated in Uttar Pradesh
- Type: Brinjal
- Area: Ramnagar, Varanasi district with other districts of Mirzapur, Chandauli and Sonbhadra
- Country: India
- Registered: 31 March 2023
- Official website: ipindia.gov.in

Ramnagar Bhanta (Brinjal) is a variety of brinjal grown in the Indian state of Uttar Pradesh. It is a common and widely cultivated crop in areas like Ramnagar in Varanasi district along with the entire district and other districts of Mirzapur, Chandauli and Sonbhadra.

Under its Geographical Indication tag, it is referred to as "Ramnagar Bhanta (Brinjal)".

== Name ==
Ramnagar Bhanta (Brinjal) is a prized vegetable crop in Ramnagar and so named after it. The word "Bhanta" means brinjal and also referred to names like Baigan and Bhanta or Bhata in the local state language of Hindi.

== Description ==
The Ramnagar Bhanta is a unique variety of brinjal (eggplant) grown in the Varanasi region. It is highly sought after for its exclusive Chokha (Bharta) preparation. The fruit is a pendent, fleshy berry, borne singly or in clusters, with varying shapes (ovoid, oblong, obovoid, or long cylindrical) and colors (purple, purple-black, yellowish, white, green, and variegated). One of the unique features of Ramnagar Bhanta is its ability to increase in size significantly during foggy winter weather, growing up to 2 kg or more. Notable varieties of Ramnagar Bhanta include the Ramnagar Giant and KS-233. Both of these varieties have shown resistance to Phomopsis blight and moderate resistance to fruit rot.

The Ramnagar Bhanta is a warm and winter season crop, which can grow up to 2-2.5 kg or more in a single piece. It is grown in the Gangetic Plain area of Varanasi and nearby districts (Mirzapur, Chandauli, and Sonebhadra). The special characteristics of soil and water in the region support its growth. Local farmers have preserved this landrace and proudly grow it with quality. They use traditional methods for seed selection, choosing yellow-colored brinjals for seed purposes. The Ramnagar Bhanta is rich in vitamins, minerals, and has high nutritive value.

The Lota Bhanta Mela, a traditional fair, is held on the outskirts of Varanasi in Rameshwaram teerth, Harhua, near the Lal Bahadur Shastri Airport. The origins of the Lota Bhanta Mela date back several centuries to its founder, Lotum Bhatt. Over time, the name evolved into "Lota-Bhanta." This transformation is mirrored in the symbolic ceremonial rituals that have developed around the fair. Devotees offer brinjals and clay pots to the presiding deity, while many others roast brinjals over an open flame, pairing them with rotis cooked on-site. The fair attracts pilgrims from surrounding villages who gather to enjoy a simple meal of roti and roasted brinjal (bhanta). Interestingly, the name "Lota Bhanta" is also linked to the traditional cooking method, where brinjals are cooked in earthen pots (lota) over a cowdung fire. The term "lota" refers to an earthen pot or pitcher, and "bhanta" means brinjal. The Ramnagar Bhanta holds significant cultural value, being a staple dish during the famous Ramnagar Ramlila, where thousands gather to watch the performance. Bati-Chokha, made with Ramnagar Bhanta, is a traditional and favorite dish in the region.

== Geographical indication ==
It was awarded the Geographical Indication (GI) status tag from the Geographical Indications Registry, under the Union Government of India, on 31 March 2023 and is valid until 3 November 2030.

Kashi Vishwanath Farmer Producer Company from Varanasi, proposed the GI registration of Ramnagar Bhanta (Brinjal). After filing the application in November 2020, the Brinjal was granted the GI tag in 2023 by the Geographical Indication Registry in Chennai, making the name "Ramnagar Bhanta (Brinjal)" exclusive to the Brinjal grown in the region. It thus became the first brinjal variety from Uttar Pradesh and the 45th type of goods from Uttar Pradesh to earn the GI tag.

The GI tag protects the brinjal from illegal selling and marketing, and gives it legal protection and a unique identity.

== See also ==
- Jalgaon Bharit Brinjal
- Agsechi Vayingim (Agassaim Brinjal)
- Vellore Spiny brinjal
- Nayagarh Kanteimundi brinjal
- Banaras Pan (Betel Leaf)
- Banaras Lal Bharwamirch (Red Pickle chilli)
