= Banaras Lal Bharwamirch =

Chilli variety grown in Uttar Pradesh, India

Banaras Lal Bharwamirch (Red Pickle Chilli) - बनारसी लाल भरवा मिर्च
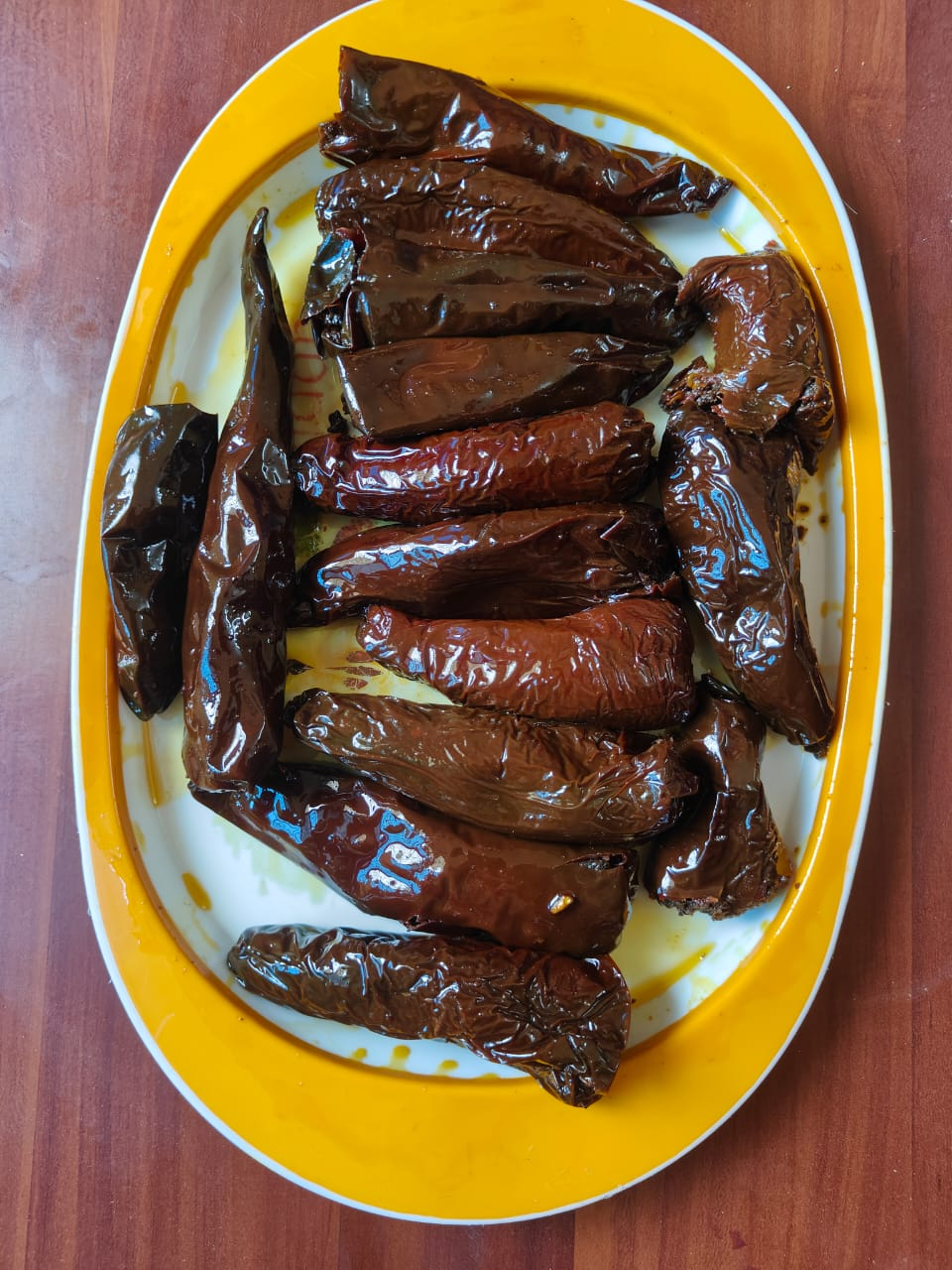
- Banaras Lal Bharwamirch Achaar - Ripened red stuffed chilli in pickle form
- Species: Capsicum annuum
- Origin: Uttar Pradesh, India

The Banaras Lal Bharwamirch (Red Pickle Chilli) is a variety of chilli grown in the Indian state of Uttar Pradesh. It is mainly cultivated in Varanasi, Azamgarh, Jaunpur, Ghazipur & Ballia districts of Uttar Pradesh.

== Name ==
It is named after its place of origin, the region of Banaras (also known as Varanasi), located in Purvanchal region of Uttar Pradesh. Lal means Red relating to its colour; Bharwa means stuffed as it is exclusively used in traditional pickles while Mirch means Chilli - in the local Hindi language.

=== Local name ===
It is known as Lal Sona - meaning Red Gold in the local Hindi language.

== Description ==
The Banaras Lal Bharwamirch, has unique characteristics - When grown in the field, its skin is exceptionally thick, but upon stuffing with spices, it gradually thins, becoming delicate like paper. This mildly spicy chilli is predominantly used for Banarasi Lal Mirch Bharwa Achar (stuffed pickle), a beloved and traditional condiment. Notably, the unripe Banarasi Lal Mirch is non-bitter, but gradually develops a bitter taste upon ripening, adding to its culinary significance.

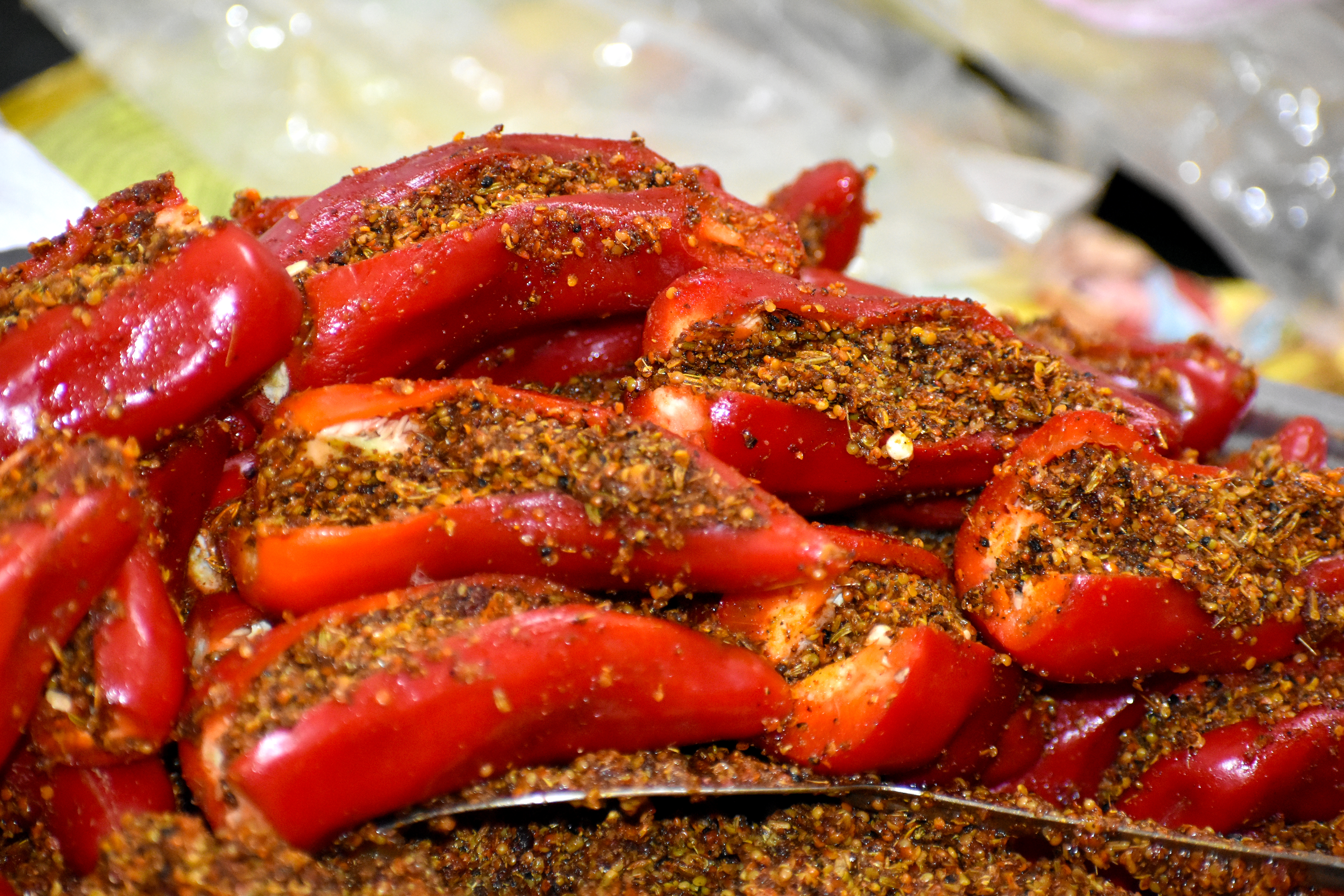
Preparation

== Geographical indication ==
It was awarded the Geographical Indication (GI) status tag from the Geographical Indications Registry under the Union Government of India on 30 March 2024 (valid until 2 February 2032).

Pragatisheel Arajiline Farmer Producer Company Limited represented by Mr. Shyam Bihari Lal Verma from Varanasi, proposed the GI registration of Banaras Lal Bharwamirch (Red Pickle Chilli). After filing the application on 03/02/2022, the chilli was granted the GI tag in 2024 by the Geographical Indication Registry in Chennai, making the name "Banaras Lal Bharwamirch (Red Pickle Chilli)" exclusive to the chilies grown in the region. It thus became the first chilli variety from Uttar Pradesh and the 61st type of goods from Uttar Pradesh to earn the GI tag.

== See also ==
- Rataul Mango
- Harmal Chilli
- Bhiwapur chilli
- Banaras Pan (Betel Leaf)
- Ramnagar Bhanta (Brinjal)
