= Jalgaon banana =

Type of banana variety from Maharashtra, India

Jalgaon banana (जळगावची केळी)
- Geographical indication
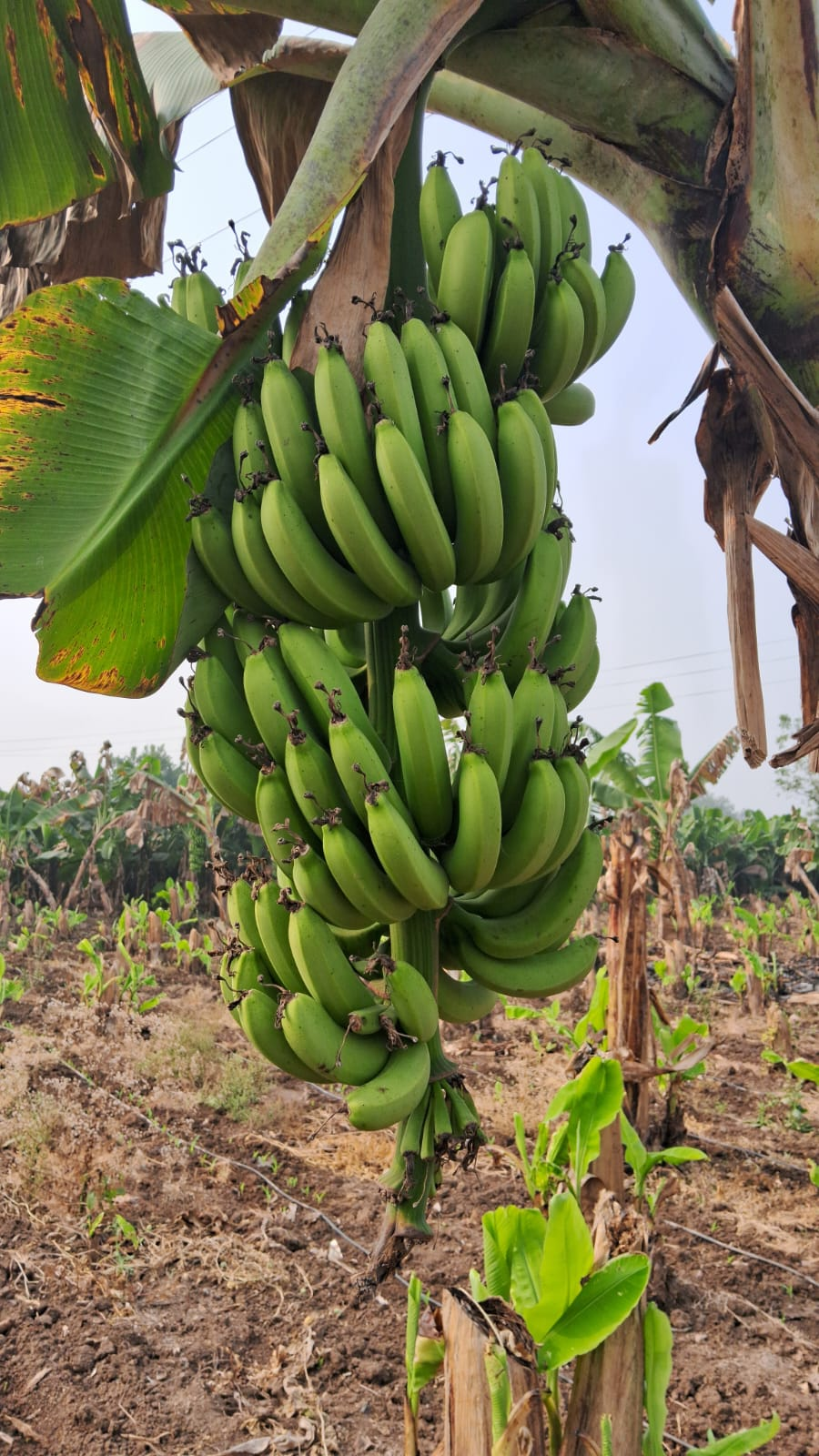
- Jalgaon Banana Bunch close-up
- Alternative names: जळगावची केळी
- Description: Jalgaon banana is a banana variety cultivated in Maharashtra
- Type: Banana
- Area: Jalgaon district
- Country: India
- Registered: 30 October 2016
- Official website: ipindia.gov.in

Jalgaon banana is a variety of banana grown in the Indian state of Maharashtra. It is a common and widely cultivated crop in Jalgaon district located in the Khandesh region of North Maharashtra. Under its Geographical Indication tag, it is referred to as "Jalgaon Banana".

== Name ==
Jalgaon banana is a prized crop in Jalgaon and so named after it. Jalgaon is known as the "Banana Capital" of India, and is the world's seventh largest banana producer contributing 16% of the India's banana production. The district accounts for 69% of Maharashtra's banana production area and 61% of its production. Despite high summer temperatures, the presence of the Satpuda Mountains and Tapi River makes Jalgaon suitable for banana cultivation, as it is a water-loving crop.

== Description ==
Banana cultivation in Jalgaon began in the year 1925. Soldiers from the Maratha armies of Chhatrapati Shivaji Maharaj brought the fruit from the Konkan region while conquering the states in the south. Initially, Jalgaon's dry weather was a disadvantage. However, the introduction of drip irrigation enabled efficient water use, and now the entire 48,000-hectare banana cultivation area uses this method.

Bananas from Khandesh, where Jalgaon is located, are famous for their unique taste. The "Shrimanti" variety is in high demand across the country for its taste and quality. The region grows several banana varieties, including Dwarf Cavendish, Robusta, Grand Naine, Madhukar and Shrimanti. The 'Basrai' variety, mainly grown in Jalgaon, has a distinct flavor and yields 43-63 tonnes per hectare.

Jalgaon bananas are exported to Delhi, Mumbai, Agra, Jhansi etc. and also to countries like UAE. The "Horticulture Train" plays a crucial role in this, carrying over 1,000 tonnes of bananas from Bhusawal to Delhi. This specially designed train has ventilated containers, reducing transportation and storage costs for traders and farmers, and minimizing wastage.

== Photo Gallery ==
Actual photos from a Jalgaon banana farmer from Adgaon.

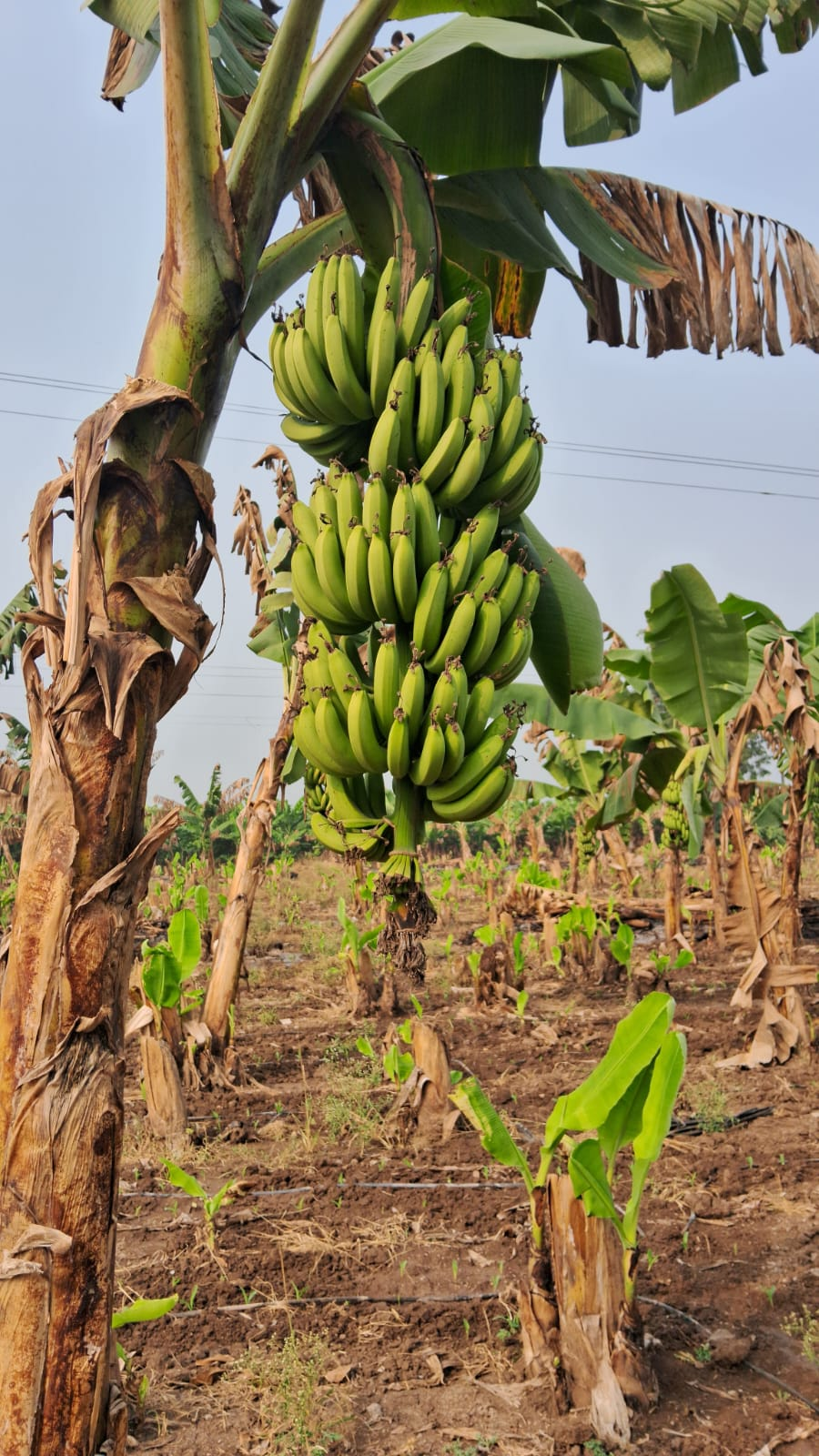
Jalgaon Banana plant ar a farm at Adgaon

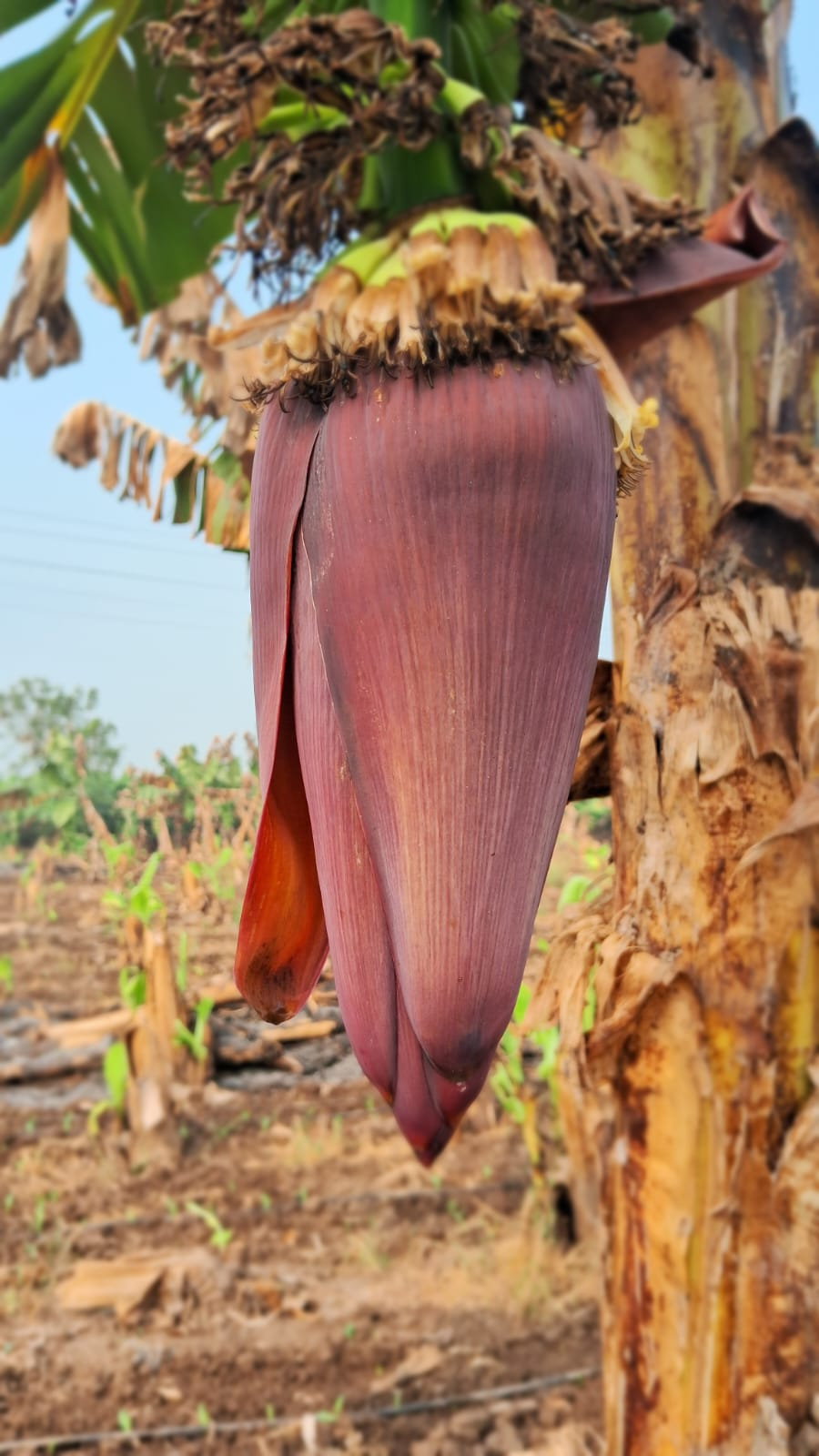
Jalgaon Banana with Flower closeup

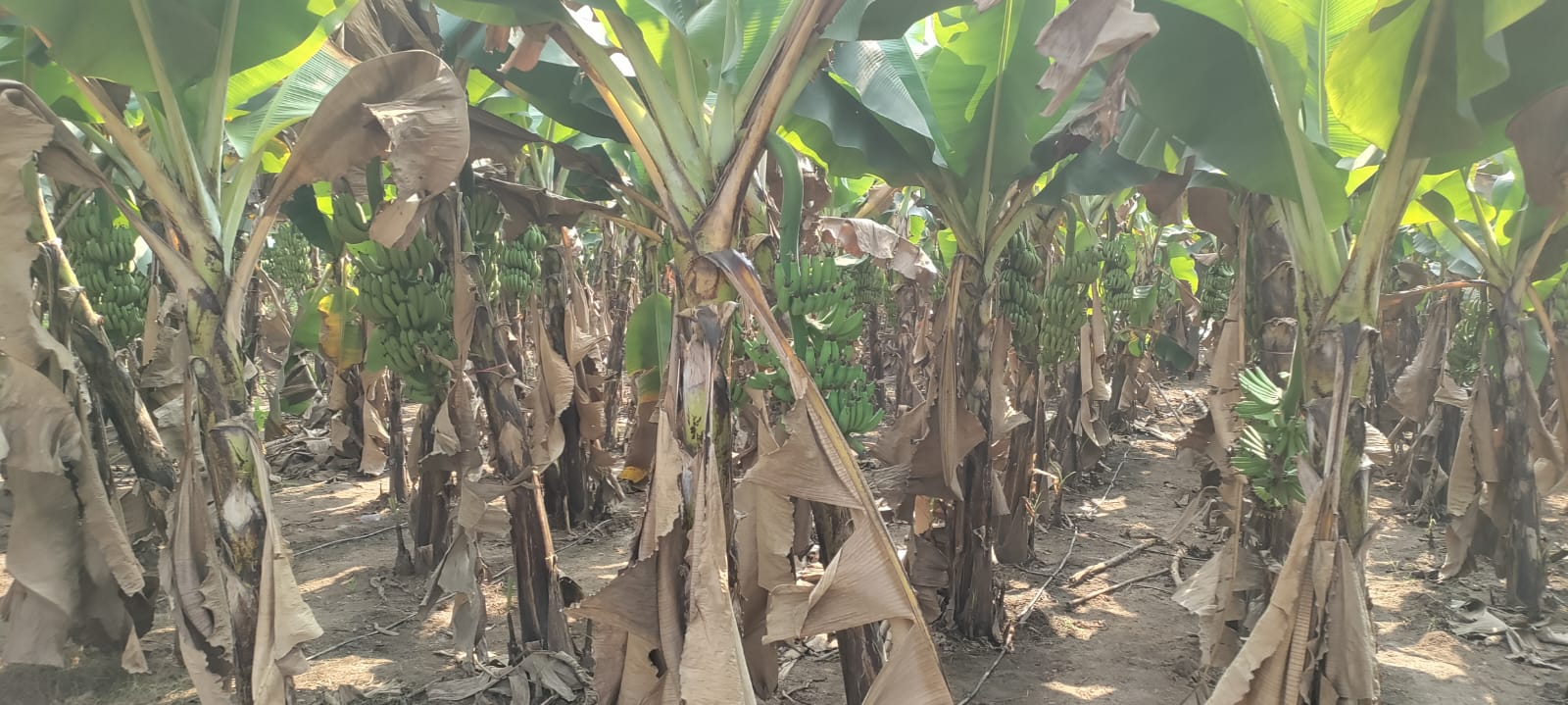
Jalgaon Banana Farm at Adgaon in Jalgaon

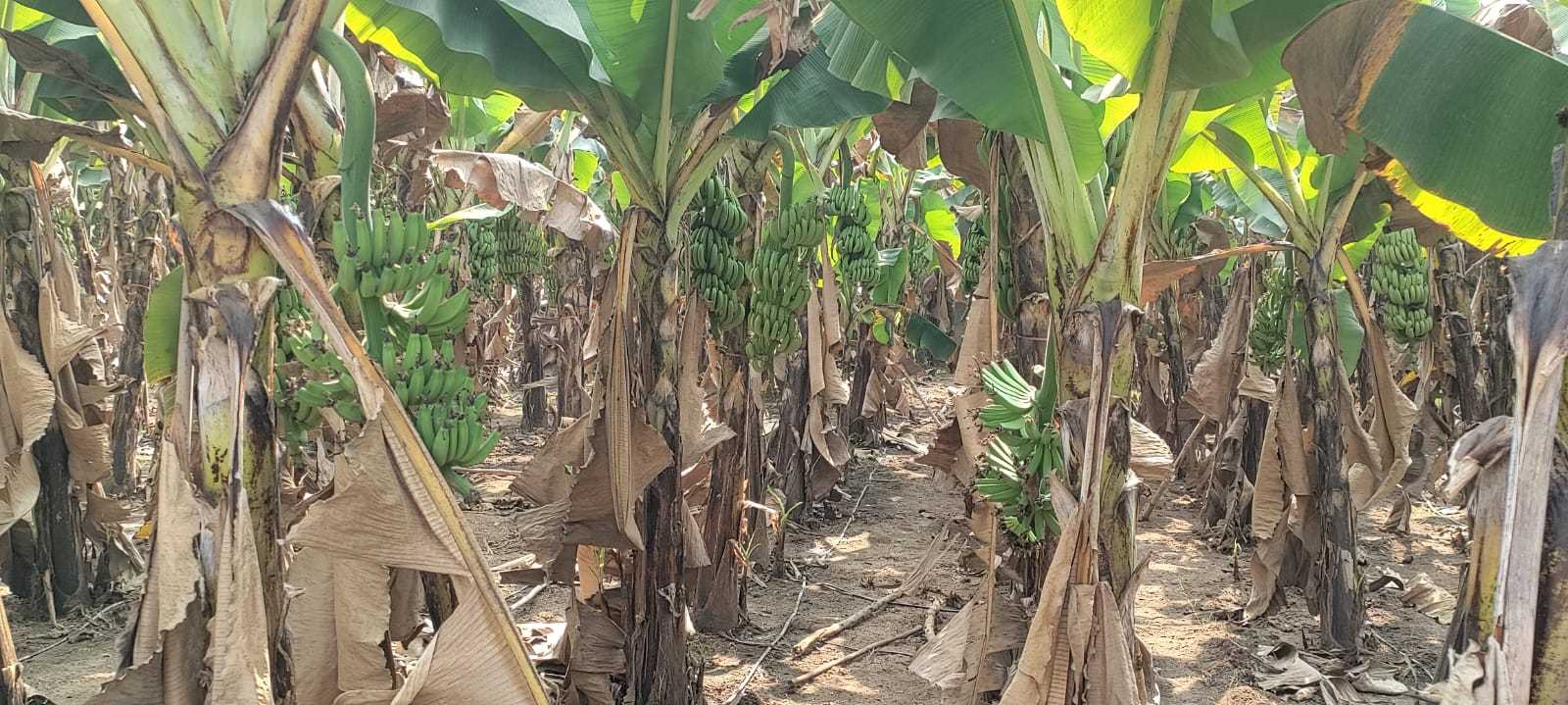
Another photo of Jalgaon Banana Farm at Adgaon in Jalgaon

== Geographical indication ==
It was awarded the Geographical Indication (GI) status tag from the Geographical Indications Registry, under the Union Government of India, on 30 October 2016 and is valid until 29 September 2024.

Nisargraja Krushi Vidnyan Kendra from Jalgaon, proposed the GI registration of Jalgaon banana. After filing the application in August 2014, the banana was granted the GI tag in 2016 by the Geographical Indication Registry in Chennai, making the name "Jalgaon Banana" exclusive to the bananas grown in the region. It thus became the first banana variety from Maharashtra and the 28th type of goods from Maharashtra to earn the GI tag.

The GI tag protects the banana from illegal selling and marketing, and gives it legal protection and a unique identity.

== See also ==
- Jalgaon Bharit Brinjal
