= Agassaim =

Agaçaim Agassaim
- Village
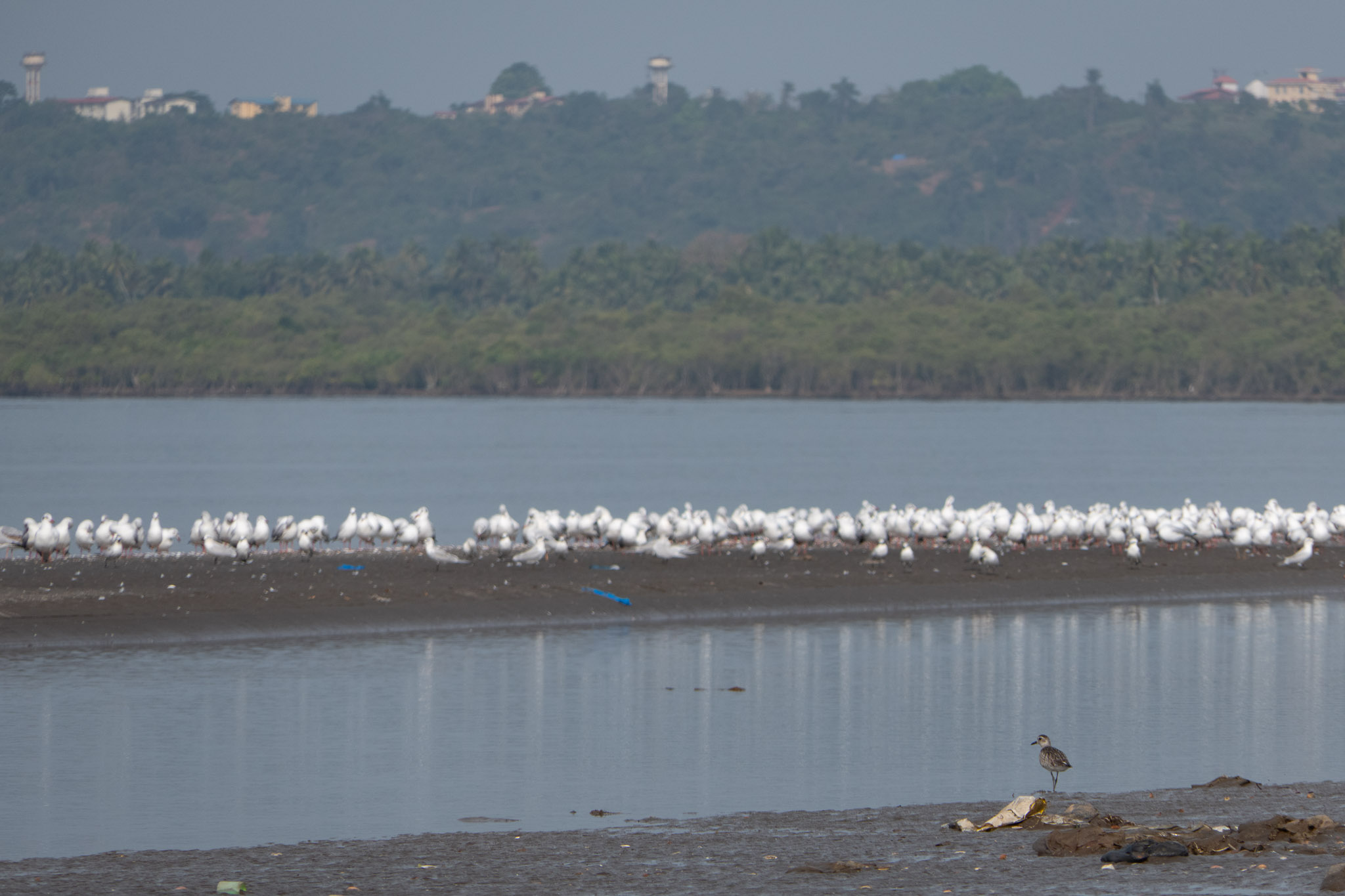

- Location of Agaçaim in Goa Agaçaim (India)
- Coordinates: 15°25′35″N 73°53′56″E
- Country: India
- State: Goa
- District: North Goa
- Sub-district: Ilhas de Goa
- Time zone: UTC+5:30 (IST)
- Postcode: 403204
- Area code: 0832
- Website: goa.gov.in

Agassaim (Portuguese: Agaçaim, Goan Konkani: Aagshi) is a village on the northern banks of the Zuari River in Tiswadi, Goa, surrounded by Panjim to the north, Margão to the south, Vasco da Gama to the west and Ponda to the east, thus making it a main connection between North Goa and South Goa via the Zuari Bridge. Agaçaim is famous for its Goan chouriço.

== Etymology ==
Agassaim or Agaçaim (Portuguese spelling) is named after "Aganashini" (lit. 'fire eraser'), the ancient name of the Zuari River, which the village is on the banks of.

== History ==
Agaçaim was a bazaar/mercado/market turned migrating Christian community on the fringes of the Indian Ocean and is attested by the discovery of stone crosses with Pahlavi (archaic Persian) inscription in several places along the west coast of India. The 2001 discovery of a granite stone cross by Father Cosme Costa, sfx, has been dated to the seventh century with a Pahlavi inscription.

Agassaim near Agaçaim has played a significant role in the political scene of Goa, be it the Save Goa Campaign or the Konkani language agitation in 1986. During these events, seven martyrs died for the Konkani language.

== Geographical indication ==
Agsechi Vayingim (Agassaim Brinjal) was awarded the Geographical Indication (GI) status tag from the Geographical Indications Registry, under the Union Government of India, on 31 July 2023 and is valid until 27 June 2031.

Agassaim Brinjal Growers and Sellers Association from Malwara Agassaim, proposed the GI registration of Agsechi Vayingim (Agassaim Brinjal). After filing the application in June 2021, the Brinjal was granted the GI tag in 2023 by the Geographical Indication Registry in Chennai, making the name "Agsechi Vayingim (Agassaim Brinjal)" exclusive to the Brinjal grown in the region. It thus became the first brinjal variety from Goa and the 6th type of goods from Goa to earn the GI tag.

The GI tag protects the brinjal from illegal selling and marketing, and gives it legal protection and a unique identity.
