= Nayagarh Kanteimundi brinjal =

Type of Brinjal variety from Odisha, India

Nayagarh Kanteimundi brinjal (କଣ୍ଟେଇମୁଣ୍ଡି ବାଇଗଣ)
- Geographical indication
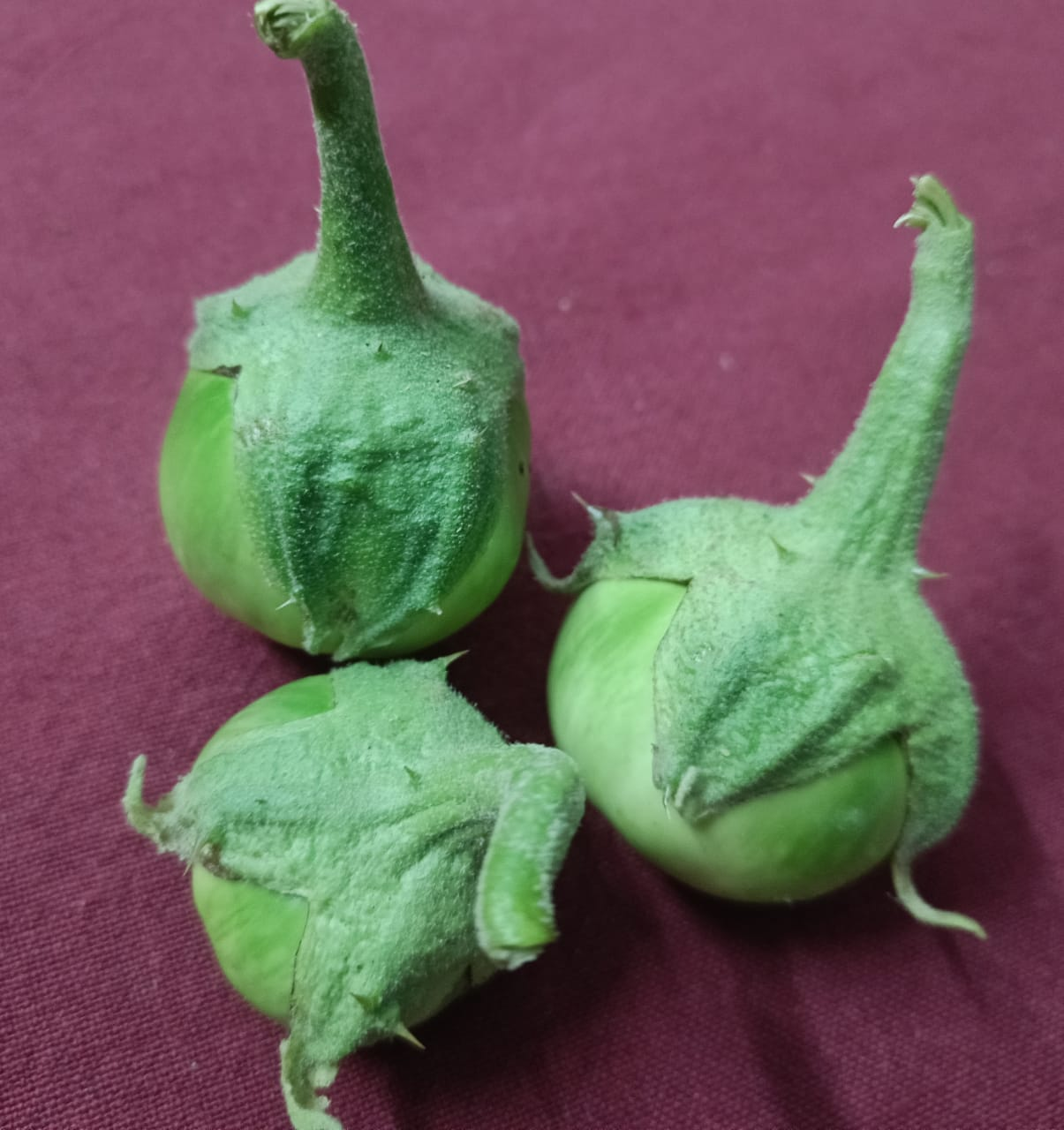
- Naayagarh Kanteimundi brinjal - close-up view
- Alternative names: Kanteimundi baaigan
- Description: Nayagarh Kanteimundi brinjal is a brinjal variety cultivated in Odisha
- Type: Brinjal
- Area: Nayagarh district
- Country: India
- Registered: 2 January 2024
- Official website: ipindia.gov.in

Nayagarh Kanteimundi brinjal is a variety of brinjal grown in the Indian state of Odisha. It is now a common and widely cultivated crop in the whole of Nayagarh district of Odisha. This brinjal variety was originally cultivated in the areas of Badabanapur, Ratanpur in Kandapada block, and Dhanchangda, Laxmiprasad, Kumundi, and Fategarh in Bhapur block.

Under its Geographical Indication tag, it is referred to as "Nayagarh Kanteimundi brinjal".

== Name ==
Nayagarh Kanteimundi brinjal is a prized vegetable crop in Nayagarh and so named after it. "Kante" means "Thorn" in the local state language of Odia while "mundi" means head. As per a survey, The word "Kanteimundi", is a name given by farmers in the locality called Kantilo, and based on the small, prickly thorns found on the stem, calyx, and the actual body of brinjal.

=== Local name ===
It is locally known as "Kanteimundi baaigan" (କଣ୍ଟେଇମୁଣ୍ଡି ବାଇଗଣ). "Baaigan" means "Brinjal" in Odia.

== Description ==
List of characteristics and facts about this brinjal variety:

=== Characteristics ===
- This variety is known for its unique taste and quick cooking quality. It is also resistant to pests and diseases. The main feature is that the plant is characterized by the presence of small prickly thorns on its stem, calyx, and fruit. Also the higher number of seeds which enhances flavor and cooking quality due to higher seed count.

=== Market and Cultivation ===
- The demand for this variety is increasing due to its market acceptability. As a result, the cultivated area is expanding. Additionally, it commands a higher price than other brinjal varieties.

=== Geographical Influence ===
- The quality of this variety is influenced by geographical conditions. Climate, rainfall, temperature, soil quality, and local agricultural practices all contribute to its unique characteristics.

== Geographical indication ==
It was awarded the Geographical Indication (GI) status tag from the Geographical Indications Registry, under the Union Government of India, on 2 January 2024 and is valid until 7 February 2031.

Neelamadhav Krushi Sanghathan from Banapur, proposed the GI registration of Nayagarh Kanteimundi brinjal. After filing the application in February 2021, the Brinjal was granted the GI tag in 2024 by the Geographical Indication Registry in Chennai, making the name "Nayagarh Kanteimundi brinjal" exclusive to the Brinjal grown in the region. It thus became the first brinjal variety from Odisha and the 23rd type of goods from Odisha to earn the GI tag.

The GI tag protects the brinjal from illegal selling and marketing, and gives it legal protection and a unique identity.

== Photo Gallery ==
Actual photos from Dr. Anil Kumar Swain (Sr. Scientist & Head, Krishi Vigyan Kendra Nayagarh, OUAT, Nayagarh) - among the original applicants for the GI Tag registration.

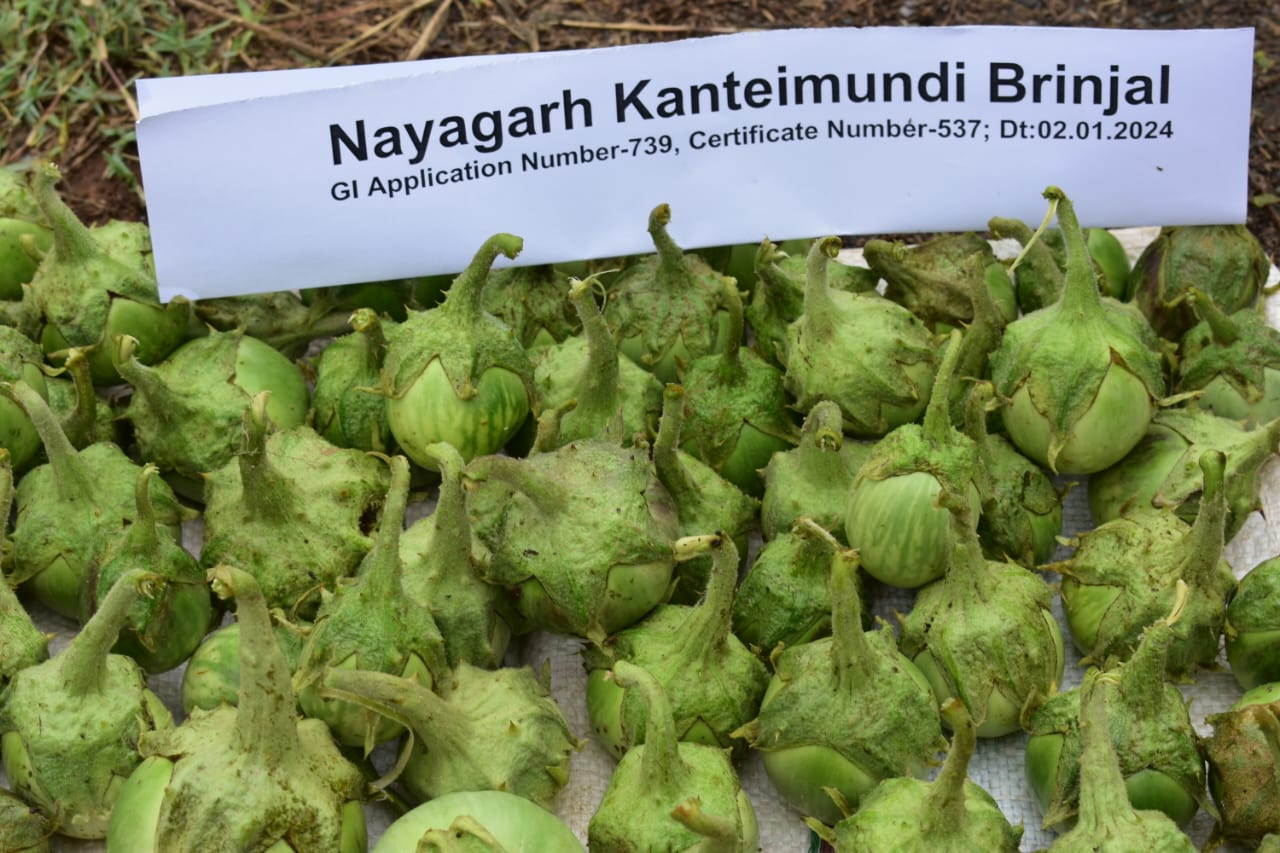
Nayagarh Kanteimundi brinjals on display at an event on 2nd January 2024

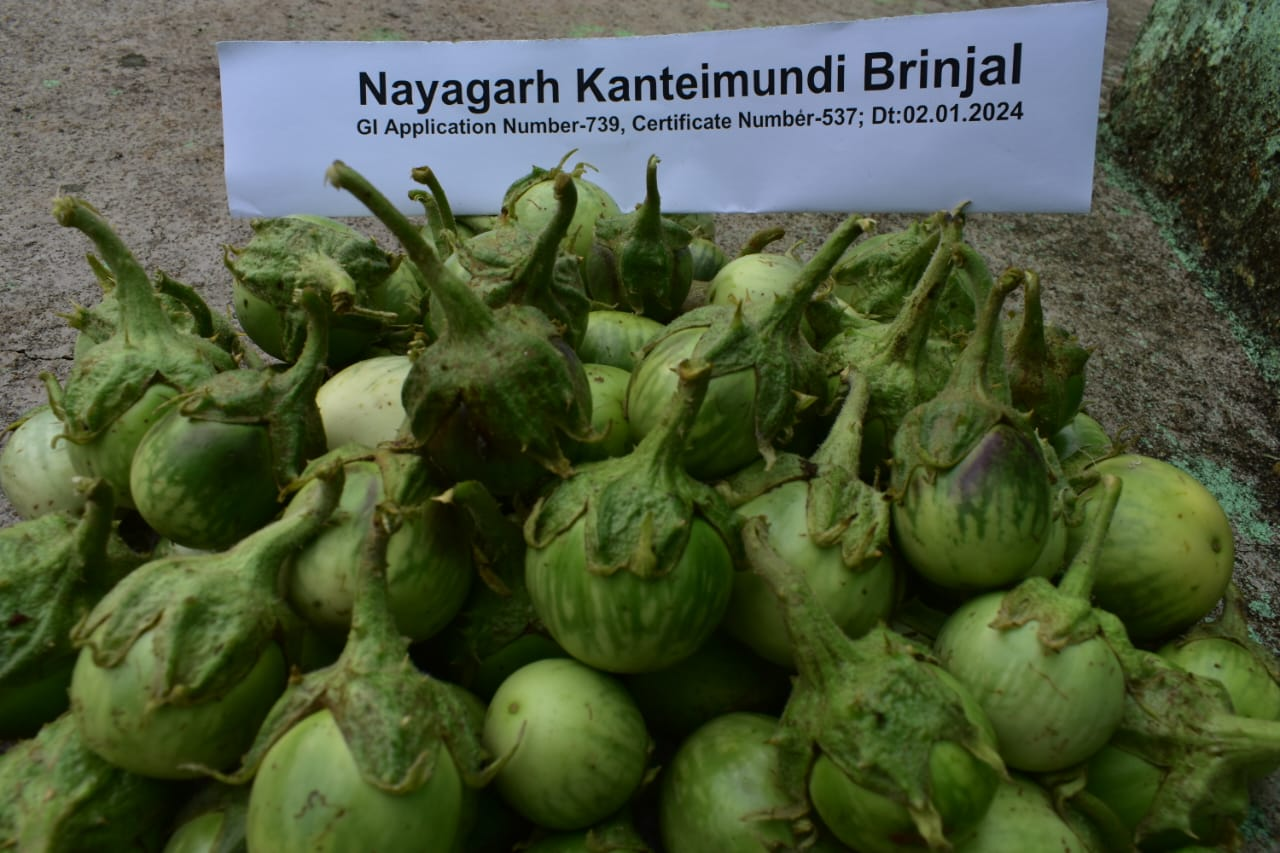
Nayagarh Kanteimundi brinjal - Another view

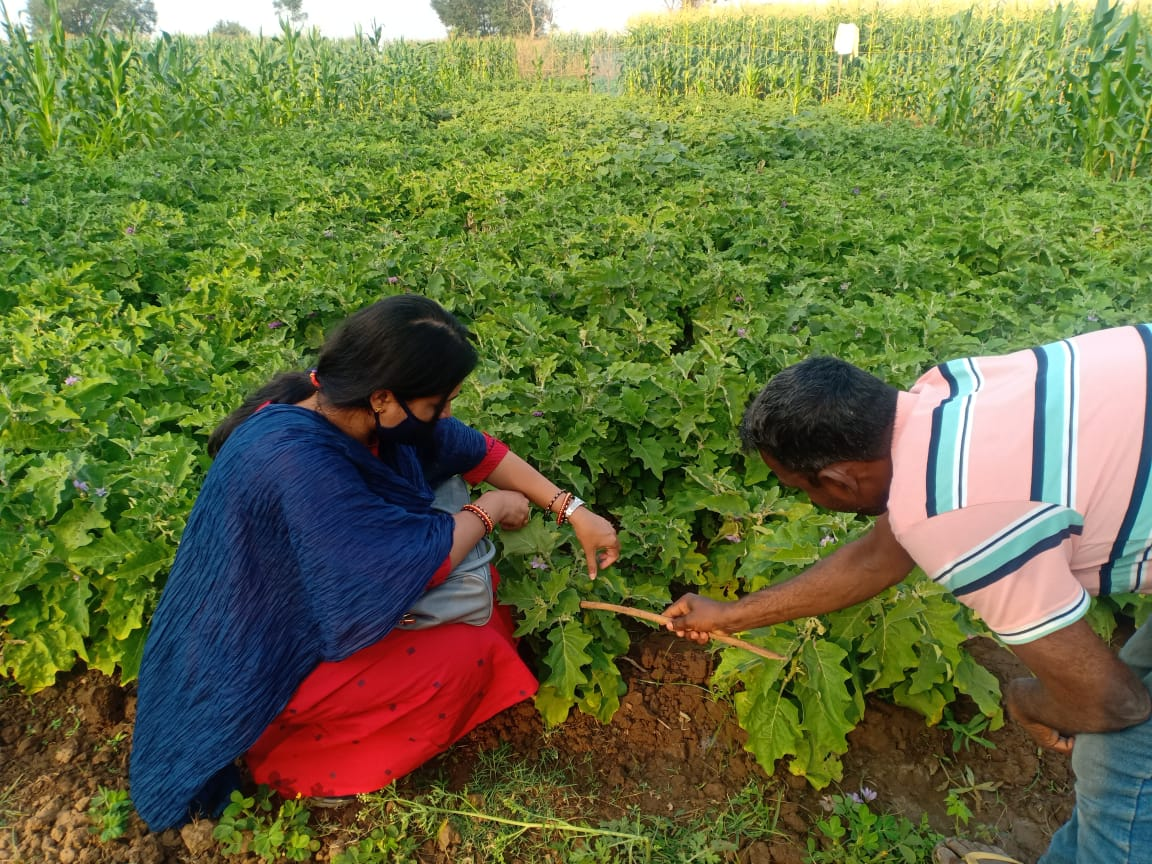
Agriculturists attending to the brinjal crop in a field

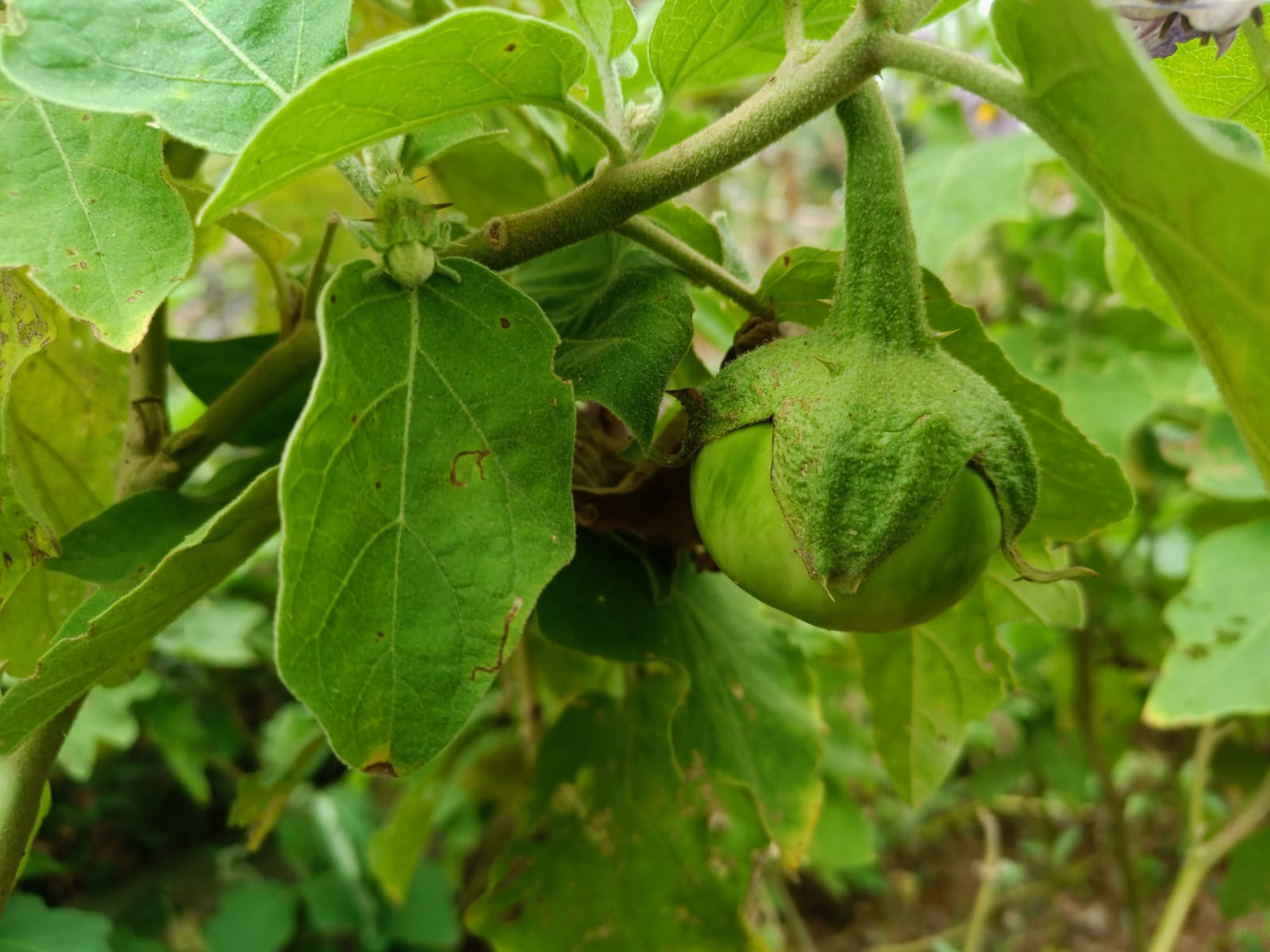
View of brinjal growing on plant

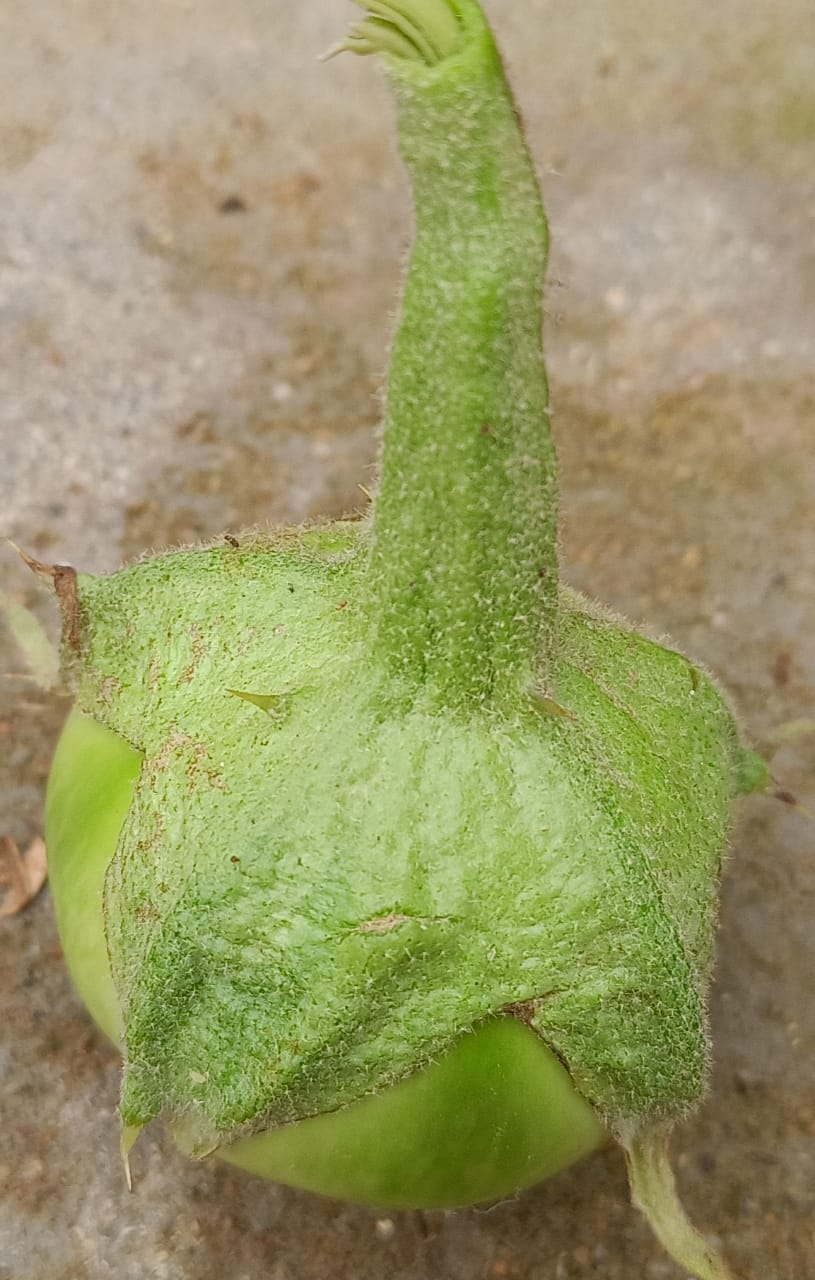
Brinjal freshly with thorns seen clearly on its calyx

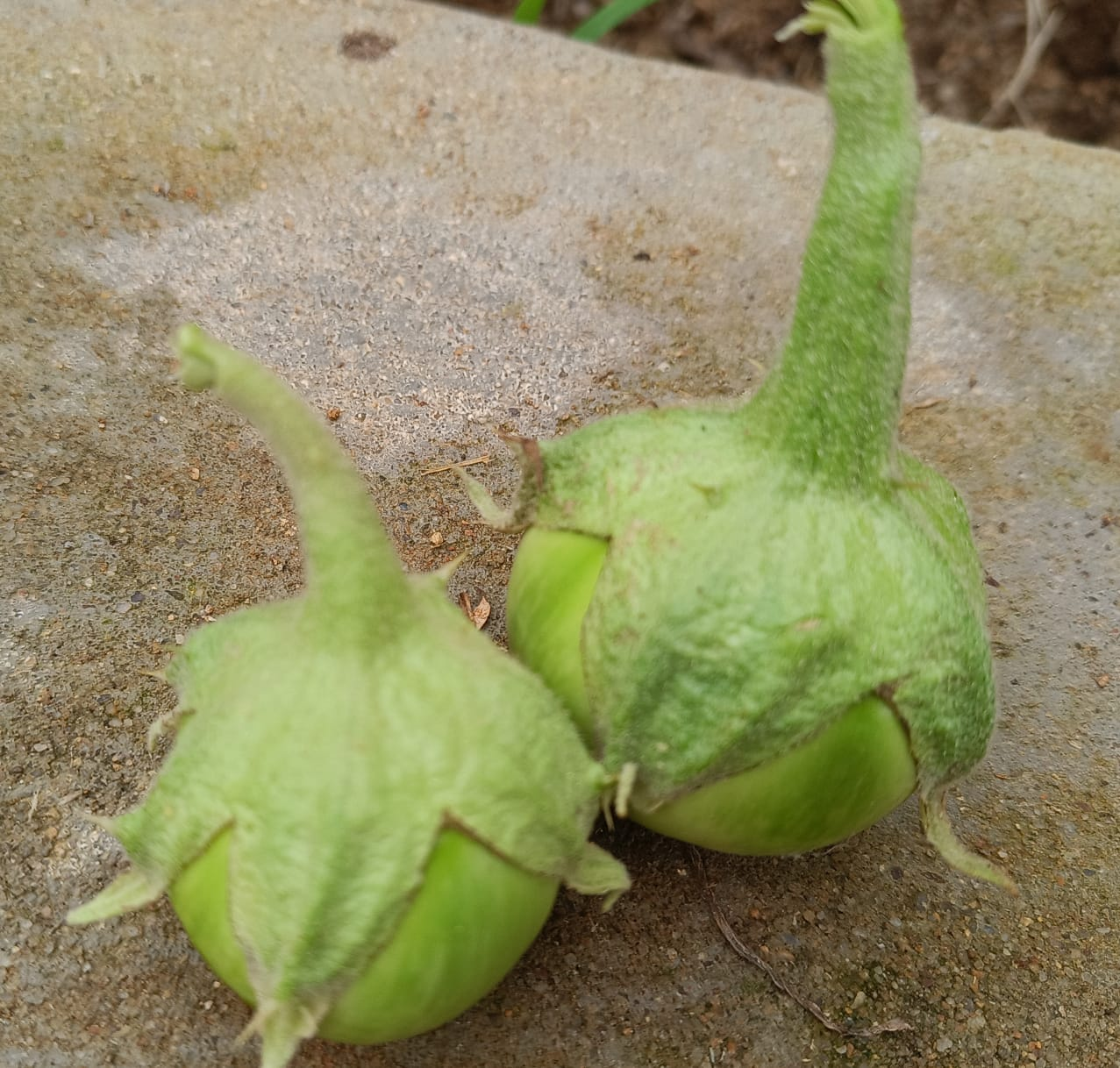
Brinjals freshly plucked

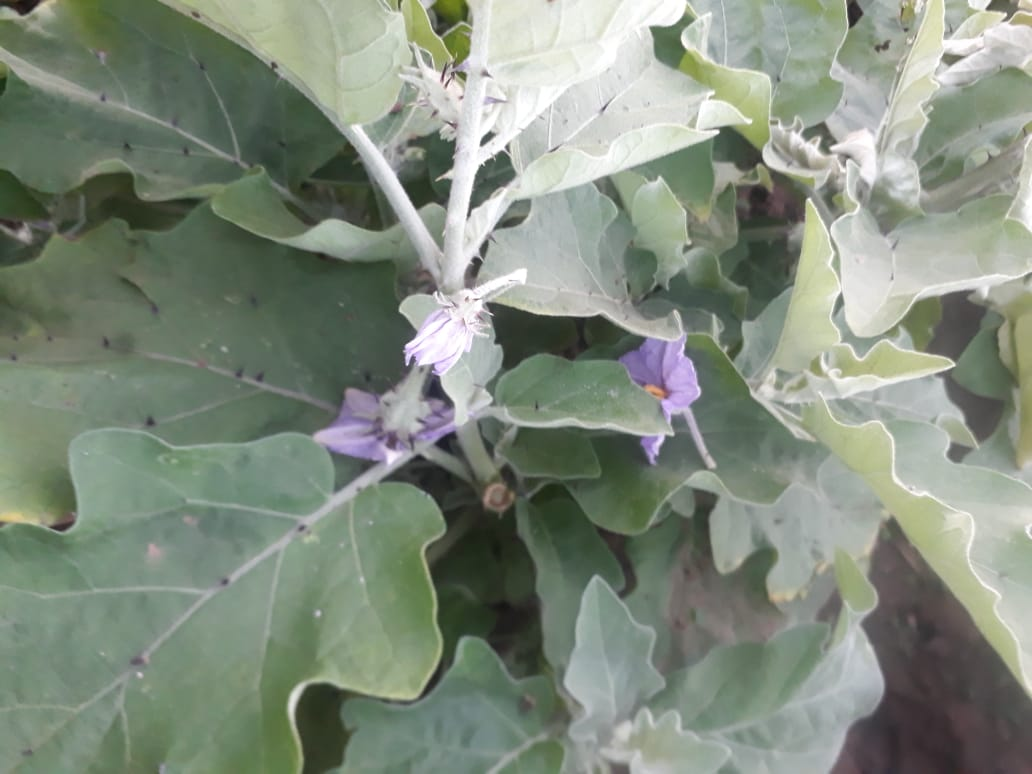
Close-up of Thorny leaves and purple flowers of the brinjal plant

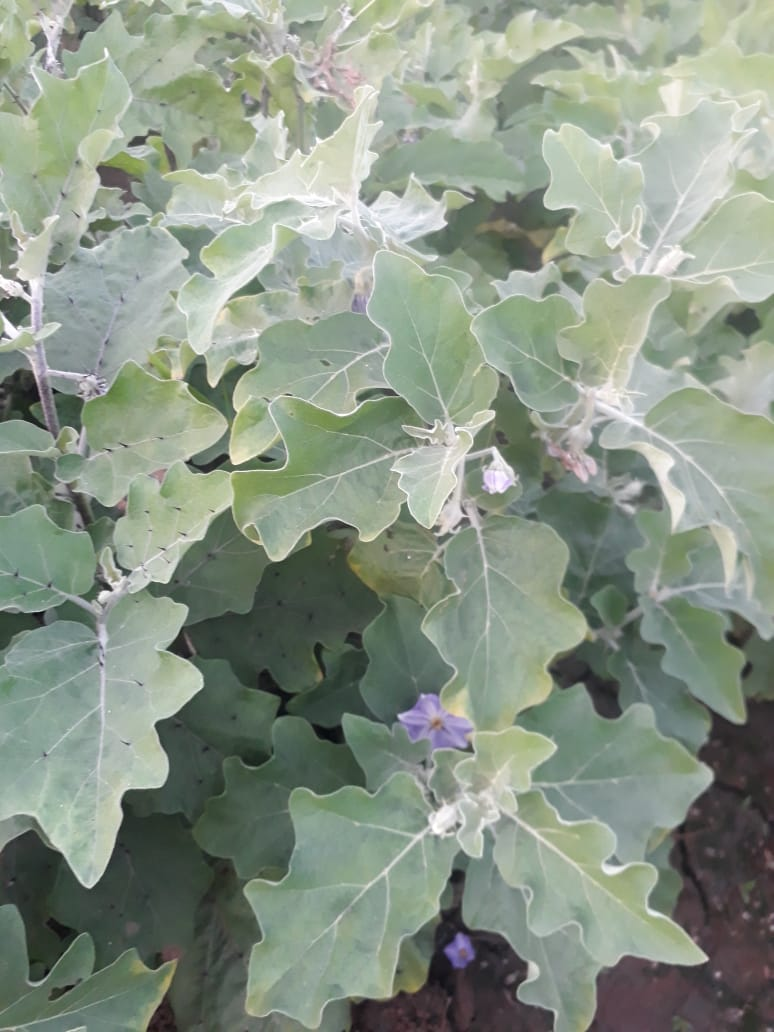
Another close-up of Thorny leaves and purple flowers of the brinjal plant

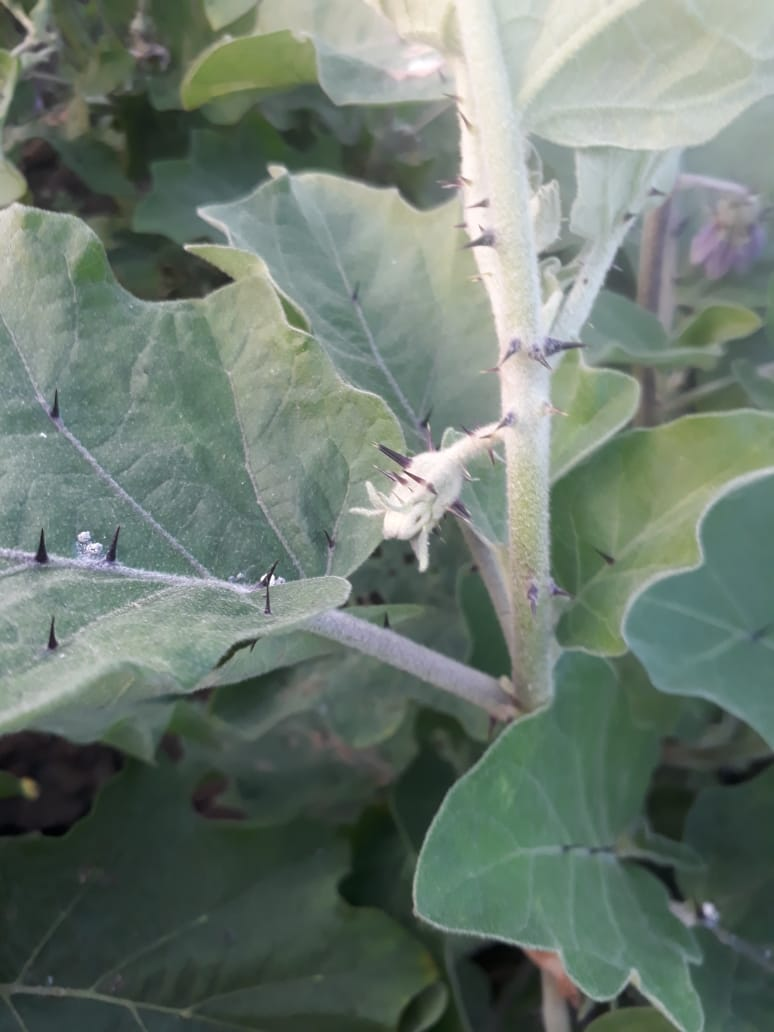
Close-up of Thorny leaves and stem of Nayagarh Kanteimundi brinjal

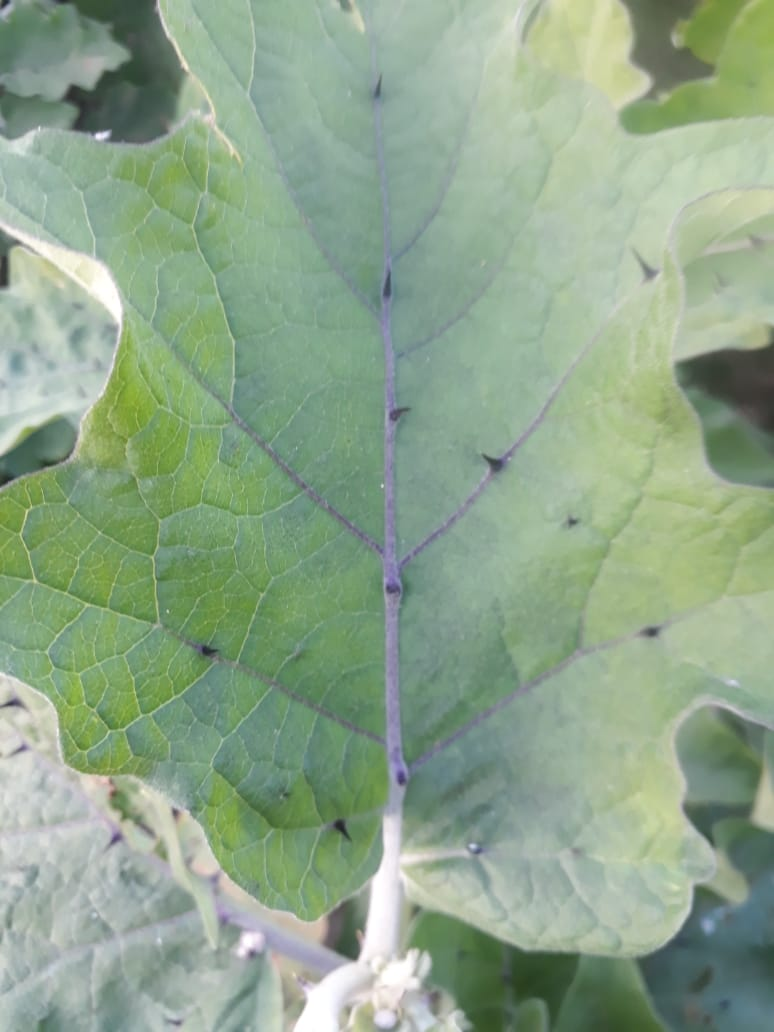
Close-up of Thorny leaves of the brinjal plant

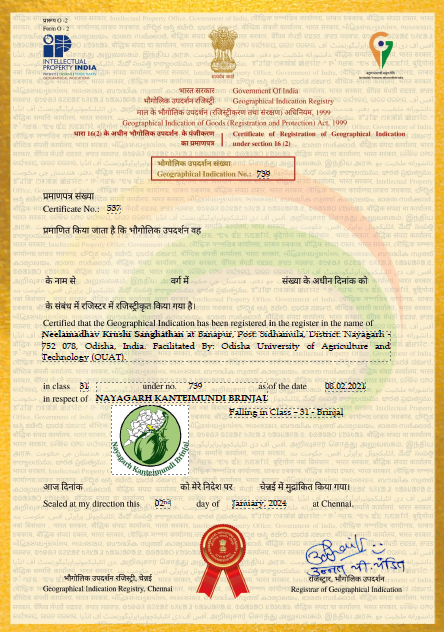
Geographical Indication Certificate

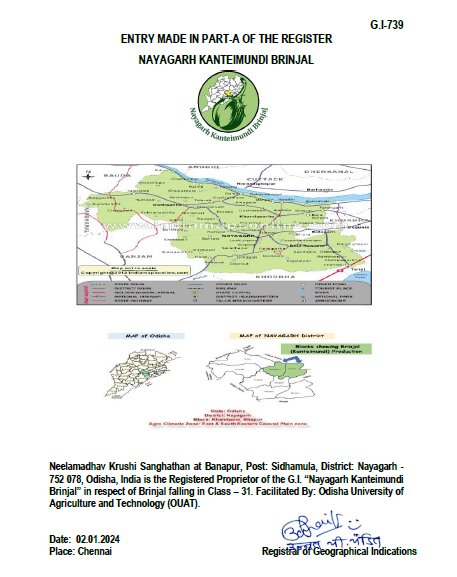
Logo and Geographical Indication area

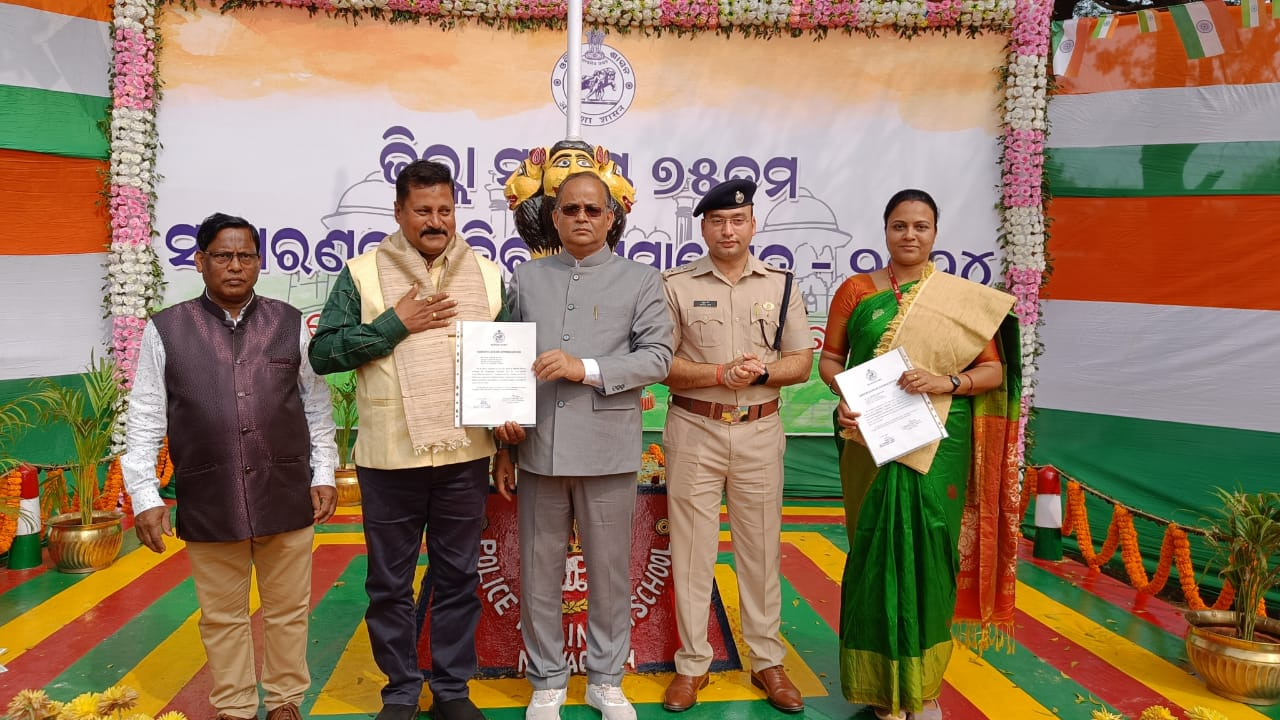
Dr. Anil Kumar Swain was honored with a Certificate of Appreciation by the Collector and District Magistrate of Nayagarh, recognizing his efforts in securing the prestigious GI certification for Nayagarh Kanteimundi brinjal.

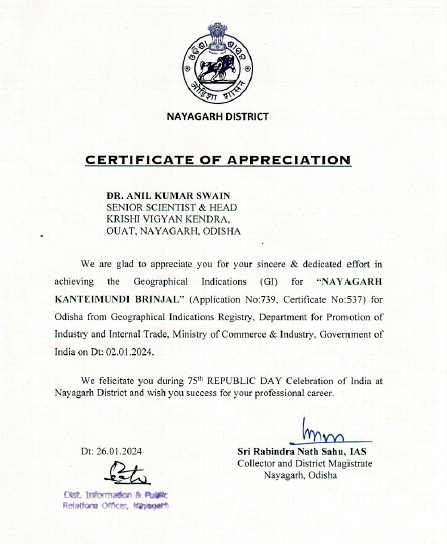
Certificate of Appreciation for securing GI certification for Nayagarh Kanteimundi brinjal.

== See also ==
- Agsechi Vayingim (Agassaim Brinjal)
- Vellore Spiny brinjal
- Jalgaon Bharit Brinjal
