= Agsechi Vayingim (Agassaim Brinjal) =

Type of Brinjal variety from Goa, India

Agassaim Brinjal
- Geographical indication
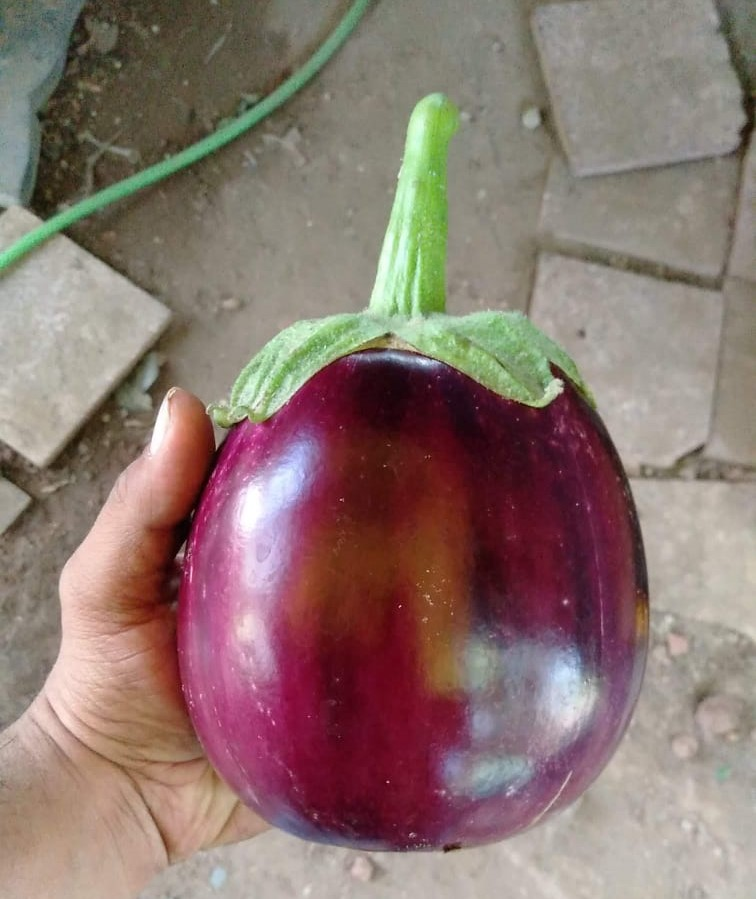
- Agsechi Vayingim (Agassaim Brinjal) closeup from a field in Agassaim village
- Alternative names: Agsechi Vayingim
- Description: Agsechi Vayingim (Agassaim Brinjal) is a brinjal variety cultivated in Goa
- Type: Brinjal
- Area: Agassaim village
- Country: India
- Registered: 31 July 2023
- Official website: ipindia.gov.in

Agassaim Brinjal is a variety of brinjal grown in the Indian state of Goa. It is a common and widely cultivated tropical vegetable crop in the village of Agassaim (Aagshi) located in Tiswadi taluka along with similar coastal parts of Tiswadi of North Goa district. It is also cultivated in the coastal parts of Mormugao and Salcete talukas in South Goa district.

Under its Geographical Indication tag, it is referred to as "Agsechi Vayingim (Agassaim Brinjal)".

== Name ==
Agassaim Brinjal is a prized vegetable crop in Agassaim and so named after it.

=== Local name ===
It is locally known as Agsechi Vayingim. "Agsechi" means "belonging to village of Aagshi" while "Vayingim" means "Brinjal" in Konkani - the local state language of Goa.

== Description ==
=== Characteristics ===
- This variety has an oblong, dark purple body, larger than other local varieties. It is soft and puffy, with more flesh and fewer seeds. Its unique taste and characteristics are due to the local soil and climate. The high soil fertility and good soil conditions also contribute to its productivity.

=== Cultivation ===
- The Agassaim Brinjal is primarily cultivated during the Rabi crop season in Agassaim village. Local farmers have been involved in its production for generations, preserving its uniqueness through traditional farming practices passed down over the years.

=== Culinary uses ===
- The Agassaim Brinjal is used in various dishes, including curries and roasted preparations. It's particularly well-suited for making Bharate, a traditional dish where roasted brinjal is crushed and mixed with onion, garlic, green chili, and a pinch of salt.

== Photo Gallery ==
Actual photos from an agriculturist from Agassaim village - among the original applicants for the GI Tag registration.

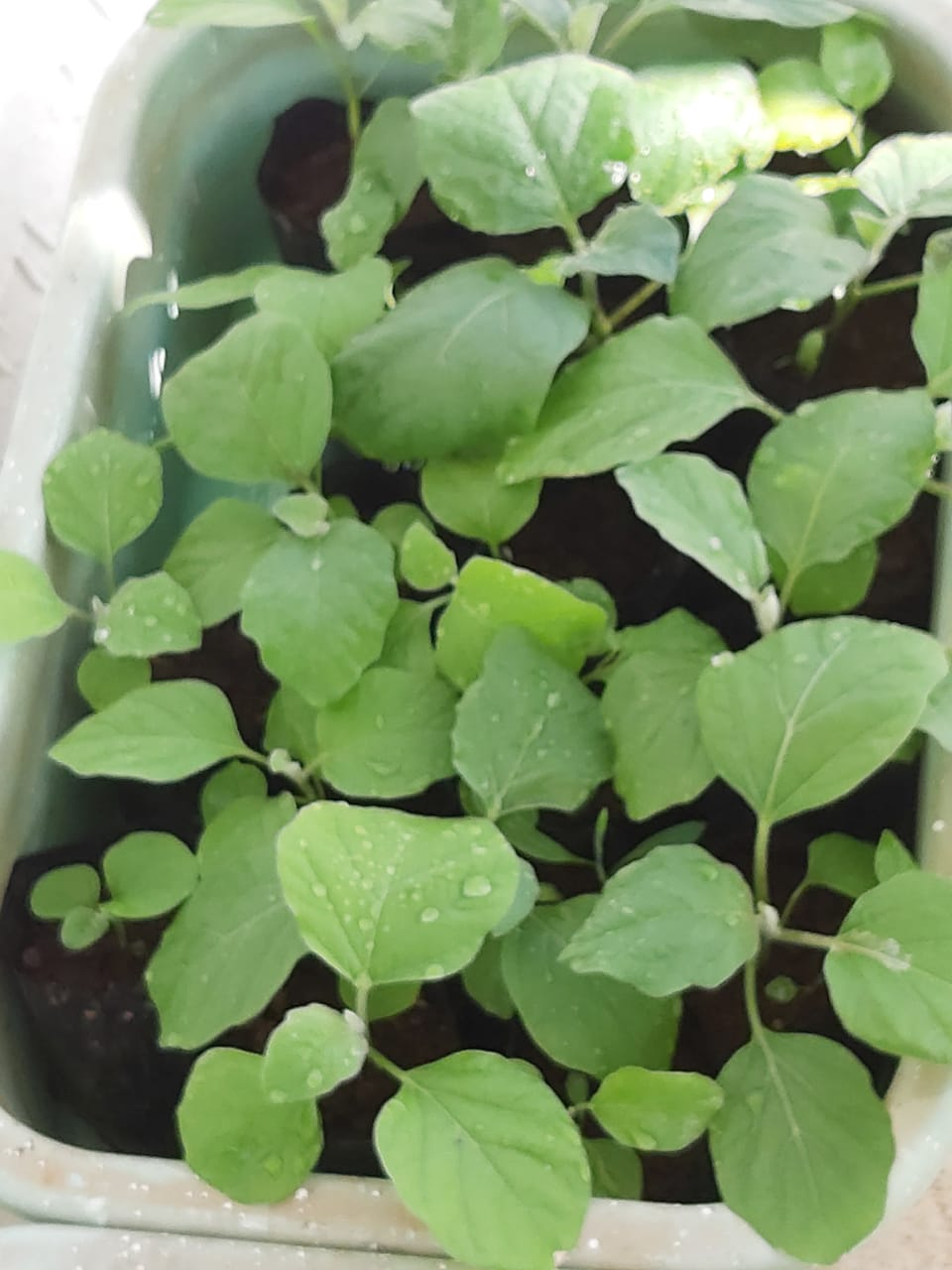
Agassaim Brinjal saplings

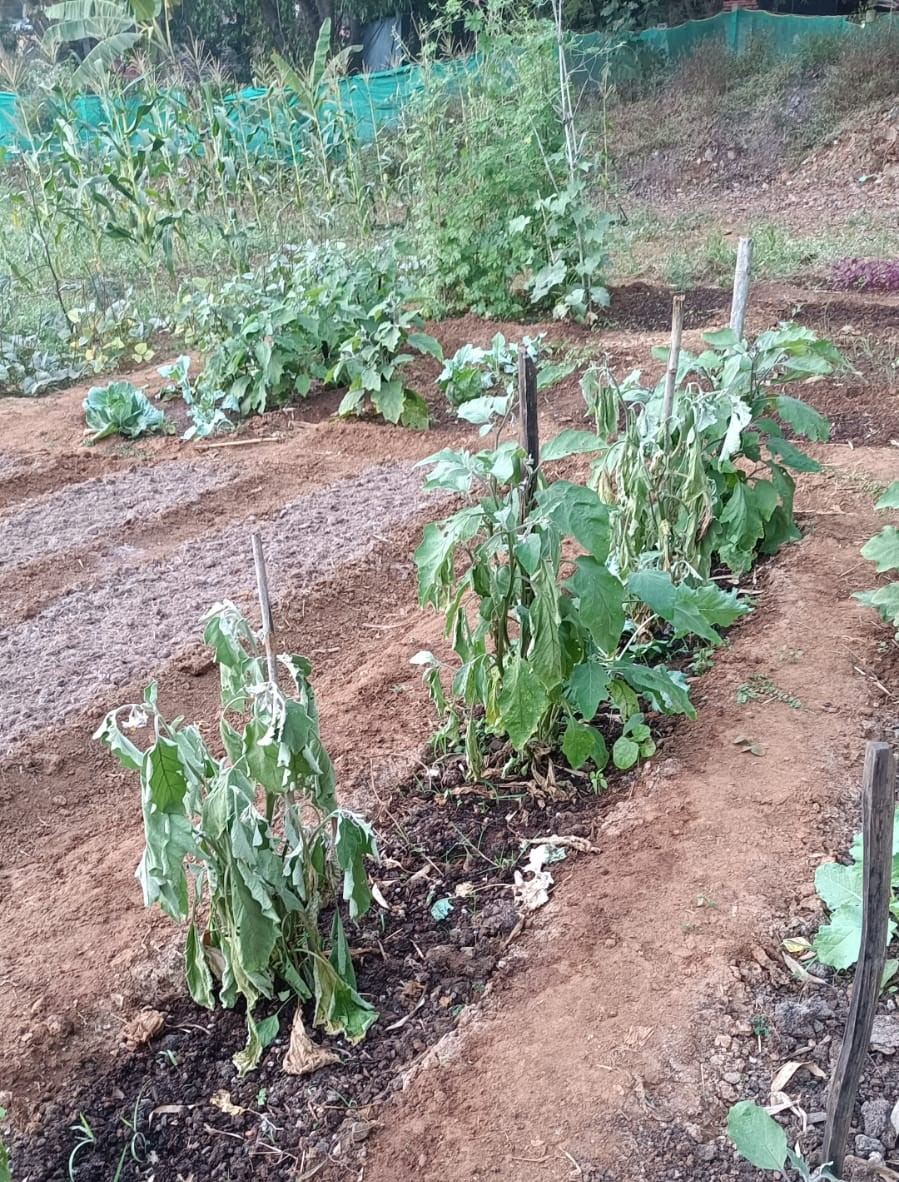
Agassaim Brinjal field

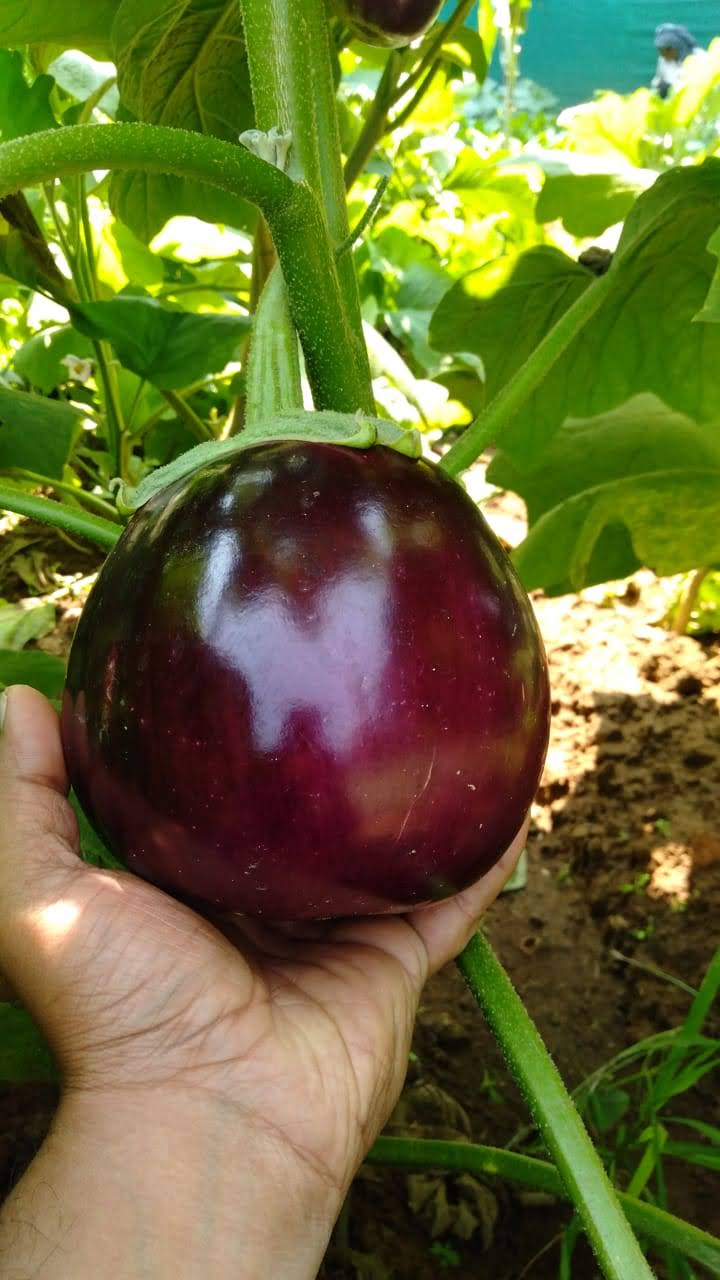
Unplucked brinjals in a field

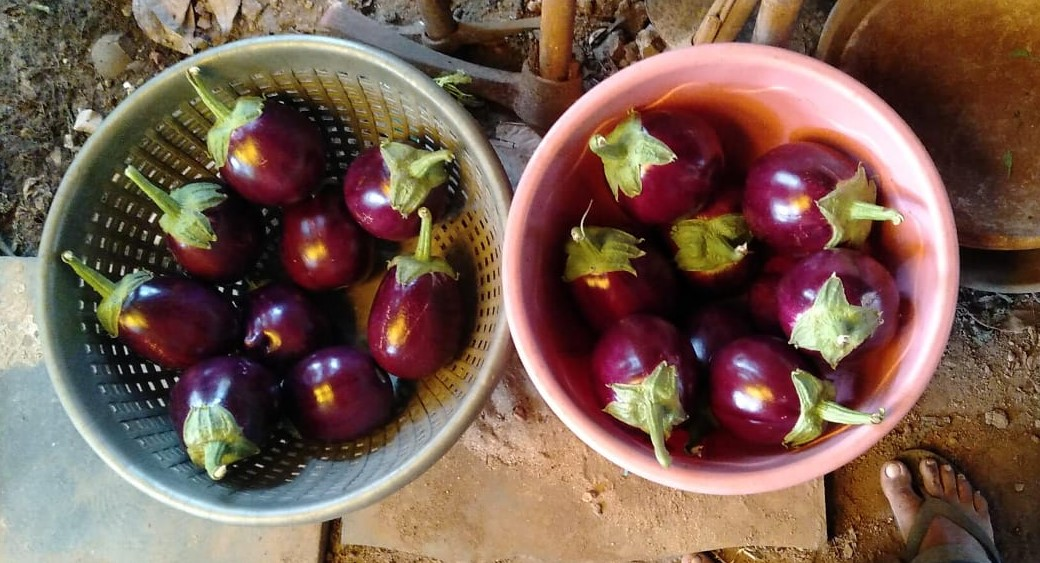
Freshly plucked brinjals from the field

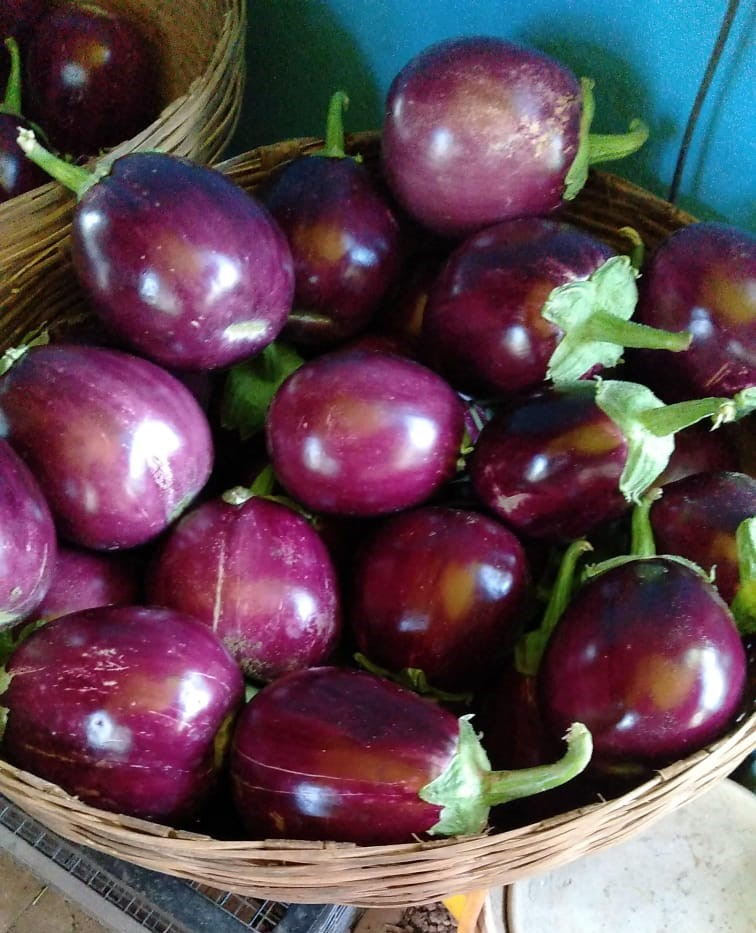
Another photo of plucked brinjals

== Geographical indication ==
It was awarded the Geographical Indication (GI) status tag from the Geographical Indications Registry, under the Union Government of India, on 31 July 2023 and is valid until 27 June 2031.

Agassaim Brinjal Growers and Sellers Association from Malwara Agassaim, proposed the GI registration of Agsechi Vayingim (Agassaim Brinjal). After filing the application in June 2021, the Brinjal was granted the GI tag in 2023 by the Geographical Indications Registry in Chennai, making the name "Agsechi Vayingim (Agassaim Brinjal)" exclusive to the Brinjal grown in the region. It thus became the first brinjal variety from Goa and the 6th type of goods from Goa to earn the GI tag.

The GI tag protects the brinjal from illegal selling and marketing, and gives it legal protection and a unique identity.

== See also ==
- Jalgaon Bharit Brinjal
- Vellore Spiny brinjal
- Nayagarh Kanteimundi brinjal
