= Jalgaon Bharit Brinjal =

Type of Brinjal variety from Maharashtra, India

Jalgaon Bharit Brinjal (जळगाव भरीत वांगी)
- Geographical indication
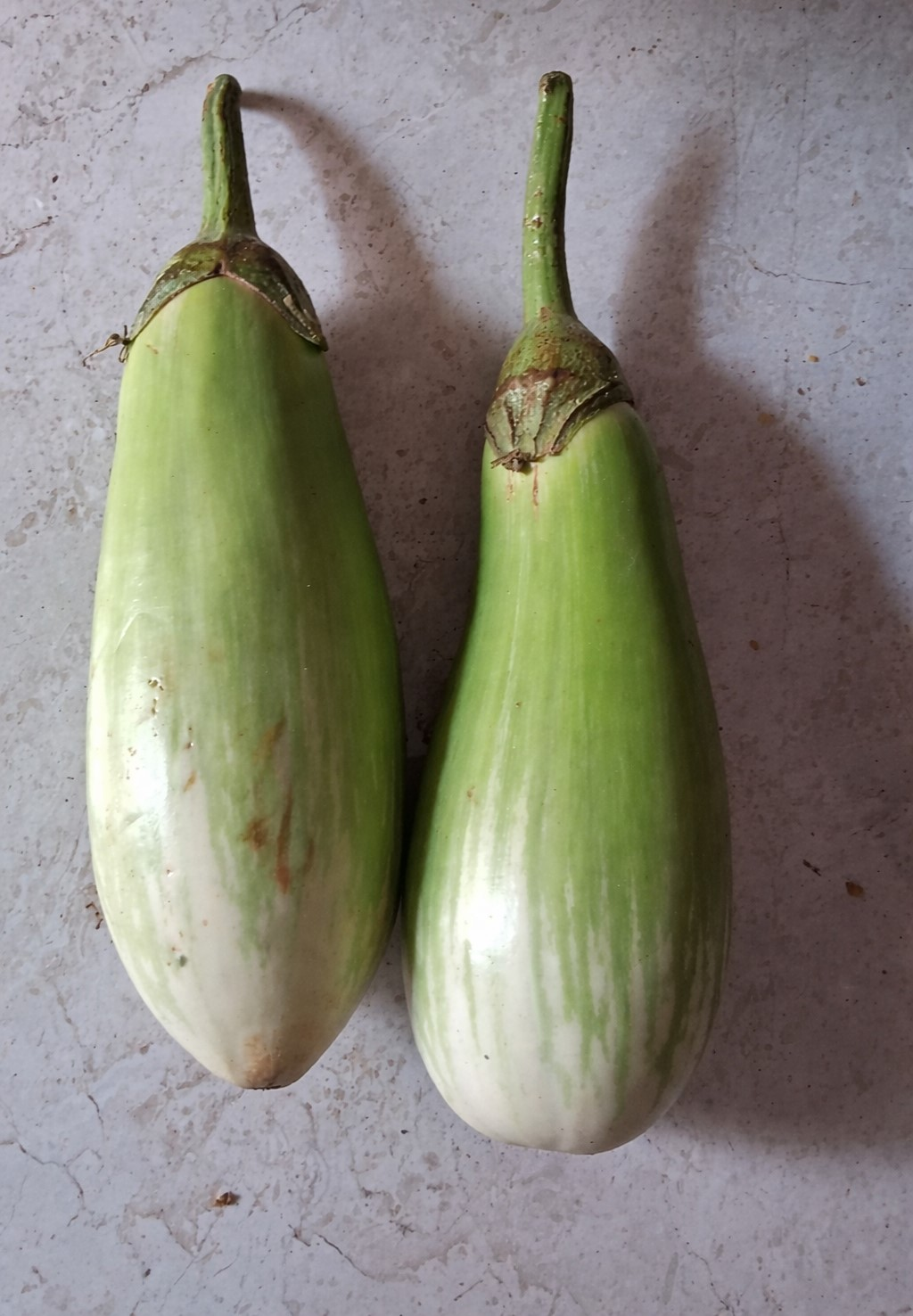
- Jalgaon Bharit Brinjals Light Green Variety from Adgaon located in Jalgaon
- Alternative names: Bharit Vangi
- Description: Jalgaon Bharit Brinjal is a brinjal variety cultivated in Maharashtra
- Type: Brinjal
- Area: Jalgaon district
- Country: India
- Registered: 3 June 2016
- Official website: ipindia.gov.in

Jalgaon Bharit Brinjal is a variety of brinjal grown in the Indian state of Maharashtra. It is a common and widely cultivated crop in areas like Asoda, Bamnod, Mamurabad, Bhadli, Bhalod and Bhusaval of Jalgaon district located in the Khandesh region of North Maharashtra.

Under its Geographical Indication tag, it is referred to as "Jalgaon Bharit Brinjal".

== Name ==
Jalgaon Bharit Brinjal is a prized vegetable crop in Jalgaon and so named after it. The word "Bharit" refers to a traditional spicy dish, specifically "Khandeshi Bharit", which is made using Jalgaon Brinjal. The word "Bharit" means mashing or mincing grilled Brinjal with tomato, onion, herbs and spices in the local state language of Marathi.

=== Local name ===
It is locally known as Bharit Vangi (भरीत वांगी).

== Description ==
List of characteristics and facts about Jalgaon Bharit Brinjal:

=== Characteristics ===
- This variety is large in size with soft skin, weighing between 500g to 2500g, and has a less number of seeds inside the pulp. The shape is long, oval, and slender, with distinct coloration of pale green with white stripes.

=== Cultivation ===
- The presence of fertile, rich, medium black soil and a favorable climate support cultivation. This traditional variety has been preserved and maintained by farmers for over five centuries.

=== Uses ===
- Specifically used for making traditional spicy dish 'Khandeshi Bharit'

== Photo Gallery ==
Actual photos from a Jalgaon Bharit Brinjal farmer from Adgaon.

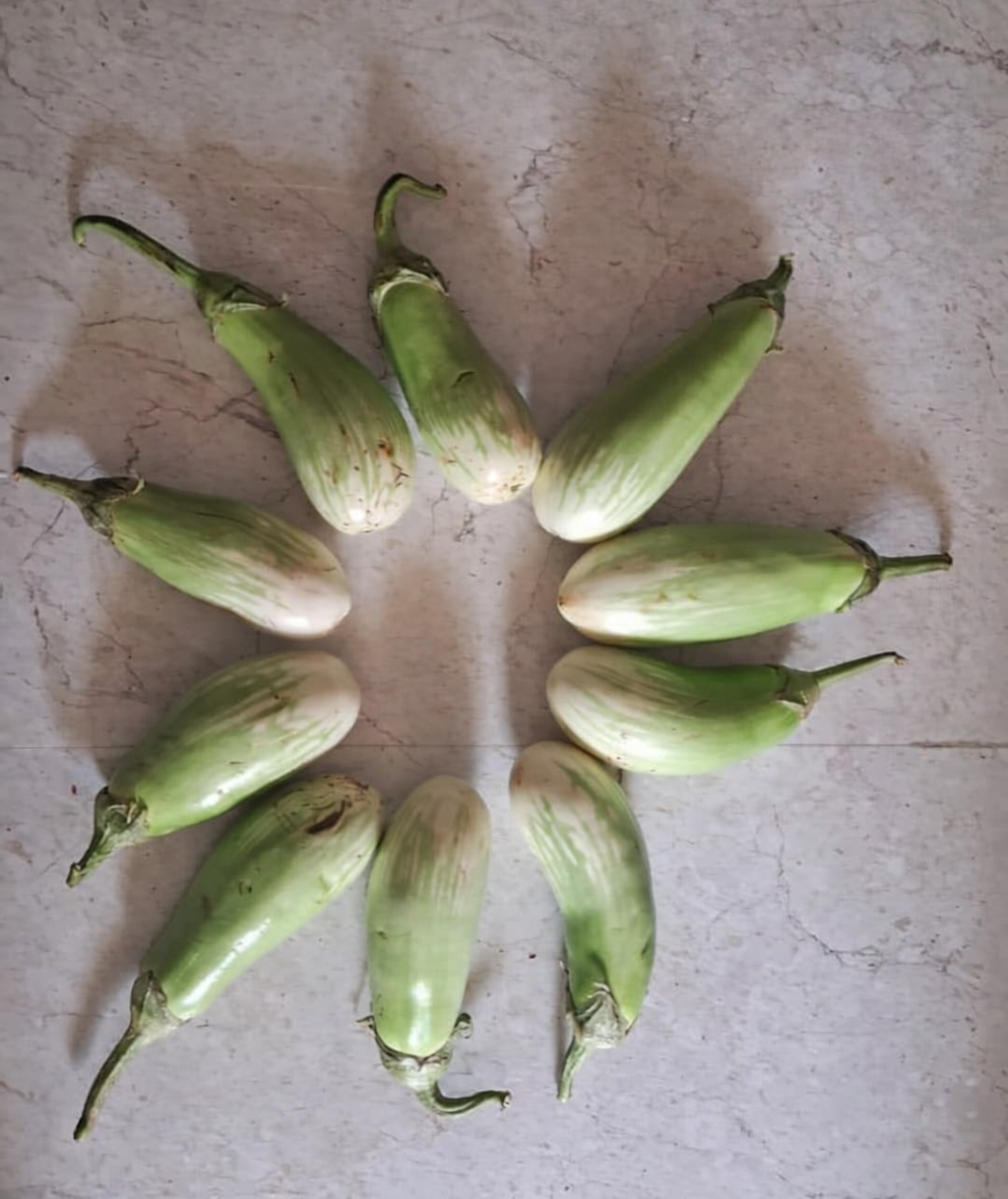
Jalgaon Bharit brinjal arranged after harvest; a local eggplant cultivar from Jalgaon district, Maharashtra

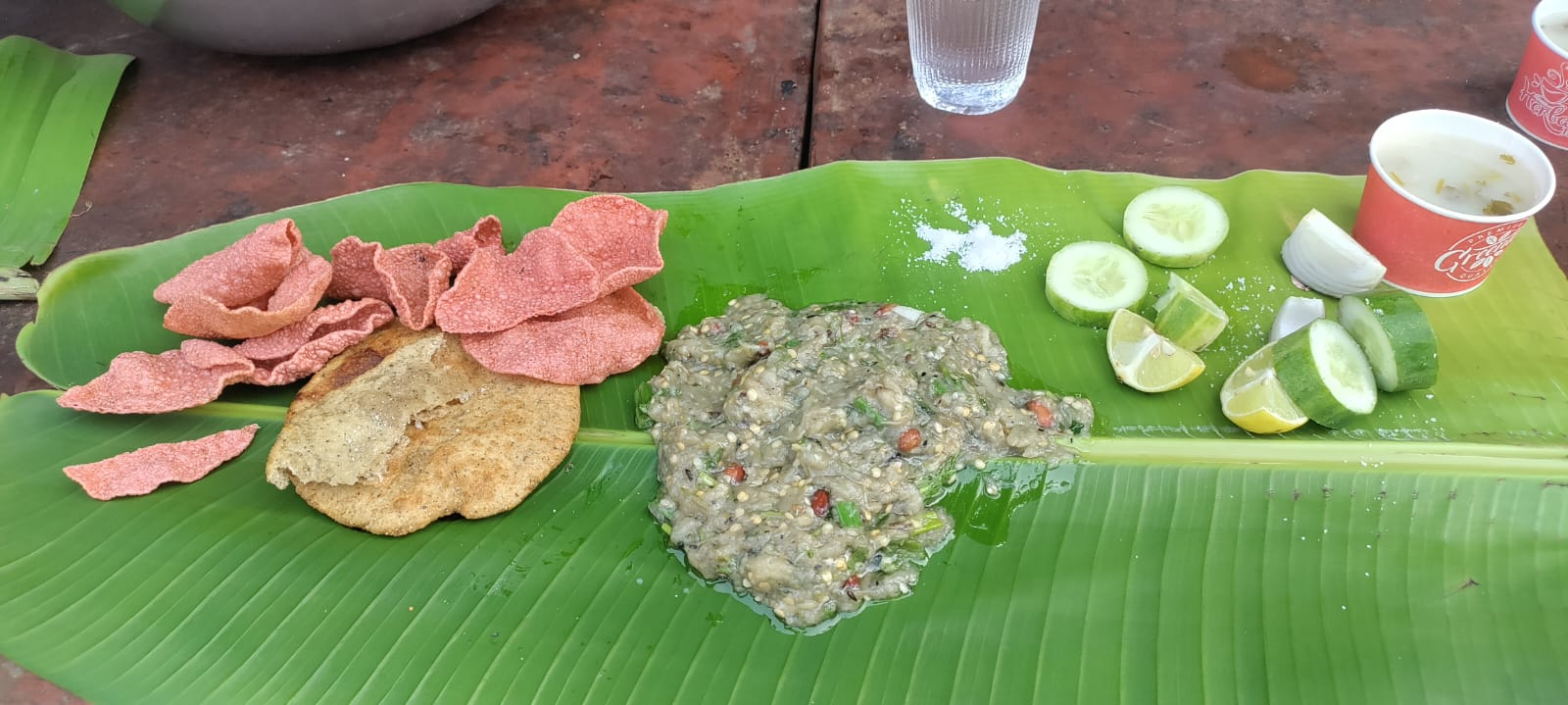
Jalgaon-style meal on a banana leaf with papads, puris, Jalgaon Bharit—a smoky mashed brinjal dish—served with onions, cucumber, and lemon

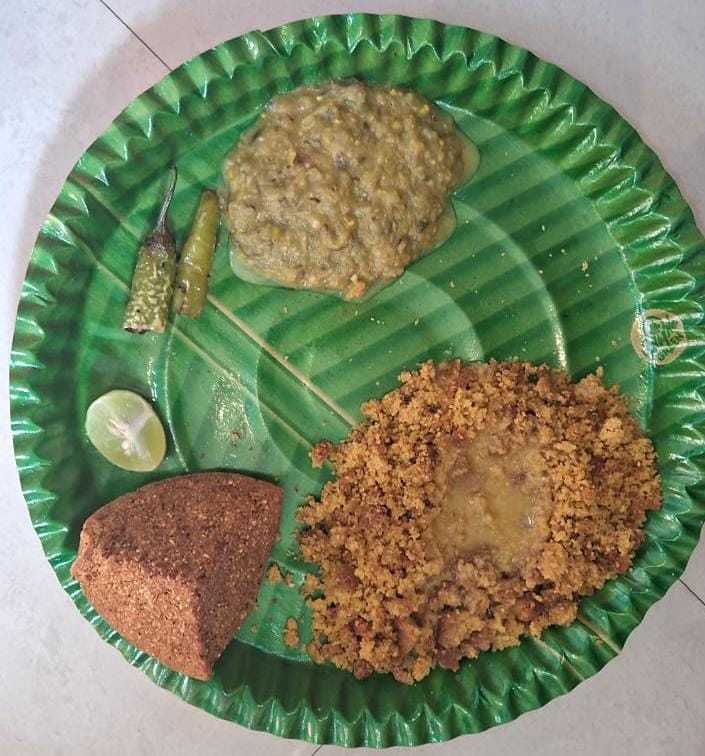
Batti (baked wheat balls), served whole and in crushed form, with Jalgaon Bharit—a smoky, spicy mashed brinjal dish—traditionally accompanied by green chillies and lemon

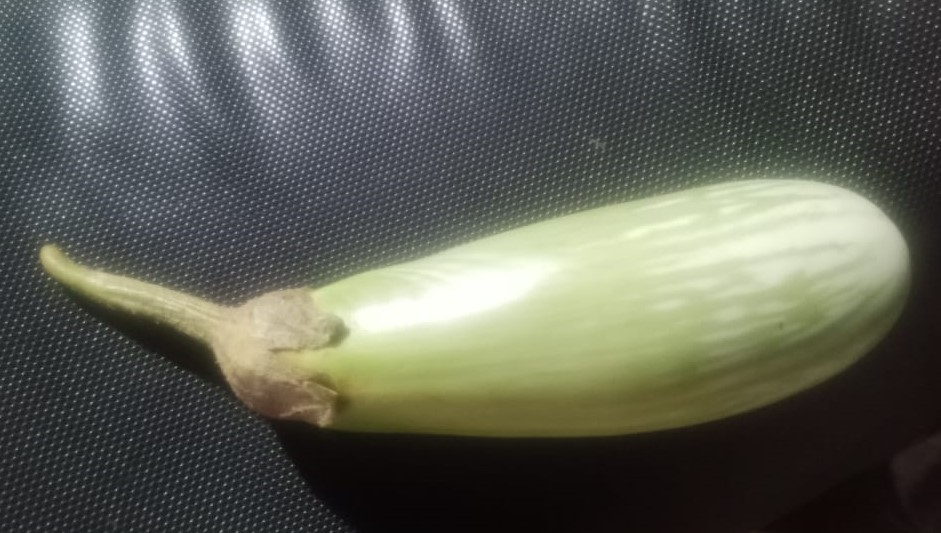
Close-up of Jalgaon Bharit Brinjal from Amalner Tehsil of Jalgaon

== Geographical indication ==
It was awarded the Geographical Indication (GI) status tag from the Geographical Indications Registry, under the Union Government of India, on 3 June 2016 and is valid until 29 September 2024.

Navnirmiti Shetkari Mandal from Asoda, proposed the GI registration of Jalgaon Bharit Brinjal. After filing the application in September 2014, the Brinjal was granted the GI tag in 2016 by the Geographical Indications Registry in Chennai, making the name "Jalgaon Bharit Brinjal" exclusive to the Brinjal grown in the region. It thus became the first brinjal variety from Maharashtra and the 23rd type of goods from Maharashtra to earn the GI tag.

The GI tag protects the brinjal from illegal selling and marketing, and gives it legal protection and a unique identity.

== See also ==
- Agsechi Vayingim (Agassaim Brinjal)
- Vellore Spiny brinjal
- Nayagarh Kanteimundi brinjal
- Jalgaon banana
