= Almora Lakhori Mirchi =

Chilli variety grown in Uttarakhand, India

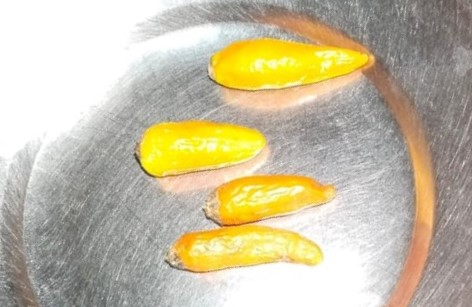
- Closeup of Almora Mirchi
- Species: Capsicum annuum
- Origin: Uttarakhand, India
- Scoville scale: 50,000-55,000 SHU

The Almora Lakhori Mirchi is a variety of chilli grown in the Indian state of Uttarakhand. It is Uttarakhand's favourite home-grown chilli.

== Name ==
It is named after its place of origin, the region of Almora, located in Kumaon division of Uttarakhand while Mirchi means Chilli - in the local Hindi language. It is called simply as Lakhori or Lakhor.

The etymology of "Lakhori" mirch traces back to Lakhora, a village on the Garhwal-Kumaon border of Uttarakhand, where this unique chili variety was first cultivated.

== Description ==
Lakhori mirch is characterized by its yellow color and distinctive wrinkles that appear during the drying process. This variety is classified into two sizes: the smaller Lakhori Jamri, renowned for its high seed content and use in mirchi flake production; and the larger size, commonly employed whole or powdered for various culinary purposes. It is also used in making Lakhori yellow chilli salt (Pahadi coloured salt - flavored salt).

Almora Lakhori Mirchi, is characterized by its blunt tip, compact seeds, and extremely hot flavor profile, making it suitable for use in small quantities. Traditionally sun-dried, this mirchi can be stored year-round and is highly sought after by namkeen makers for flavoring chips and namkeens, as its yellow color blends well with snacks. In mountain regions, Almora Lakhori Mirchi is preferred over red chilies due to perceived health benefits, making it a popular substitute.

== Photo/ Video Gallery ==
Actual photos from a chilli farm.

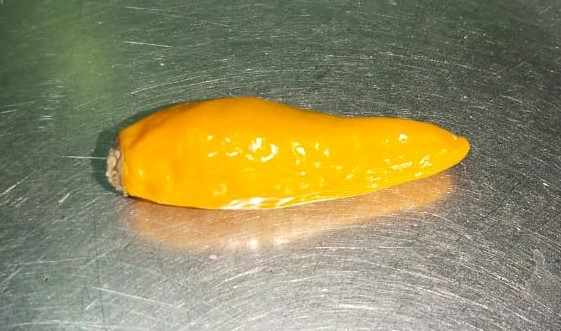
Another closeup of Almora Lakhori Mirchi

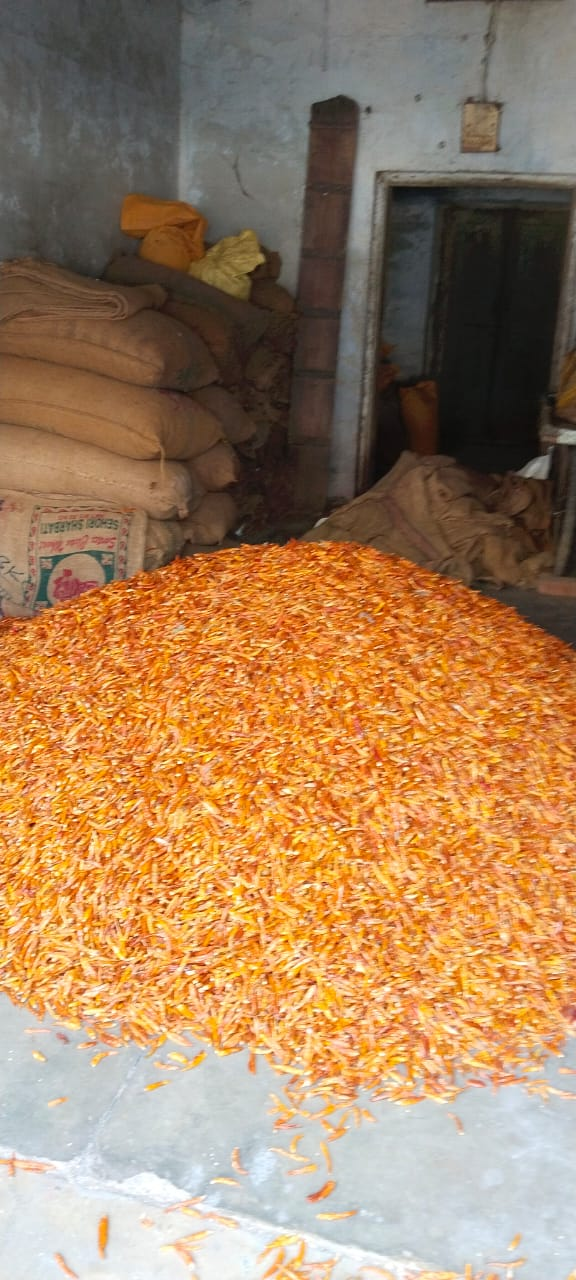
Almora Lakhori Mirchi at a storage facility

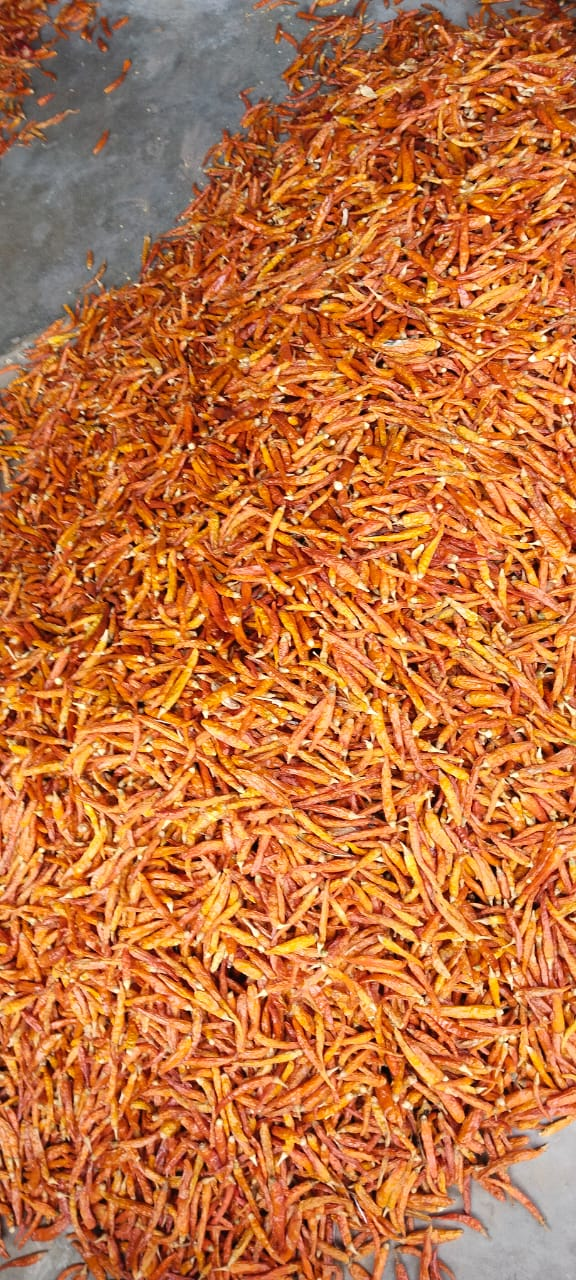
Another photo of Almora Lakhori Mirchi at a storage facility.

Almora Lakhori Mirchi collection on a farm

== Geographical indication ==
It was awarded the Geographical Indication (GI) status tag from the Geographical Indications Registry under the Union Government of India on 8 November 2023. d Chokot Patti Farmers Producer Company Limited from Almora, proposed the GI registration of Almora Lakhori Mirchi. After filing the application on 11 April 2022, the chilli was granted the GI tag in 2023 by the Geographical Indication Registry in Chennai, making the name "Almora Lakhori Mirchi" exclusive to the chilies grown in the region. It thus became the first chilli variety from Uttarakhand and the 19th type of goods from Uttarakhand to earn the GI tag.

== See also ==
- Nandurbar Mirchi
- Bhiwapur chilli
