= Borsuri =

Village in Latur, Maharashtra

- Village
- Location in Maharashtra, India Borsuri (India)
- Coordinates: 18.01°N 76.85°E
- Country: India
- State: Maharashtra
- District: Latur district
- Taluka: Nilanga

Languages
  - Official: Marathi
- Time zone: UTC+5:30 (IST)
- PIN: 413522

Borsuri is a village in the Nilanga taluka of Latur district located in Maharashtra State, India.

== Farming ==
Borsuri Tur Dal is a local variety of pigeon pea cultivated in this village that is white in color. Borsuri is known for its cultivation belt of tur dal, which boasts a distinct nutritional profile and is in high demand, particularly in Delhi and Mumbai. The medium black soil in these river basins is highly fertile and suitable for Tur cultivation, resulting in high yields.

== Notable dish ==
Borsuri Varan/ Bhokari Varan (Lentil curry or stew) is a spicy and popular Marathwada dish made with a mix of lentils, including Borsuri tur dal, Masoor dal, and green Moong dal, along with spices and other ingredients.

== Geographical indication ==
Borsuri Tur Dal was awarded the Geographical Indication (GI) status tag from the Geographical Indications Registry, under the Union Government of India, on 30 March 2024 and is valid until 6 February 2032.

Borsuri Turdal Utpadak Sangh from Borsuri, proposed the GI registration of 'Borsuri Tur Dal'. After filing the application in February 2022, the Tur Dal was granted the GI tag in 2024 by the Geographical Indication Registry in Chennai, making the name "'Borsuri Tur Dal" exclusive to the Tur Dal cultivated in the region. It thus became the second pigeon pea variety from Maharashtra after Navapur Tur Dal and the 45th type of goods from Maharashtra to earn the GI tag.

The GI tag protects the Tur Dal from illegal selling and marketing, and gives it legal protection and a unique identity.
