= Nandurbar Amchur =

Type of dried unripe mango powder variety from Maharashtra, India

Nandurbar Amchur (नंदुरबारचा अमचूर)
- Geographical indication
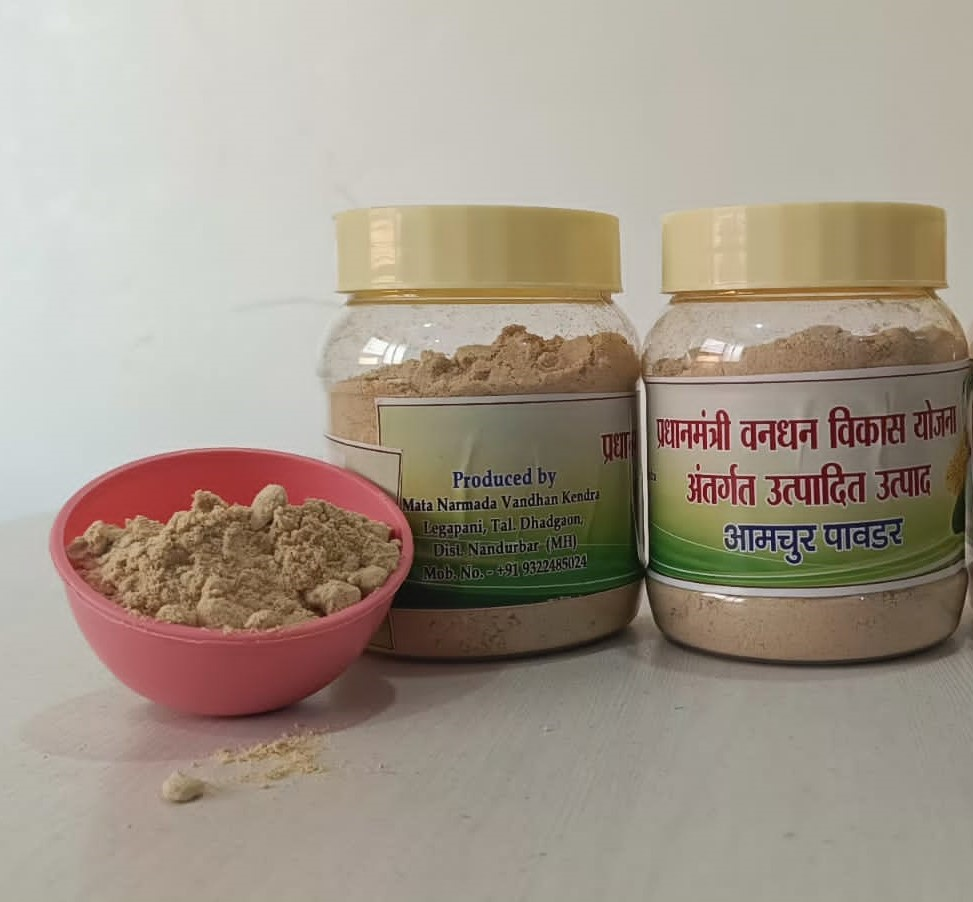
- Description: Nandurbar Amchur is a fruity spice powder variety cultivated in Maharashtra
- Type: Fruity Spice Powder
- Area: Nandurbar district
- Country: India
- Registered: 30 March 2024
- Official website: ipindia.gov.in

Nandurbar Amchur commonly known as mango powder, is a popular Indian fruity spice powder made from dried, unripe local green mangoes (Gaauti Aam) grown in the Nandurbar district of the Indian state of Maharashtra. Nandurbar Amchur is a centuries-old specialty of Nandurbar.

Under its Geographical Indication tag, it is referred to as "Nandurbar Amchur". It is also known as Ambchur, Aamchur powder, Dry Mango powder or Ground Mango.

== Name ==
The term "Nandurbar Amchur" refers to district of Nandurbar while Amchur means dried and powdered unripe mango in the local state language of Marathi.

== Description ==
Nandurbar Amchur, also known as mango powder, is a popular Indian fruity spice made from dried, unripe green mangoes (Gaauti Aam - local variety mango) sourced from the Nandurbar district. The production process involves harvesting local varieties of mangoes while they are green and unripe. The mangoes are then peeled, thinly sliced, and sun-dried. The dried slices are processed into a fine powder, which is sold as ready-made Aamchur.

Nandurbar Amchur has a honey-like fragrance and a sour fruity flavor. It is a tart, pale-beige-to-brownish powder used in various dishes, including stir-fried vegetables, soups, curries, and as a tenderizer for meat and poultry. It adds a fruit flavor without moisture and is used as a souring agent. Nandurbar Amchur is a favored ingredient in North Indian cuisine, particularly in dishes like Chhole, Matar Kulcha, Chicken Tikka, and Aloo-Tikki Chaat. It is also used in spice mixtures, marination, and stuffing. The tangy flavor of Nandurbar Amchur powder is especially beneficial during pregnancy, as it helps combat morning sickness and nausea.

Nandurbar Amchur production is a traditional practice adopted by the tribes of Nandurbar, who have been involved in the process for generations. The contribution of Aamchur production is a significant source of economy in tribal livelihood, holding great social and cultural importance. Nandurbar Amchur is available all year round and should be stored in a well-sealed container to preserve its flavor and aroma.

== Photo and Video Gallery ==
Actual photos as received from Lalsing Vanya Valavi of Aakha Ek Se Farmers Producer Company Limited - the original applicants for the GI Tag registration

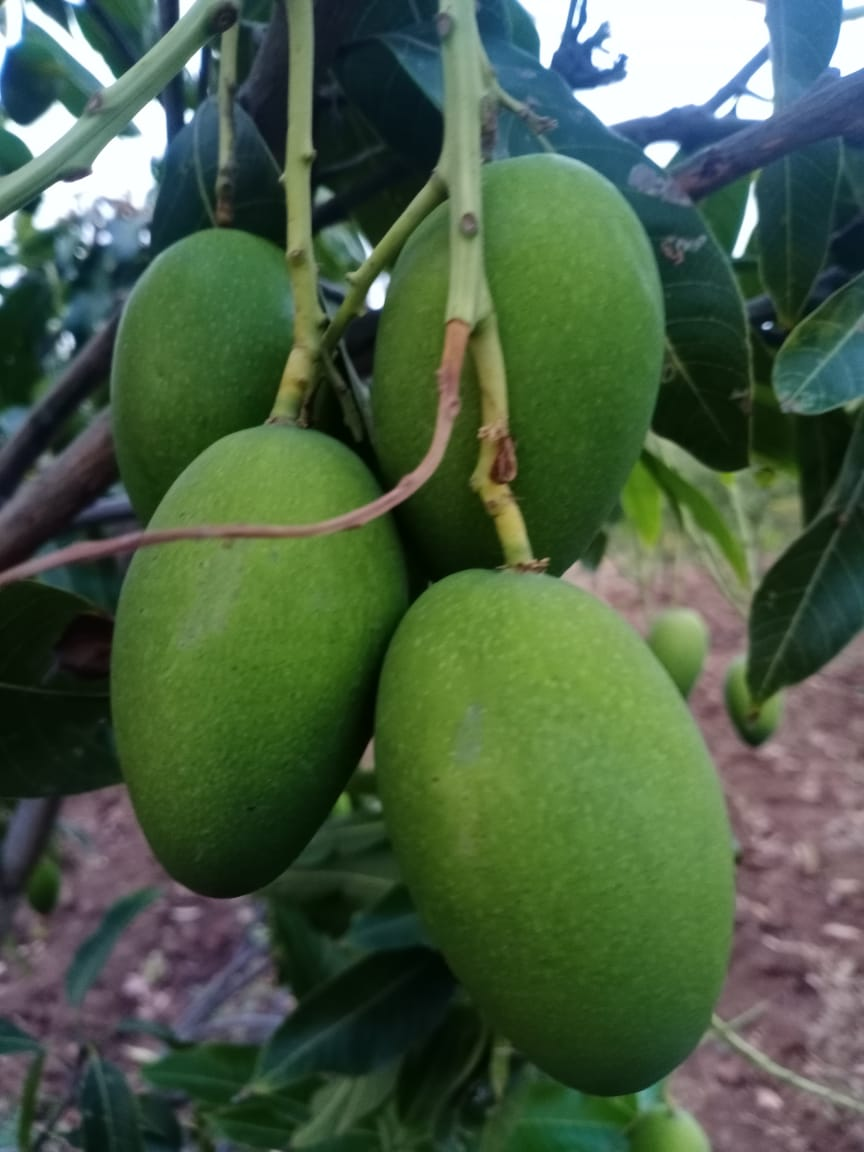
Unripe green mangoes (local wild variety - Gaauti Aam) of Nandurbar district

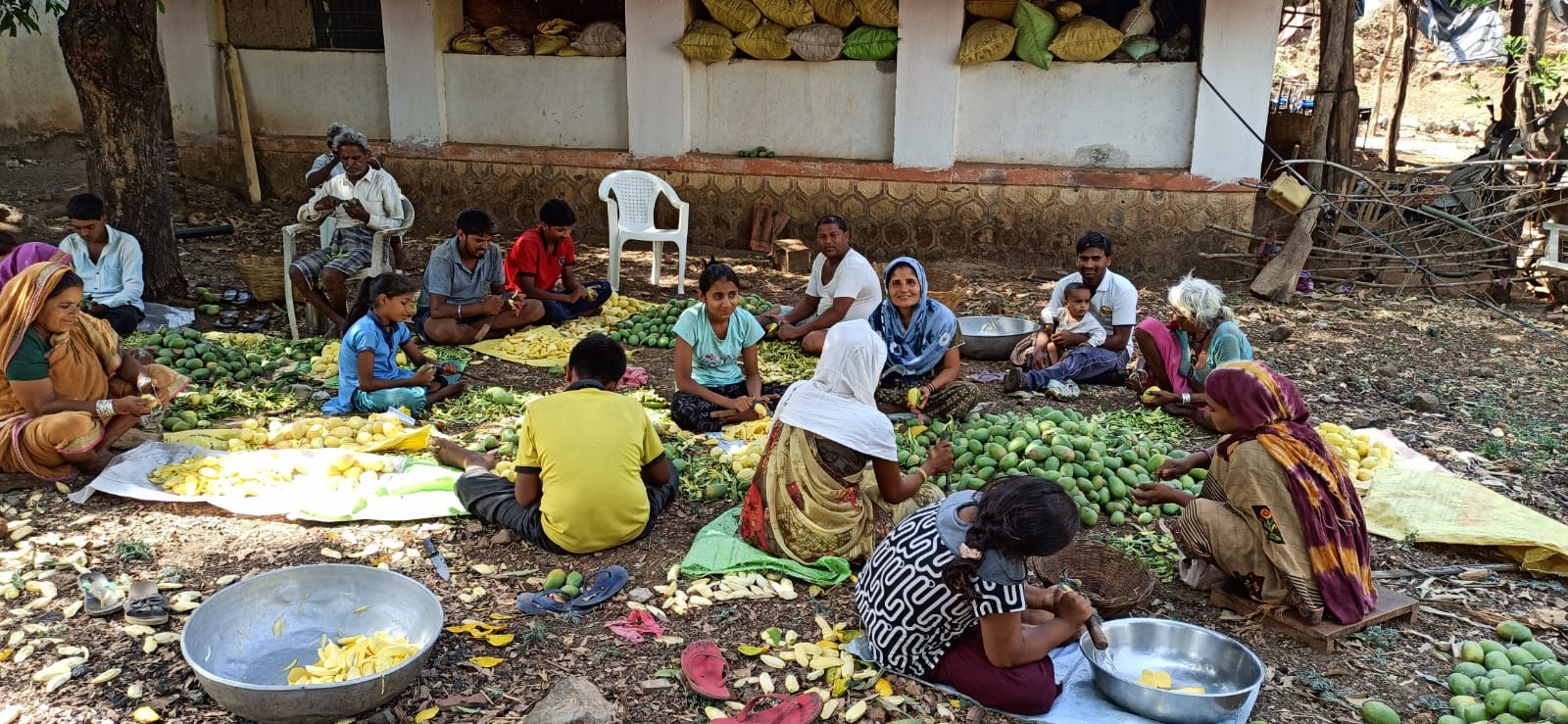
Photo of the local tribal communities of Nandurbar actively participating in the production of Nandurbar Aamchur

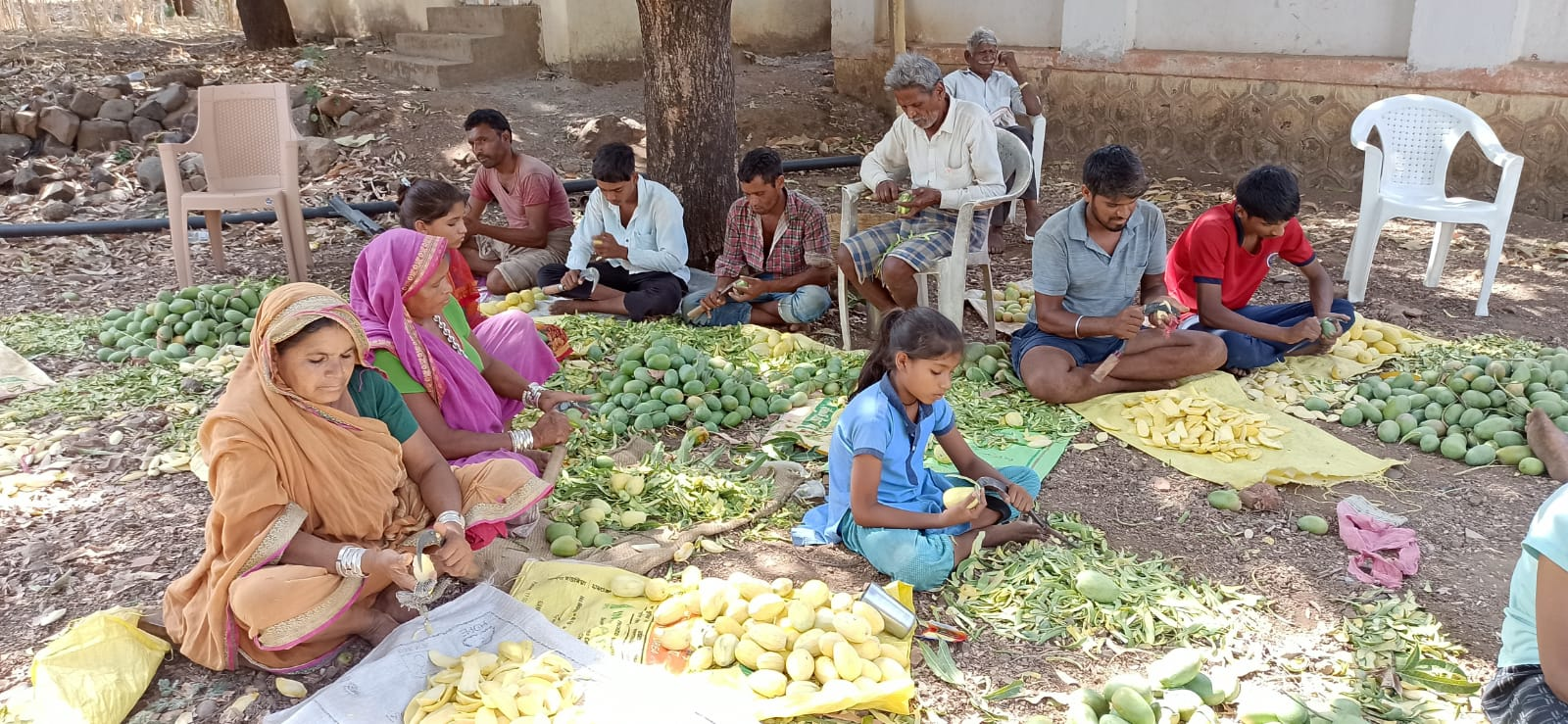
Peeling the mangoes with the help of vegetable peeler

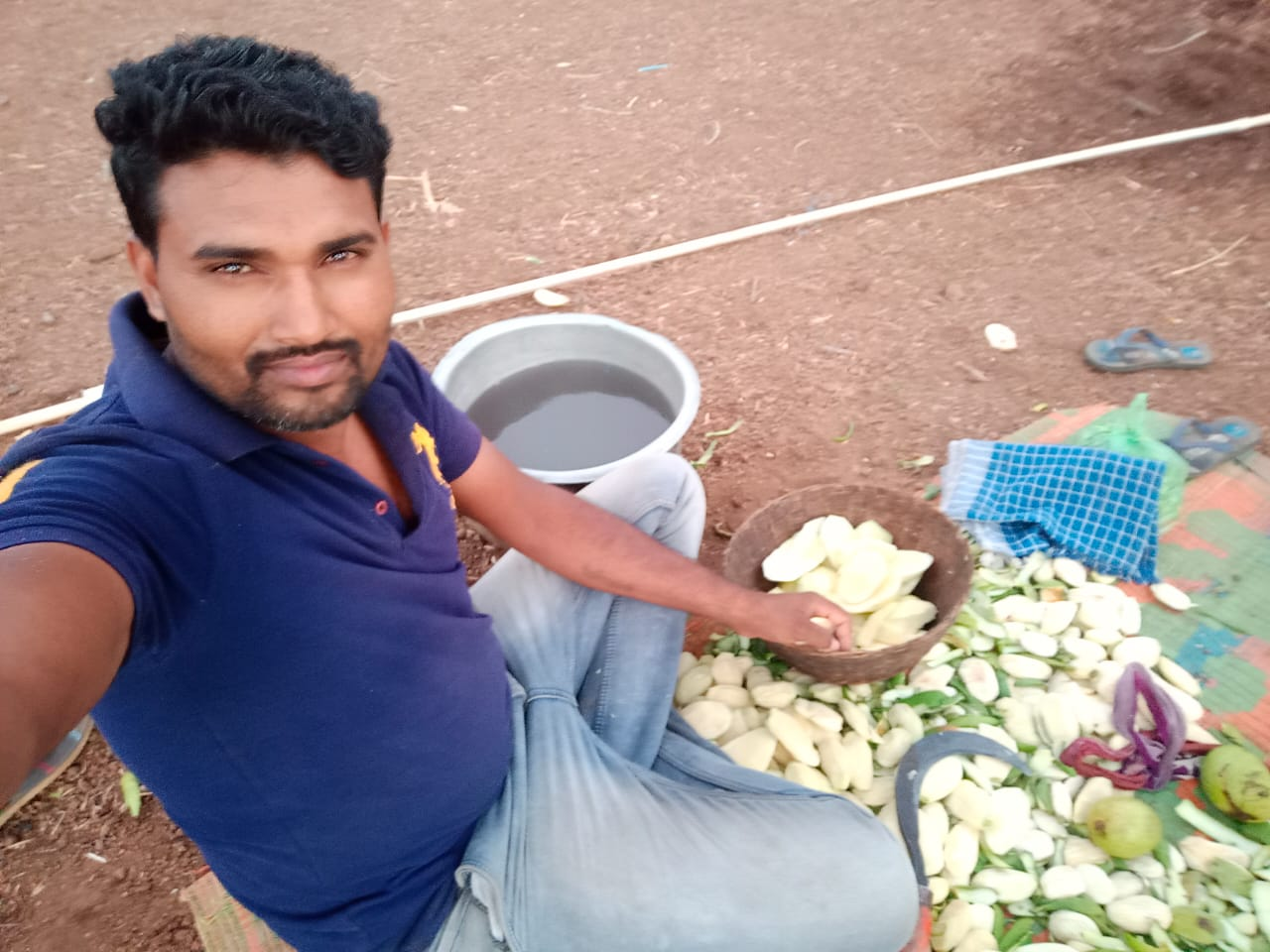
Slicing the peeled mangoes into long thin slices

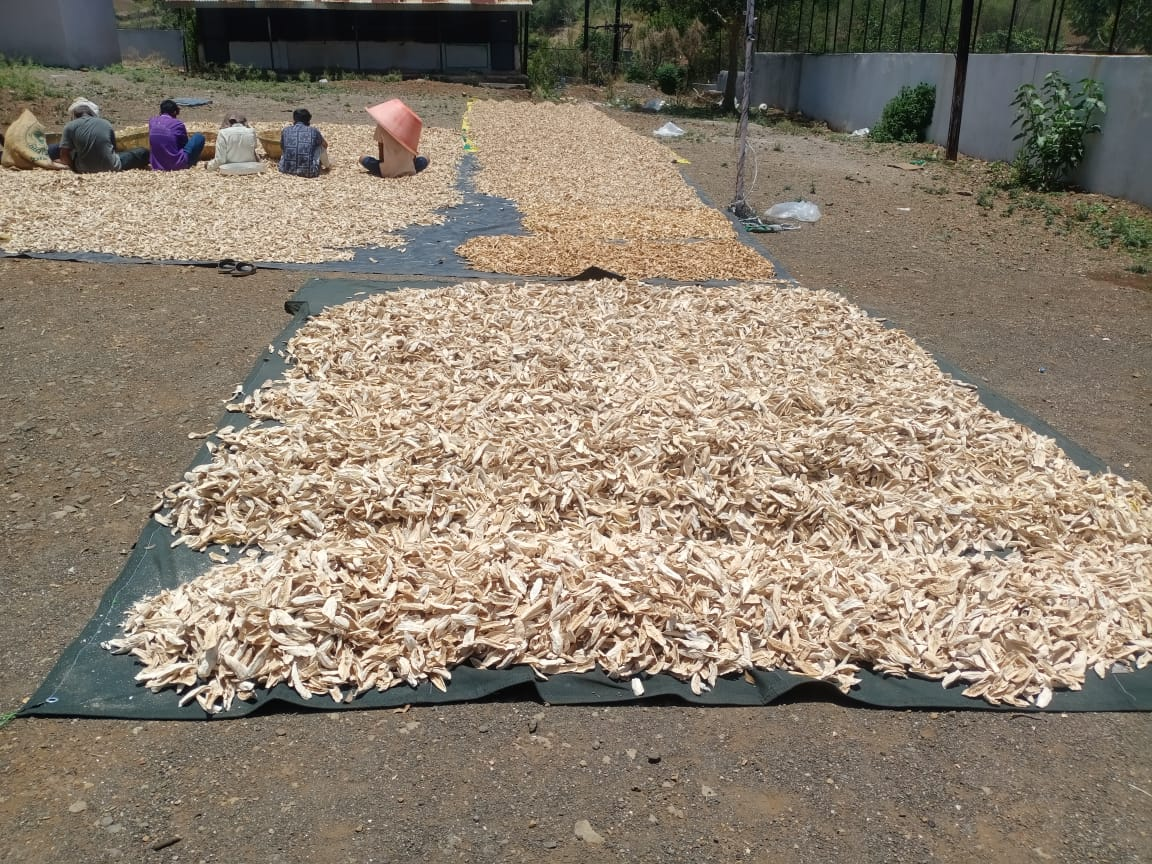
Sun-drying of sliced mangoes on pieces of cloth

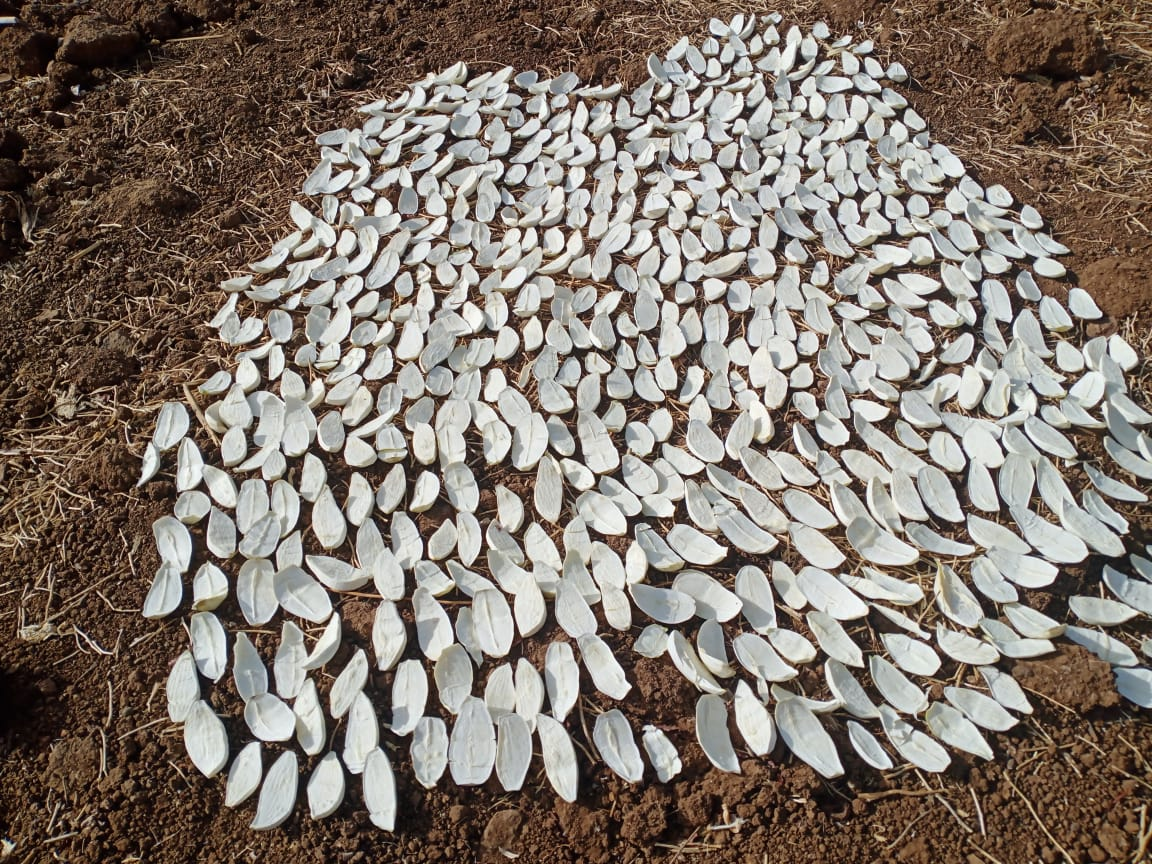
Sun-dried sliced mangoes

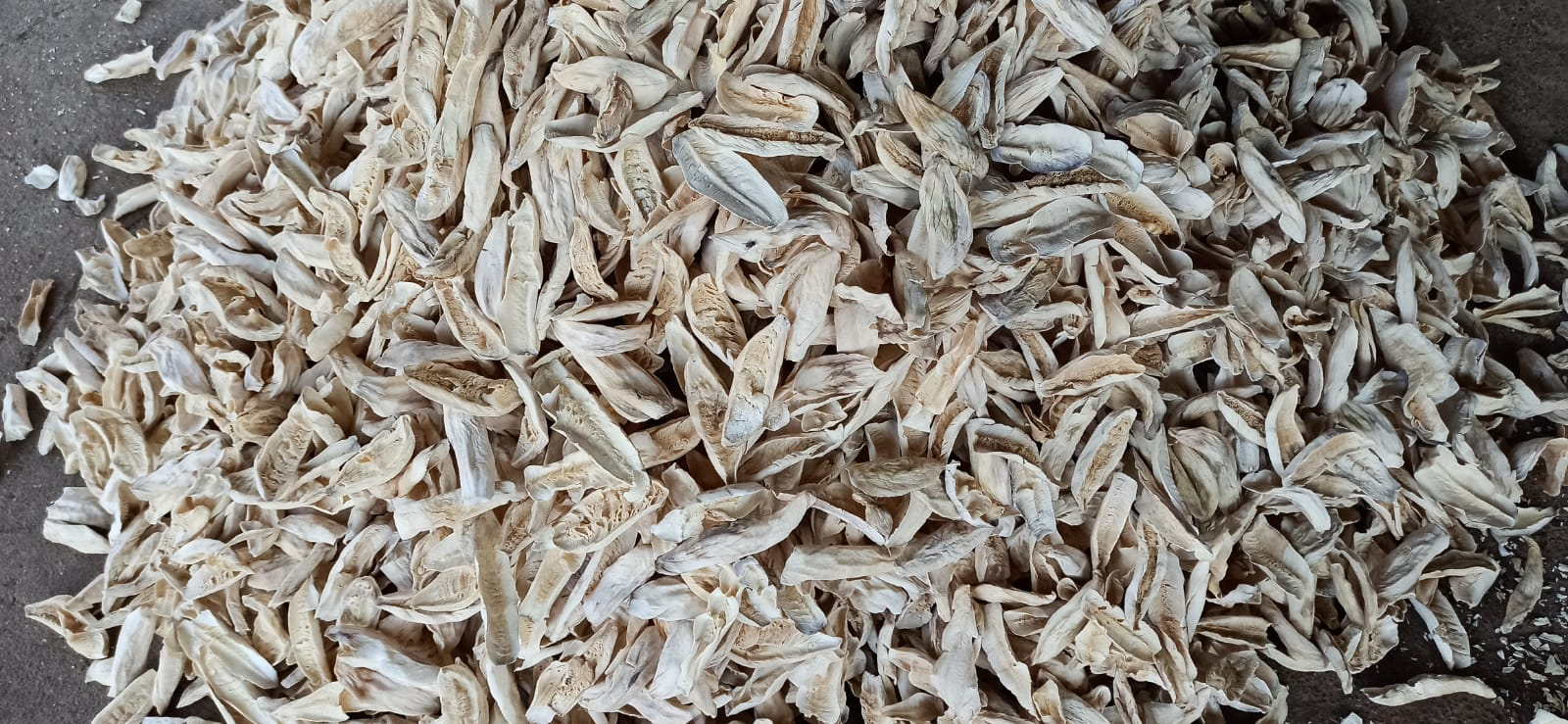
Close-up of Sun-dried sliced mangoes

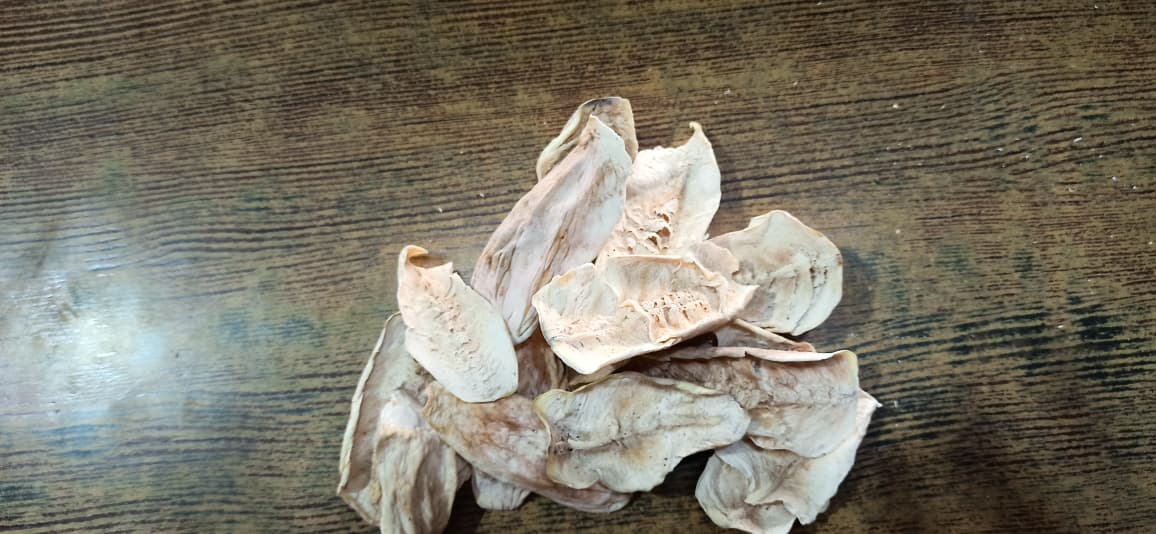
Extreme Close-up of Sun-dried sliced mangoes

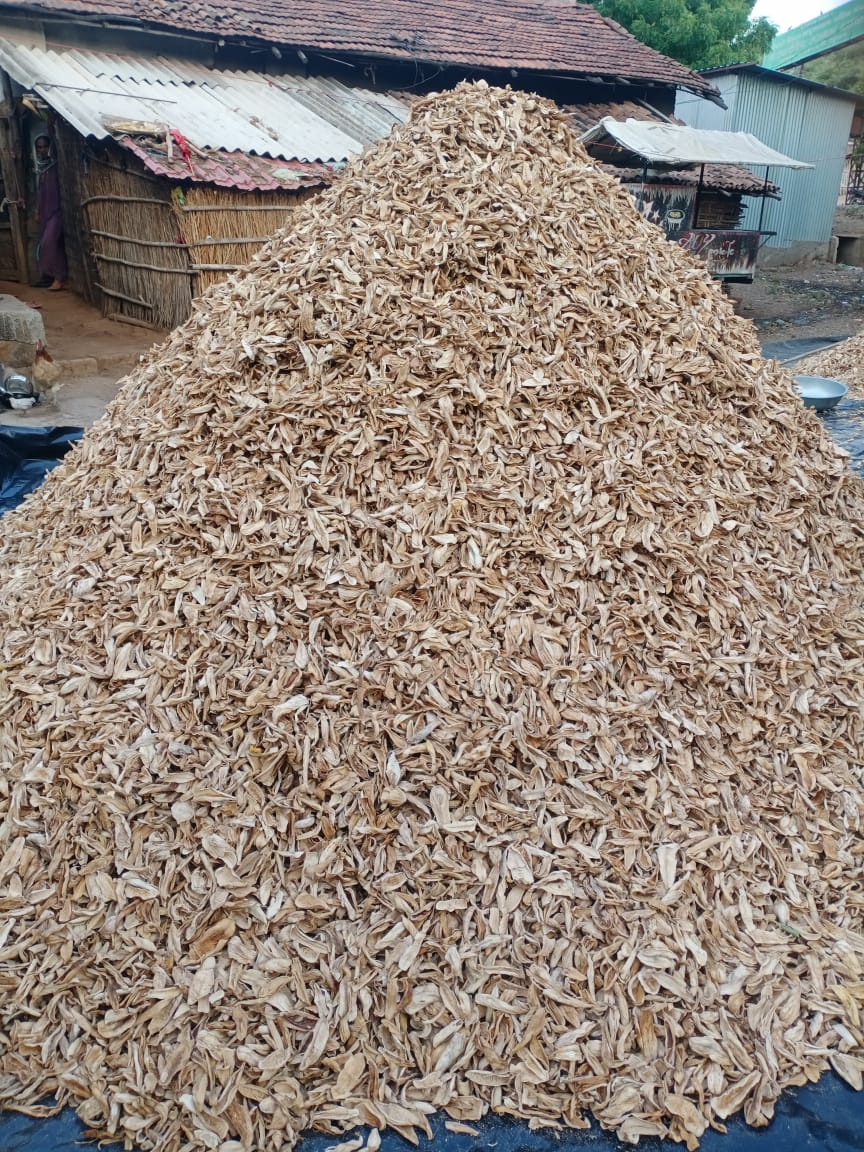
Heap of Sun-dried mango slices

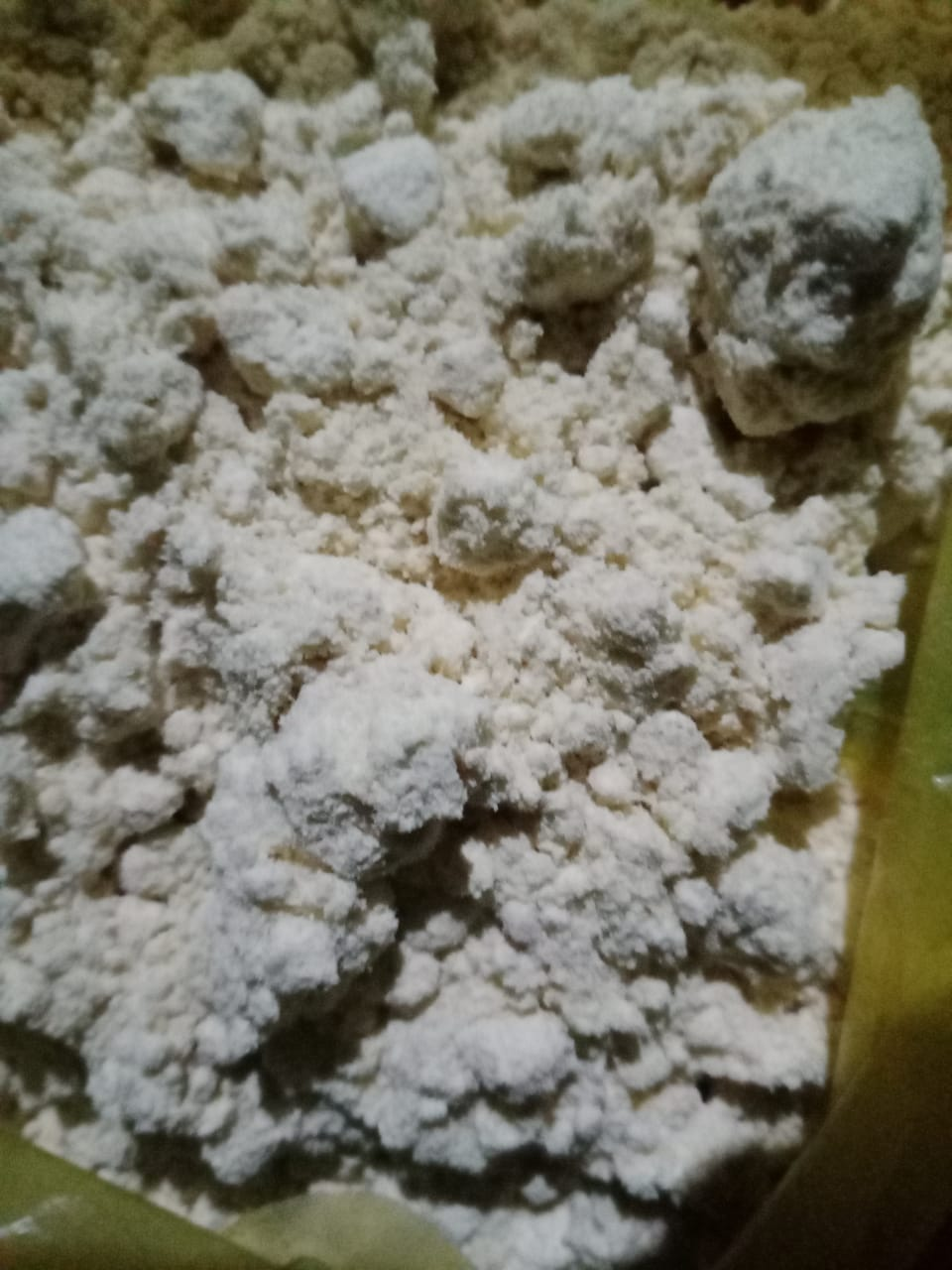
Pounded and then grinded Amchur

Video of Peeling and Slicing of unripe mangoes

Another video of peeling and Slicing of unripe mangoes

Video close-up of Peeling of unipe mangoes

Video close-up of heap of unripe Nandurbar Gaauti Aam Mango dry slices

== Geographical indication ==
It was awarded the Geographical Indication (GI) status tag from the Geographical Indications Registry, under the Union Government of India, on 30 March 2024 and is valid until 19 October 2031.

Amu Aakha Ek Se Farmers Producer Company Limited from Dhadgaon, proposed the GI registration of Nandurbar Amchur. After filing the application in November 2020, the Amchur Powder was granted the GI tag in 2024 by the Geographical Indication Registry in Chennai, making the name "Nandurbar Amchur" exclusive to the region. It thus became the 38th type of goods from Maharashtra to earn the GI tag.

The GI tag protects the Amchur from illegal selling and marketing, and gives it legal protection and a unique identity.

== See also ==
- Nandurbar Mirchi
- Navapur Tur Dal
