= Attappady Thuvara =

Type of Pigeon pea variety from Kerala, India

Attappady Thuvara (അട്ടപ്പാടി തുവര)
- Geographical indication
- Alternative names: Attappady Red Gram, Thomara
- Description: Pigeon pea variety cultivated in Kerala, India
- Type: Pigeon pea
- Area: Kerala
- Country: India
- Registered: 29 July 2022
- Official website: ipindia.gov.in

Attappady Thuvara (red gram) is an important traditional crop variety of pigeon pea cultivated in the Indian state of Kerala. Attappady Thuvara is grown in the Attappady tribal taluk in Palakkad district.

Under its Geographical Indication tag, it is referred to as "'Attappady Thuvara".

== Name ==
Attappady Thuvara is a prized agricultural produce in the Attappady taluka and so named after it. It is known as "Thuvara" in the state language of Malayalam and "Thomara" in the local tribal language.

== Description ==
Attappady Thuvara is a traditional crop of the Attappady tribal area in Palakkad district, Kerala. This crop is cultivated in 700 ha area in Attappady and is characterized by large seeds with high seed size and weight, and high nutritive value.

The Kerala Government has launched the Attappady Millet Village programme to conserve Attappady Thuvara and other traditional crops, securing the livelihood of tribal people. The Attappady area, located within the Nilgiri Biosphere, is home to many endemic crop species and animal breeds, and is primarily inhabited by tribals.

Planting of Attappady Thuvara begins shortly after the summer rains in almost every village, coinciding with the Vishu festival, and due to its widespread cultivation, it becomes readily available in local markets. In 2017, the Agriculture Department cultivated crops in 40 hamlets, benefiting 1,605 tribals, across 485 hectares, which included millets in 225 hectares, pulses in 150 hectares, vegetables in 50 hectares and oilseeds (groundnut) in 60 hectares.

== Geographical indication ==
It was awarded the Geographical Indication (GI) status tag from the Geographical Indications Registry, under the Union Government of India, on 29 July 2022.

Attappady Thuvara Uthppadhaka Sangham from Agali, proposed the GI registration of 'Attappady Thuvara'. After filing the application in March 2020, the Attappady Thuvar was granted the GI tag in 2022 by the Geographical Indication Registry in Chennai, making the name "Attappady Thuvara" exclusive to the Attappady Thuvar cultivated in the region. It thus became the first pigeon pea variety from Kerala and the 40th type of goods from Kerala to earn the GI tag.

The GI tag protects the Attappady Thuvar from illegal selling and marketing, and gives it legal protection and a unique identity.

== See also ==
- Navapur Tur Dal
- Borsuri Tur Dal
- Gulbarga Tur Dal
- Uttarakhand Pahari Toor Dal
- Tandur Redgram
