= Uttarakhand pahari toor dal =

Type of Pigeon pea variety from Uttarakhand, India

Uttarakhand Pahari Toor Dal
- Geographical indication
- Description: Pigeon pea variety cultivated in Uttarakhand, India
- Type: Pigeon pea
- Area: Uttarakhand
- Country: India
- Registered: 8 November 2023
- Official website: ipindia.gov.in

Uttarakhand Pahari Toor Dal is a variety of pigeon pea cultivated in the Indian state of Uttarakhand. Pahari Toor Dal is grown in all 13 districts of Uttarakhand, with the main cultivation areas being Chamoli, Almora, Tehri Garhwal, Nainital, Pithoragarh, and Champawat.

Under its Geographical Indication tag, it is referred to as "'Uttarakhand Pahari Toor Dal".

== Name ==
Uttarakhand Pahari Toor Dal is a prized agricultural produce named after the state of Uttarakhand. The name is derived from the local state language of Hindi, where "Pahari" means mountainous, "Toor" means Pigeon pea, and "Dal" means lentil.

== Description ==
The Pahari Toor Dal, cultivated in Uttarakhand's ideal climate, has distinct properties and characteristics. Its organic nature and unique taste drive high demand, setting it apart from plain area Toor Dal in quality and color. It is an essential legume crop in Uttarakhand's rainfed agriculture. Originating in India, it's widely cultivated in tropical and semi-tropical regions. Authentic, organically grown Toor Dal is cultivated in Uttarakhand's unpolluted environment.

tur is a key component of Barahnaja (Twelve seeds), a traditional practice in Uttarakhand where 12 crops are grown together for sustainable growth. Farmers cultivate tur as a mixed crop, harvesting each crop as it matures. This approach promotes biodiversity and ensures a steady income for farmers. tur can be grown as a single crop or intermixed with cereals.

The Pahari Toor Dal is well-suited to Uttarakhand's agro-ecological conditions, with an extra short duration variety that promotes soil conservation and grain production. It can yield up to 1,800 kg/ha, making it a valuable crop for farmers. tur grows well in areas with low soil fertility, making it an ideal crop for regions with challenging soil conditions. It is also often used as a boundary crop, providing temporary fencing for farmers. In Uttarakhand, over 55% of the area is under rainfed hill agriculture, making tur a vital crop for the region. Toor Dal is successfully grown up to 2,000 meters elevation, demonstrating its adaptability to the region's diverse terrain. Overall, Pahari Toor Dal is a vital crop for Uttarakhand's agriculture, promoting sustainability, biodiversity, and economic growth for farmers.

== Geographical indication ==
It was awarded the Geographical Indication (GI) status tag from the Geographical Indications Registry, under the Union Government of India, on 8 November 2023.

SEWA Koshish Kisaan Utpadak Swayatt Sahkarita from Narendranagar, proposed the GI registration of 'Uttarakhand Pahari Toor Dal. After filing the application in April 2022, the Toor Dal was granted the GI tag in 2023 by the Geographical Indication Registry in Chennai, making the name "Uttarakhand Pahari Toor Dal" exclusive to the Toor Dal cultivated in the region. It thus became the first pigeon pea variety from Uttarakhand and the 20th type of goods from Uttarakhand to earn the GI tag.

The GI tag protects the Toor Dal from illegal selling and marketing, and gives it legal protection and a unique identity.

== See also ==
- Gulbarga Tur Dal
- Navapur Tur Dal
- Borsuri Tur Dal
- Attappady Thuvara
- Tandur Redgram
