= Gulbarga Tur Dal =

Type of Pigeon pea variety from Karnataka, India

Gulbarga Tur Dal (ಕಲಬುರಗಿ ತೊಗರಿ ಬೇಳೆ)
- Geographical indication
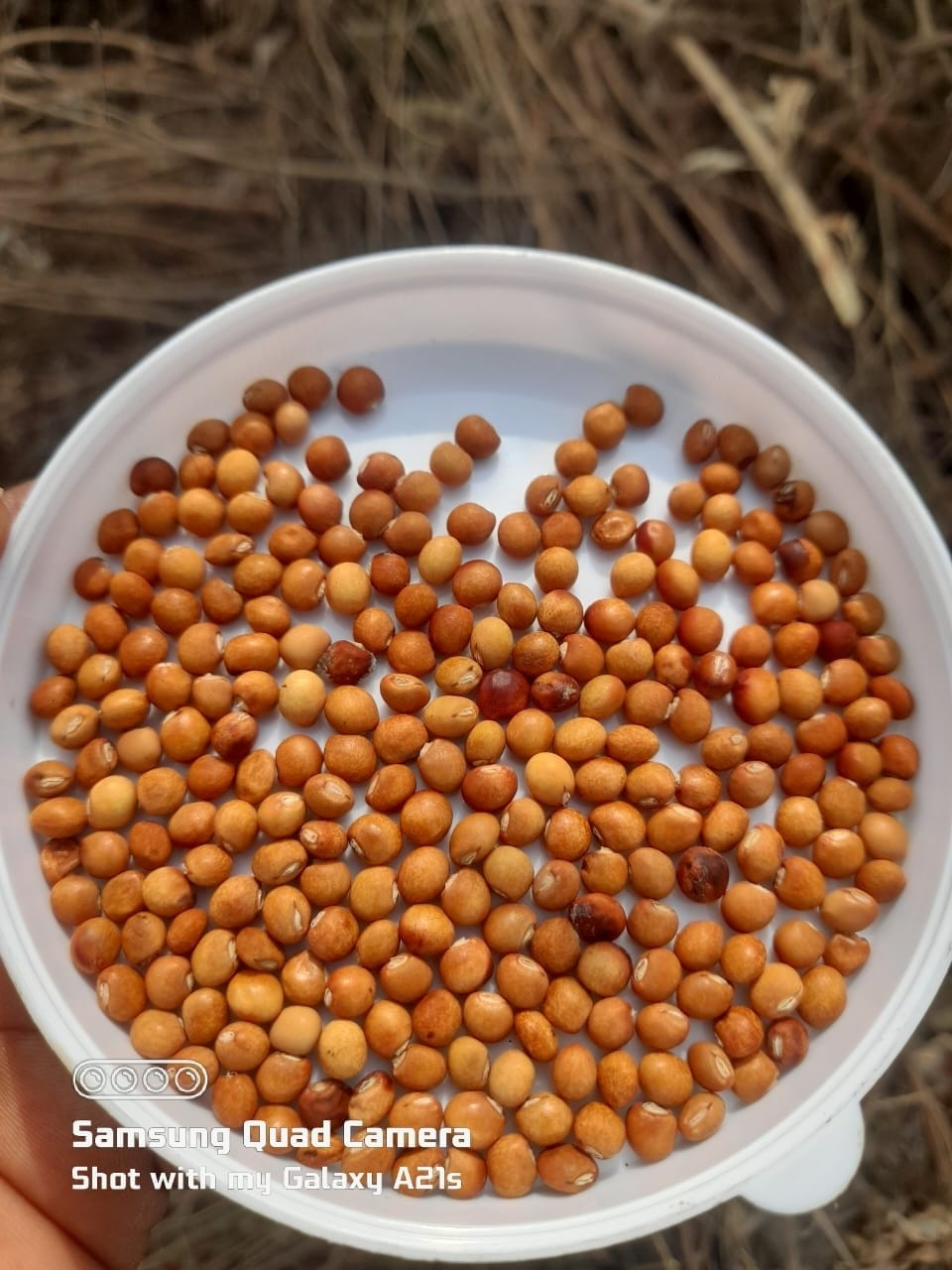
- Gulbarga Tur Dal (Unsplit)
- Alternative names: 'Kalaburagi Togari Bele', 'Gulyal', 'Chaple' or 'Bennur local'
- Description: Pigeon pea variety cultivated in Karnataka, India
- Type: Pigeon pea
- Area: Kalaburagi district
- Country: India
- Registered: 14 August 2019
- Official website: ipindia.gov.in

Gulbarga Tur Dal is a variety of pigeon pea cultivated in the Indian state of Karnataka. It is a common and widely cultivated crop in talukas of Aland, Chincholi, Kalaburagi (Gulbarga), Afzalpur, Chittapur, Sedam and Jewargi located in Kalaburagi district along with Shorapur, Shahpur and Yadgir talukas of Yadgir district. Both districts fall under Kalaburagi division. Kalaburagi district (formerly Gulbarga) accounts for 60% of Karnataka's total tur dal production, with Karnataka being the largest tur dal producer in the country. Kalaburagi district cultivates red gram in 3.7 lakh hectares of land, which accounts for nearly 41% of the total 9 lakh hectares of red gram cultivation in Karnataka.

Under its Geographical Indication tag, it is referred to as "'Gulbarga Tur Dal".

== Name ==
Gulbarga Tur Dal is a prized agricultural produce in Kalaburagi and Yadgir districts falling under Kalaburagi division (formerly known as Gulbarga) and so named after it. It is called "Kalaburagi Togari Bele" in the state language of Kannada with Togari meaning Pigeon pea and Bele meaning lentil. Locally it is known as 'Gulyal', 'Chaple' or 'Bennur local'.

== Description ==
The local Tur Dal from Kalaburagi is unique compared to other varieties cultivated in Karnataka. It has a distinct taste, aroma, shorter cooking period, and higher shelf life quality. This is due to the richness of calcium and potassium in the soils of the region, along with high milling qualities.

The district's climatic conditions are relatively warm and dry, with less annual rainfall. Despite this, the region's highly fertile black cotton soils are suitable for redgram cultivation. Gulbarga district is known as the 'Tur Bowl of Karnataka' due to its prominent tur dal production. The quality Tur Dal from this region is distributed and marketed to other regions and states of India.

Kalaburagi has around 250 dal mills, with capacities to process 10 to 15 tonnes of Tur per day. The physical characteristics of Gulbarga Tur Dal include an orange-yellow color, pleasant aroma during and after cooking, and a fine texture when cooked. The split dal is attractive, with clear edges that are not broken.

== Geographical indication ==
It was awarded the Geographical Indication (GI) status tag from the Geographical Indications Registry, under the Union Government of India, on 14 August 2019 and is valid until 25 September 2027.

University of Agricultural Sciences (UAS) & Karnataka Togari Abhivrudhi Mandali Limited from Kalaburagi, proposed the GI registration of 'Gulbarga Tur Dal. After filing the application in September 2017, the Tur Dal was granted the GI tag in 2019 by the Geographical Indication Registry in Chennai, making the name "Gulbarga Tur Dal" exclusive to the Tur Dal cultivated in the region. It thus became the second Pigeon pea variety from India after Navapur Tur Dal of Maharashtra and the 49th type of goods from Karnataka to earn the GI tag.

The GI tag protects the Tur Dal from illegal selling and marketing, and gives it legal protection and a unique identity.

== See also ==
- Navapur Tur Dal
- Borsuri Tur Dal
- Uttarakhand Pahari Toor Dal
- Attappady Thuvara
- Tandur Redgram
