= Borsuri Tur Dal =

Type of Pigeon pea variety from Maharashtra, India

Borsuri Tur Dal (बोरसुरी तूर डाळ)
- Geographical indication
- Alternative names: Pandhari Tur
- Description: Pigeon pea variety cultivated in Maharashtra, India
- Type: Pigeon pea
- Area: Borsuri village in Latur district
- Country: India
- Registered: 30 March 2024
- Official website: ipindia.gov.in

Borsuri Tur Dal is a variety of pigeon pea cultivated in the Indian state of Maharashtra. It is a common and widely cultivated crop in the Borsuri village of Nilanga taluka located in Latur district.

Under its Geographical Indication tag, it is referred to as "'Borsuri Tur Dal".

== Name ==
Borsuri Tur Dal is a prized agricultural produce in Borsuri village and so named after it. Locally it is known as 'Pandhari Tur'.

== Description ==
Borsuri Tur Dal is a local variety of pigeon pea that is white in color. It is primarily grown in Latur district, where Tur Dal is one of the main crops. The district is traversed by two main rivers, Terna and Manjara, with the Terna river flowing for about 65 km in Nilanga taluka. The medium black soil in these river basins is highly fertile and suitable for Tur cultivation, resulting in high yields. Borsuri is known for its cultivation belt of tur dal, which boasts a distinct nutritional profile and is in high demand, particularly in Delhi and Mumbai.

Borsuri Varan/ Bhokari Varan (Lentil curry or stew) is a spicy and popular Marathwada dish made with a mix of lentils, including Borsuri tur dal, Masoor dal, and green Moong dal, along with spices and other ingredients.

== Geographical indication ==
It was awarded the Geographical Indication (GI) status tag from the Geographical Indications Registry, under the Union Government of India, on 30 March 2024 and is valid until 6 February 2032.

Borsuri Turdal Utpadak Sangh from Borsuri, proposed the GI registration of 'Borsuri Tur Dal'. After filing the application in February 2022, the raisins was granted the GI tag in 2024 by the Geographical Indication Registry in Chennai, making the name "'Borsuri Tur Dal" exclusive to the raisins cultivated in the region. It thus became the second pigeon pea variety from Maharashtra after Navapur Tur Dal and the 45th type of goods from Maharashtra to earn the GI tag.

The GI tag protects the raisins from illegal selling and marketing, and gives it legal protection and a unique identity.

== See also ==
- Navapur Tur Dal
- Gulbarga Tur Dal
- Uttarakhand Pahari Toor Dal
- Attappady Thuvara
- Tandur Redgram
