= Nandurbar Mirchi =

Chilli variety grown in Maharashtra, India

- Species: Capsicum annuum
- Origin: Maharashtra, India

The Nandurbar Mirchi is a variety of chilli grown in the Indian state of Maharashtra. It is mainly cultivated in Nandurbar & Dhule districts of Maharashtra.

Nandurbar district, aptly known as the "Chilli Paradise," is a premier hub for chilli production in India, with a significant number of micro and small-scale units engaged in chilli powder and masala manufacturing.

== Name ==
It is named after its place of origin, the district of Nandurbar, located in the northwest corner of Maharashtra while Mirchi means Chilli - in the local state language of Marathi.

== Geographical indication ==
It was awarded the Geographical Indication (GI) status tag from the Geographical Indications Registry under the Union Government of India on 30 March 2024 (valid until 19 October 2031).

Dr. Headgevar Sewa Samiti from Nandurbar proposed the GI registration of Nandurbar Mirchi. After filing the application on 20/10/2021, the chilli was granted the GI tag in 2024 by the Geographical Indication Registry in Chennai, making the name "Nandurbar Mirchi" exclusive to the chilies grown in the region. It thus became the 2nd chilli variety from Maharashtra after Bhiwapur chilli (which received in 2016) and the 39th type of goods from Maharashtra to earn the GI tag.

== See also ==
- Bhiwapur chilli
- Harmal Chilli
- Khola Chilli
- Navapur Tur Dal
- Nandurbar Amchur
