= Tandur Redgram =

Type of Pigeon pea variety from Telangana, India

Tandur Redgram (తాండూరు కందిపప్పు)
- Geographical indication
- Alternative names: Tandur Kandi Pappu, Togari Pappu, and Tur Dall
- Description: Pigeon pea variety cultivated in Telangana, India
- Type: Pigeon pea
- Area: Tandur taluka
- Country: India
- Registered: 6 December 2022
- Official website: ipindia.gov.in

Tandur Redgram is an important traditional crop variety of pigeon pea cultivated in the Indian state of Telangana. Tandur Redgram is primarily grown in the Tandur taluka situated on the banks of Kagna River in Vikarabad district along with the neighboring districts of Narayanpet, Sangareddy, and Adilabad.

Under its Geographical Indication tag, it is referred to as "'Tandur Redgram".

== Name ==
Tandur Redgram is a prized agricultural produce in the Tandur taluka and so named after it. Tandur Redgram is locally renowned by various names, including Tandur Kandi Pappu, Togari Pappu, and Tur Dall.

== Description ==
Tandur Redgram, a local, significant cash crop and staple food for the local community in the Tandur taluka of Telangana, India. It's a rainfed crop, ideally suited for drought-prone areas, and rich in protein, making it a valuable supplement to traditional cereals.

The crop has cultural significance, with farmers singing traditional folklore songs about Tandur Redgram, passing down the knowledge through generations. Notably, farmers in the region use negligible amounts of chemical herbicides, and the crop thrives in the fertile deep black soils rich in nutrients, especially Potassium and Calcium.

== Geographical indication ==
It was awarded the Geographical Indication (GI) status tag from the Geographical Indications Registry, under the Union Government of India, on 6 December 2022.

Yalal Farmers Producer Company Limited from Vikarabad, proposed the GI registration of 'Tandur Redgram'. After filing the application in September 2020, the pigeon pea was granted the GI tag in 2022 by the Geographical Indication Registry in Chennai, making the name "Tandur Redgram" exclusive to the Pigeon pea cultivated in the region. It thus became the first pigeon pea variety from Telangana and the 17th type of goods from Telangana to earn the GI tag.

The GI tag protects the Tandur Redgram from illegal selling and marketing, and gives it legal protection and a unique identity.

== See also ==
- Navapur Tur Dal
- Borsuri Tur Dal
- Gulbarga Tur Dal
- Uttarakhand Pahari Toor Dal
- Attappady Thuvara
