= Navapur Tur Dal =

Type of Pigeon pea variety from Maharashtra, India

Navapur Tur Dal (Redgram) (नवापूर तूर डाळ)
- Geographical indication
- Alternative names: Desi Tur, Gawran Tur, Pandhari Tur, Diwal Tur, Khokali
- Description: Pigeon pea variety cultivated in Maharashtra, India
- Type: Pigeon pea
- Area: Navapur, Nandurbar district
- Country: India
- Registered: 31 March 2016
- Official website: ipindia.gov.in

Navapur Tur Dal or Redgram is a variety of pigeon pea cultivated in the Indian state of Maharashtra. It is a common and widely cultivated crop in the 160 villages of Navapur taluka located in Nandurbar district. Under its Geographical Indication tag, it is referred to as "'Navapur Tur Dal".

== Name ==
Navapur Tur Dal is a prized agricultural produce in Navapur and so named after it. Locally it is known as 'Desi Tur', 'Gawran Tur / Pandhari Tur', 'Diwal Tur', 'Khokali'.

== Description ==
The 'Navapur Tur Dal/Redgram' is a variety cultivated in the Navapur region for a long time. The area's black cotton soil and hilly surroundings create a favorable environment for its growth. This variety is a staple in the local diet, particularly among the tribal communities.

The 'Navapur Tur Dal/Redgram' is white in color, also known as 'white tur'. It has a small grain size compared to other varieties of red gram found in Maharashtra. The cooking period of this local variety is less compared to other varieties. The 'Navapur Tur Dal/Redgram' is locally known by various names, including 'Desi Tur', 'Gawran Tur/Pandhari Tur' due to its traditional golden-white color, 'Diwali Tur' as it becomes available in the market around Diwali, and 'Khokali', which indicates the crop's maturity when the pods rustle in the wind.

This variety not only takes a lesser amount of time for cultivation, around 90 to 120 days, but the plant height is also a bit shorter than the other varieties of pigeon pea/red gram in Maharashtra. 'Navapur Tur Dal /Redgram' is a white seeded variety and white seeded varieties of pigeon pea/red gram contain relatively less amount of antinutritional factors such as polyphenols, phytolectins compared to red seeded varieties.

== Geographical indication ==
It was awarded the Geographical Indication (GI) status tag from the Geographical Indications Registry, under the Union Government of India, on 31 March 2016 and is valid until 25 March 2034.

Baliraja Krushak Bachat Gat from Navapur, proposed the GI registration of 'Navapur Tur Dal'. After filing the application in March 2014, the Tur Dal was granted the GI tag in 2016 by the Geographical Indication Registry in Chennai, making the name "'Navapur Tur Dal" exclusive to the Tur Dal cultivated in the region. It thus became the first pigeon pea variety from India and the 15th type of goods from Maharashtra to earn the GI tag.

The GI tag protects the Tur Dal from illegal selling and marketing, and gives it legal protection and a unique identity.

== See also ==
- Nandurbar Mirchi
- Nandurbar Amchur
- Borsuri Tur Dal
- Gulbarga Tur Dal
- Uttarakhand Pahari Toor Dal
- Attappady Thuvara
- Tandur Redgram
