= Bhiwapur chilli =

Chilli variety grown in Maharashtra, India

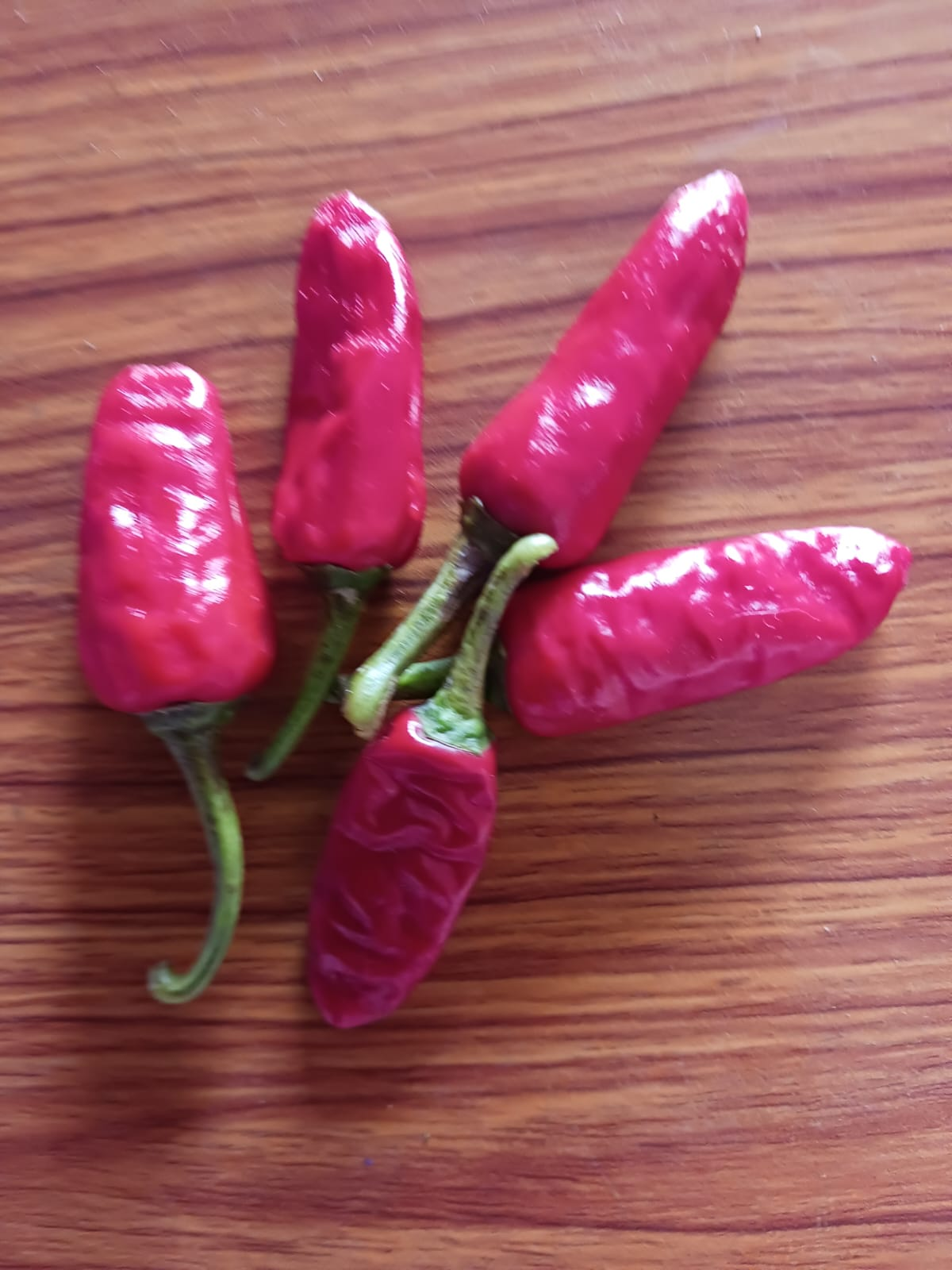
- Bhiwapur Chilli in red ripened stage
- Species: Capsicum annuum
- Origin: Maharashtra, India
- Scoville scale: 20,000 SHU

The Bhiwapur chilli is a variety of chilli mainly grown in Nagpur district, of the Indian state of Maharashtra.

== Name ==
It is named after its place of origin, the town of Bhiwapur, located in Umred taluka, Nagpur. It is also known as Doda chilli in the local language.

== Description ==
These chillies are known for their bright red colour that is used as a dye in food and cosmetics. It measures 1.5 inches in length. The outer covering is thick, thus reducing breakage and extending shelf life. The red colored Bhiwapur chilli, which is darker than other chillies like Guntur chillies, is used in various recipes, including chutneys, curries, and pickles. It is a primary ingredient in 'Varhadi Thecha', a spicy red chilli chutney. The chilli is known for its heat and is used in traditional Maharashtrian cuisine.

== Photo Gallery ==
Actual photos from Bhiwapur Mirchi Utpadak Samutha Gat (Bhiwapur Chilli Growers Association) - the original applicants for the GI Tag registration

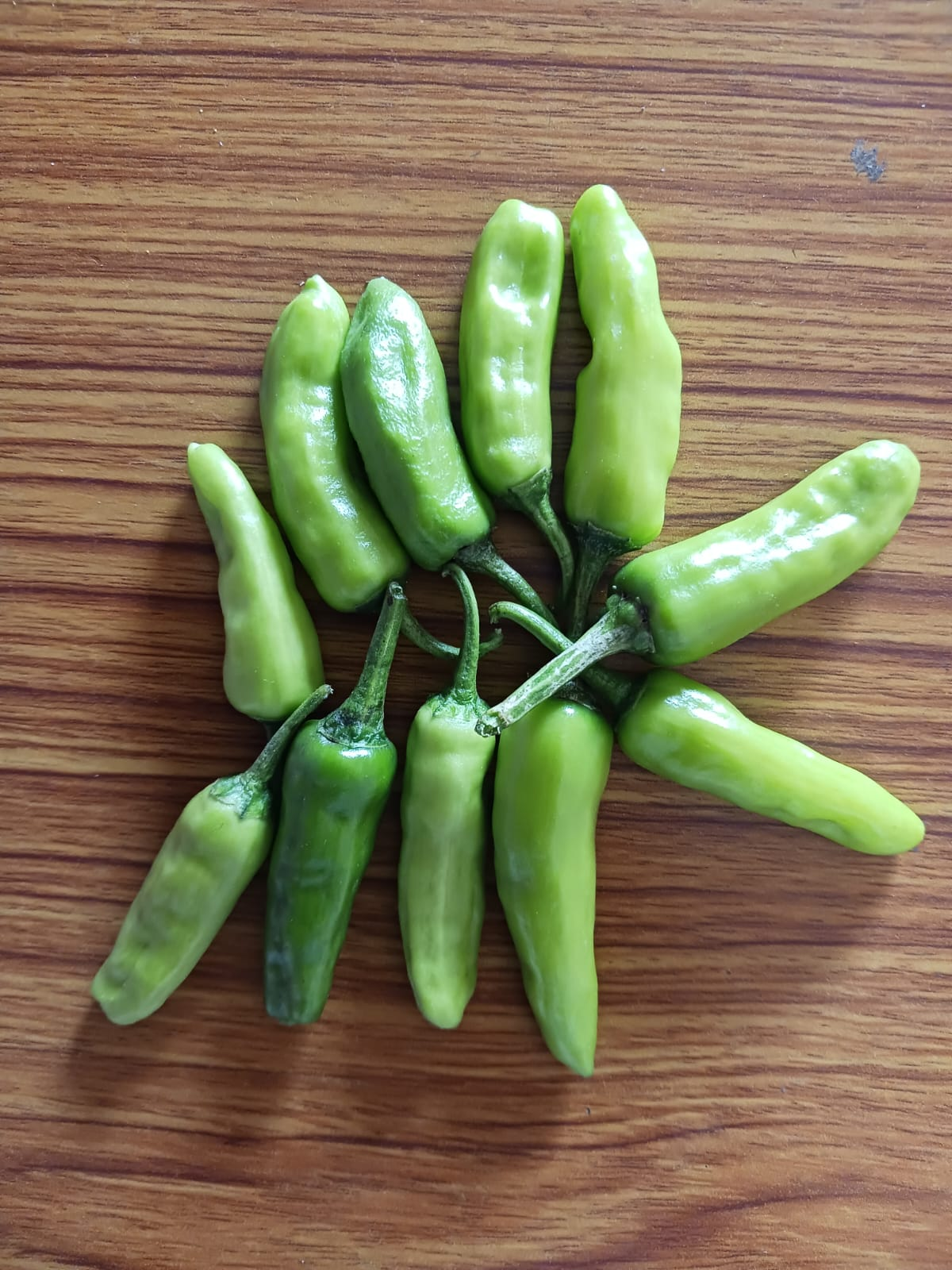
Bhiwapur Chilli in green unripened stage

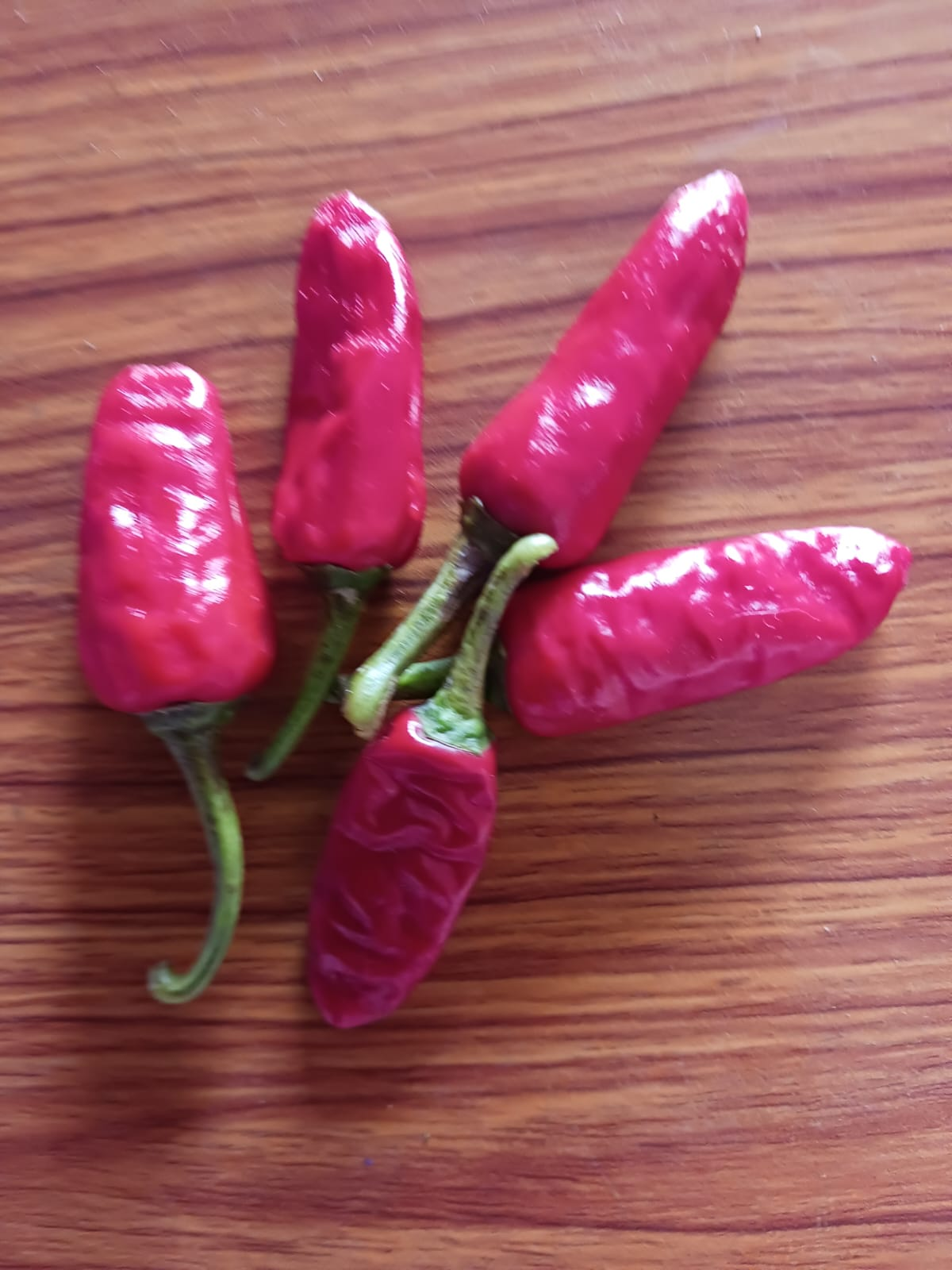
Bhiwapur Chilli in red ripened stage

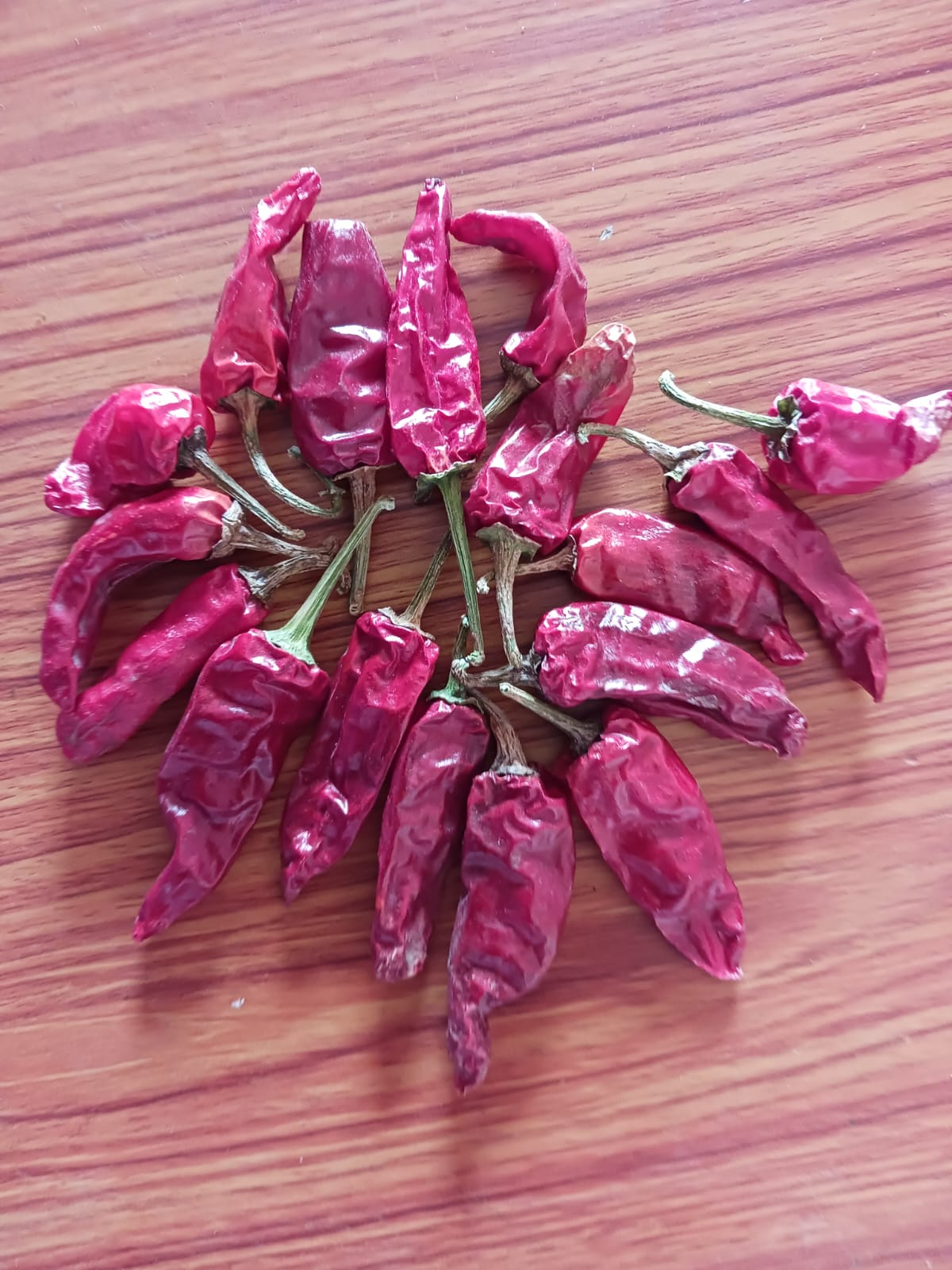
Bhiwapur Chilli in red dried stage

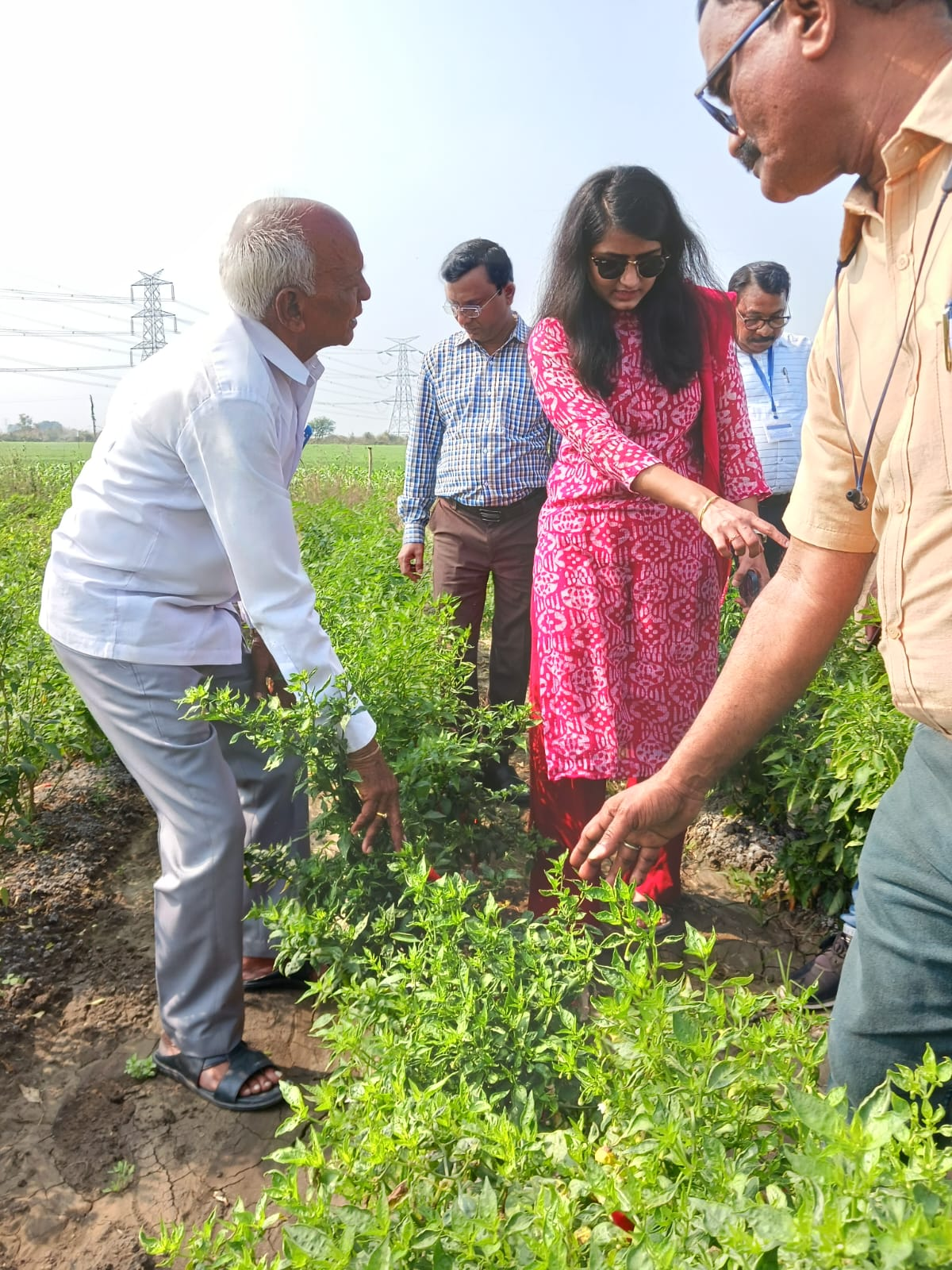
Dr. Naryan Lambat (in white) explaining during a chilli farm tour

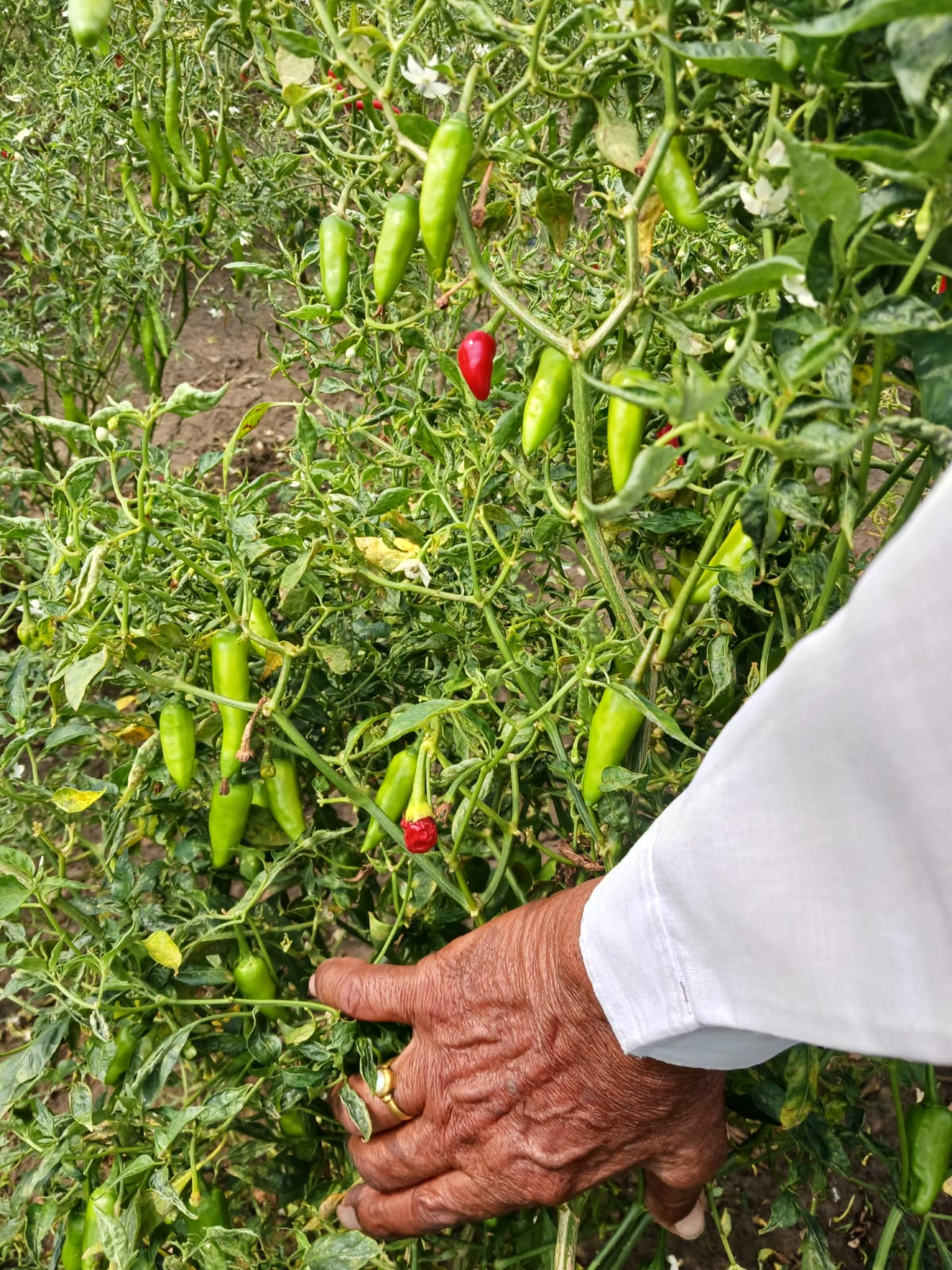
Photo of ripe and unripe Bhiwapur chillies in a farm

== Geographical indication ==
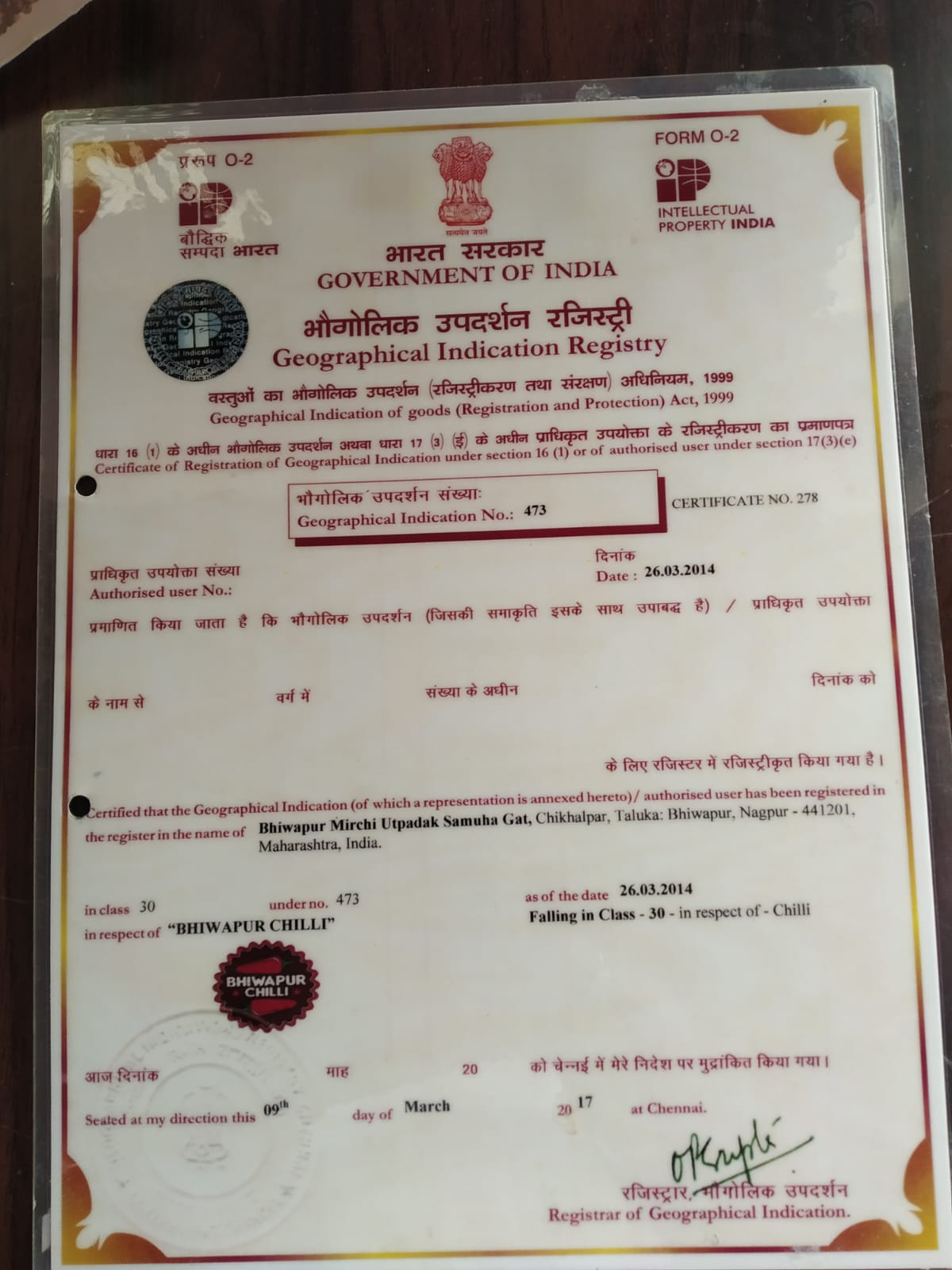
GI Tag Certificate for Bhiwapur chilli

It was awarded the Geographical Indication (GI) status tag from the Geographical Indications Registry under the Union Government of India on 9 March 2017 (valid until 25 March 2034).

Bhiwapur Mirchi Utpadak Samutha Gat from Bhiwapur, proposed the GI registration of Bhiwapur chilli. After filing the application in March 2014, the chilli was granted the GI tag in 2017 by the Geographical Indication Registry in Chennai, making the name "Bhiwapur chilli" exclusive to the chilies grown in the region. It thus became the first chilli variety from Maharashtra and the 25th type of goods from Maharashtra to earn the GI tag.

== See also ==
- Khola chilli
- Harmal chilli
- Banaras Lal Bharwamirch (Red Pickle Chilli)
