= Betel nut chewing =

Preparation of betel leaf and areca nut

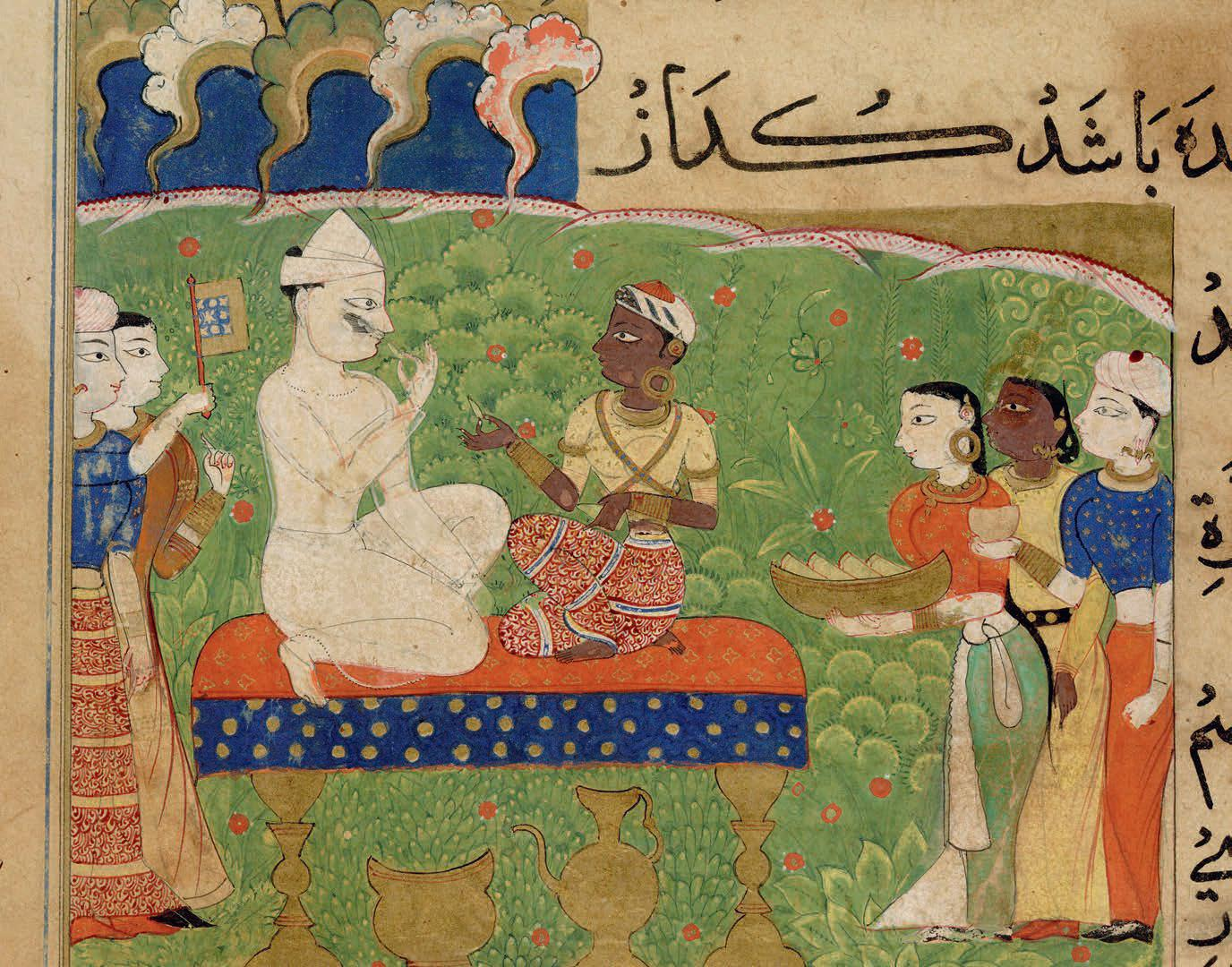
Ghiyas al-Din eats a betel chew, illustration from the Nimatnama-i-Nasiruddin-Shahi. Malwa, c. 1500. British Library

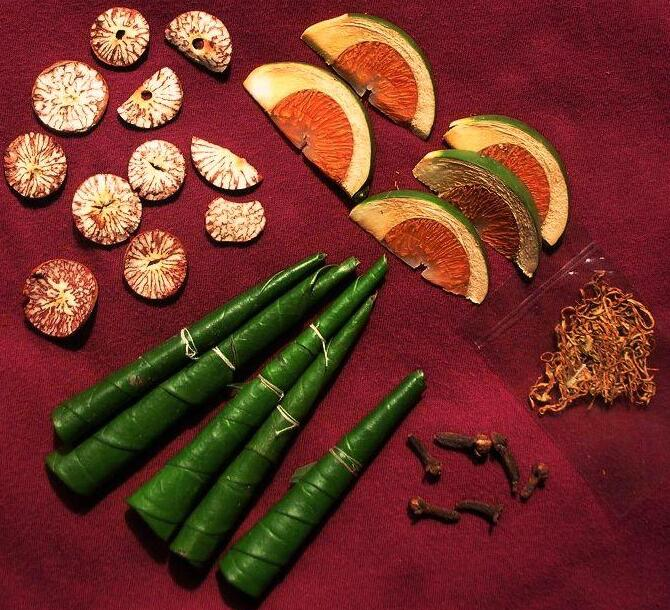
The items used in a chewing session. The betel leaves are folded. Slices of the dry areca nut are on the upper left. Slices of the tender areca nut are on the upper right. The pouch on the right has tobacco, an optional element. On the lower right, there are dried cloves.

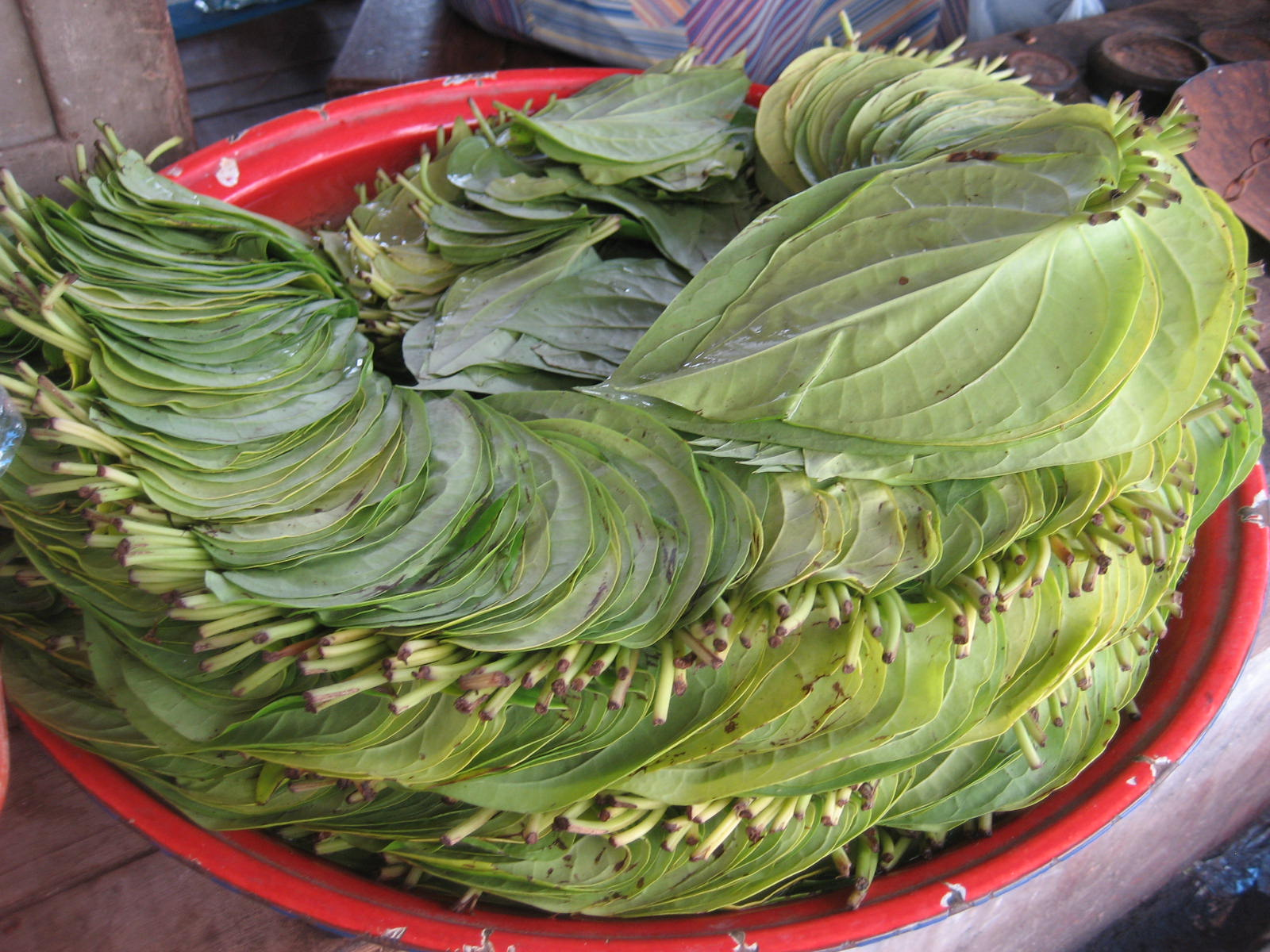
Betel leaves at a market in Mandalay, Myanmar

Betel nut chewing, also called betel quid chewing or areca nut chewing, is a practice in which areca nuts (also called "betel nuts") are chewed together with slaked lime and betel leaves for their stimulant and narcotic effects, the primary psychoactive compound being arecoline. The practice is widespread in Southeast Asia, Micronesia, Island Melanesia, and South Asia. It is also found among both Han Chinese immigrants and indigenous peoples of Taiwan, Madagascar, and parts of southern China. It was introduced to the Caribbean in colonial times.

The preparation combining the areca nut, slaked lime, and betel (Piper betle) leaves is known as a betel quid (also called paan or pan in South Asia), but the exact composition of the mixture varies geographically. It can sometimes include other substances for flavoring and to freshen the breath, like coconut, dates, sugar, menthol, saffron, cloves, aniseed, cardamom, and many others. The areca nut can be replaced with tobacco or the two chewed together, and the betel leaves can be excluded. In West Papua, the leaf may be replaced with stem and inflorescence of the Piper betle plant. The preparation is not swallowed but is spat out after chewing. Chewing results in permanent red stains on the teeth after prolonged use. The spit from chewing betel nuts, which also results in red stains, is often regarded as unhygienic and an eyesore in public facilities in certain countries.

Betel nut chewing is addictive and causes adverse health effects, mainly oral and esophageal cancers, and cardiovascular disease. When chewed with additional tobacco in its preparation (like in gutka), there is an even higher risk, especially for oral and oropharyngeal cancers. With tobacco it also raises the risk of fatal coronary artery disease, fatal stroke, and adverse reproductive effects including stillbirth, premature birth and low birth weight.

The practice of betel nut chewing originated in Southeast Asia, where the plant ingredients are native. The earliest evidence for use of the areca nut is older than any evidence for the quid: two pre-agricultural foragers from the Indonesian island of Sulawesi, one dated to between 25,000 and 16,000 BP and the other to between 7,600 and 6,300 BP, show tooth wear and traces of arecoline in their teeth attributable to the habitual sucking of whole nuts, without lime or leaf. The oldest evidence of betel nut chewing with lime is found in a burial pit in the Duyong Cave site of the Philippines, an area where areca palms were native, dated to around 4,630±250 BP. Its diffusion is closely tied to the Neolithic expansion of the Austronesian peoples. It was spread to the Indo-Pacific during prehistoric times, reaching Micronesia at 3,500 to 3,000 BP, Near Oceania at 3,400 to 3,000 BP; South India and Sri Lanka by 3,500 BP; Mainland Southeast Asia by 3,000 to 2,500 BP; Northern India by 1500 BP; and Madagascar by 600 BP. From India it spread westward to Persia and the Mediterranean. It was present in the Lapita culture, based on archaeological remains dated from 3,600 to 2,500 BP, but it was not carried into Polynesia.

== Culture ==
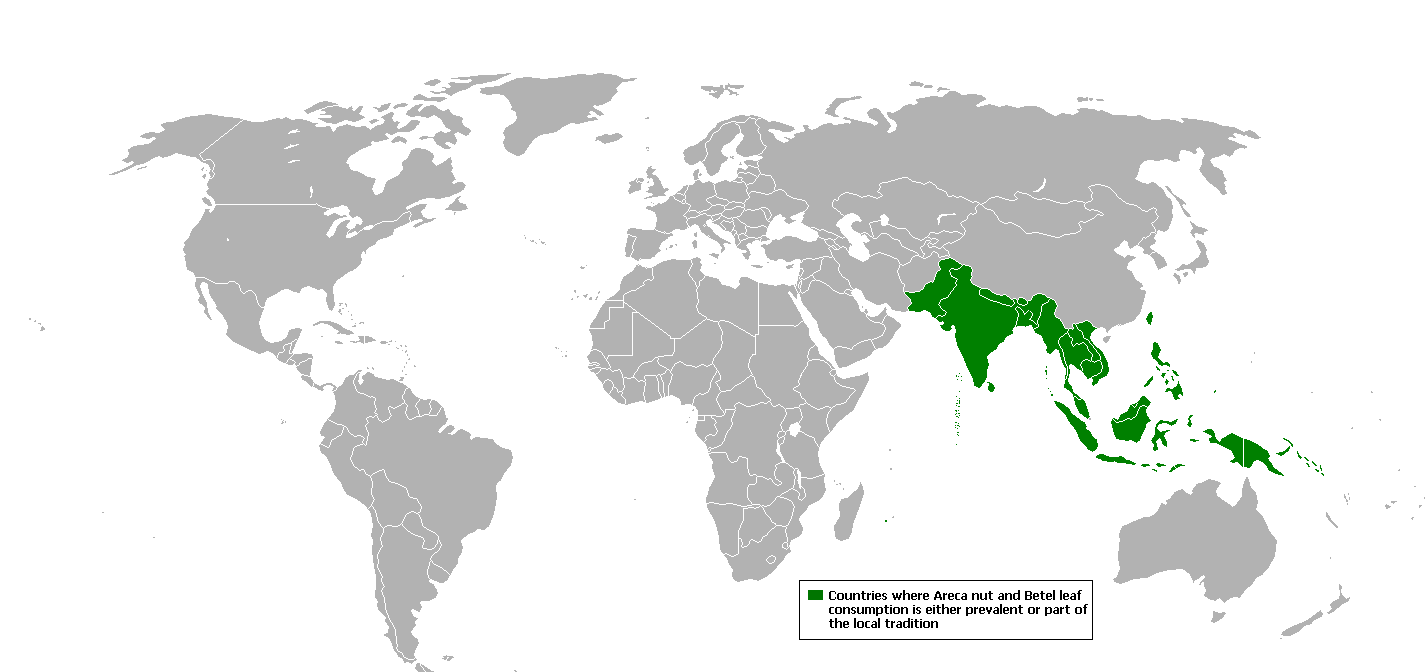
A map of global betel leaf and areca nut consumption

One of the earliest firsthand accounts of betel nut chewing by western authors was from Ibn Battuta. He describes this practice as follows:

The betel is a tree which is cultivated in the same manner as the grape-vine; ... The betel has no fruit and is grown only for the sake of its leaves ... The manner of its use is that before eating it one takes areca nut; this is like a nutmeg but is broken up until it is reduced to small pellets, and one places these in his mouth and chews them. Then he takes the leaves of betel, puts a little chalk on them, and masticates them along with the betel.

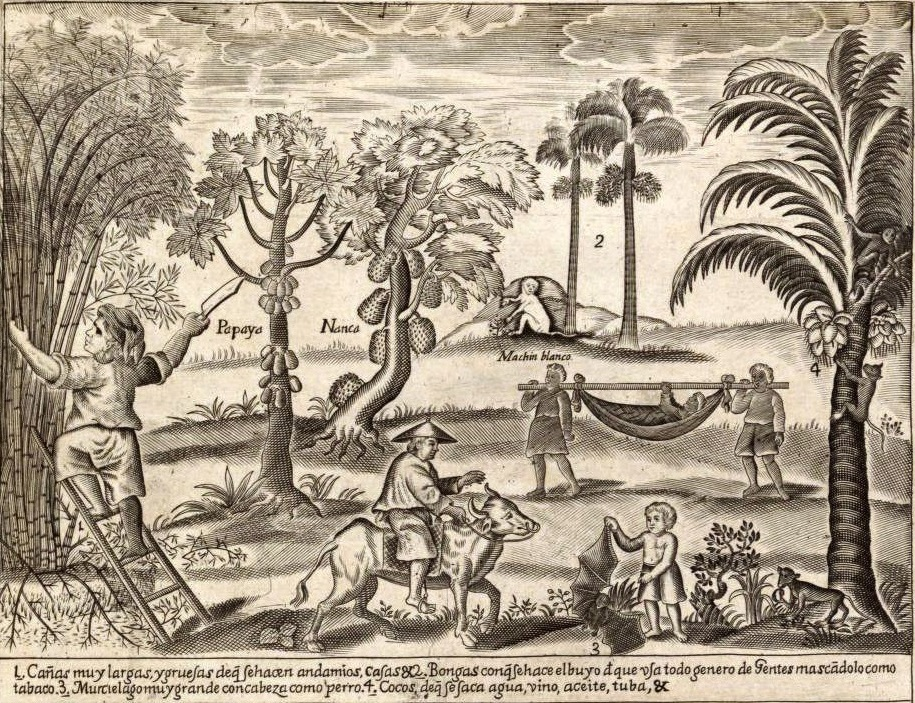
Detail from the Murillo Velarde map (c. 1734) of the Philippines, showing an areca palm with fruits, captioned Bongas con que se hace el buyo de que usa todo genero de gentes mascádolo como tabaco ("Fruits from which one makes buyo, which is used by every sort of people, who chew it like tobacco")

An early European description of betel chewing is from the Magellan Expedition to the Philippines in 1521. Antonio Pigafetta describes the practice of betel nut chewing among the natives of the Rajahnate of Butuan.

Those people are constantly chewing a fruit which they call "areca", and which resembles a pear. They cut that fruit into four parts, and then wrap it in the leaves of their tree [sic] which they call "betre". Those leaves resemble the leaves of the mulberry. They mix it with a little lime, and when they have chewed it thoroughly, they spit it out. It makes the mouth exceedingly red. All the people in those parts of the world use it, for it is very cooling to the heart, and if they ceased to use it they would die.

— Antonio Pigafetta, Relazione del primo viaggio intorno al mondo (1521)

Betel quid chewing constitutes an important and popular cultural activity in many Asian and Oceanic countries, including India, Bangladesh, Myanmar, Cambodia, the Solomon Islands, Thailand, the Philippines, Laos, and Vietnam. Chewing betel was once common in Malaysia, but the practice has long since died out. Betel nut kits (tepak sirih) made of silver and other precious metals, once featured in royal regalia and presented as wedding gifts, have become collector's items, and a tepak sirih set is featured on the 1989–2012 series Malaysian 20-sen coin.

In urban areas, chewing betel quid is generally considered a nuisance because some chewers spit the betel quid juice out in public areas. The combination of ingredients when chewed is known to make a colourful stain. This is becoming an unwanted eyesore in Indian cities such as Mumbai, although many see it as an integral part of Indian culture. This is also common in some of the Persian Gulf countries, such as the UAE and Qatar, where many Indians live. In 2008 the Dubai government banned the import and sale of betel quid and the like.

According to traditional Ayurvedic medicine, chewing betel leaf is a remedy against bad breath (halitosis).

=== Cambodia, Laos and Thailand ===
The chewing of the product is part of the culture of Cambodia, Laos, and Thailand. Cultivation of areca nut palm and betel leaves is common in rural areas of these countries, being a traditional cash crop, and the utensils used for preparation are often treasured. Now, many young people have given up the habit, especially in urban areas, but many, especially older people, still keep to the tradition.

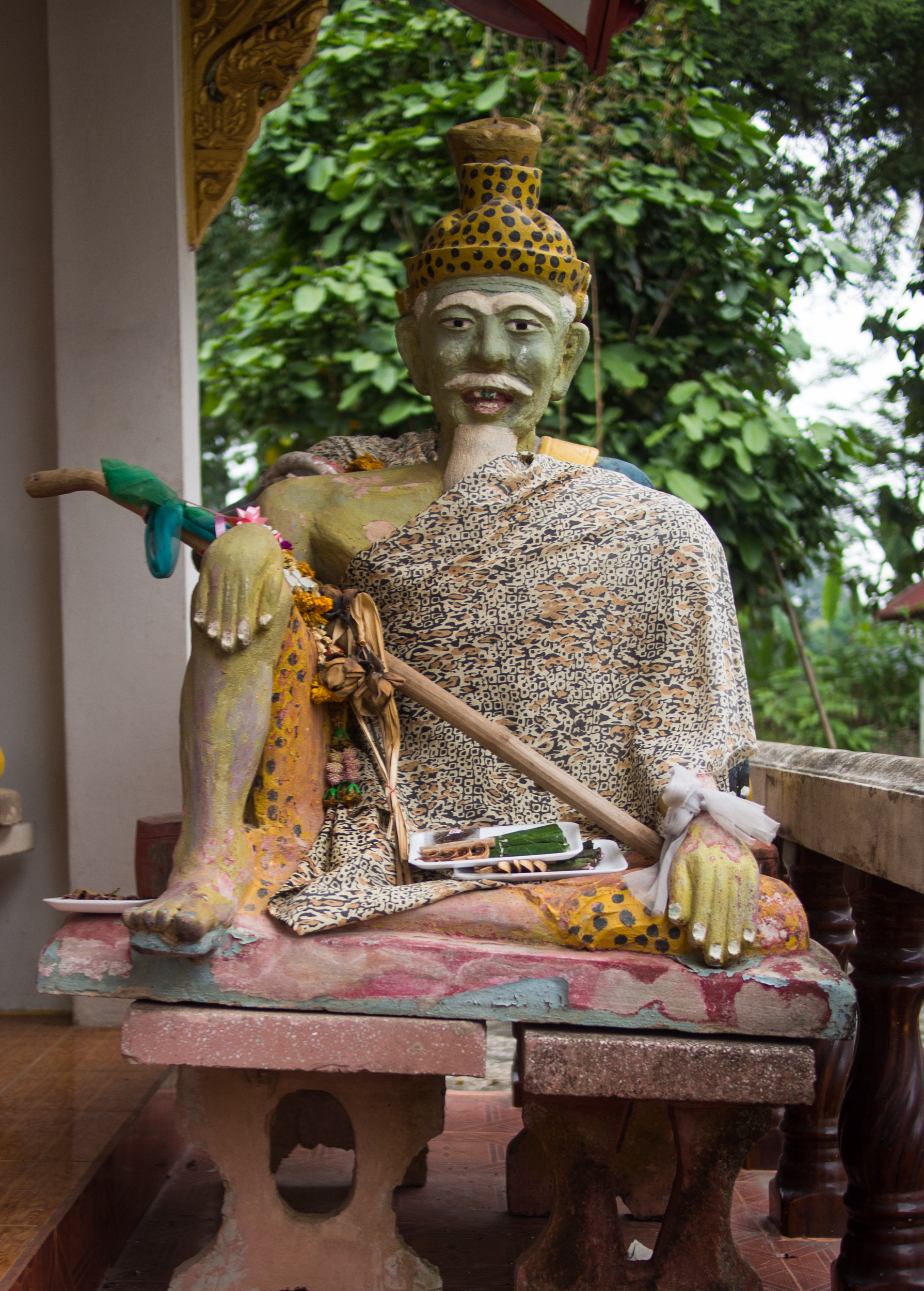
A statue of a hermit with an offering of betel quid from Thailand

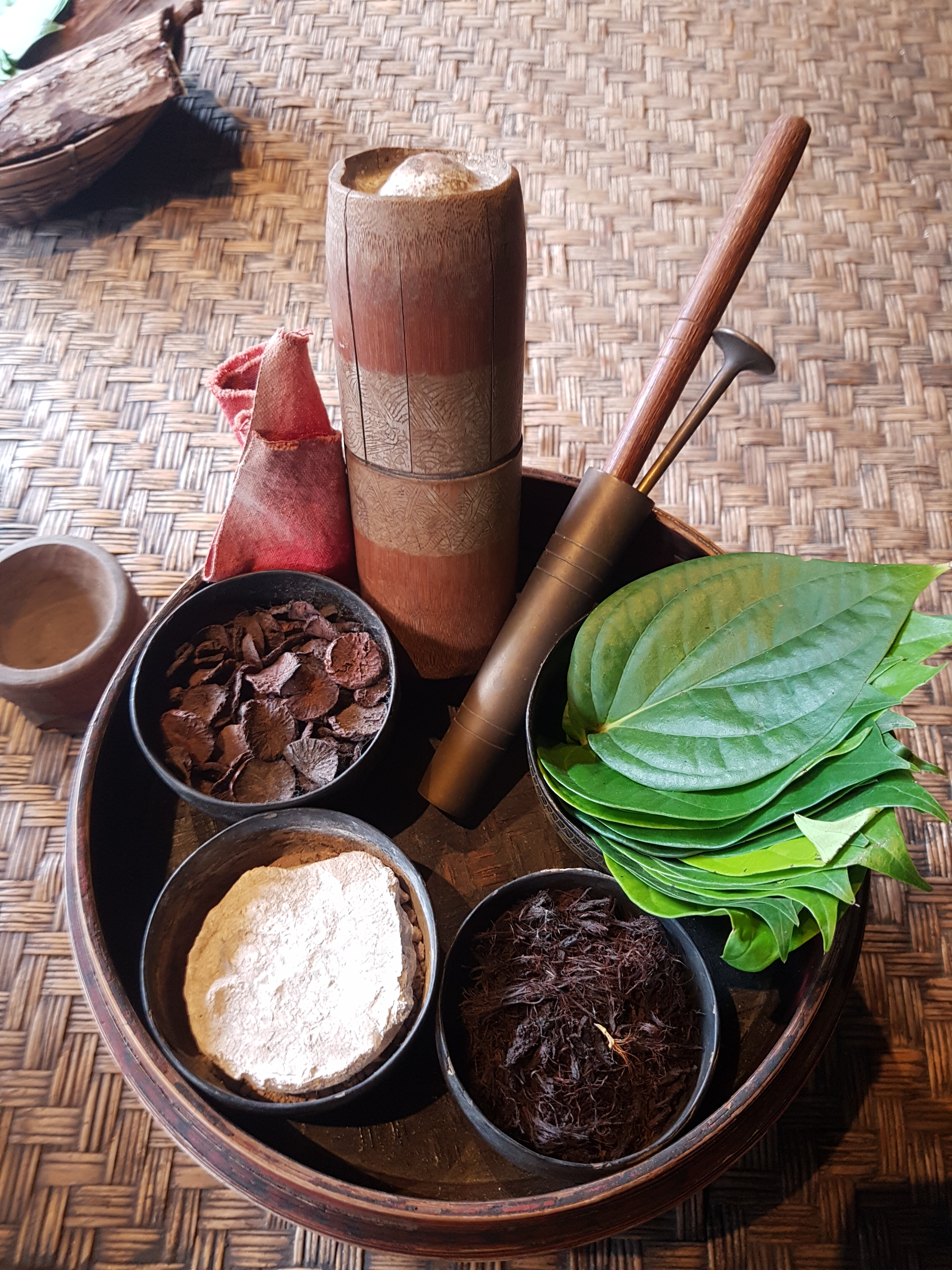
A betel preparation kit in Bangkok, Thailand

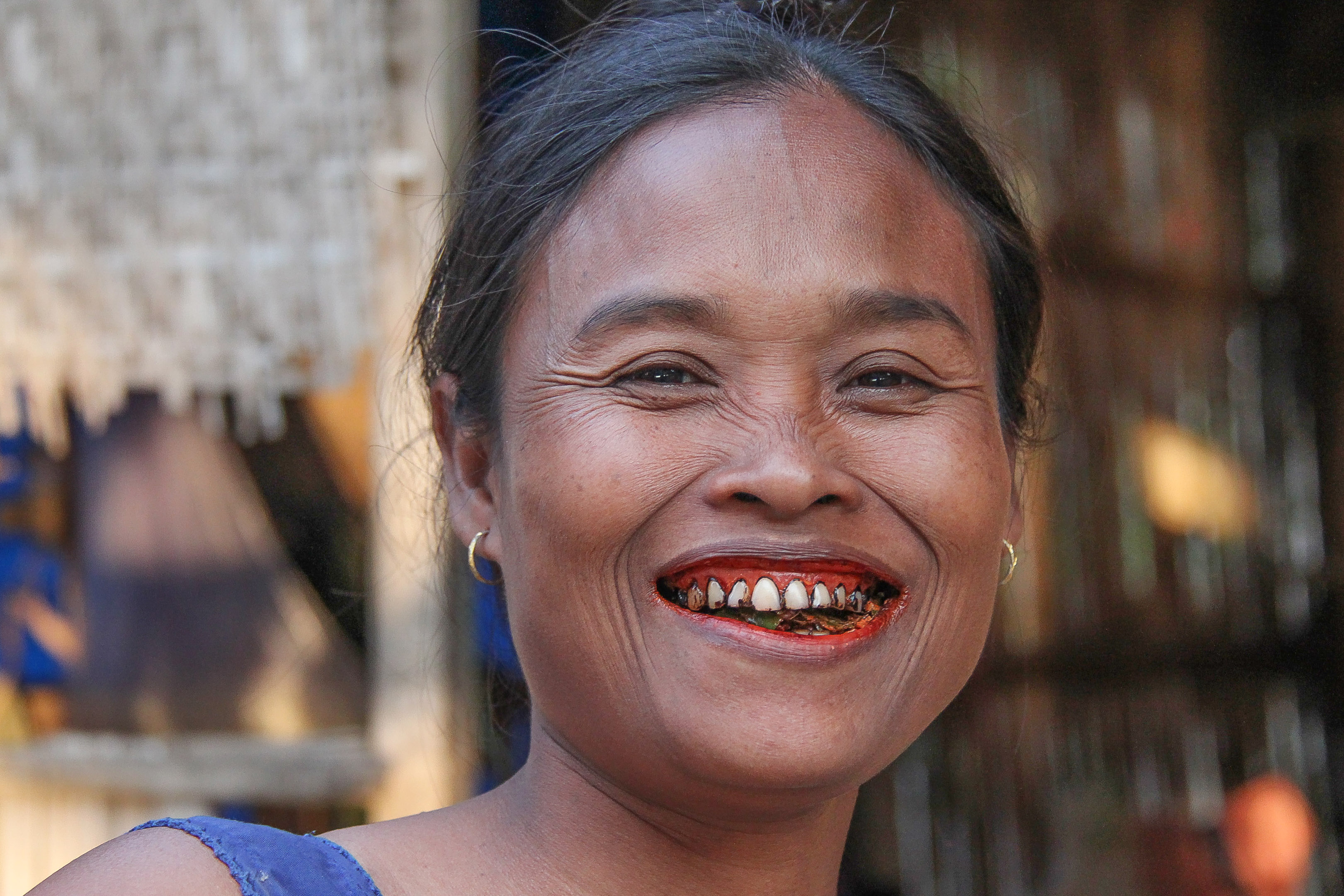
A woman in Southern Laos with the characteristic red-stained teeth and gums from chewing betel nut

=== Bangladesh ===
In Bangladesh, paan is chewed throughout the country by all classes and is an important element of Bangladeshi culture. It is the Bangladeshi 'chewing gum', and usually for chewing, a few slices of the betel nut are wrapped in a betel leaf, almost always with sliced areca nuts and often with calcium hydroxide (slaked lime), and may include cinnamon, clove, cardamom, catechu (khoyer), grated coconut and other spices for extra flavouring. As it is chewed, the peppery taste is savoured, along with the warm feeling and alertness it gives, similar to drinking a fresh cup of coffee.

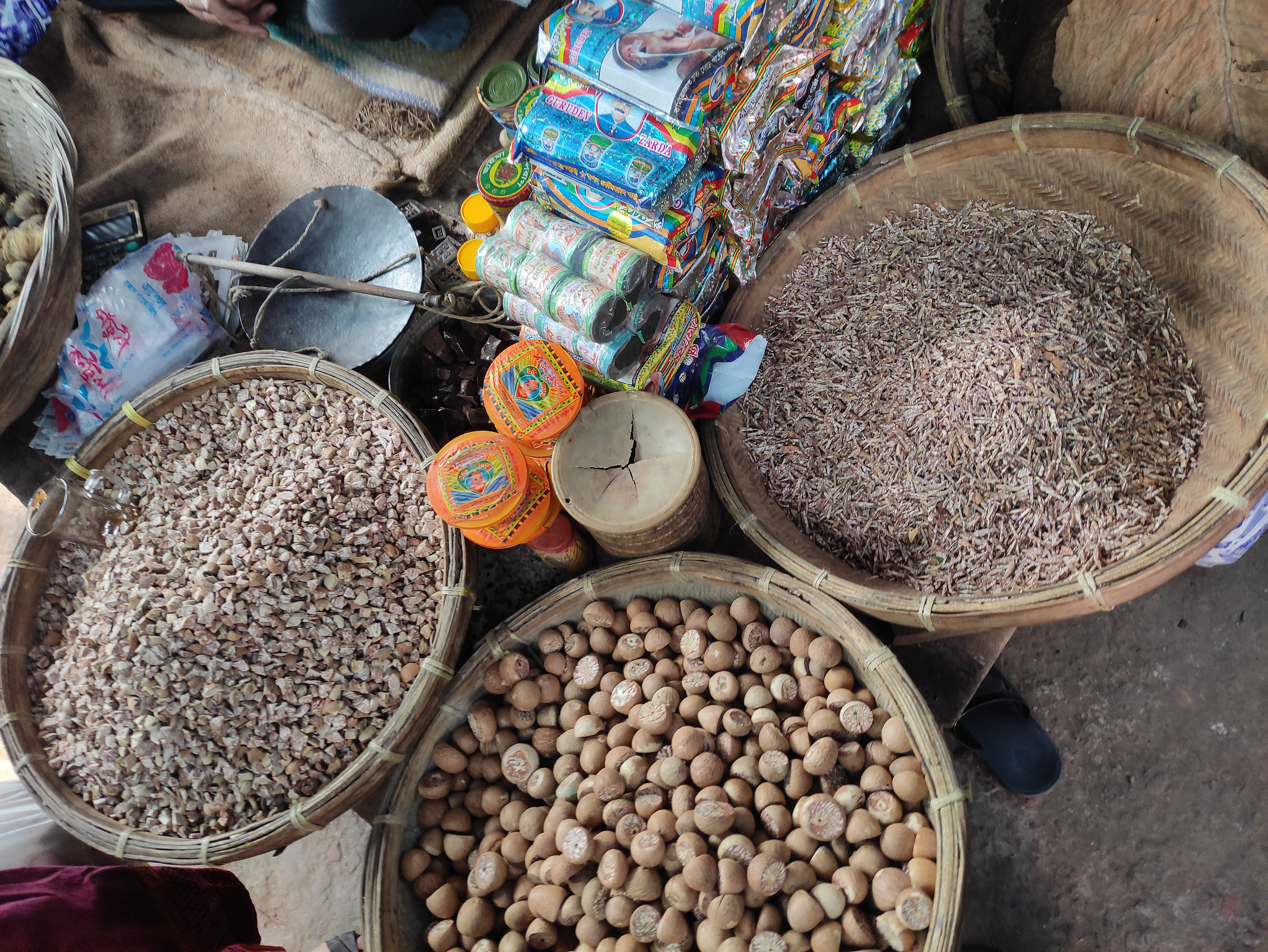
Whole and sliced areca nut with other betel nut chewing components from a Bangladeshi bazar

Paan-shupari (shupari being Bengali for areca nut) is a veritable Bangladeshi archetypal imagery, employed in wide-ranging contexts. Prior to British rule, it was chewed without tobacco, and it is still rarely chewed with tobacco. Betel leaves are arranged aesthetically on a decorated plate called paandani. During the zamindari age, paan preparation and the style of garnishing it on a plate (paandani) was indeed a recognised folk art.

In Bangladesh paan is traditionally chewed not only as a habit but also as an item of rituals, etiquette and manners. On formal occasions offering paan symbolized the time for departure. In festivals and dinners, in pujas and punyas paan is an indispensable item. Hindus make use of paans as offerings in worship.

Dhakai Khilipan, a ready pack of betel leaf processed in Dhaka is famous in the sub-continent. Old Dhakaites have a rich heritage of creating the best khili paan with many complexes, colourful, aromatic and flavorful ingredients. Although 'paan' has been a staple Bengali custom for ages, a number of high-end stores with premium quality paan has become available in recent times. Paan Supari is perhaps the first such brand, which offers a wide range of khili paan. They also offer a khili paan for diabetic patients called the "paan afsana".

The sweet paan of the Khasi tribe is famous for its special quality. Paan is also used in Hindu puja and wedding festivals and to visit relatives. It has become a ritual, tradition and culture of Bangladeshi society. Adult women gather with paandani along with friends and relatives in leisure time.

Total cultivated area under the crop in Bangladesh is about 14,175 ha and the total annual production is about 72,500 tons. The average yield per acre is 2.27 tons. There are usually three crops during the twelve months, and they are locally called by the name of the respective months in which they are harvested. Paan leaf is usually plucked in Kartik (October), Phalgun (February) and Ashad (June). The Kartik paan is considered by consumers to be the best and Ashad paan the worst. When plucking, it is a rule to leave at least sixteen leaves on the vine.

Different varieties of betel leaf are grown, and the quality differs in shape, bleaching quality, softness, pungency and aroma of leaf. Tamakh paan, a betel leaf blended with tobacco and spices. Supari paan, another variety of white leaf, Mitha paan, a sweet variety, and Sanchi paan are common varieties of betel leaves. Almost every paan-producing district has its own special variety of betel leaf of which consumers are well acquainted. In the past, the best quality of elegant camphor-scented betel leaf named Kafuri paan was produced in the Sonargaon area of Narayangonj district. It was exported to Calcutta and Middle Eastern countries.

The next best is the Sanchi paan grown in Chittagong hill tracts. This variety is not very popular among Bangali people. It is exported to Pakistan for the consumers of Karachi. The commoner varieties are called Desi, Bangla, Bhatial, Dhaldoga, Ghas paan. Bangla paan, is also known as Mitha paan, Jhal paan or paan of Rajshahi. At present, this variety is becoming extinct, due to emergence of more profitable and lucrative fast-growing varieties of paan crops. Normally, betel leaves are consumed with chun (quicklime), seed cinnamon, cardamoms and other flavored elements.

=== China ===
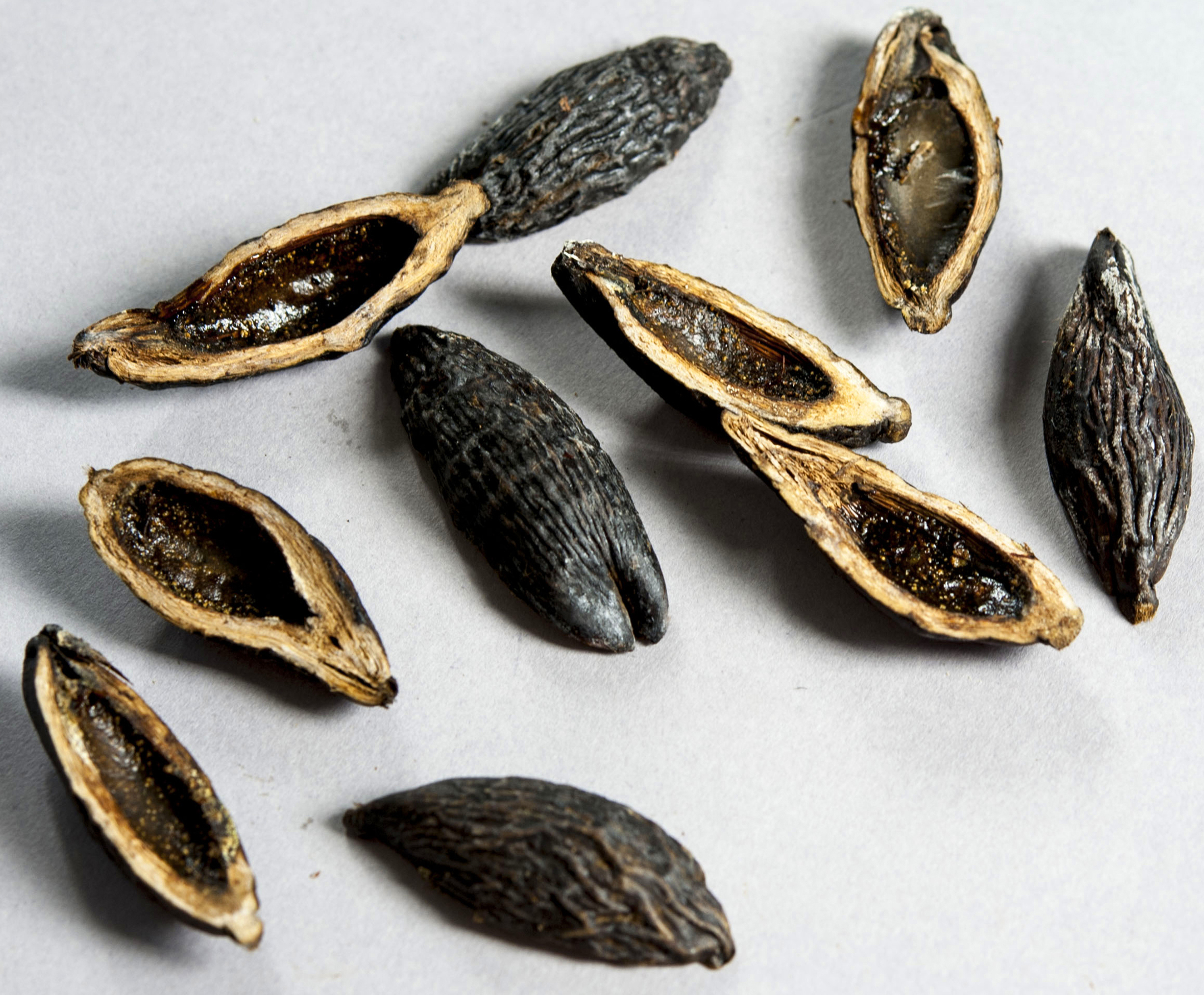
Dried and chopped betel nut, Hunan province

Betel chewing in China has a long history, particularly in the southern provinces. In modern times, betel nut chewing is popular nationwide. The social debate over betel nut chewing has led the Chinese government to introduce some restrictions, although almost all cities still allow the production, sale, and consumption of betel nut.

=== India ===
In a 16th-century cookbook, Nimatnama-i Nasiruddin-Shahi, describes Ghiyas-ud-din Khalji, the Sultan of Mandu (r. 1469–1500), watches as tender betel leaves of the finest quality are spread out and rosewater is sprinkled on them, while saffron is also added. An elaborate betel chew or paan would contain fragrant spices and rose preserves with chopped areca nuts.

It is a tradition in South India and nearby regions to give two Betel leaves, areca nut (pieces or whole) and Coconut to the guests (both male and female) at any auspicious occasion. Even on a regular day, it is the tradition to give a married woman, who visits the house, two Betel leaves, areca nut and coconut or some fruits along with a string of threaded flowers. This is referred to as thamboolam. Paan is symbol of Prosperity in indian tradition and part of most of rituals followed.

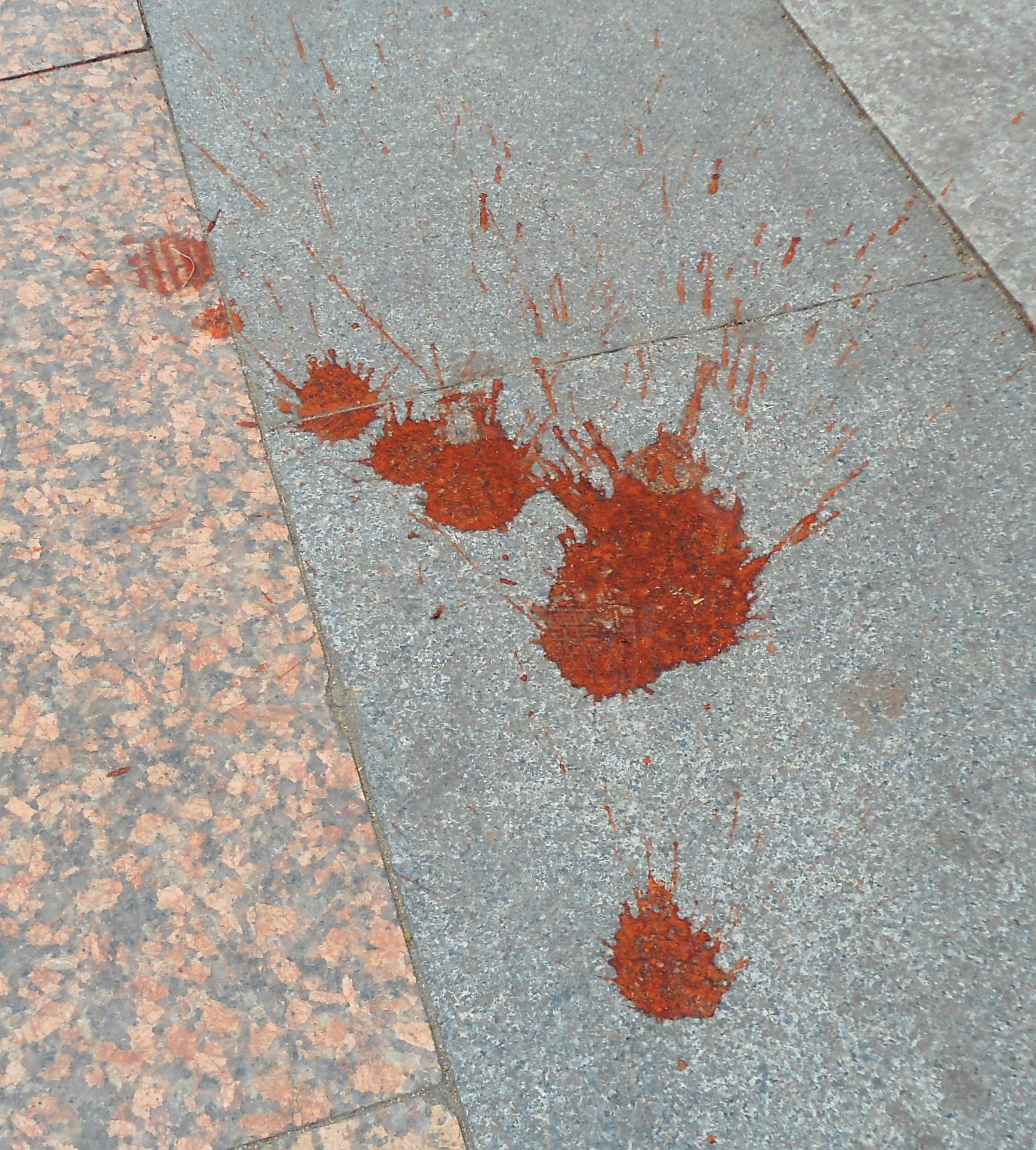
Use of this drug causes profuse red coloured salivation. This saliva is spat out, yielding stains and biological waste pollution in public spaces. Many countries and municipalities have laws to prevent betel quid spit.

Betel leaf used to make paan is produced in different parts of India. Some states that produce betel leaf for paan include West Bengal, Bihar, Assam, Andhra Pradesh, Uttar Pradesh. In West Bengal, two types of betel leaves are produced. These are Bangla patta (Bengali leaf/Country Leaf) and Mitha patta (Sweet Leaf). In West Bengal, Bangla patta is produced mainly in district of Dinajpur, Malda, Jalpaiguri, and Nadia. Mitha patta is produced in places such as Midnapur and South 24 Parganas.

The skilled paan maker is known as a paanwala in North India. In other parts, paanwalas are also known as panwaris or panwadis. At North India, there is a tradition to chew paan after Deepawali puja for blessings.

In the Indian state of Maharashtra, the paan culture is widely criticised due to the cleanliness problems created by people who spit in public places. In Mumbai, there have been attempts to paint pictures of Hindu gods in places where people commonly tend to spit, in the hope that this would discourage spitting, but success has been limited and there is need a solution at root to avoid peek. One of the great Marathi artists P L Deshpande wrote a comic story on the subject of paanwala (paan vendor) and performed a televised reading session on Doordarshan during the 1980s in his unique style.

Paan is losing its appeal to farmers because of falling demand. Consumers prefer chewing tobacco formulations such as gutka over paan. Higher costs, water scarcity and unpredictable weather have made betel gardens less lucrative.

According to StraitsResearch, The India pan masala market is expected to reach US$10,365 million by 2026 at the CAGR of 10.4% during the forecast period 2019–2026. The India pan masala market is driven by significant switching of consumers from tobacco products to pan masala, aggressive advertising and convenient packaging, and Maharashtra State's revocation of the ban over pan masala products.

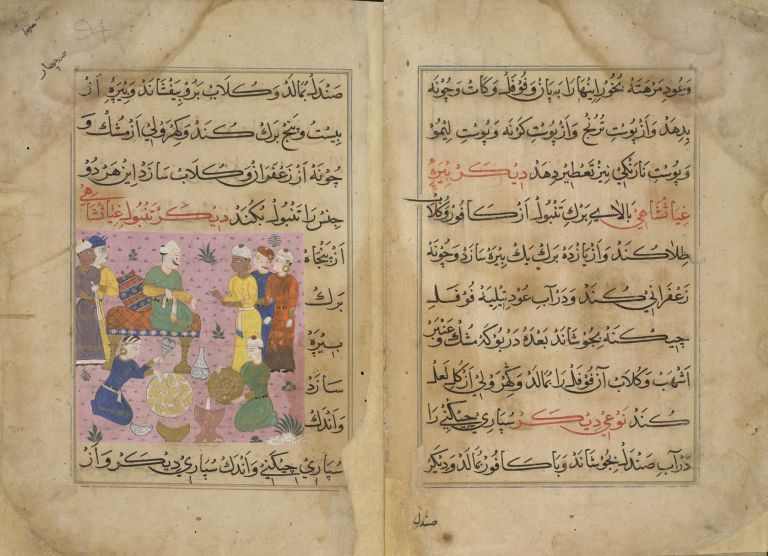
Ghiyath Shah, the Sultan of Mandu, India (r. 1469–1500), Malwa Sultanate, describes the elaborate way to prepare betel nut, folio from 16th century cookbook, medieval Indian Nimatnama-i-Nasiruddin-Shahi.

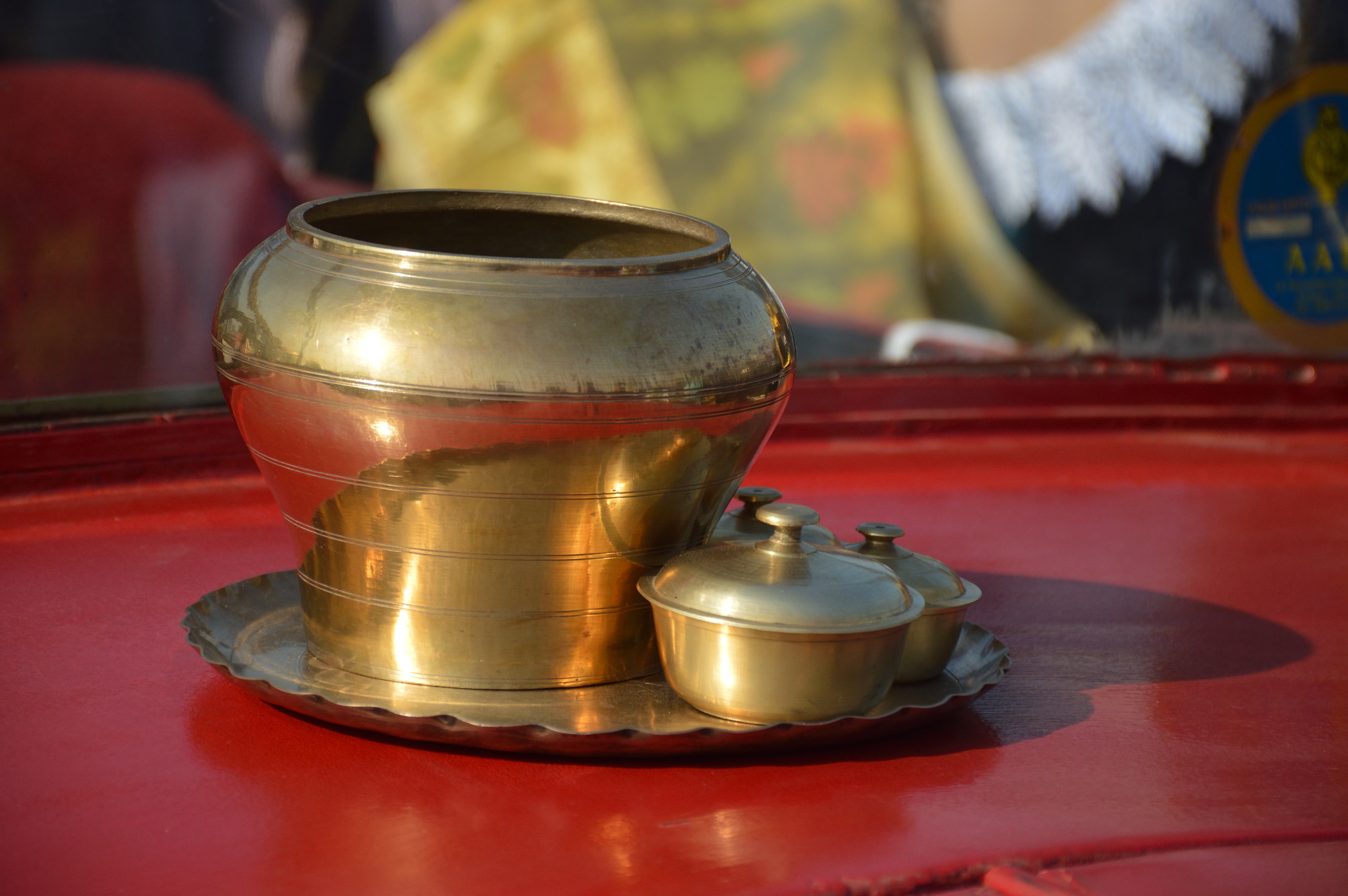
Paan pot in Kolkata, India.

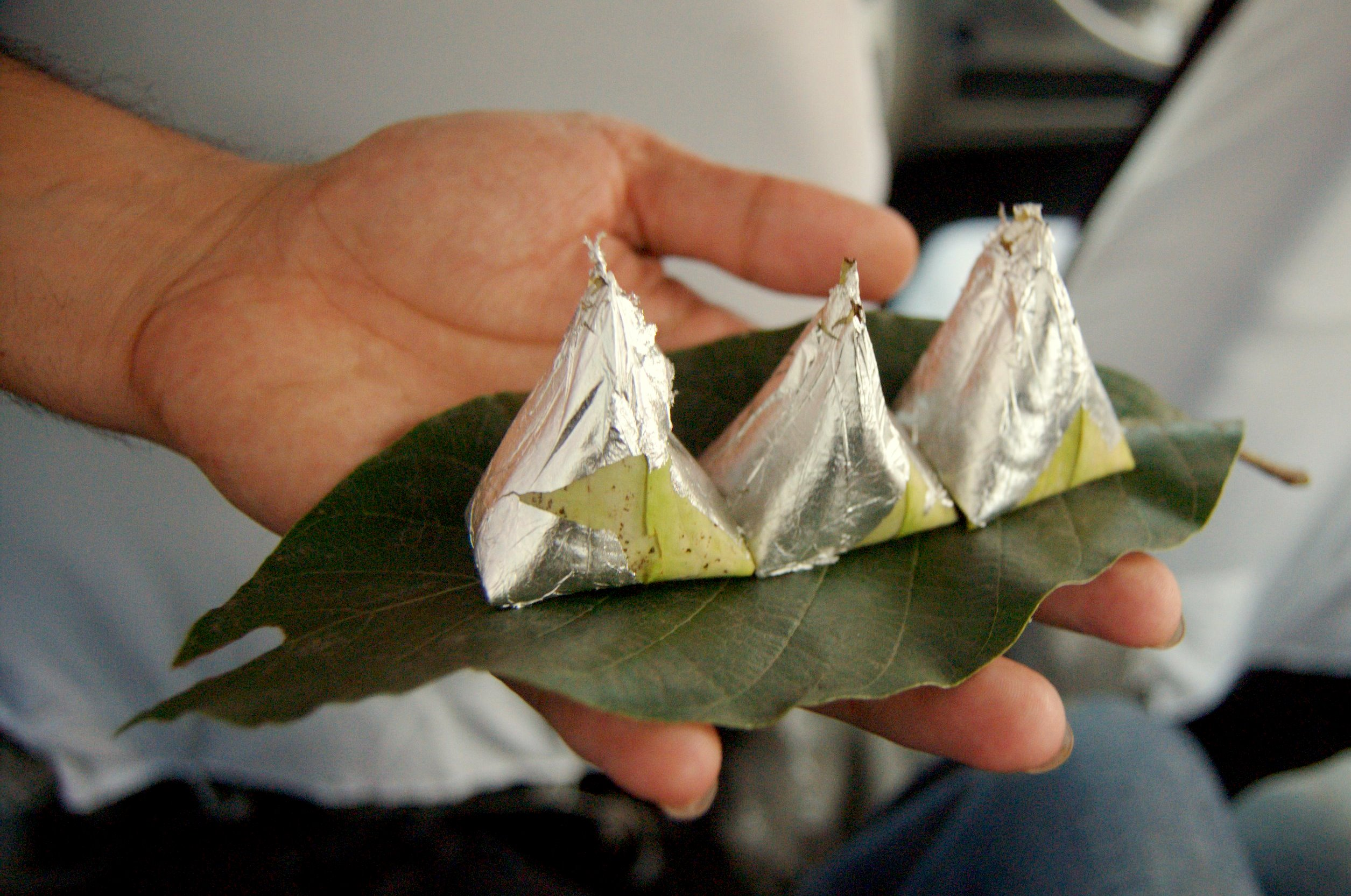
Paan (betel leaves) being served with silver foil at Sarnath near Varanasi, India

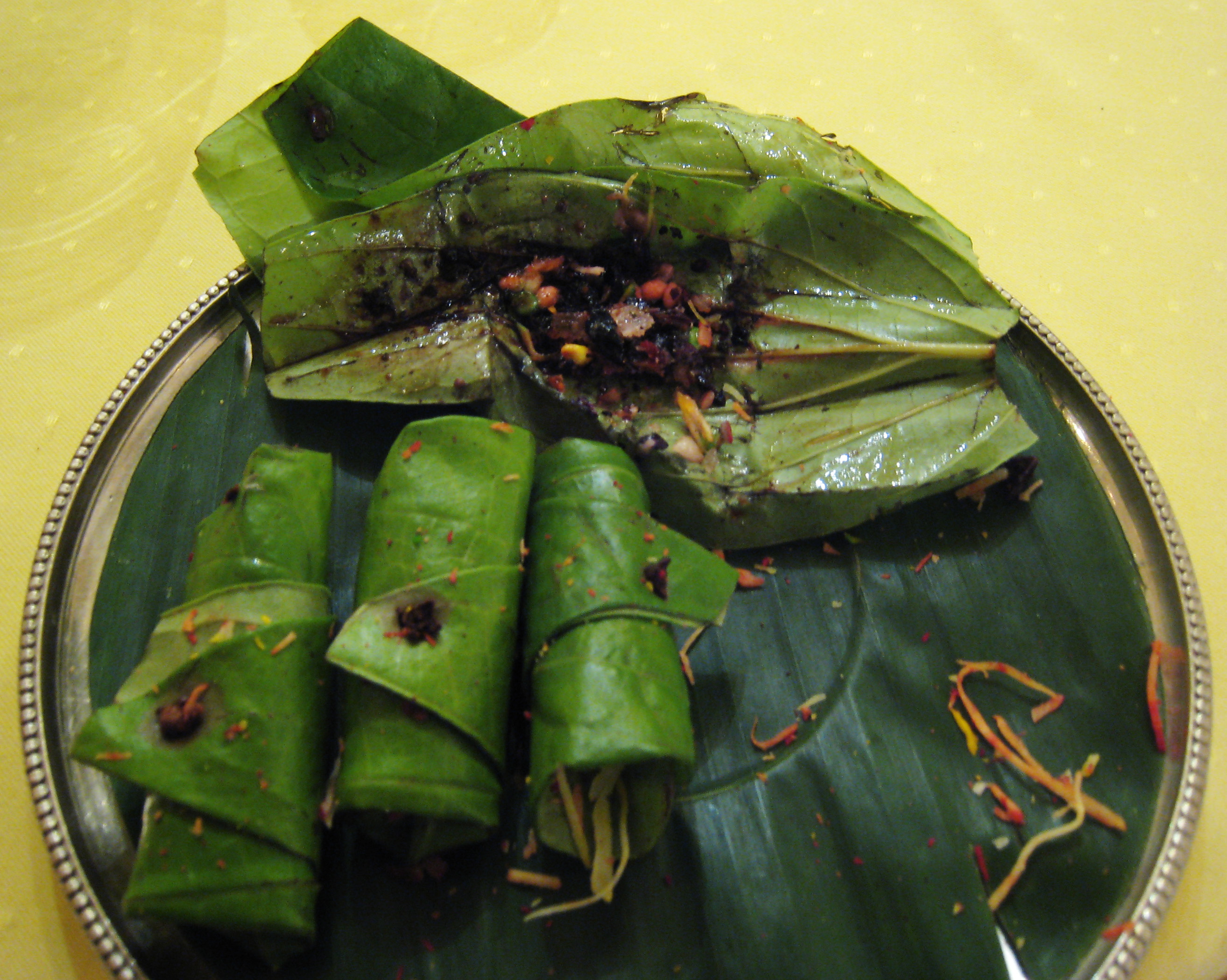
South Indian style Paan

Chocolate paan in a store in Bangalore (2026)

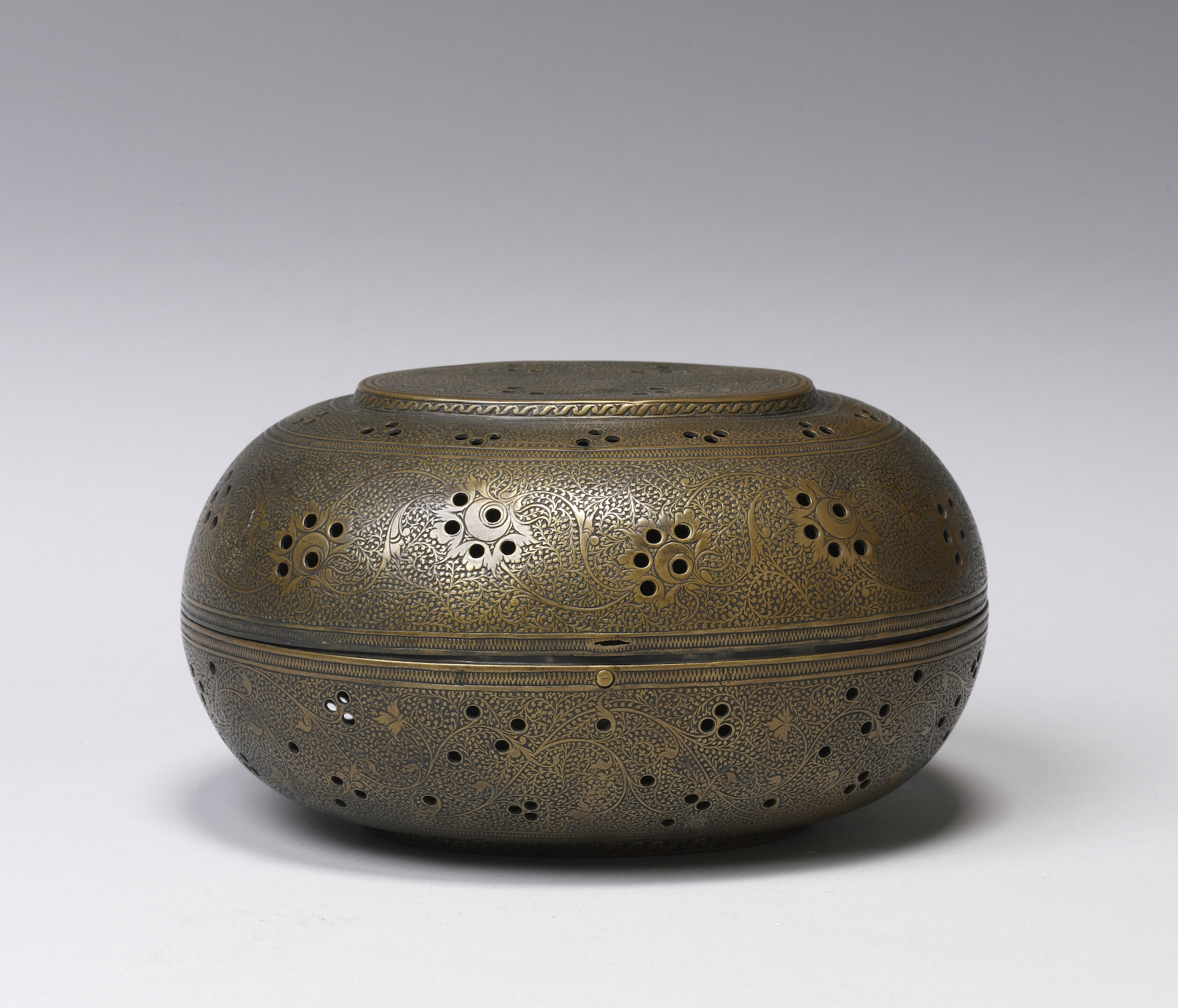
Paan dan from Punjab, India, 19th century, Walters Art Museum, Baltimore.

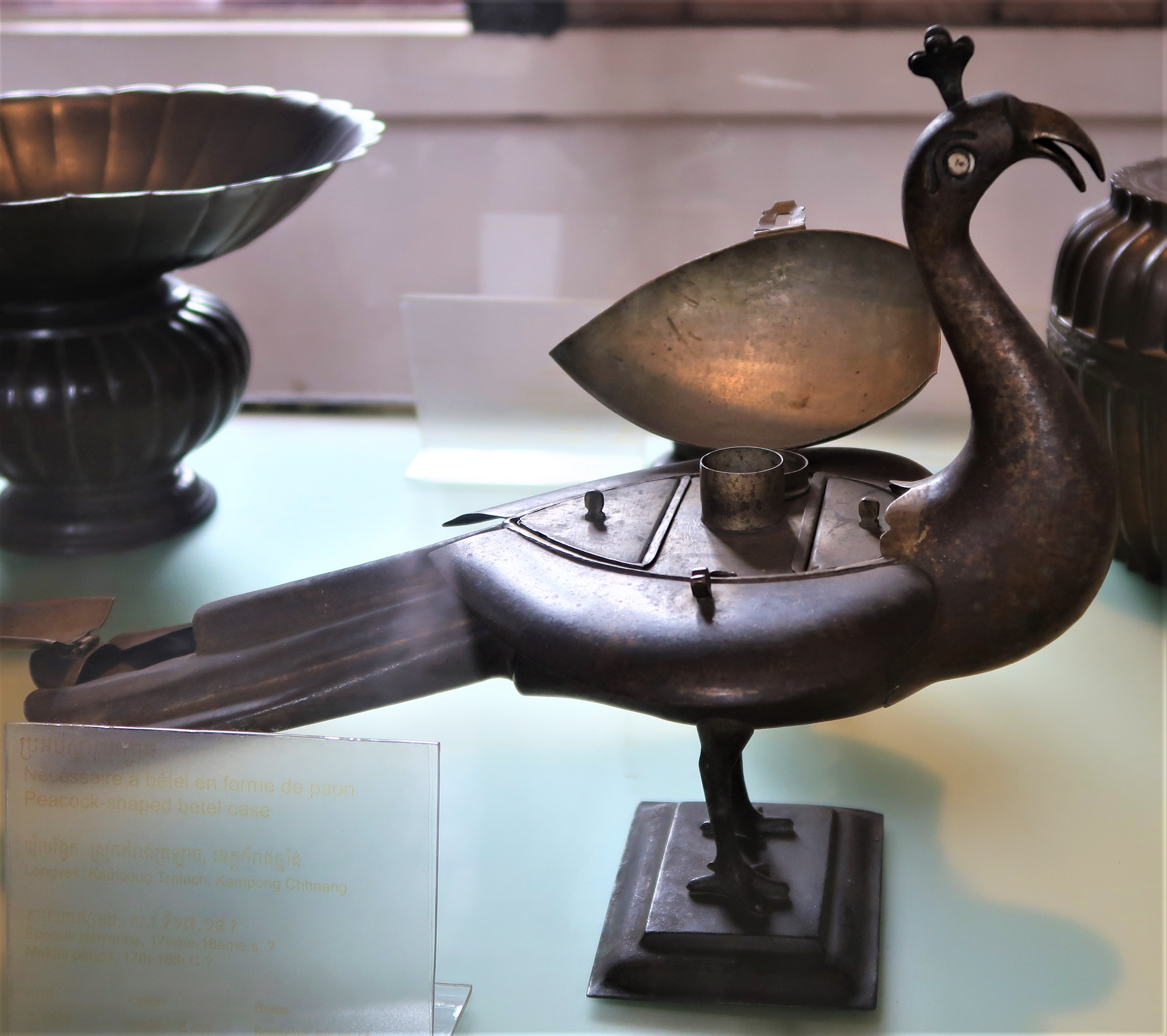
Paan dan in shape of peacock. Originally from India, it is currently kept in a British museum.

==== Assam ====
In Assam, India, betel nut is traditionally offered as a mark of respect and auspicious beginnings. Paan-tamul (betel leaves and raw areca nut) may be offered to guests after tea or meals, served in a brass plate with stands called bota. The areca nut also appears as a fertility symbol in religious and marriage ceremonies. When showing respect to elders or asking for forgiveness, people, especially newlyweds place a pair of paan-tamul on a xorai, place it in front of the elders and bow to show respect.

Guests may be invited to a wedding reception by offering a few areca nuts with betel leaves. During Bihu, the husori players are offered areca nuts and betel leaves by each household while their blessings are solicited.

Paan-tamul is also offered to guests after the end of every feast, usually the paan-tamul-soon, or slaked lime with cardamom pods in it to freshen the breath.

==== Banarasi Paan ====
Banarasi paan of Banaras (Varanasi) is widely famous among Indians and tourists visiting India.

=== Indonesia and Malaysia ===
Bersirih, nyirih, or menginang is a historical Malayonesian tradition of chewing materials such as nut, betel, gambier, tobacco, clove, and limestone.

In the Malay Archipelago, the menginang or betel nut chewing has become a revered activity in local tradition; being a ceremoniously conducted gesture to honour guests. A complete and elaborate set of sirih pinang equipment is called tepak, puan, pekinangan, or cerana. The set is usually made of wooden lacquerware, brass or silverwares; and it consists of the combol (containers), bekas sirih (leaf container), kacip (press-knife to cut areca nut), gobek (small pestle and mortar), and ketur (spittoon).

Two breakfast talk shows are named after the activity: Sekapur Sirih ("Lime and Betel") in 1987, and Seulas Pinang ("A Slice of Areca") later in 1993; both from Malaysia's TV3 aired on Sundays and Fridays respectively until 1994.

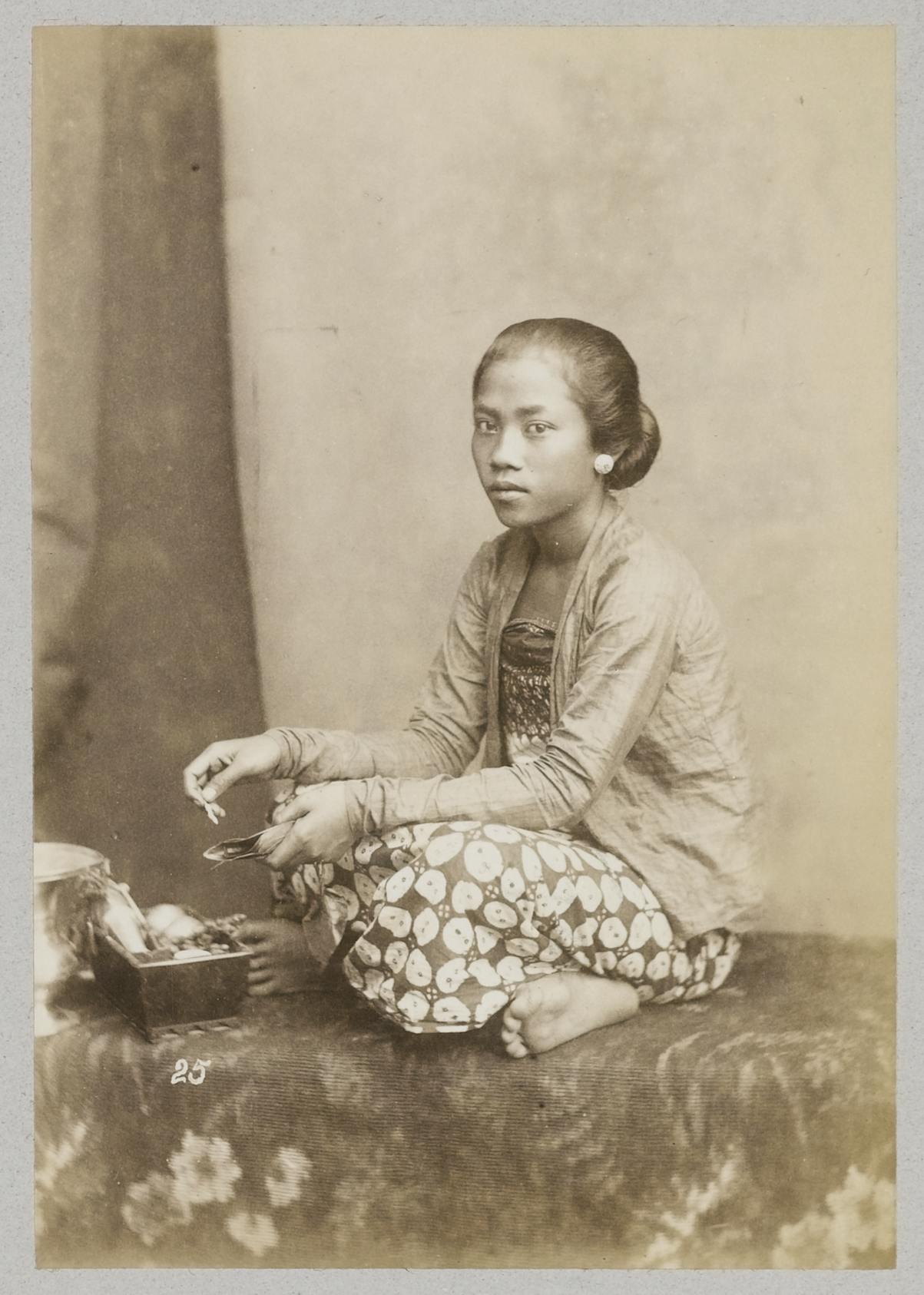
A Javanese woman preparing betel leaf, c. 1880

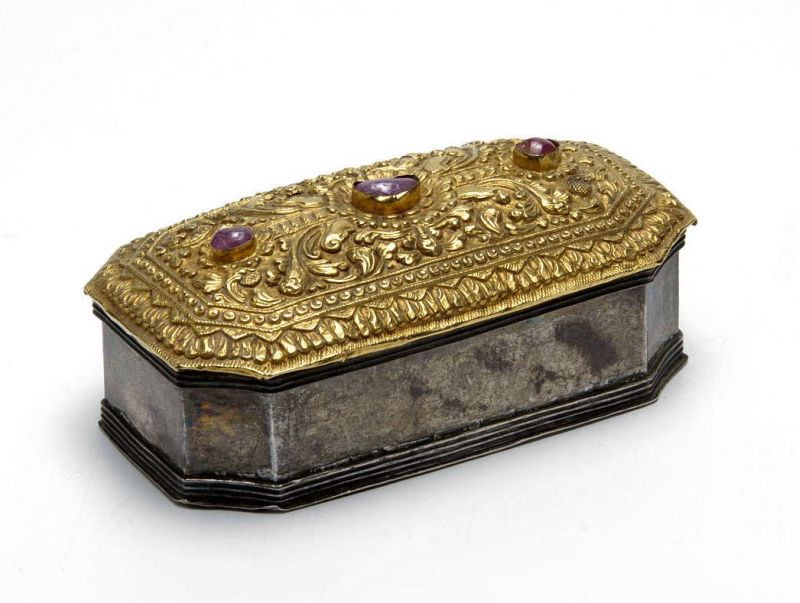
Balinese cerana or betel nut container

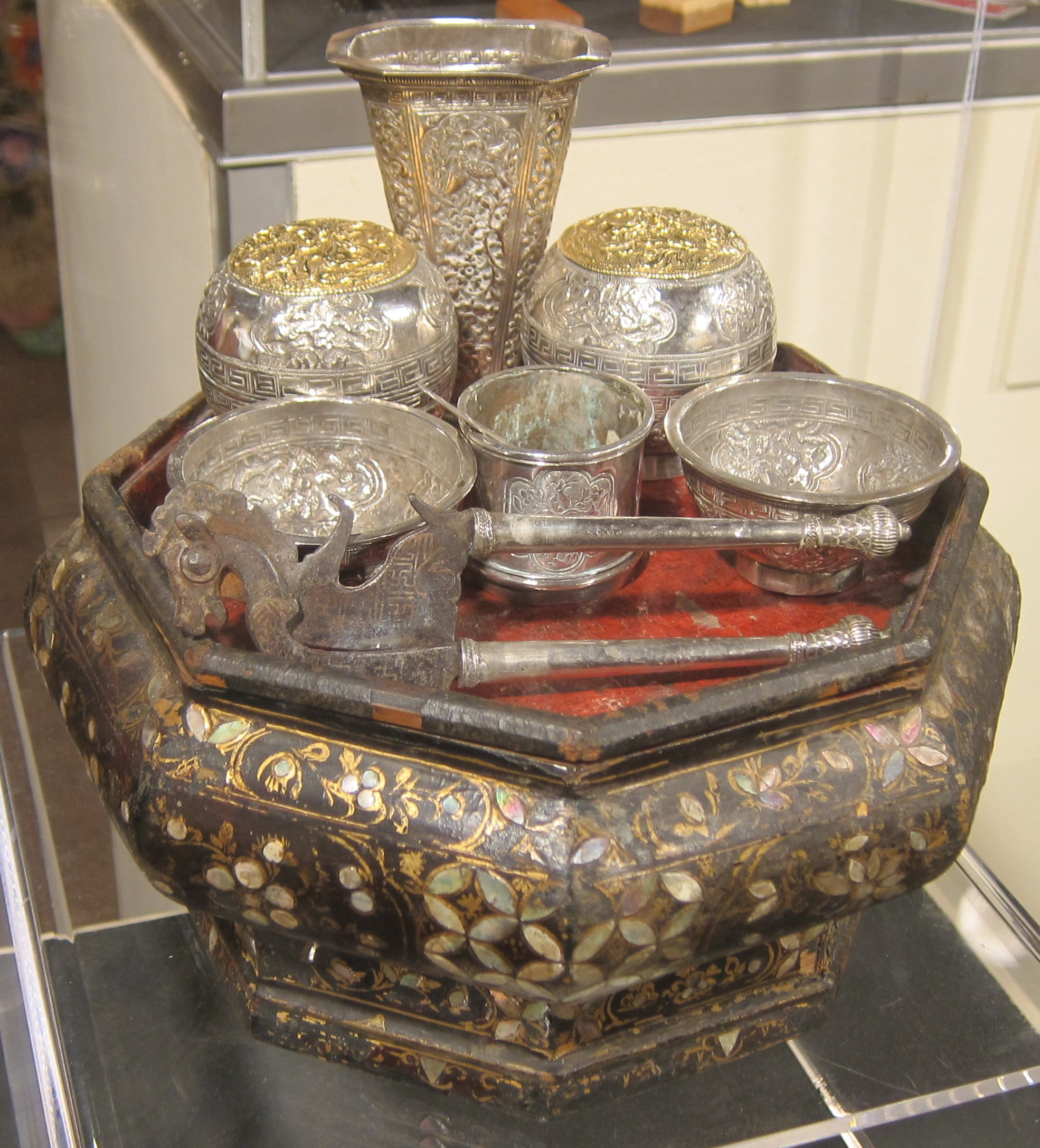
Betel nut preparation kit (tepak sireh) made from wood inlaid with silver, gold, and mother of pearl from Malaysia (early 20th century)

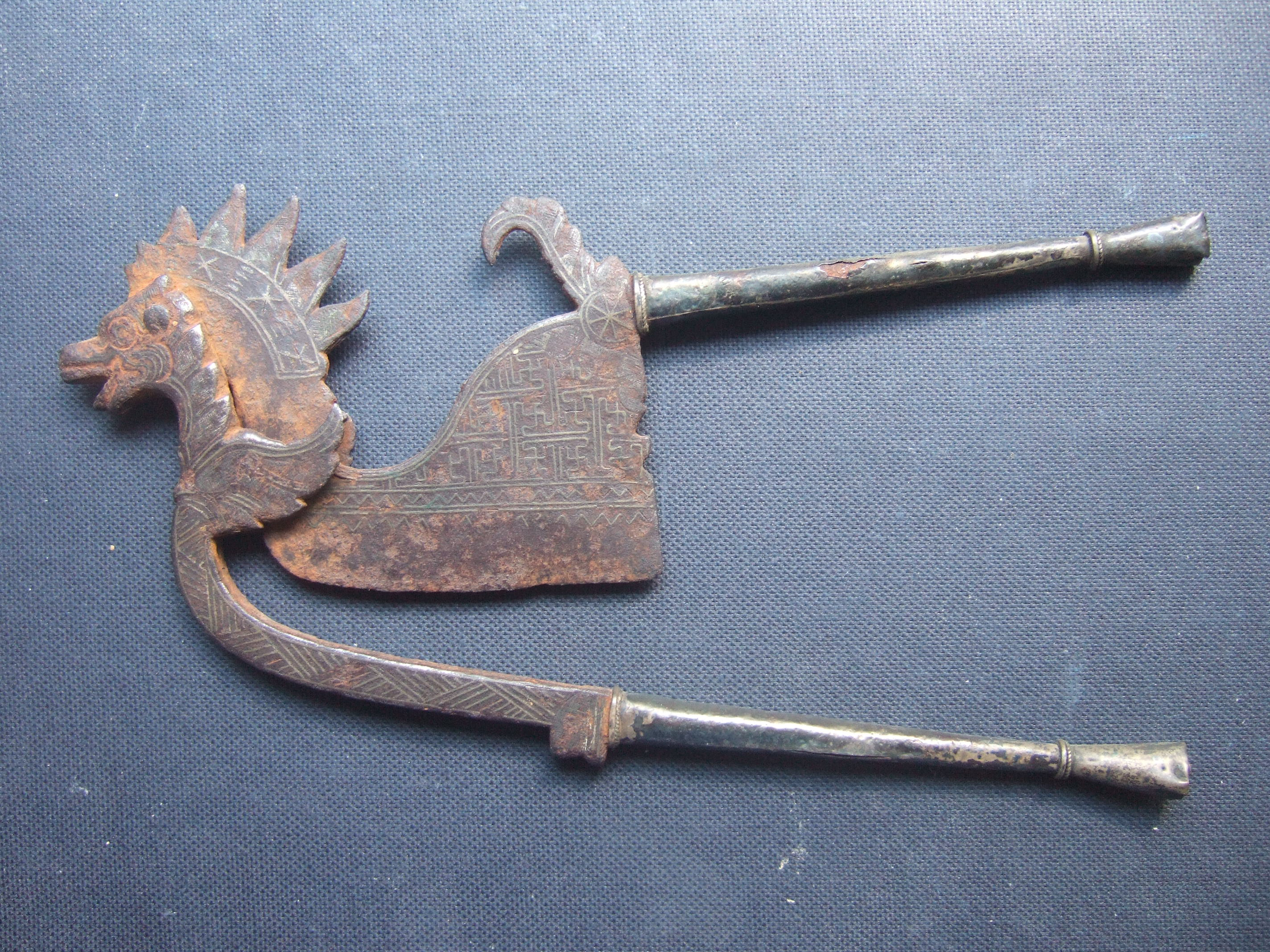
Betel nut cutter from Indonesia

=== Micronesia ===
Betel nut chewing is common among the native ethnic groups of Micronesia. They can be grouped into two different traditions. The betel nut chewing tradition of the Chamorro people of the Mariana Islands (Chamorro: pugua') prefer ripe (red) areca nuts. The betel nut chewing tradition of the Chuukese, Palauan, and Yapese people, on the other hand, prefer unripe (green) areca nuts. Betel leaf and lime are included in the quid, and commonly tobacco. Flavoring ingredients like ginger, cardamom, and vodka are also sometimes added.

Areca palms have been grown traditionally in Guam, Palau, and Yap since ancient times. It spread to Chuuk in modern times. Betel nut stains have been found in ancient remains of the Chamorro people, indicating that the practice was carried into Micronesia by their Austronesian ancestors in Island Southeast Asia.

=== Myanmar ===
Kwun-ya (ကွမ်းယာ [kóːn.jà]) is the word for betel quid in Myanmar, formerly Burma, where the most common configuration for chewing is a betel vine leaf (Piper betel), areca nut (from Areca catechu), slaked lime (calcium hydroxide) and some spices, although many betel chewers also use tobacco.

Betel chewing has very long tradition in Burma, having been practised since before the beginning of recorded history. Until the 1960s, both men and women loved it and every household used to have a special lacquerware box for betel quid, called kun-it (ကွမ်းအစ်), which would be offered to any visitor together with cheroots to smoke and green tea to drink. The leaves are kept inside the bottom of the box, which looks like a small hat box, but with a top tray for small tins, silver in well-to-do homes, of various other ingredients such as the betel nuts, slaked lime, cutch, anise seed and a nut cutter.

The sweet form (acho) is popular with the young, but grownups tend to prefer it with cardamom, cloves and tobacco. Spittoons, therefore, are still ubiquitous, and signs saying "No betel quid-spitting" are commonplace, as it makes a messy red splodge on floors and walls; many people display betel-stained teeth from the habit. Betel quid stalls and kiosks used to be run mainly by people of Indian origin in towns and cities. Smokers who want to quit would also use betel nut to wean themselves off tobacco.

Taungoo in Lower Burma is where the best areca palms are grown indicated by the popular expression "like a betel lover taken to Taungoo". Other parts of the country contribute to the best betel quid according to another saying "Tada-U for the leaves, Ngamyagyi for the tobacco, Taungoo for the nuts, Sagaing for the slaked lime, Pyay for the cutch". Kun, hsay, lahpet (betel quid, tobacco and pickled tea) are deemed essential items to offer monks and elders particularly in the old days. Young maidens traditionally carry ornamental betel boxes on a stand called kundaung and gilded flowers (pandaung) in a shinbyu (novitiation) procession. Burmese history also mentions an ancient custom of a condemned enemy asking for "a betel quid and a drink of water" before being executed.

An anecdotal government survey indicated that 40% of men and 20% of women in Myanmar chew betel. An aggregate study of cancer registries (2002 to 2007) at the Yangon and Mandalay General Hospitals, the largest hospitals in the country, found that oral cancer was the 6th most common cancer among males, and 10th among females. Of these oral carcinoma patients, 36% were regular betel quid chewers. University of Dental Medicine, Yangon records from 1985 to 1988 showed that 58.6% of oral carcinoma patients were regular betel chewers.

Since the 1990s, betel chewing has been actively discouraged by successive governments, from the State Law and Order Restoration Council (SLORC) onward, on the grounds of health and tidiness. In April 1995, the Yangon City Development Committee banned betel in Yangon (Rangoon), in anticipation of Visit Myanmar Year 1996, a massive effort to promote the country as a tourist destination. Effective 29 July 2007, betel chewing, along with smoking, has been banned from the Shwedagon Pagoda, the country's most important religious site. In 2010, the Ministry of Education's Department of Basic Education and Burma's Anti-Narcotics Task Force collaborated to prohibit betel shops from operating within 50 metres (160 ft) of any school.

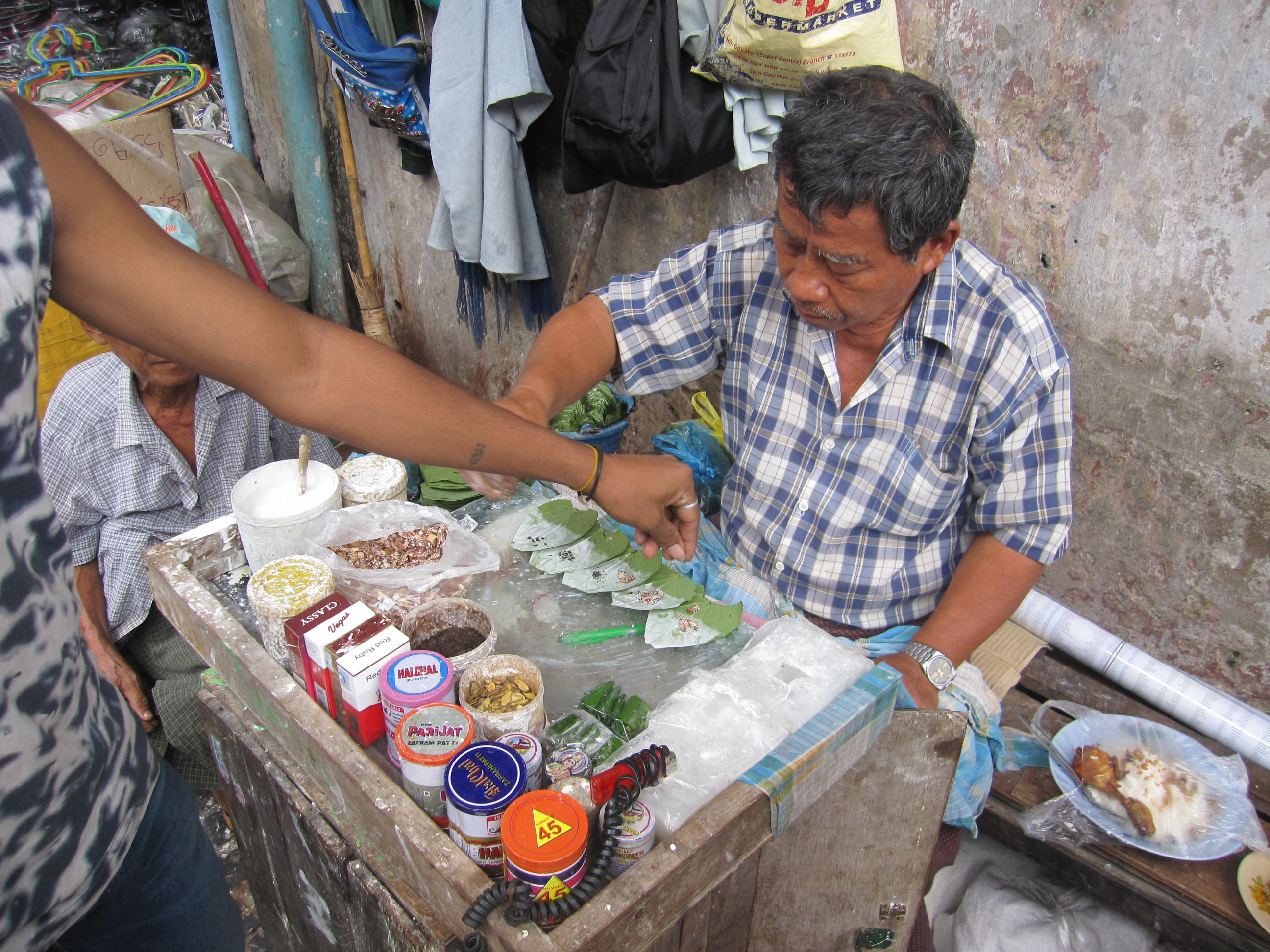
Betel quid vendor at Bogyoke Market in Yangon, Myanmar

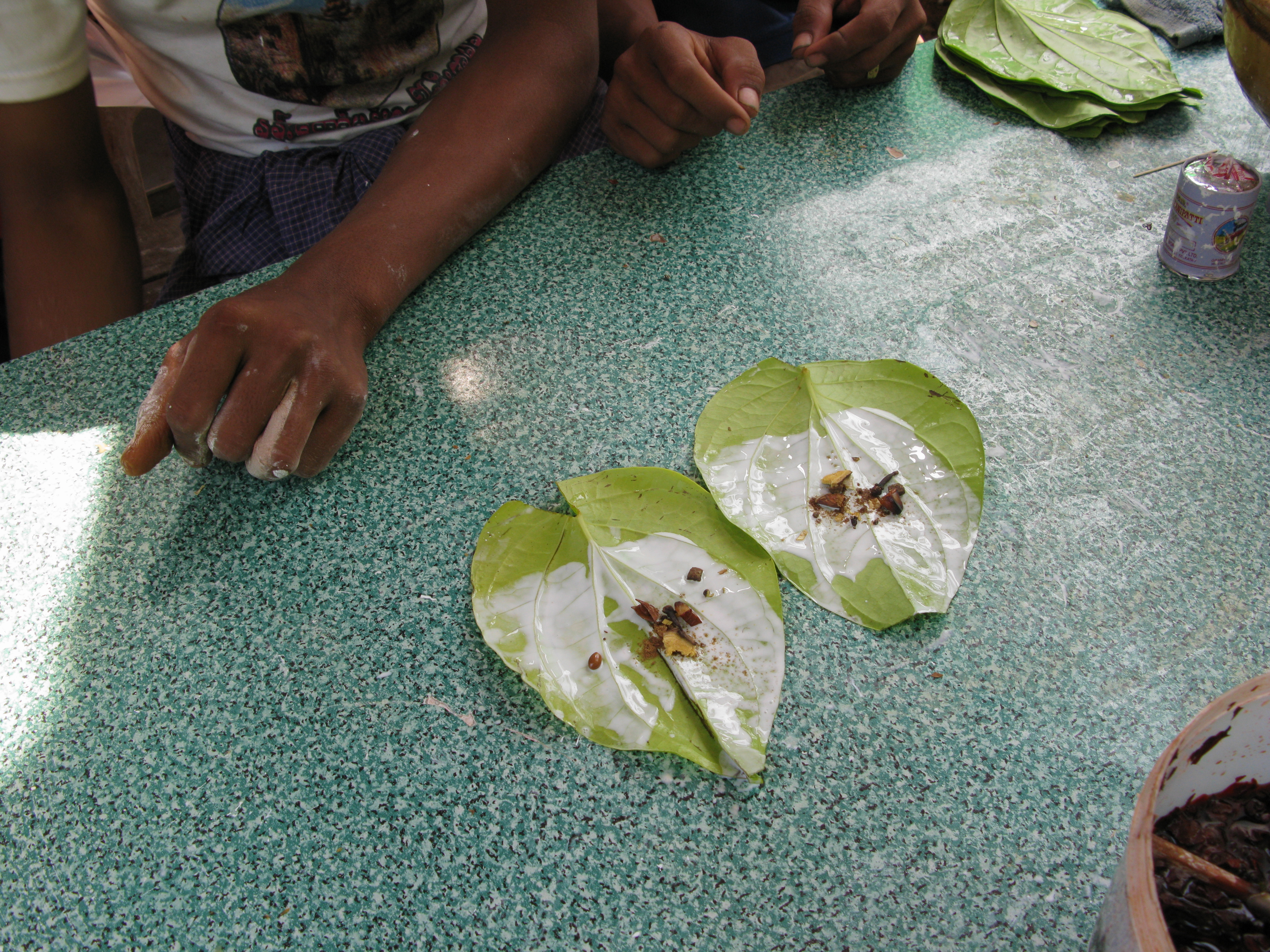
Betel quid preparation, Myanmar.

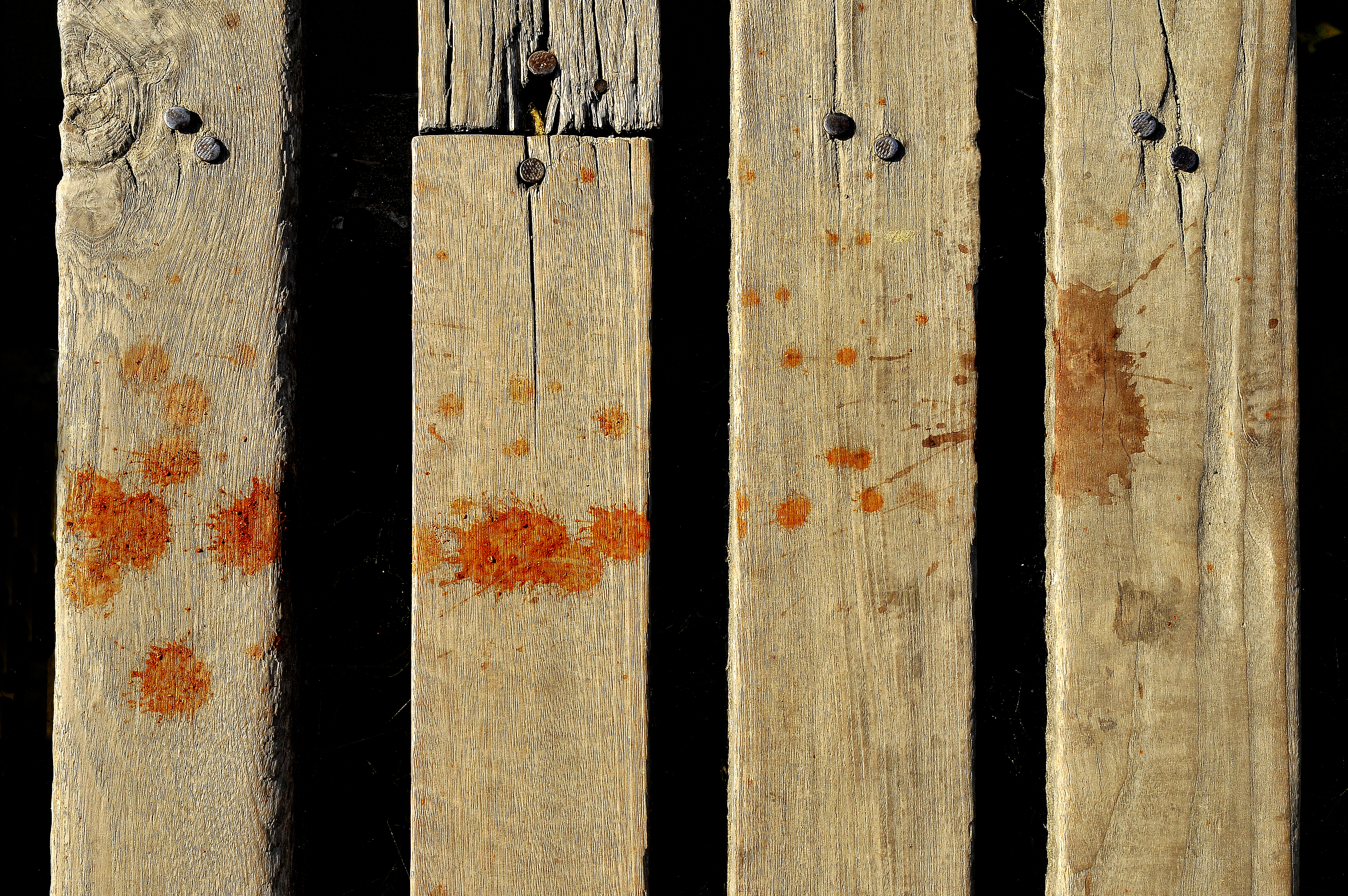
Red betel quid spit on a bridge in Mandalay

=== Nepal ===
Paan is chewed mainly by Terai people, although migrants in Terai have also taken up chewing paan in recent times. Throughout Terai, paan is as common as anywhere in northern India. There is some local production, generally not commercial, but most leaves are imported from India. Although not as ubiquitous as in the Terai, most residents of Kathmandu occasionally enjoy paan. A sweet version of paan called meetha paan is popular amongst many who do not like the strong taste of plain (sada) paan. Some parents allow their children to consume meetha on special occasions because it is tobacco-free.

=== Pakistan ===
The consumption of paan has long been a very popular cultural tradition in Pakistan, especially in the port city of Karachi, although the tradition is dying among the younger generation. In general, though, paan is an occasional delicacy thoroughly enjoyed by many, and almost exclusively bought from street vendors instead of any preparations at home. Pakistan grows a large variety of betel leaf, specifically in the coastal areas of Sindh, although paan is also imported in large quantities from Bangladesh and Sri Lanka.

The culture of chewing paan has also spread in Punjab, where a paan shop can be found in almost every street and market. In the famous Anarkali Bazar in Lahore a street called paan gali is dedicated for paan and other Pakistani products.

The rate of oral cancer has grown substantially in Pakistan due to chewing of paan.

=== Philippines ===
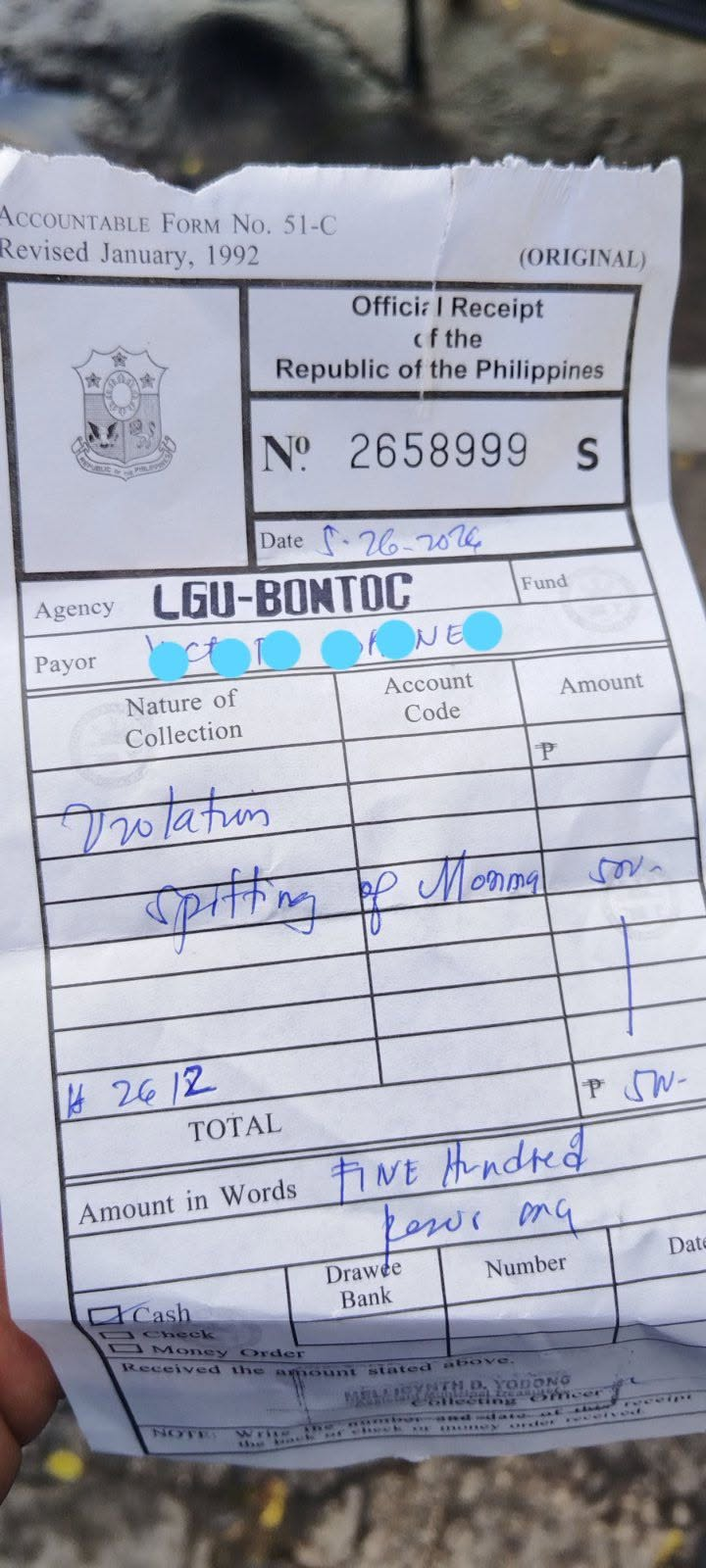
A violation receipt for spitting of momma (betel nut).

Betel nut chewing was formerly widespread among the ethnic groups of the Philippines. The country is where the areca palm (Areca catechu) is originally native to and where the tradition started before being spread via the Austronesian expansion (see history section). The Philippines also has the highest genetic diversity in Areca catechu populations and is home to several closely related Areca palm species, including a couple of endemic species that are used as (inferior) substitutes for Areca catechu, these are Areca caliso (known as kaliso or sakolon) and Areca ipot (known as ipot or saksik). Several varieties of Areca catechu nuts were also known in the Philippines, distinguished chiefly by the shape of the fruits.

Betel nut chewing was described as being a "universal" practice among older people in the early 1900s. The most common configuration of the quid combines areca nut with slaked lime (usually made from heating crushed sea-shells) and betel leaves (tambul or siri). Tobacco may or may not be added. In modern times, it has gone out of favor and has been replaced by cigarettes and chewing gum. The practice only survives among more remote ethnic groups like the Cordillerans of Luzon, and the Lumad and Moro people of Mindanao.

In Philippine English, this practice is known as momma. In the native languages of the Philippines, betel nut chewing is known variously as buyo, bunga, hitso, or ngangà in Tagalog, Bikol, and the Visayan languages; dapiau in Ivatan; and bua, mama or maman in Ilocano; luyos in Kapampangan; pasa in Basilan; and lugos in Zamboanga; among other names.

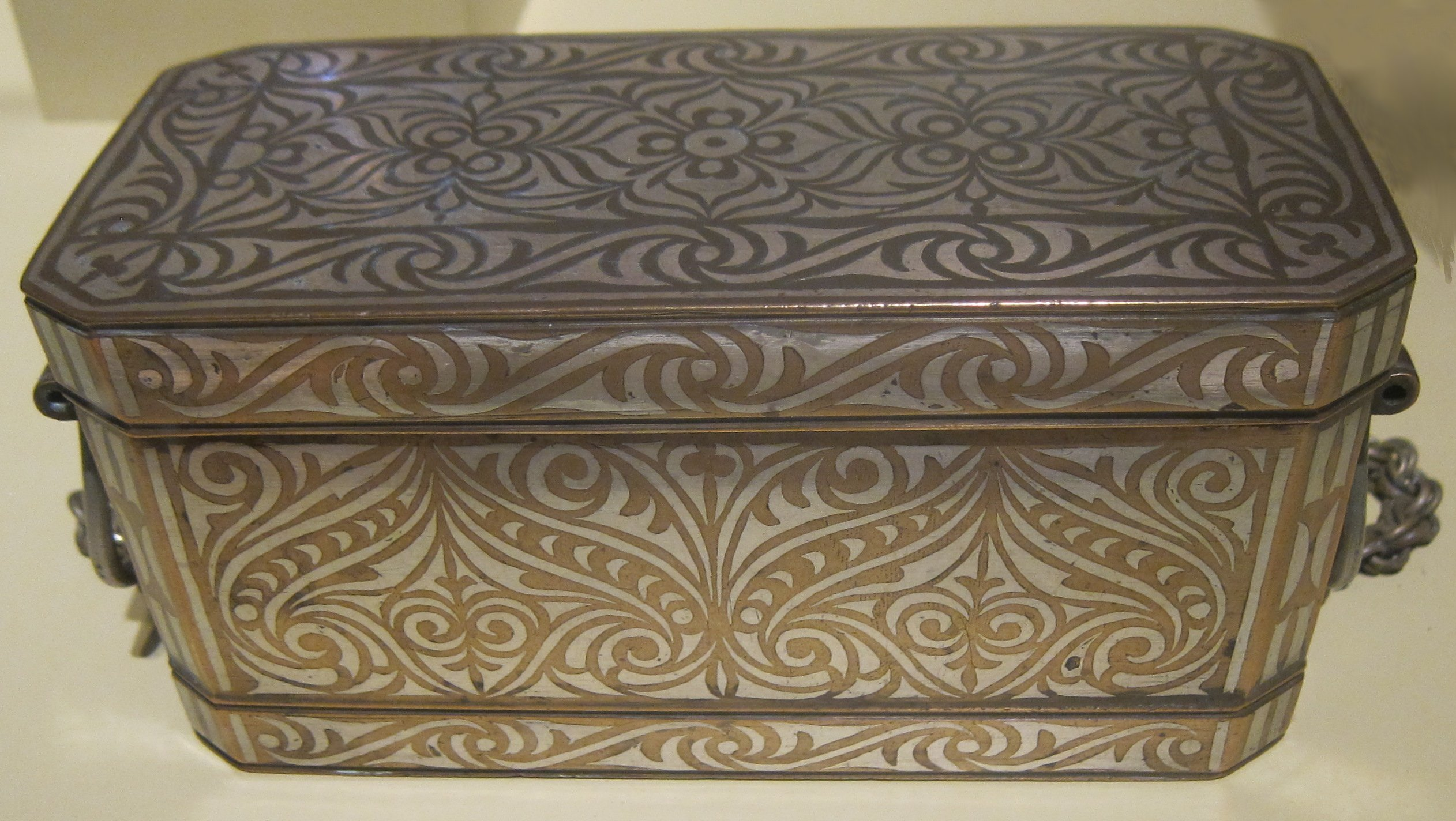
Betel box from the Maranao people of Mindanao, Philippines, probably 20th century, copper alloy with silver inlay, Honolulu Museum of Art

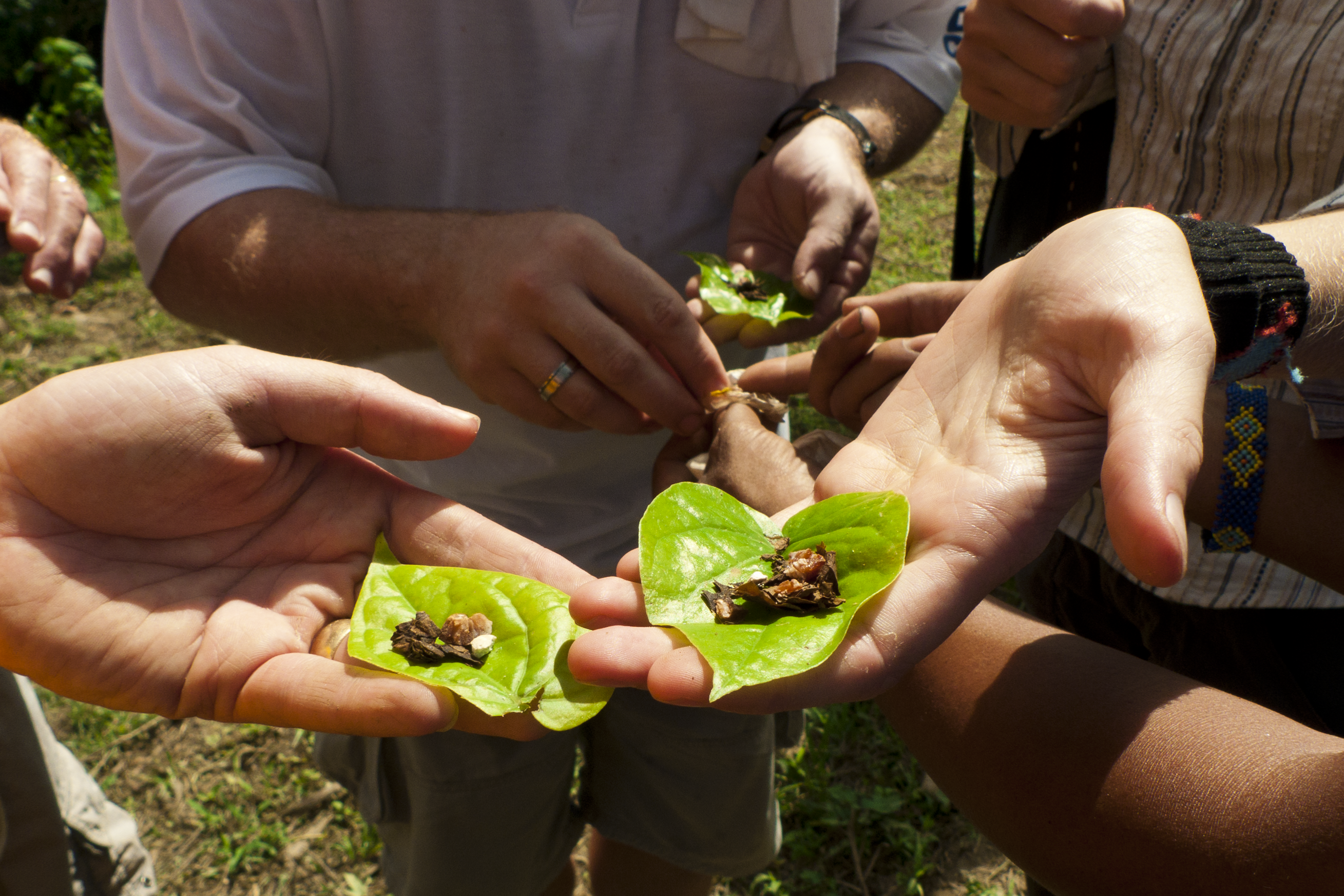
Betel quid preparations among the Iraya Mangyan of Mindoro, Philippines

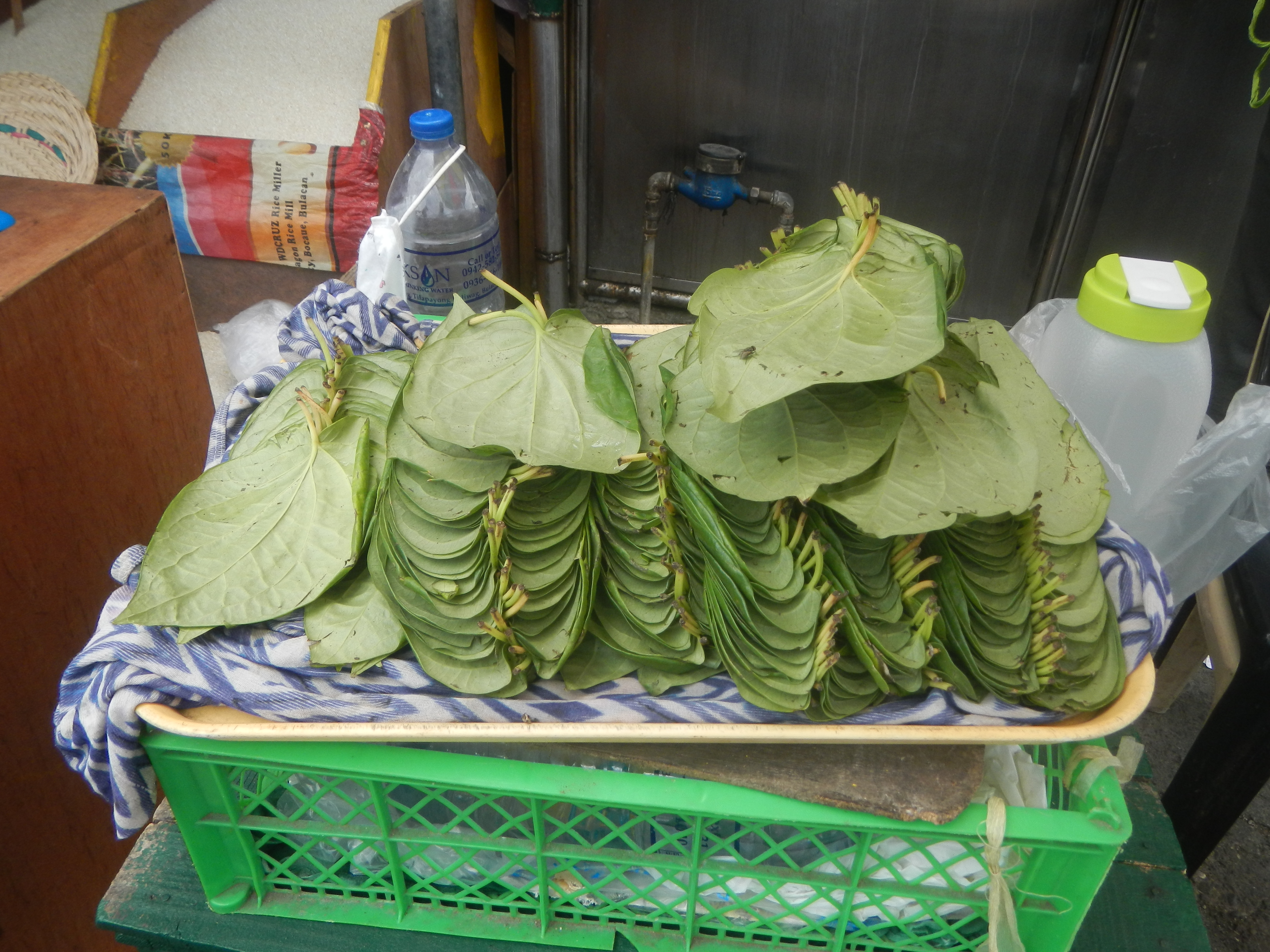
Betel leaves for sale in Baliuag, Bulacan

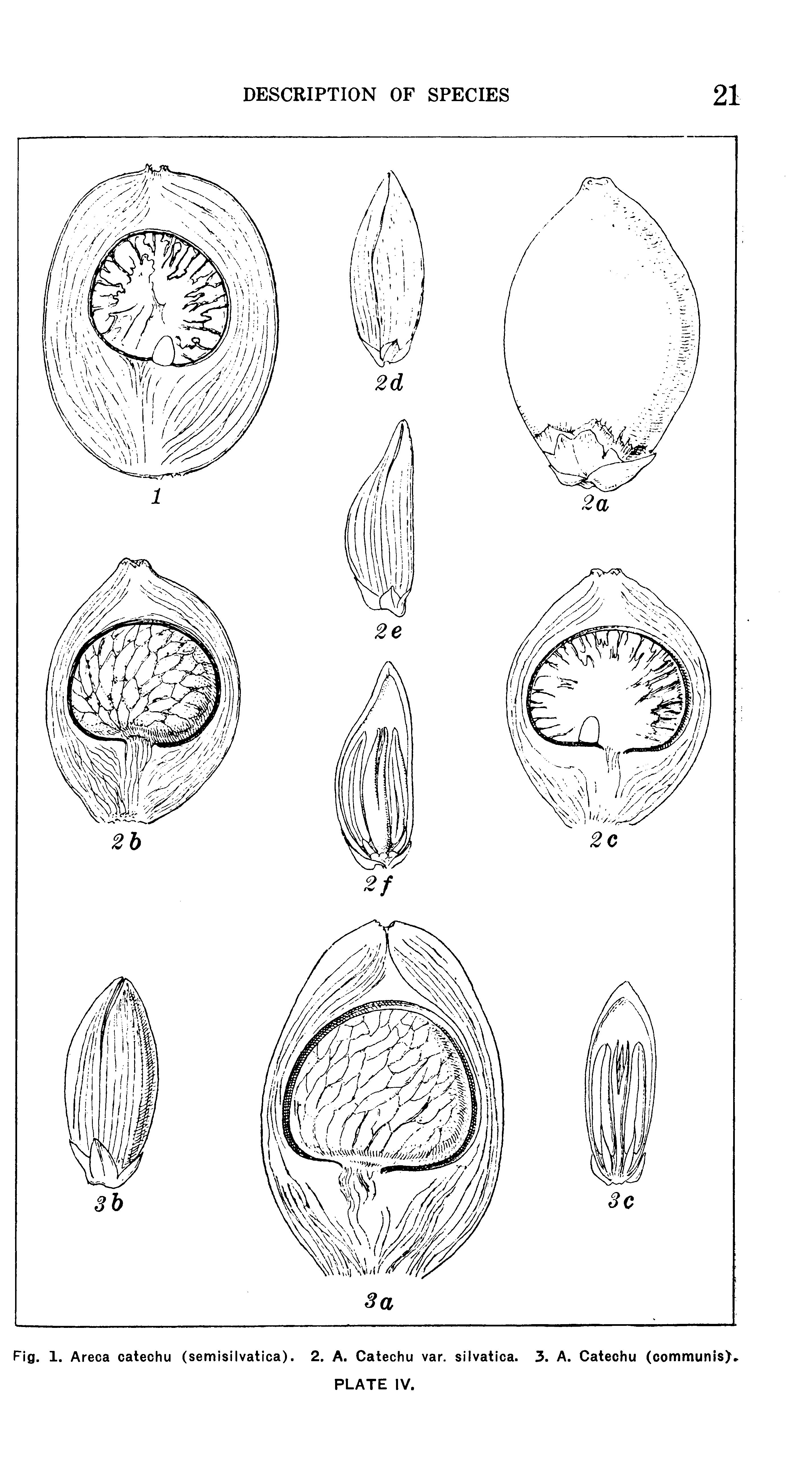
Illustration of three varieties of areca nuts once widely used in betel nut chewing in the Philippines, from Philippine Palms and Palm Products (1903)

=== Taiwan ===
In Taiwan betel quid is sold from roadside kiosks, often by the so-called betelnut beauties although these are becoming fewer and fewer (simplified Chinese: 槟榔西施; traditional Chinese: 檳榔西施; pinyin: bīnláng xīshī; Pe̍h-ōe-jī: pin-nn̂g se-si) – scantily clad girls selling a quid preparation of betel leaf, betel nuts, tobacco and lime. It is a controversial business, with critics questioning entrapment, exploitation, health, class and culture.

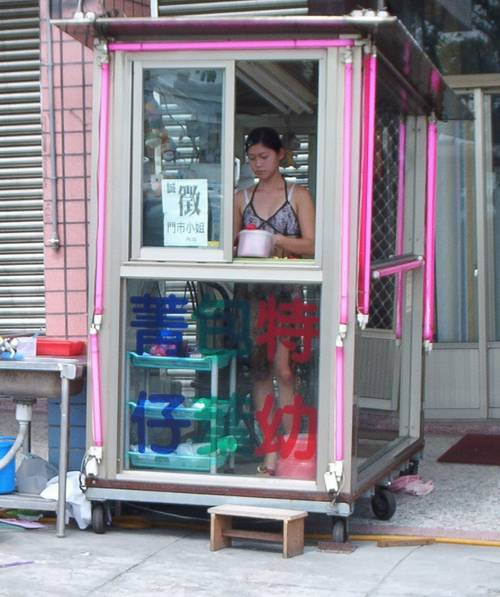
Betelnut Beauty kiosk in Taiwan

=== Vietnam ===
In Vietnam, the areca nut and the betel leaf are such important symbols of love and marriage that in Vietnamese the phrase "matters of betel and areca" (chuyện trầu cau) were historically synonymous with marriage. Areca nut chewing starts the talk between the groom's parents and the bride's parents about the young couple's marriage. Therefore, the leaves and juices are used ceremonially in Vietnamese weddings.

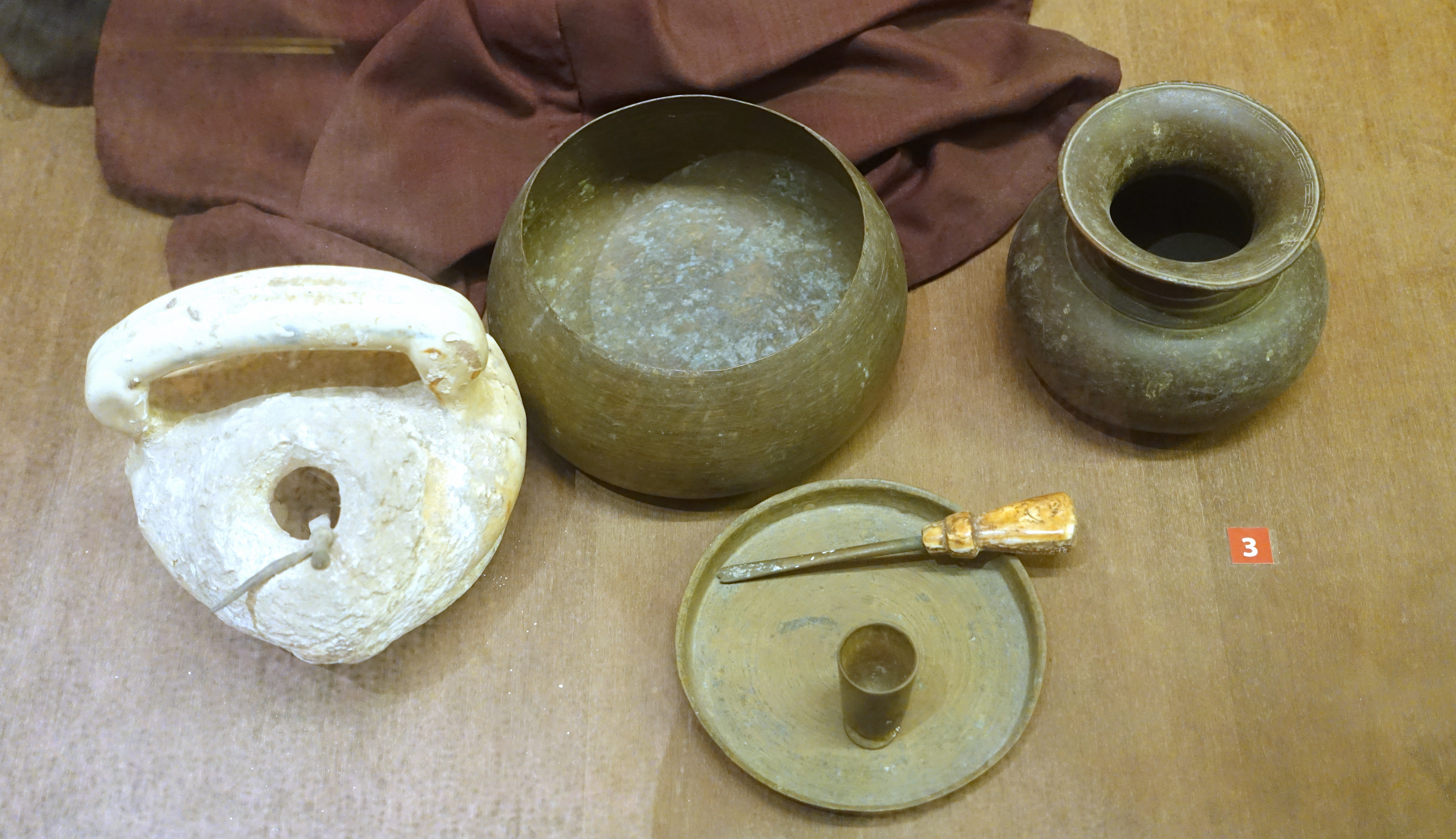
Vietnamese betel nut kit from the Vietnam Museum of Ethnology

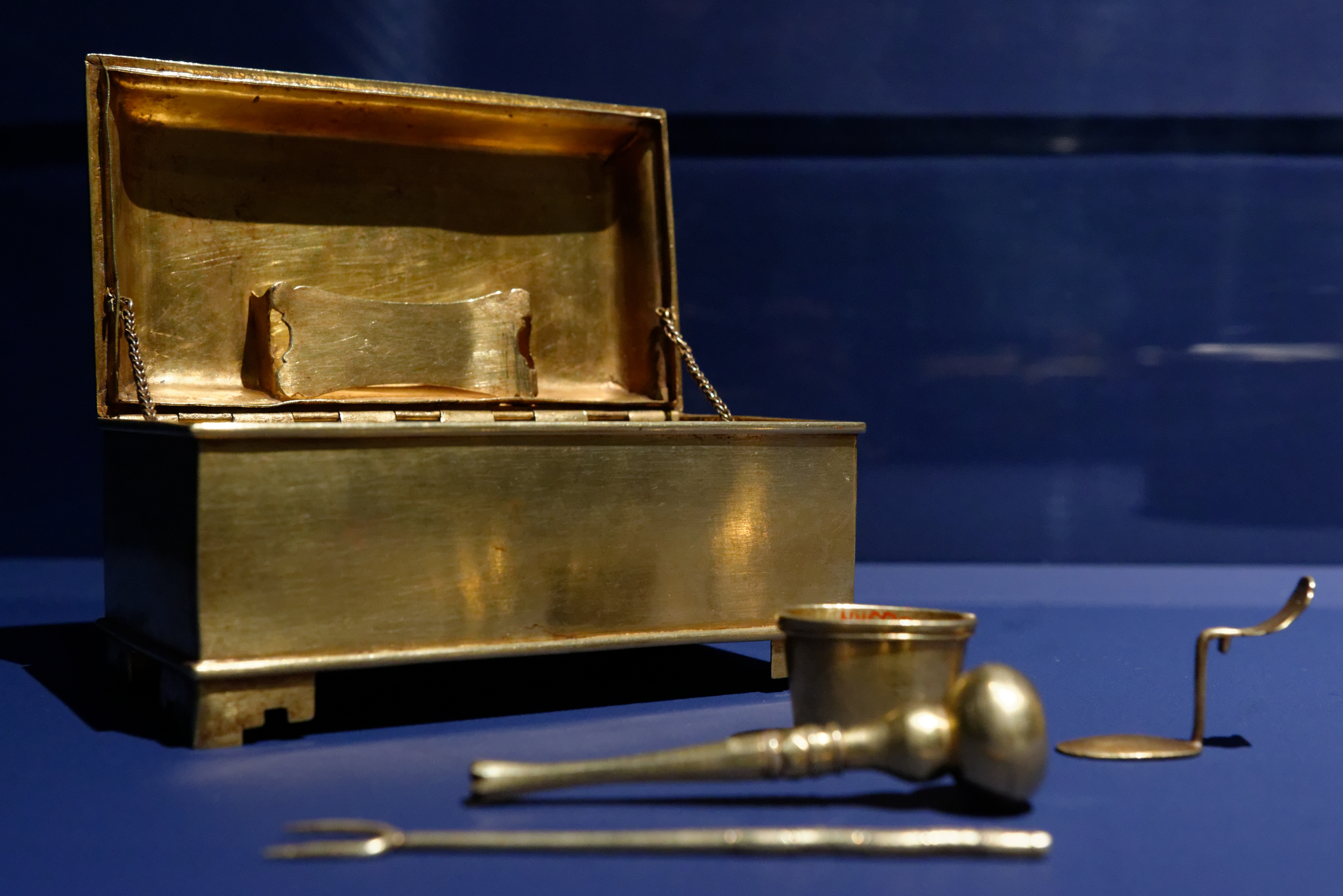
Betel service kit from the Imperial court of the Nguyễn dynasty (c. 19th century)

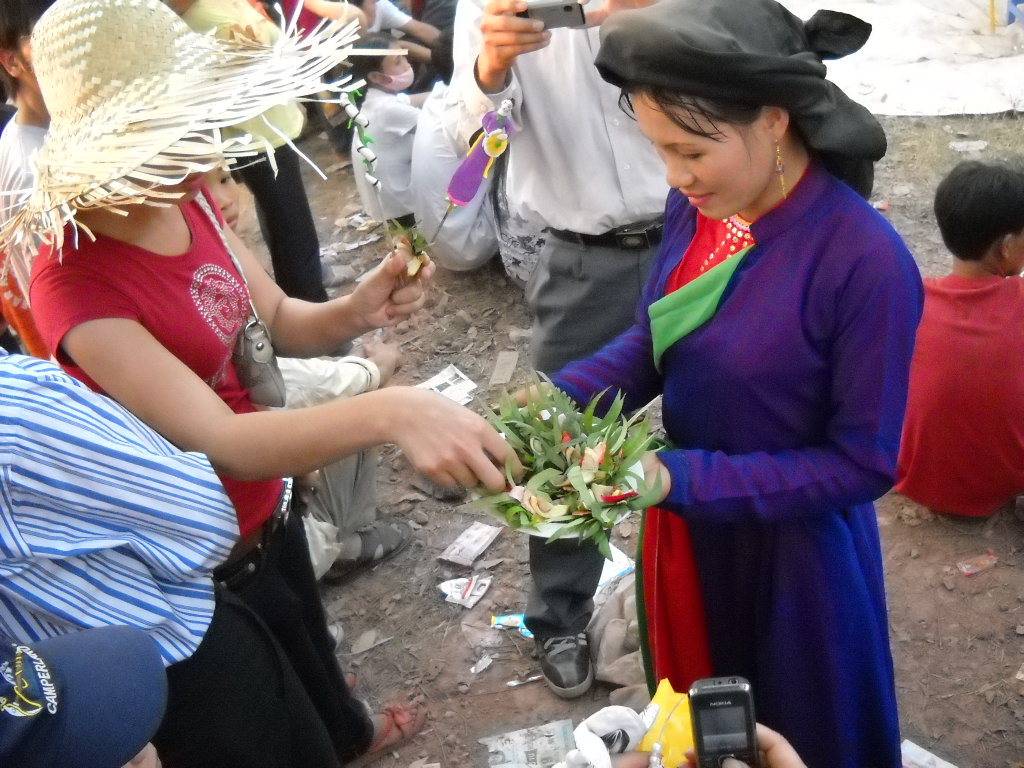
Betel quid vendor

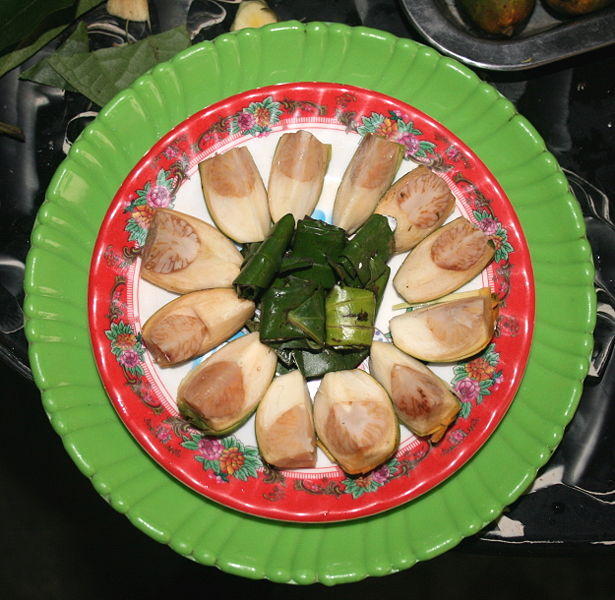
A plate of betel nut

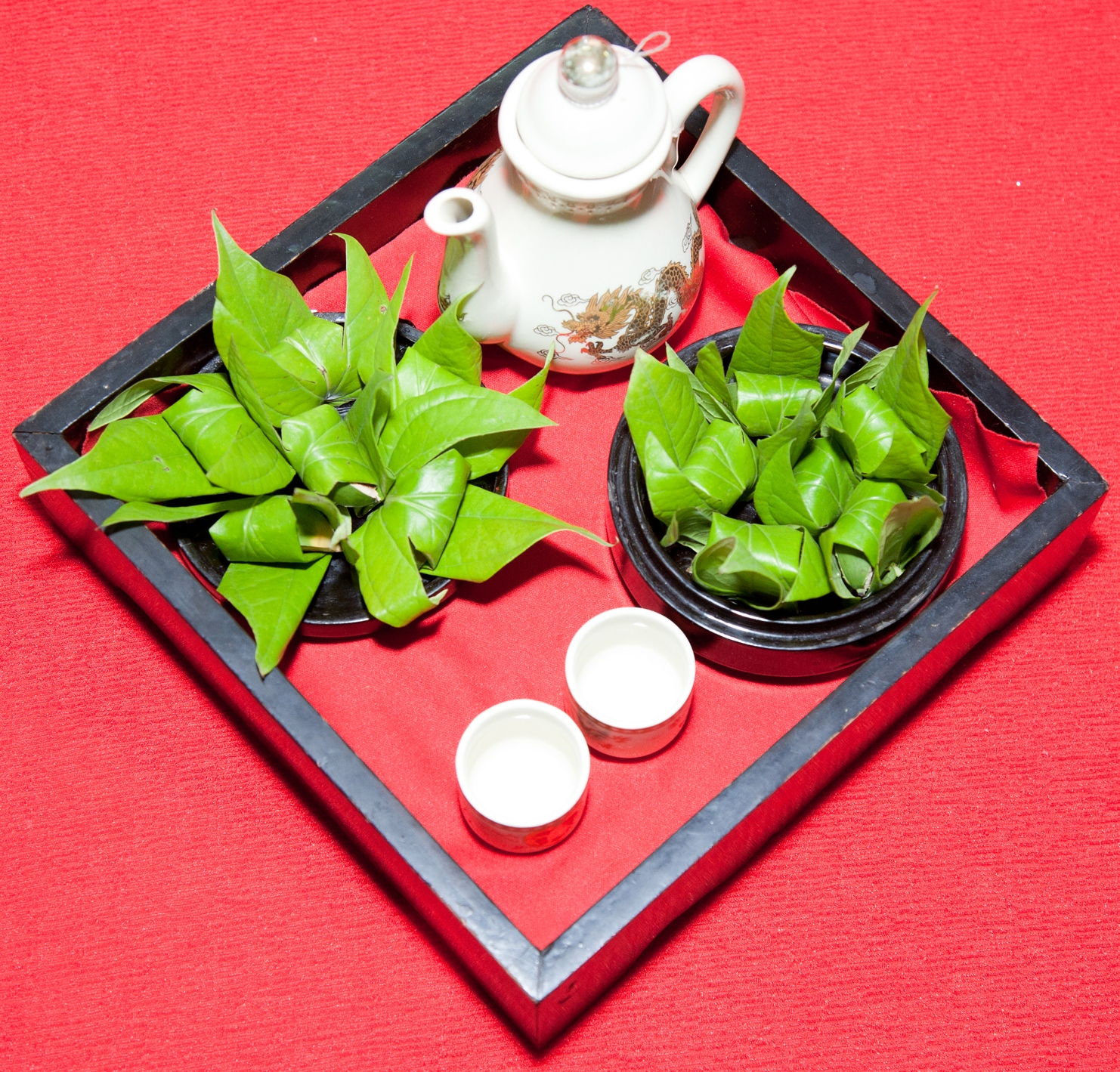
A plate of betel nut in a Vietnamese wedding

== Health effects ==
Health effects of chewing paan: gum damage, tooth decay and an increased risk of oral cancer

Chewing betel quids and areca nut causes multiple forms of cancer and cardiovascular disease, with or without tobacco.

Betel nut chewing causes an increased risk of head and neck cancers and esophageal cancer. Betel quid affects almost all parts of the human body, including the brain, heart, lungs, gastrointestinal tract and reproductive organs. It can cause myocardial infarction, cardiac arrhythmias, liver damage, asthma, type II diabetes, hyperlipidemia, metabolic syndrome, hypothyroidism, prostate hyperplasia and infertility.

When chewed with additional tobacco in its preparation (like in gutka), there is an even higher risk for cancer, especially for oral and oropharyngeal cancers. With tobacco it also raises the risk of fatal coronary artery disease, fatal stroke and non-fatal ischaemic heart disease

Women who chew areca nut formulations, such as paan, during pregnancy significantly increase adverse outcomes for the baby. Betel quid chewing can cause stillbirth, premature birth, and low birth weight.

It is estimated that around 600 million people worldwide regularly use this drug preparation. Attempts by the World Health Organization to control betel nut chewing remain problematic, as the custom is deeply rooted in many cultures, including possessing religious connotations in some parts of Southeast Asia and India. Despite being associated with adverse health outcomes, this practice is not included in the list of risk factors examined by the Global Burden of Diseases, Injuries, and Risk Factors (GBD).

A recent study introduced the betel year, a novel metric designed to quantify lifetime exposure to betel quid chewing and enhance oral cancer risk prediction through personalized assessment. This tool helps identify high-risk individuals and supports targeted public health initiatives, including awareness campaigns and early detection programs. It may also inform policy development and ongoing epidemiological research. As an initial pilot effort, the betel year is a starting point, with further studies needed to explore the carcinogenic potential of other additives globally and refine the metric for wider use.

== History ==
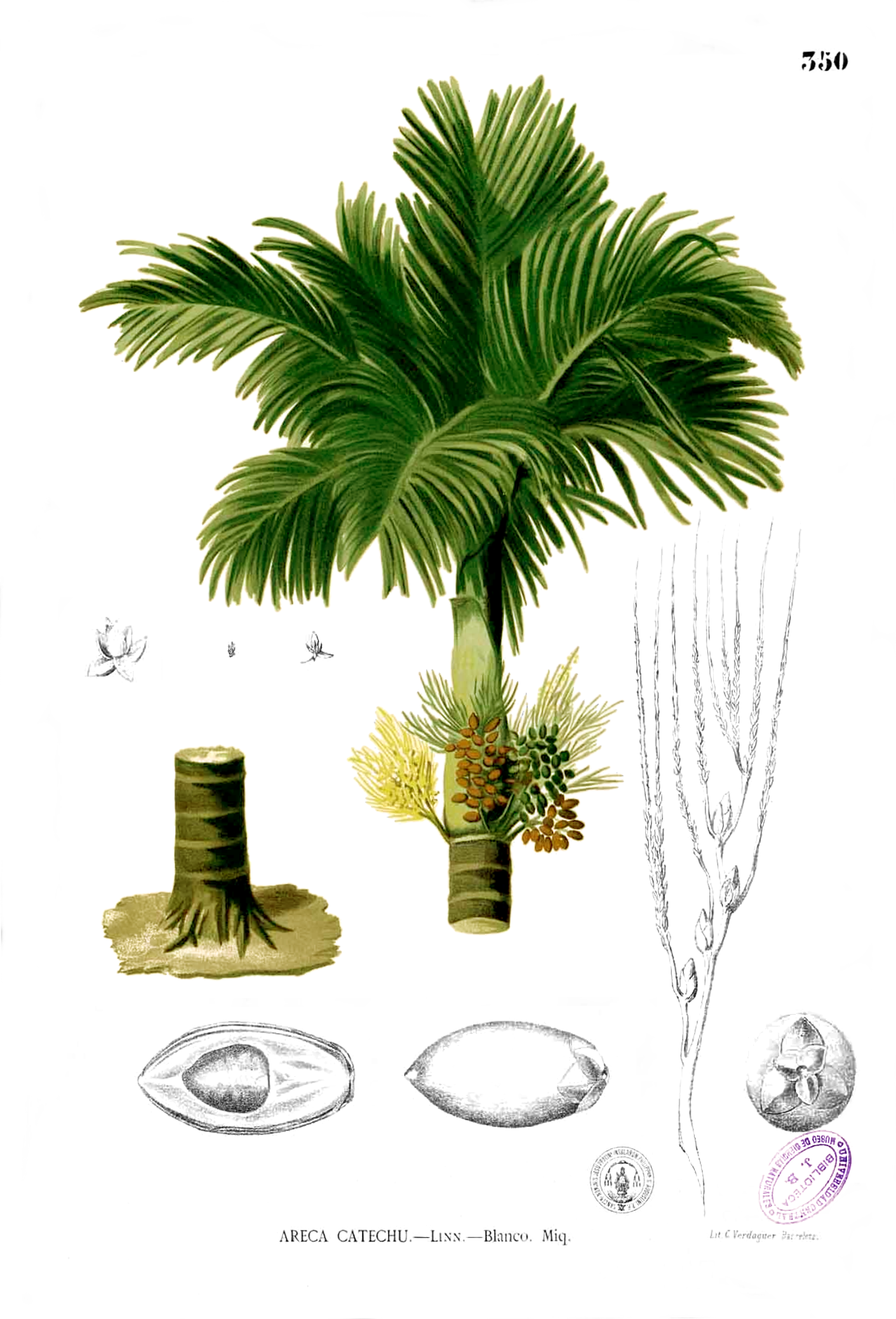
Areca catechu illustrated by Francisco Manuel Blanco in Flora de Filipinas (1880–1883). It is native to the Philippines.

Based on archaeological, linguistic, and botanical evidence, betel chewing is most strongly associated with the Austronesian peoples. Chewing betel generally requires the combination of areca nut (Areca catechu) and betel leaf (Piper betle). Both plants are native from the region between Island Southeast Asia to Australasia. A. catechu is believed to be native to the Philippines, where it has the greatest morphological diversity as well as the most closely related endemic species. The origin of the domestication of Piper betle, however, is unknown, although it is also native to the Philippines, the Lesser Sunda Islands, and Indochina. It is also unknown when or why the two plant products were combined, as areca nut alone can be chewed as a stimulant. In eastern Indonesia, leaves from other Piper species are sometimes used in place of betel leaves.

The oldest unequivocal evidence of betel chewing is from the Philippines. Specifically that of several individuals found in a burial pit in the Duyong Cave site of Palawan island dated to around 4,630±250 BP. The dentition of the skeletons is stained, typical of betel chewers. The grave also includes Anadara shells used as containers of lime, one of which still contained lime. Burial sites in Bohol dated to the first millennium CE also show the distinctive reddish stains characteristic of betel chewing. Based on linguistic evidence of how the reconstructed Proto-Austronesian term *buaq, meaning "fruit", came to refer to the "areca nut" in Proto-Malayo-Polynesian, it is believed that betel chewing originally developed somewhere within the Philippines shortly after the beginning of the Austronesian expansion (~5,000 BP). From the Philippines, it spread back to Taiwan, as well as onwards to the rest of Austronesia.

There are very old claims of betel chewing dating to at least 13,000 BP at the Kuk Swamp site in New Guinea, based on probable Areca sp. recovered. However, it is now known that these might have been due to modern contamination of sample materials. Similar claims have also been made at other older sites with Areca sp. remains, but none can be conclusively identified as A. catechu and their association with betel peppers is tenuous or nonexistent.

Evidence for use of the nut alone exists from Sulawesi. A 2026 study reported two pre-agricultural foragers from the island's southwestern peninsula: a partial upper jaw from the cave of Leang Bulu Bettue in the Maros-Pangkep karst, dated by uranium-series methods to between 25,000 and 16,000 BP, and a more complete skeleton of an adult male from Leang Cappalombo 1, associated with the Toalean culture and radiocarbon-dated to between 7,600 and 6,300 BP. Both had deep, rounded grooves worn around the molars and, in the second individual, the premolars, canines and an incisor, a pattern the researchers identified with the facets worn into the teeth of historical clay-pipe smokers which they attributed to years of clenching and sucking a hard round object 10 to 20 mm (0.39 to 0.79 in). This size matches the dehusked seed of Areca triandra, a small wild areca palm native to South Sulawesi. Mass spectrometry found arecoline in teeth from both individuals but not the red staining of the alkaloids guvacine and arecaidine, that form when the nut is chewed with slaked lime, ruling out quid chewing. However, their experiments found intact nuts soaked in saline release arecoline leading them to propose that habit was a relief for toothache with the chewing of the nut in a prepared quid arising later, after Austronesian farmers brought slaked lime, used as pottery temper, to Sulawesi around 4,000 BP.

A map showing the migration and expansion of the Austronesians (5,500 to 800 BP), which roughly corresponds to the prehistoric distribution of betel chewing

It reached Micronesia at around 3,500 to 3,000 BP with the Austronesian voyagers, based on both linguistic and archaeological evidence. It was also previously present in the Lapita culture, based on archaeological remains from Mussau dated to around 3,600 to 2,500 BP. But it did not reach Polynesia further east. It is believed that it stopped in the Solomon Islands due to the replacement of betel chewing with the tradition of kava drinking prepared from the related Piper methysticum. It was also diffused into East Africa via the Austronesian settlement of Madagascar and the Comoros by around the 7th century.

The practice also diffused to the cultures the Austronesians had historical contact with. It reached the Dong Son culture via the Austronesian Sa Huỳnh culture of Vietnam at around 3,000 to 2,500 BP through trade contacts with Borneo. It is from this period that skeletons with characteristic red-stained teeth start to appear in Mainland Southeast Asia. It is assumed that it reached South China and Hainan at around the same time, though no archaeological evidence for this can be found as of yet. In Cambodia, the earliest evidence of betel nut chewing is from around 2,400 to 2,200 BP. It also spread to Thailand at 1,500 BP, based on archaeobotanical evidence.

In the Indian subcontinent, betel chewing was introduced through early contact of Austronesian traders from Sumatra, Java, and the Malay Peninsula with the Dravidian-speakers of Sri Lanka and southern India at around 3,500 BP. This also coincides with the introduction of Southeast Asian plants like Santalum album and Cocos nucifera, as well as the adoption of the Austronesian outrigger ship and crab-claw sail technologies by Dravidian-speakers. Unequivocal literary references to betel only start appearing after the Vedic period, in works like Dipavaṃsa (c. 3rd century CE) and Mahāvaṃsa (c. 5th century). Betel chewing only reached northern India and Kashmir after 500 CE through trade with Mon-Khmer-speaking peoples in the Bay of Bengal. From there it followed the Silk Road to Persia and into the Mediterranean.

Chinese records, specifically Linyi Ji by Dongfang Shuo associate the growing of areca palms with the first settlers of the Austronesian Champa polities in southern Vietnam at around 2,100 to 1,900 BP. This association is echoed in Nanfang Cao Mu Zhuang by Ji Han (c. 304 CE) who also describes its importance in Champa culture, specifically in the way Cham hosts traditionally offer it to guests. Betel chewing entered China through trade with Champa, borrowing the Proto-Malayo-Chamic name *pinaŋ resulting in Chinese bin lang for "areca nut", with the meaning of "honored guest", reflecting Chamic traditions. The same for the alternate term bin men yao jian, literally meaning "guest [at the door] medicinal sweetmeat".

== See also ==
- Domesticated plants and animals of Austronesia
- Betel container (Victoria & Albert Museum)
- Betel chewing in Thailand
- Betel chewing in China
