= Betel container (Victoria & Albert Museum) =

19th-century Burmese gold container

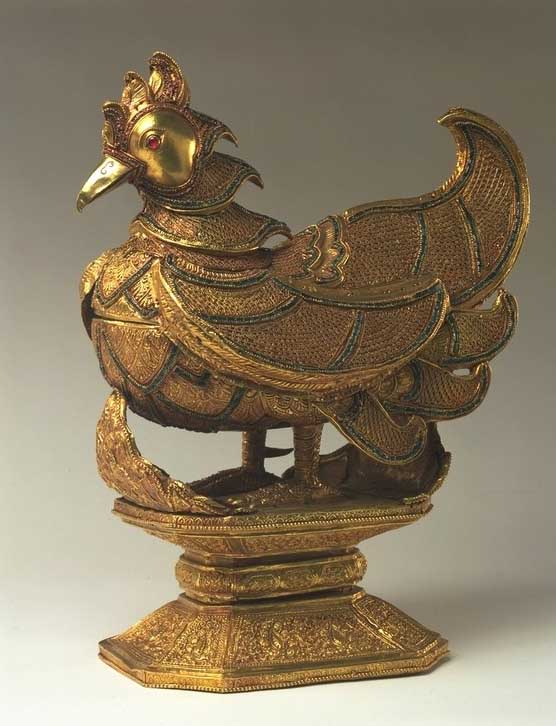
Betel container, 19th century V&A Museum no. IS.246&A-1964

The betel container or betel box (Burmese: ကွမ်းအစ်) in the Victoria and Albert Museum in London is a gold and jewelled container in the shape of a bird. It was made in Burma (now Myanmar) in the nineteenth century.

It was made of embossed gold and filigree work set with rubies and emeralds and was designed to hold betel, a mild stimulant chewed throughout tropical Asia. Betel is traditionally made from areca nuts and lime wrapped in a betel leaf. The container is in the form of a mythical bird known as a karaweik. This has been an important motif in Burmese art since the seventh century, and was believed to possess the ideal qualities of purity and gentleness. It is chicken-like in its appearance with its feet, curled wings, pointed beak, wealth of overlapping body feathers, curled wings and upturned tail. The waisted stand is decorated with panels of floral ornament and at each end a leaf-shaped extension with foliage motifs, curved upwards to support the body of the stand.

Although containers in this form are common enough in Myanmar, this particular object is of great historical significance since it formed part of the Burmese regalia used by the last king, Thibaw Min. The regalia were requisitioned by the British as indemnity at the end of the Third Burmese War in 1885 and remained under the custodianship of the Victoria and Albert Museum from 1886 until 1964, when they were returned to Myanmar. This container was given to the Museum by the Government and people of Myanmar in recognition of its care of the regalia.

== Bibliography ==
- Jackson, Anna, ed. (2001). V&A: A Hundred Highlights. V&A Publications.
