= Tepak sireh =

Malay metal container for betel leaves

Tepak sireh is a traditional Malay ceremonial betel nut container, integral to various cultural practices in Malaysia, Indonesia, and Brunei.

== Description ==
The most common tepak sireh is rectangular, roughly 12 inches long, 7 inches wide at the base, and 6 inches high. The boxes have a removable metal tray, and betel leaves can be stored underneath. In addition to the tray, there are small containers that store slices of areca nut, lime paste, gambier, and shredded tobacco.

== Symbolism ==
According to a study by Universitas Islam Sumatra Utara, there are seven symbolisms of the tepak sireh.

- Arceca nut: Good offspring of good character
- Lime: Kindness and sincerity
- Gambier: Self determination
- Tobacco: Steadfast heart and readiness to sacrifice
- Cloves: The ability to maintain a reputation
- Kacip: Mutual agreement to make good decision
