= Banganapalle (mango) =

Mango cultivar

Banganapalli
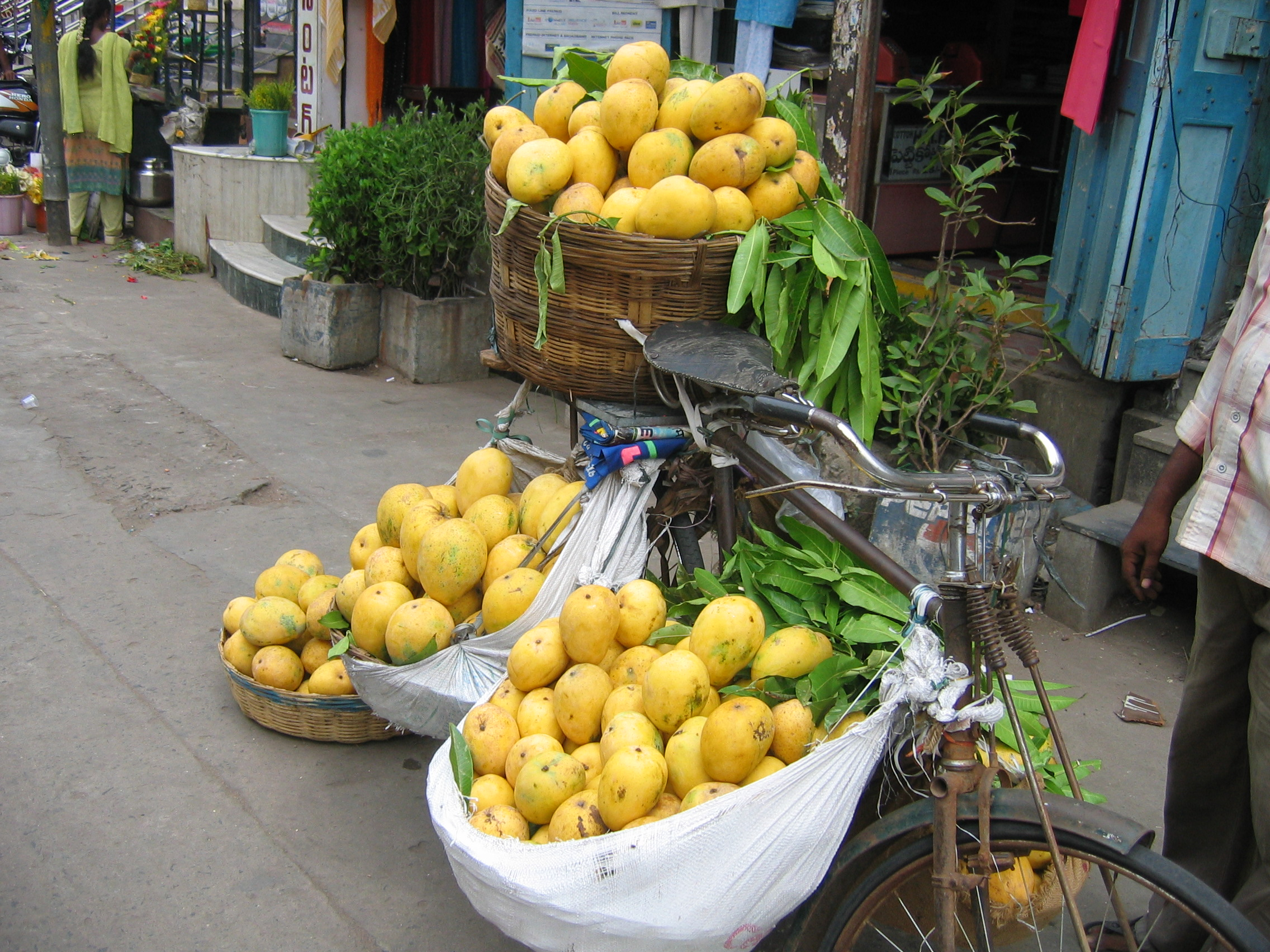
- Banganpalle mangoes being sold on a bicycle in Guntur City, Andhra Pradesh, India
- Species: Mangifera indica
- Cultivar: 'Banganapalli'
- Origin: Banganapalle, Andhra Pradesh, India

Banganapalle mangoes
- Geographical indication
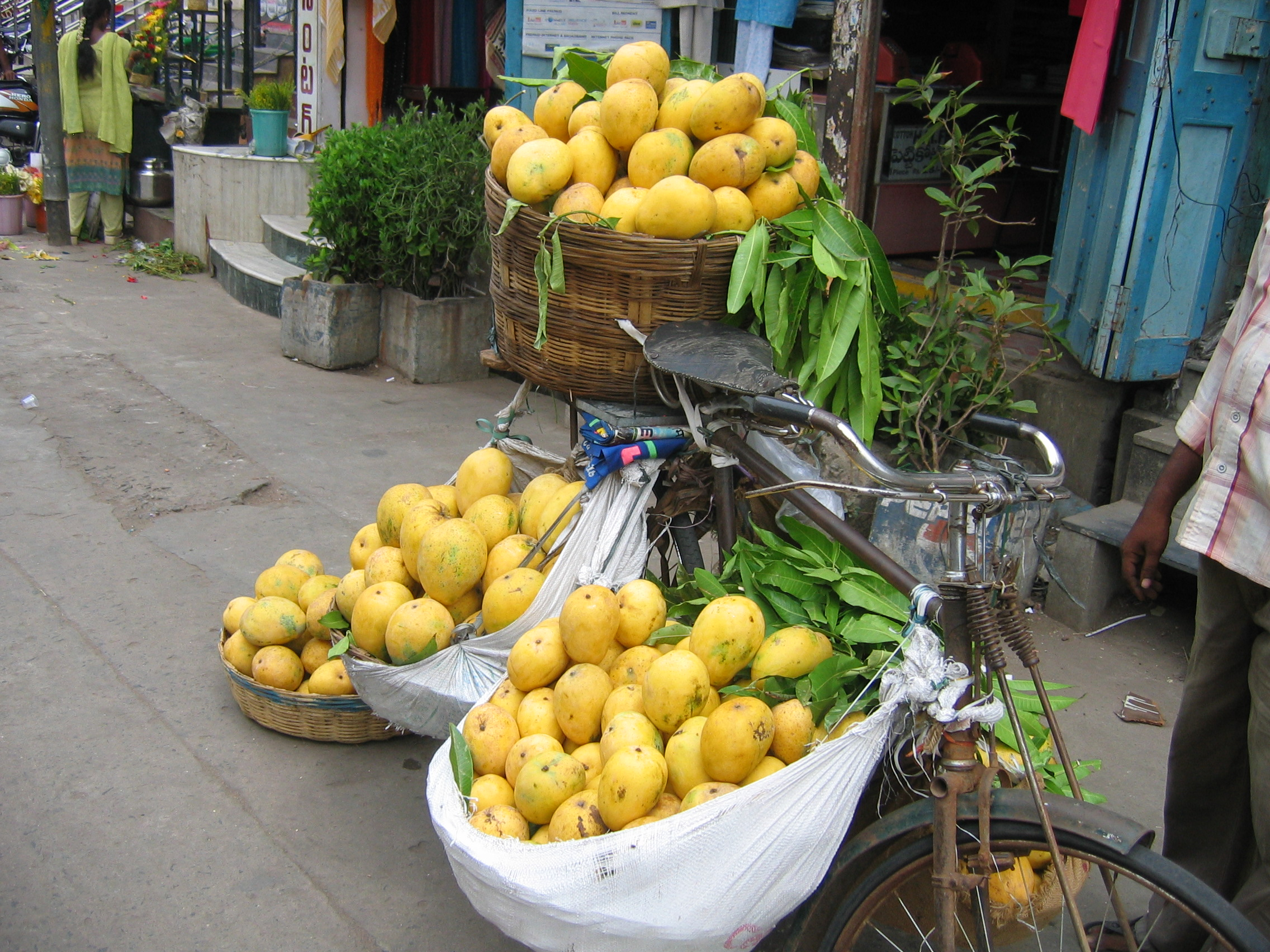
- Banaganapalle Mango sold on a Bicycle in Guntur
- Description: A Mango variety found in Kurnool district of Andhra Pradesh
- Type: Agricultural
- Area: Kurnool district, Andhra Pradesh
- Country: India
- Material: Agricultural: Fruit

Banganapalle mangoes (also known as Benishan and Bernisha) is a mango variety produced in Banganapalle of Nandyal District in the Indian state of Andhra Pradesh and state fruit of Andhra. It alone occupies 70% percent of total mango cultivable area of the state and was first introduced by the farmers of Banaganapalli. It was registered as one of the geographical indication from Andhra Pradesh on 3 May 2017, under horticultural products by Geographical Indication Registry. It is also grown in the other parts of India and Pakistan. The fruit is described as obliquely oval in shape, around 20cm in length, with yellow flesh and a thin, smooth yellow skin. The flesh is of a firm, meaty texture and is sweet and lacks fibre. The cultivar is the most sought after in Andhra Pradesh. It is a very late-season variety that is good for canning. This cultivar is a source of vitamin A & C and is also called king of Mangoes.

== Etymology ==
It is also known as Banganapalli as it is cultivated plenty in and around Banaganapalle village of Andhra Pradesh. Benishan, Chappatai, Safeda (Delhi, UP and other northern states), Badam Aam (Rajasthan, MP, Malwa, Mewar and other areas of Central India) are some other names.

== Cultivation ==
It is mainly cultivated in the mandals of Banaganapalle, Panyam and Nandyal of Kurnool district. Also Banginapalli from Ulavapadu village is very popular due to its enhanced flavour and size. Apart from these, Coastal and Rayalaseema areas cultivate it too. The state of Telangana also has its cultivation in some districts of Khammam, Mahabubnagar, Rangareddy, Medak and Adilabad districts of Telangana.

== See also ==
- Kamalapur Red Banana
- Bangalore Blue
- Nanjanagud banana
- Coorg orange
