= Monsooned Malabar =

Coffee beans processing

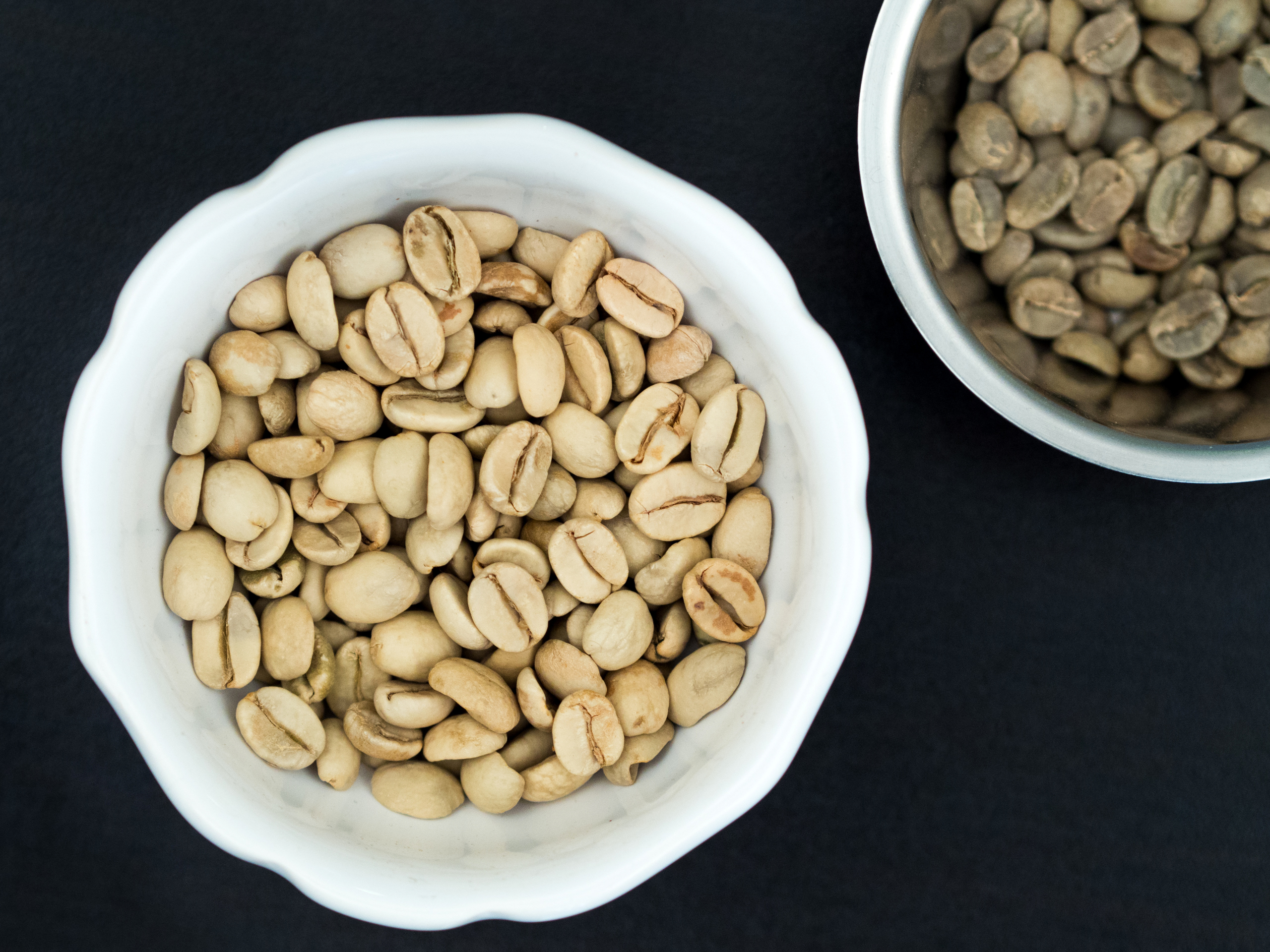
Monsoon Malabar arabica, compared with green Yirgachefe beans from Ethiopia

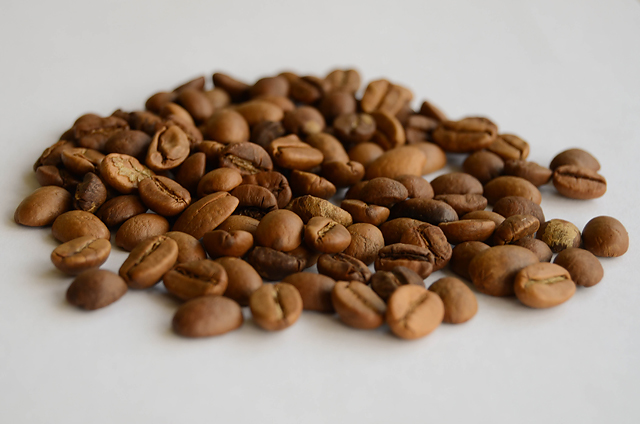
Monsooned Malabar beans

Monsooned Malabar, also known as Monsoon Malabar, is a process applied to coffee beans. The harvested coffee seeds are exposed to the monsoon rain and winds for a period of about three to four months, causing the beans to swell and lose the original acidity, resulting in a flavor profile with a practically neutral pH balance. The coffee is unique to the Malabar Coast of Karnataka, Kerala and the Nilgri mountains of Tamil Nadu and has protected status under India's Geographical Indications of Goods Act. The name Monsoon Malabar is derived from exposure to the monsoon winds of the Malabar coast.

Monsoon Malabar coffee is usually roasted very dark, well into second crack, with the beans coated in oils. The brew is heavy bodied, pungent, and considered to be dry with a chocolatey aroma and notes of spice and nuts.

== History ==
The origins of Monsoon Malabar date back to the times of the British Raj, when, during the months that the beans were transported by sea from India to Europe, the humidity and the sea winds combined to cause the coffee to absorb the moisture and change from the fresh green to a more aged pale yellow. In the past, when wooden vessels carried raw coffee from India to Europe, during the monsoon months taking almost six months to sail around the Cape of Good Hope, the coffee beans, exposed to constant humid conditions, underwent characteristic changes. The beans changed in size, texture, and appearance, both as beans and in the cup. Modern transportation reduced the length of this journey and better protected the beans from weathering and humidity. However, the coffee beans now arriving in European ports lacked the depth and character of the coffee beans previously received.

In the past, the coffee beans had been changed by exposure to the sea air and monsoon winds and rain. An alternative process was implemented to replicate these conditions. A typical ambiance could be simulated along the coastal belt of southwest India during the monsoon months, bringing about the same characteristic change to the ordinary cherry coffee beans.

== Varietals ==
Different varietals of the coffee bean may be processed in this way, hence monsoon malabar arabica and monsoon malabar robusta.

== Monsooning process ==
Whole crops of cherry coffee are selected and sun-dried in expansive barbecues. The dried beans are cured and sorted into 'AA' and 'A' grades, after which they are stored in warehouses until the onset of monsoon. From June through September, the selected beans are exposed to moisture-laden monsoon winds in well-ventilated warehouses (12 to 16 weeks time). The monsooning process involves careful handling, repeated spreading, raking and turning around in regular intervals. The beans absorb moisture and get significantly larger, turning a pale golden colour. Further micro-sorting is done to separate fully monsooned beans.

== Brewing ==
Monsoon Malabar coffee is usually roasted very dark, well into second crack, with the beans coated in oils. The brew is heavy bodied, pungent, and considered to be dry with a chocolatey aroma and notes of spice and nuts.

== See also ==
- Byadagi chilli
- Udupi Mattu Gulla
- Nanjanagud banana
- Coorg orange

- Coffee production in India
