= Allahabadi Surkha =

Variety of guava cultivated in Uttar Pradesh

- Geographical indication
- Description: Fruits cultivated in Allahabad
- Area: Allahabad, Uttar Pradesh
- Country: India

Allahabadi Surkha are a variety of guava having deep pink color inside instead of the typical white color also known as Apple Guava and an apple red exterior skin. This fruit is sweet, and strongly flavoured with few seeds and is slightly depressed at both ends. The plants are vigorous, dome shaped and compact. These guavas are cultivated across the Allahabad, Uttar Pradesh region in the northern belt of India. Allahabadi Surkha is cultivated today on almost 1000 hectares of land mainly under Kaushambi and Kaurihar -II districts of Allahabad. The fruit is known for its medical properties such that during the winter season because it neutralizes disease symptoms.

== See also ==
- Bangalore Blue
- Coorg orange
- Nanjanagud banana
