= Matta rice =

Indigenous variety of rice grown in Palakkad district of Kerala, India

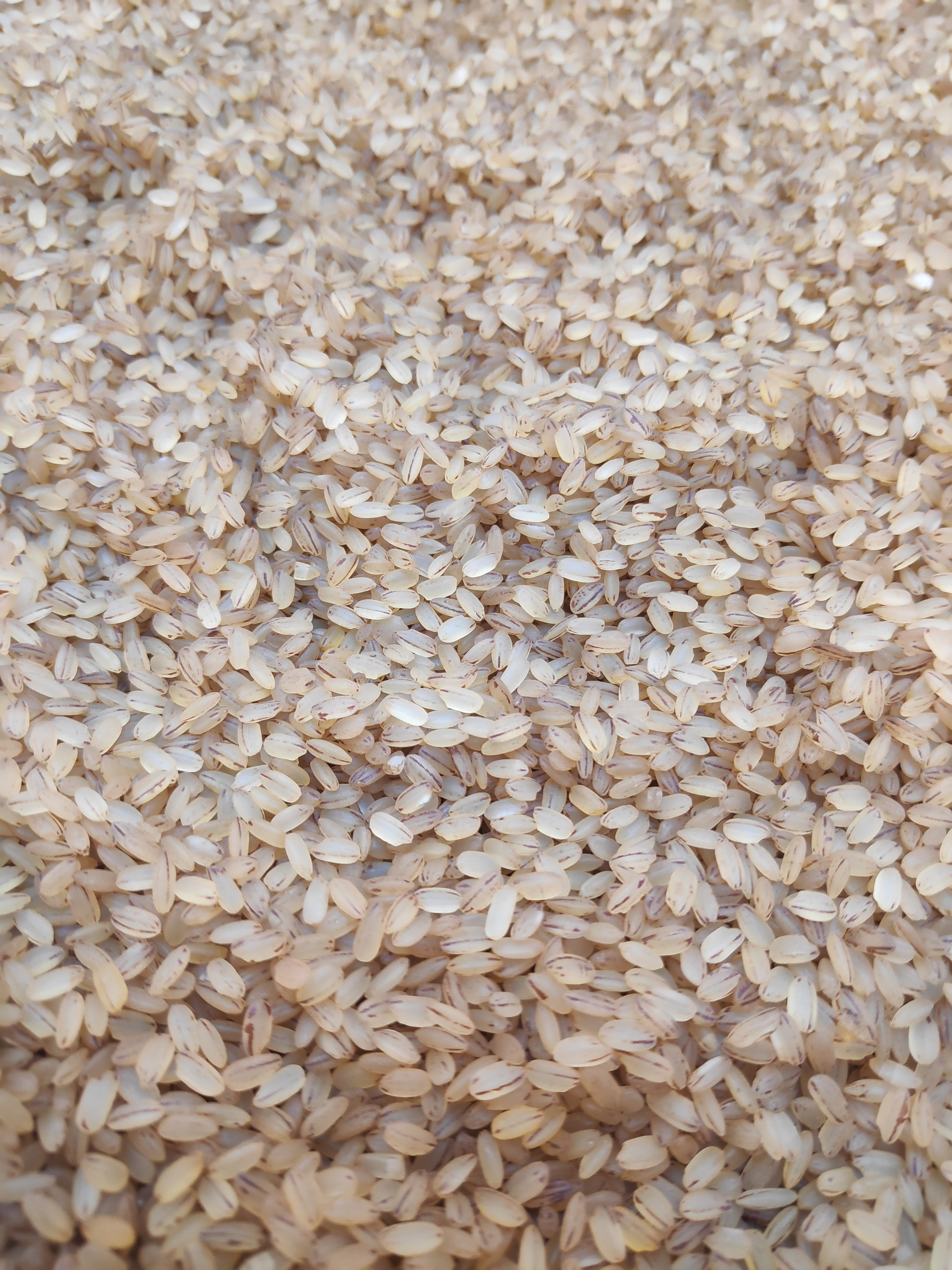
Matta Rice

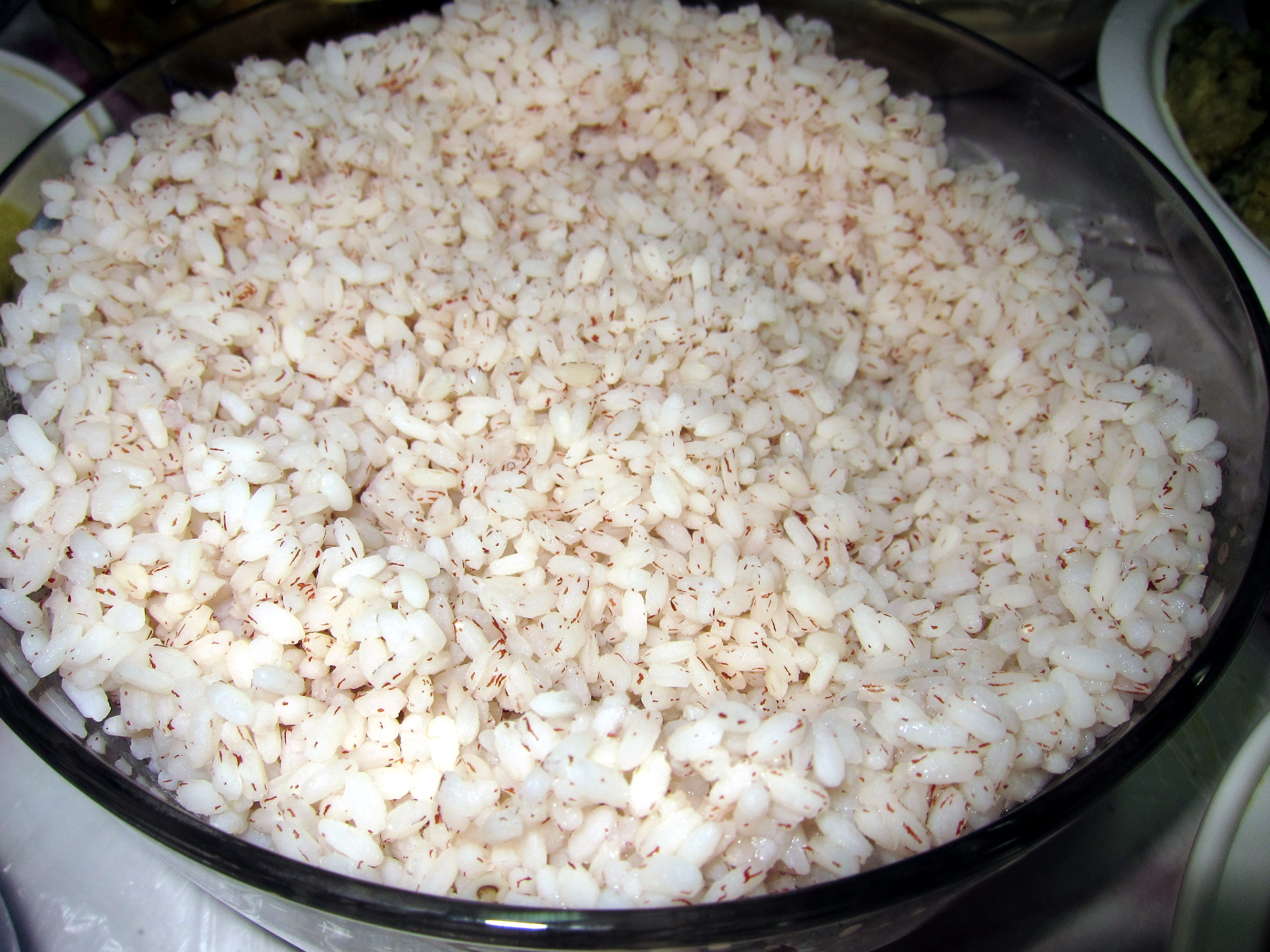
Matta rice (cooked)

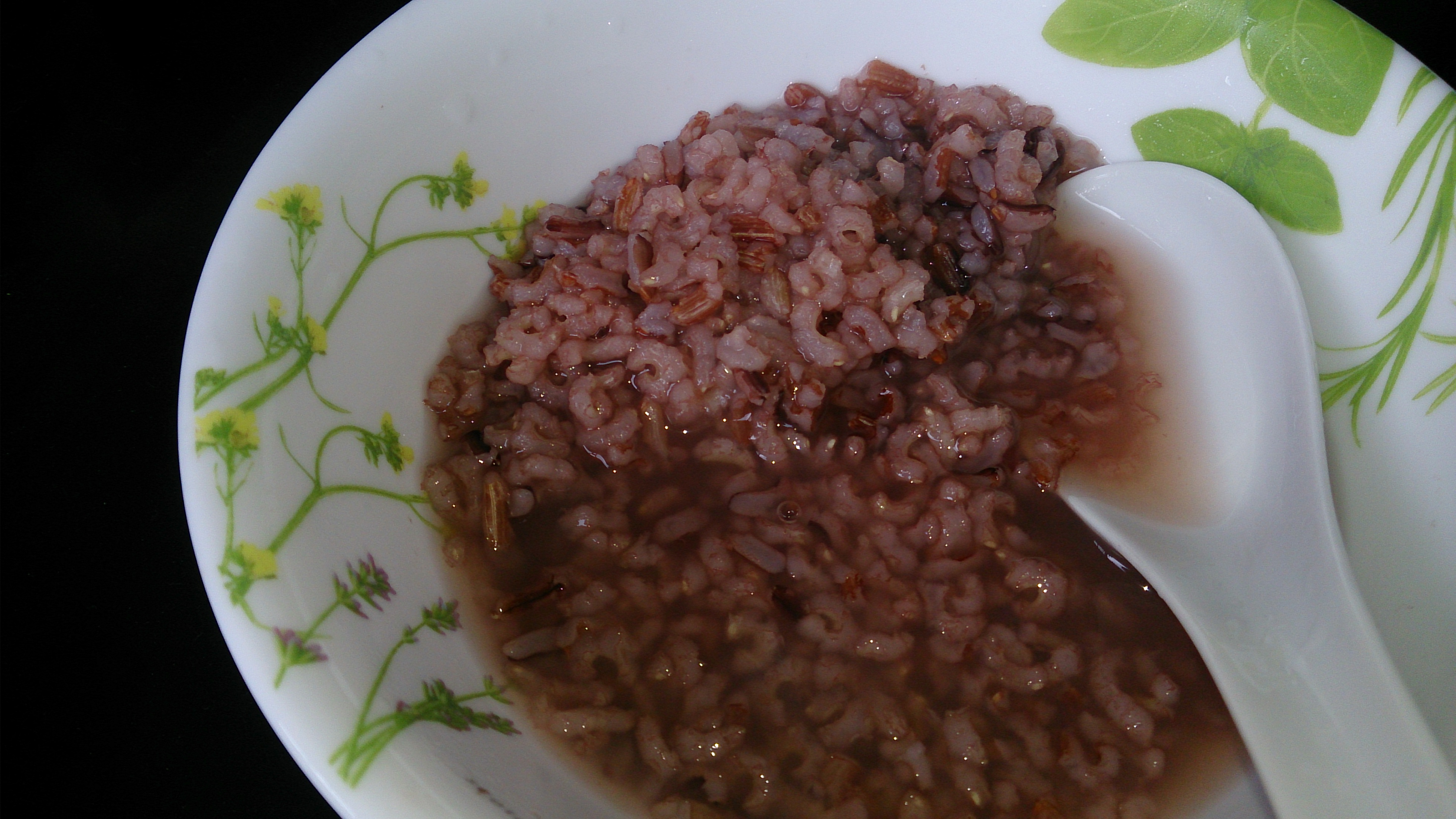
Red rice porridge

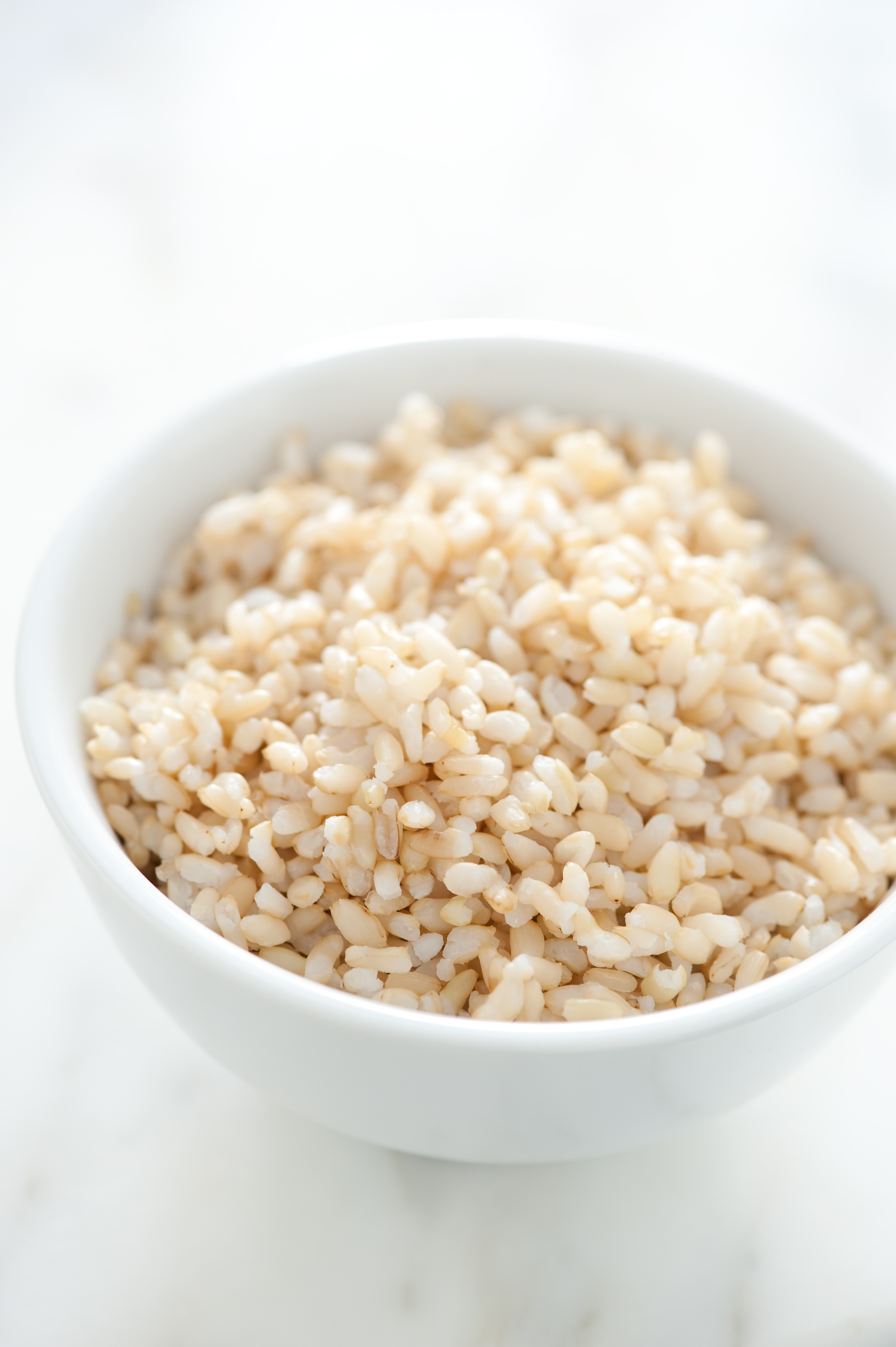
Parboiled rice

Matta rice (also known as Palakkadan/Kerala/Rose Matta rice, Kaje Rice in Karnataka, or Kuththarisi) (Malayalam: കേരള മട്ട, Tulu:കജെ അരി, Odia: ମୁଗେଇ ଚାଉଳ (Mugei Chaula), Kannada: ಕಜೆ, ಕುಚಲಕ್ಕಿ, Tamil: குத்தரிசி, lit. 'Kuttarici') is an indigenous variety of rice grown in Udupi and Dakshina Kannada districts of Karnataka, Palakkad district of Kerala,a traditional red parboiled rice variety from the Mayurbhanj and Balasore districts of Odisha, India and in Jaffna district of Northern Province, Sri Lanka. It is known for its coarseness and health benefits. It is popular in Kerala and coastal Karnataka in India and Sri Lanka where it is used on a regular basis for idlies, appams and plain rice.

== Origin ==
Palakkadan matta rice was the choice of the royal families of Chola and Chera dynasties of India.

Kerala matta rice has been historically popular due to its rich and unique taste. It is used in preparations of rice-snacks like Kondattam, Murukku etc. References to chunnila matta can be found in the work Rice in Kerala authored by Sri. P.C. Sahadevan and published by the Government of Kerala in 1966. The rice is mentioned in Tamil classics such as Thirukkural. Rice in the days of the Chera/Chola kingdoms was considered a royal food.

== Cultivation and trade ==
Kerala matta rice is grown in Kerala, Karnataka in southern India and in northern Sri Lanka. Matta rice gives Kerala farmers a premium of Indian Rs. 300 for 500 kg of paddy. A three-year ban on the export of matta rice was partially lifted in February 2011, allowing 25,000 tonnes to be exported in 2011.

Palakkadan matta rice is cultivated in the dense black cotton soil of Palakkad district in Kerala. The rice has a distinct earthly flavour because of the type of soil in which it is cultivated. These paddy fields are called 'poonthalpadam' and the soil contains a lot of clay and silt. Because of these qualities, this kind of paddy fields can retain more water.

== Characteristics ==
The grains are yellowish pink (from being parboiled) with reddish outer layers. Rose matta rice maintains its pink hue as well as its flavour on cooking. Like all brown or parboiled rice, red matta has a lengthy cooking time and requires extra water.

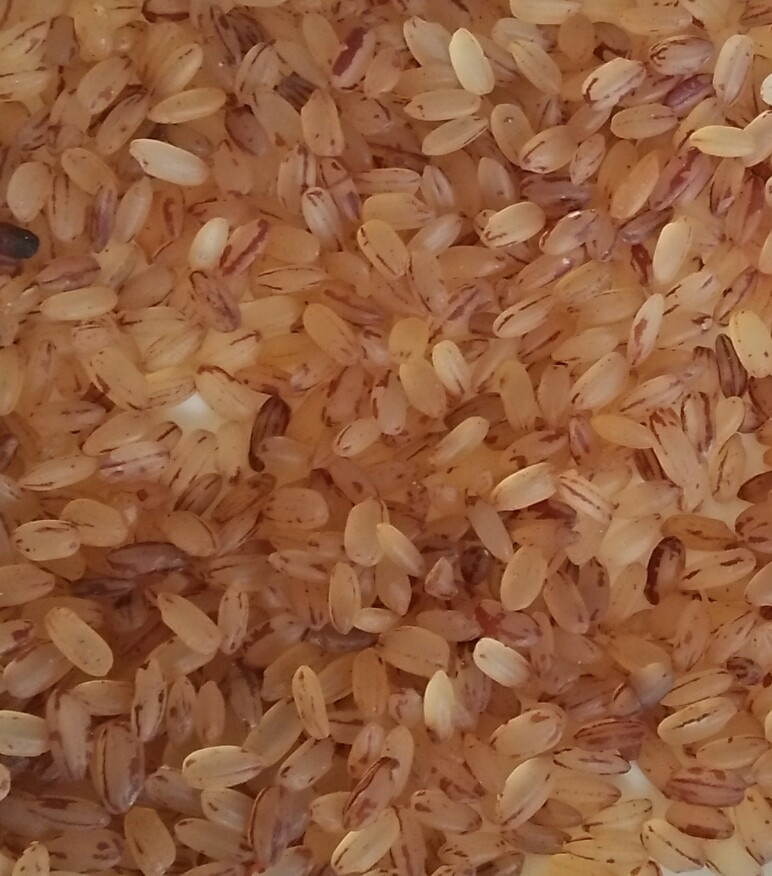
Kerala matta rice/Palakkadan matta rice

=== Uniqueness ===
Palakkadan matta rice is registered under the Geographical Indications of Goods (Registration & Protection) Act, 1999 by the Palakkad Matta Farmers Producer Company Ltd. It is a coarse variety of rice with bold grains and red pericarp. The rice has a unique taste. The coarse rice with red pericarp by itself ensures high content of nutrients. Par-boiling of the rice further ensures retention of nutritional value. The grains are grown on unique black cotton or regar soil, derived from rocks rich in lime peculiar to Palakkad, also in Poonthalpadam where the soil is heavy, containing 60–80% of clay and silt and possess low permeability and high-water holding capacity. These soils, the humid weather of Palakkad, easterly winds that blow through the Palakkad gap and the rivers that flow from the Western Ghats.

=== Preparation ===
Parboiled rice is harder than white rice and needs some thirty minutes of soaking before cooking.

Matta rice is traditionally double cooked.

The rice is washed in a large pan and left to soak from 1 hour to overnight. The rice is drained and simmered with 4 to 8 parts water for 30 minutes. It is then covered and left for 15–20 minutes. The rice is then salted and boiled for another 15–20 minutes or until cooked. It is finally drained and left covered for a further 10–15 minutes before serving.

== Quality ==
Paddy is thoroughly cleaned and destoned prior to boiling and drying process. Final finished rice is graded for removing brokens and again colour sorted in computerised sorting machines and well packed.

== Nutrition benefits ==
Palakkadan Matta rice is more nutritious than white polished rice because parboiling before milling retains some nutrients. One serving cup of 1/4 size can contain 160 calories and 1 gram of fiber. White rice doesn't contain any fibre. The brown outer layer of the Matta rice contains many nutrients. One cup of Matta rice can contain 84 milligrams of magnesium and one gram of calcium. It also contains vitamins.

== E-commerce application by farmers ==
Some farms have adopted technology to ship matta rice from the farm to customers.

== Adulteration ==
A serious health hazard is the wide availability of artificially colored matta rice. The color added for this purpose can be harmful to the body. There are complaints that such varieties are widely distributed through the subsidized public distribution systems on which the poor depend heavily.

== See also ==
- Sadhya – a dish in Kerala cuisine sometimes prepared using matta rice
- Nanjanagud banana
- Coorg orange
- Coorg Green Cardamom
