= Navara rice =

One type of rice

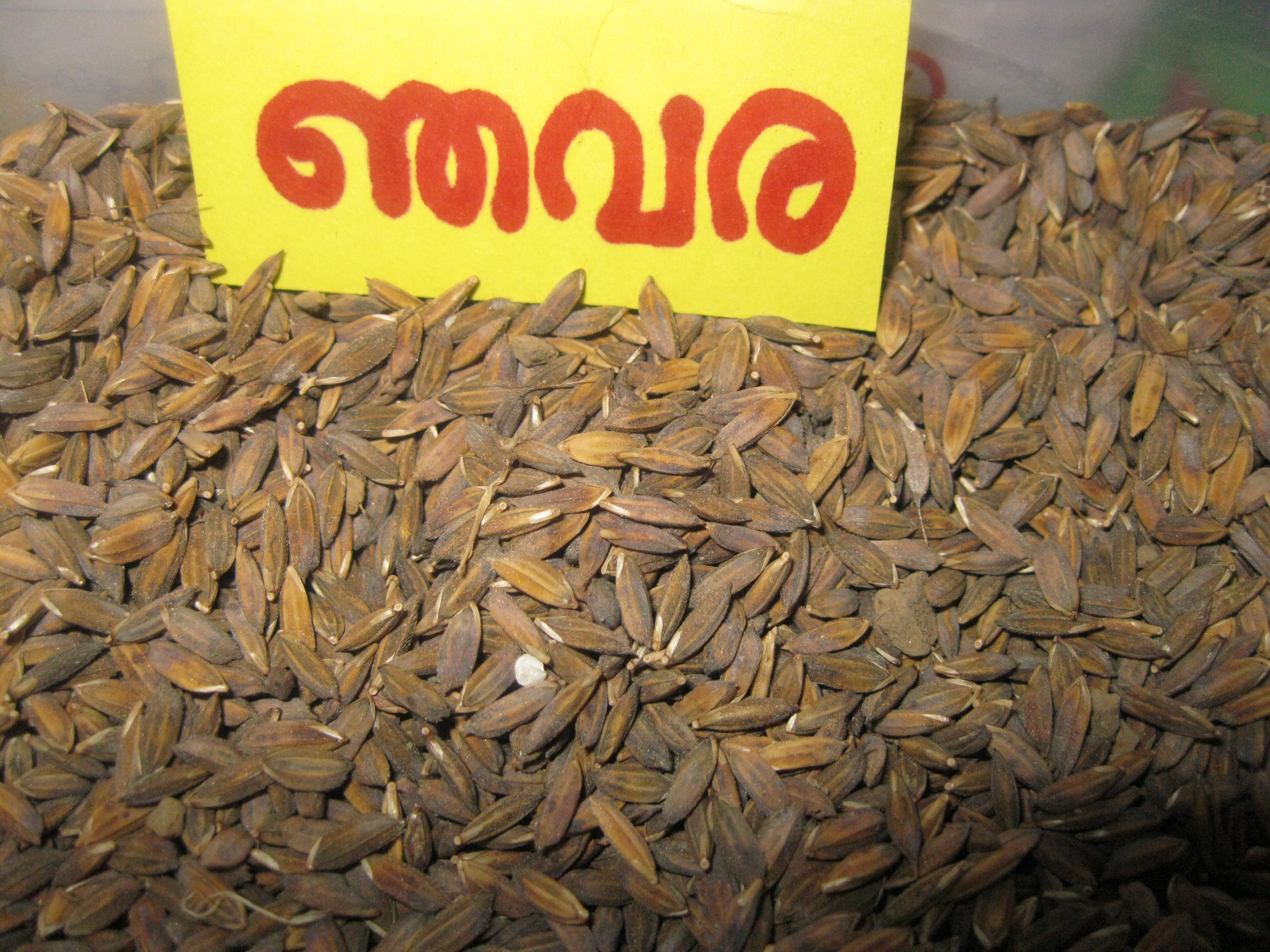
Navara rice seed

Navara rice (or Njavara rice, Malayalam: [n̪ɐʋɐɾa, ɲɐʋɐɾɐ]) is one of the many types of rice found in India, and is a unique grain plant in the Oryza group. It originated in Palakkad (Palghat) district Kerala, where it is regarded as endemic.

in 2007-09, it was granted geographical indication (GI) status, recognising its distinct quality tied to its specific region of origin.

The rice is often powdered and then mixed with milk and taken in the form of a cereal.

Navara also has religious significance and is sometimes used in temples for ceremonies.

== Medicinal properties ==
this variety has also been a part of traditional medicines and is used in things like baby food, broth for pregnant women and in daily health issues. it is also used in Navarakizhi a local therapy where the rice is cooked with milk and herbs to help losing step joints and ease muscle pain.

== See also ==
- Mysore betel leaf
- Nanjanagud banana
- Byadagi chilli
