= Kamalapur Red Banana =

Red Banana Variety

- Geographical indication
- Type: Fruit
- Area: Kamalapur
- Country: India
- Material: Red Banana

Kamalapur Red Banana is a special variety of Red banana which is exclusively grown in the valley of Kamalapur village and its surrounding areas in Kalaburagi district of Karnataka, India. It is known as a "rich man's fruit" as it is marketed at a higher price compared to other varieties of banana due to greater inputs in farming with fertilizer (compost, in particular in large quantity), water, and workforce. While its skin is red coloured, the pulp is creamy in colour with an enjoyable taste. It has a high calorie value with Vitamin C and B6, which makes it a health food.

The horticultural product is protected under the Geographical Indications of Goods (Registration & Protection) Act (GI Act) 1999 of the Government of India. It was registered by the Controller General of Patents Designs and Trademarks under the title "Kamalapur Red Banana" and recorded at GI Application number 133 under Class 31 as a horticulture item. In view of its GI identity, genetic engineering tests are not allowed to be done on this variety of banana, and it is exclusively the property of Kamalapur farming community.

== Geography ==
The villages where this fruit is grown are in Kamalapur and surrounding areas such as in Rajanal and Navanihal villages and covers a total area of about 100 hectares (250 acres). It is grown only on hill slopes in the valley surrounded by hills on three sides which gives the crop protection from damage due to storms as the tree stem is very tall. This variety can not be grown in plain land.

The plant grows in natural rainfall conditions in hot and humid weather. If grown in low lands furrow irrigation or drip irrigation is practiced. The soil type where it is grown consists of red loamy soil which is a gradual transformation from black soil conditions. Locally, the soil is known as "halubilapu" meaning "clay soil" to denote white clay-loam formation which is of shallow depth and drains freely. The soil is calcareous to some extent with organic carbon and has a low degree of alkalinity. The rainfall incidence is of the order of 777 millimetres (30.6 in) for the district.

== Characteristics ==
The plant, with its "stem stout", grows to a height of 22 to 25 feet (6.7 to 7.6 m) with a base of about 3 to 3.2 feet (0.91 to 0.98 m) in circumference and grows with shades of green and yellow colours. Its leaves, oblong in shape, of greenish yellow colour, are long and brittle. The plant's flowers and fruits get set in about 10 to 11 months time followed by a maturity period of about 7–8 months and then harvested in about 18 months. Each tree yields 15 to 20 kg, averaging 11 tons per acre, and is generally free from pests. The skin or the rind of the fruit is in moderate red colour while its pulp is in cream colour, and is of likeable taste.

The planting is done in pits of 50 centimetres (20 in) square dug to 50 centimetres (20 in) depth and filled with a thin layer of ash followed by compost, neem leaves, topsoil and organic manure. Planting is done thereafter in about 2 weeks time. The planting is done at a spacing of 7 ft in either direction. In a recent innovation, following the planting practice in Israel, adopted in India by the National Council of Research in Banana (NCRB), the spacing of plants has been modified into a triangular pattern which can now accommodate 1,710 plants instead of earlier 1,210 plants per acre which is said to have increased the yield by about 20 tons per acre. Planting is done during August/September, and before planting, the suckers are dipped in cow dung water overnight to prevent any diseases to the plant. Desuckering operation is carried out at an interval of 45 days and the total time taken from planting to harvesting is about 18 months. There are no "pre or post harvest techniques" for its preservation. However, the bunches are kept in airtight chambers with incense burning to facilitate the fruit to ripen early.

== Chemical properties ==
The nutritional status of the fruits has been tested at the Central Food Technological Research Institute (CFTRI), which indicates that the fruit has a composition of calcium, iron, potassium and fibre which is much superior to that of other banana types. Its calorie content is high with Vitamin C and B6. The Total Soluble Solids (TSS) is reported to be 20-22 degrees Brix.

The agency which regulates the quality standards is the Department of Forestry and Environmental Science of the University of Agricultural Sciences, Bangalore.

== Incentives ==
The Horticulture department is encouraging farmers to extend their area of cultivation under this fruit crop by providing certified seeds at subsidized rates along with other incentives.

== See also ==
- Nanjanagud Banana
- Coorg orange
- Udupi Mattu Gulla
