= Guntur Sannam =

Type of chili pepper that grows in India

Guntur Sannam chilli
- Species: Capsicum annuum
- Origin: India
- Heat: Hot
- Scoville scale: 35,000–40,000 SHU

Guntur Sannam or Capsicum annuum var. longum, is a variety of chili pepper that grows in the districts of Guntur, Prakasam (Andhra Pradesh), Warangal (Telangana), and Khammam in India. It is registered as one of the geographical indications of Andhra Pradesh (pursuant to Geographical Indications of Goods (Registration and Protection) Act, 1999).

== Origin ==
The Guntur Sannam pepper belongs to the species Capsicum annuum. It is a commercial crop used as a condiment and culinary supplement.

India stands first place in the production of chilies. The state of Andhra Pradesh leads in its production, providing 46% of all chilies produced in India. The government of Andhra Pradesh started a regional research station at LAM near Guntur around 30 years ago, which also studies the uses of chili.

Etymologically, the name 'Guntur Sannam' has its origin in Telugu, and indicates two facts: the origin of the fruit, and more importantly, the strong antecedents arising from Andhra Pradesh. Guntur has been associated with chilies for decades, and hence the prefix 'Guntur' for the name of this chili. The word 'Sannani' in Telugu means 'thin'.

== Characteristics ==
The Guntur Sannam chili's unique characteristics have brought it international acclaim. The Sannam chili is traded as an S4 type chili and is mainly used for its pungency and the extraction and derivation of capsaicin, which is an active component in chilies that gives them their hot qualities. The following are the chief attributes/characteristics of Guntur Sannam chili:

- The Guntur Sannam chili belongs to Capsicum annuum var. longum, with long fruits (5 to 15 cm. In length) and diameter range from 0.5 to 1.5 cm.
- The chili has thick skin.
- The skin of the chili, when crushed, is thick, red and hot.
- The chili has an average rating of 35,000 to 40,000 SHU.
- The chili is red with an ASTA color value of about 32.11.
- The content of Capsaicin is about 0.226%.
- This chili is rich in vitamin C (185 mg/100 g) and protein (11.98 g/100 g).

== Cultivation ==
Guntur Sannam has its peak harvesting season from December to March. The annual production of this type is approximately 280,000 tonnes. The Guntur Sannam chili has specific requirements in its means of production for attaining an optimum level of production. Guntur Sannam crops are highly prone to disease, and therefore need special care and attention to ensure a healthy, pest-free yield.

Guntur Sannam Factsheet
Producing Centers	Andhra Pradesh, Tamil Nadu, Maharashtra, Karnataka, Rajasthan, Assam
Harvesting seasons	January to March or December to March
ASTA Colour Value	32.11
Capsaicin content	0.226%
Annual Production	280,000 Tonnes

=== Geographical area of production ===
The Guntur Sannam chili is cultivated, processed, and made available mainly from the Guntur district of Andhra Pradesh. It is also grown in neighboring regions such as the districts of Prakasam, Warangal, and Khammam.

The Guntur Sannam chili requires a warm and humid climate for its growth, and dry weather during its period of maturation. The crop can be grown at altitudes up to 2,100 meters above sea level. Black soils with a pH value from 6 to 7 and retaining moisture for long periods of time are suitable for a rain-fed crop; whereas well drained chalky, deltaic, and sandy loamy soils are good under irrigated conditions.

District & State	Latitude	Longitude
Guntur, Andhra Pradesh	15.55°N to 16.35°N	79.19°E to 80.36°E
Warangal, Telangana	17.30°N to 18.18°N	78.25°E to 80.15°E
Prakasam, Andhra Pradesh	14.57°N to 16.17°N	78.43°E to 80.25°E
Khammam, Telangana	16.48°N to 18.18°N	79.30°E to 81.18°E

== Grades and comparison ==
At least 4 grades of Guntur Sannam chilies are known to exist. They are:

- Sannam Special (S.S.): light red in color, shining skin, with a length of 5 cm and more.
- Sannam General (S.G.): light red in color, shining skin, with a length of 3 to 5 cm.
- Sannam Fair (S.F.): blackish/dull red in color with a length of 3 to 5 cm.
- Non-Specified (N.S.): This is not a regular grade and is meant to meet specific requirements of the buyers which are not covered under regular grades.

Capsaicin values of some of the well-known and accepted varieties of Indian chilis are:

Chilis	Capsaicin content
Guntur Sannam – S4 Type	0.226%
Byadagi (Kaddi)	Negligible
Nalchetti (Semi Bird Eye)	0.12%
Kashmiri (Annigira)	NA
S9 Mundu	NA
Wonderhot	NA
Tomato Chili (Warangal)	NA
Madras Pari	0.206%

== See also ==
- Byadagi chilli
- List of Capsicum cultivars
- List of Geographical Indications in India
- Coorg Green Cardamom
