= Geographical Indications of Goods (Registration and Protection) Act, 1999 =

Parliament of India
- Long title: An Act to provide for the registration and better protection of geographical indications relating to goods.
- Citation: Act No. 48 of 1999
- Enacted by: Parliament of India
- Assented to: 30 December 1999
- Commenced: 15 September 2003
- Status: In force

The Geographical Indications of Goods (Registration and Protection) Act, 1999 (GI Act) is a sui generis Act of the Parliament of India for protection of geographical indications in India. India, as a member of the World Trade Organization (WTO), enacted the Act to comply with the Agreement on Trade-Related Aspects of Intellectual Property Rights. The GI tag ensures that only those registered as authorised users (or at least those residing inside the geographic territory) are allowed to use the popular product name. Darjeeling tea became the first GI tagged product in India, in 2004–05, since then 370 goods had been added to the list as of August 2020.

== Geographical indication ==
According to section 2 (1)(e) of the Act, Geographical indication has been defined as "an indication which identifies such goods as agricultural goods, natural goods or manufactured goods as originating, or manufactured in the territory of a country, or a region or locality in that territory, where a given quality, reputation or other characteristic of such goods is essentially attributable to its geographical origin and in case where such goods are manufactured goods one of the activities of either the production or of processing or preparation of the goods concerned takes place in such territory, region or locality, as the case may be."

Some of the registered geographical indications includes, agricultural goods like Darjeeling tea, Malabar pepper, Bangalore Blue grapes, manufactured goods like Pochampalli ikat, Kanchipuram silk sari, Solapuri chaddars, Bagh prints, and Madhubani paintings. A more complete list is available at List of Geographical Indications in India.

== Registration process ==
- An application for registration must be made before the Registrar of Geographical Indications by any association of persons or producers or any organization or authority established by or under any law for the time being in force representing the interest of the producers of the concerned goods.
- The application must be made in an appropriate form containing the nature, quality, reputation or other characteristics of which are due exclusively or essentially to the geographical environment, manufacturing process, natural and human factors, map of territory of production, appearance of geographical indication (figurative or words), list of producers, along with prescribed fees.
- The examiner will make a preliminary scrutiny for deficiencies, in case of deficiencies, the applicant have to remedy it within a period of one month from the date of communication.
- The Registrar may accept, partially accept or refuse the application. In case of refusal, the Registrar will give written grounds for non acceptance. The applicant must within two months file reply. In case of re-refusal, the applicant can make an appeal within one month of such decision.
- Registrar shall, within three months of acceptance may advertise the application in the GI Journal.
- If there is no opposition, the Registrar will grant a certificate of registration to the applicant and authorised users.

== Duration ==
A GI is registered for an initial period of ten years, which may be renewed from time to time.

== Exclusions ==
Under Section 9 of the Act, the following indications cannot be registered:

- which would likely to deceive or cause confusion
- which would be contrary to any law for the time being in force; or
- which comprises or contains scandalous or obscene matter; or
- which comprise or contains any matter likely to hurt the religious susceptibilities of any class or section of the citizens of India; or
- which would otherwise be disentitled to protection in a court; or
- generic names
- falsely represent to the persons that the goods originate in another territory, region or locality, as the case may be

== Effect of registration and infringement ==
Registration of a GI gives its owner and the authorised users the exclusive right to use the indications on the good in which it is registered. Further, registration gives right to institution of suit against infringement and recovery of damages for such infringement. Infringement can be caused by use of the GI on such goods which indicates that such goods originate in such place other than its true place of origin or due to unfair competition. However, in case of non-registered GIs, a case of passing off can be instituted. Registration acts as a prima facie evidence of validity of the indication and ownership. The registration cannot be transferred, mortgaged, assigned or licensed, except in case of inheritance of the mark upon death of an authorised user.

Any person who falsely applies or falsifies any geographical indication, tampers the origin of a good, make or have in possession of dye, blocks, machines to use in falsification of GI may be punished shall not be less than six months but which may extend to three years and with fine which shall not be less than fifty thousand rupees but which may extend to two lakhs (200,000) rupees. In case of second and for every subsequent offence, a person can be punished with imprisonment for a term which shall not be less than one year but which may extend to three years and with fine which shall not be less than one lakh rupees but which may extend to two lakh rupees. However, the judge may under certain condition may reduce the sentence, and reasons for reduction of punishment must be written in the judgment. Other offences includes, falsely represent a GI to be registered, falsification of entries in register, falsely representing a place to be connected with GI Registry.

== See also ==
- List of Geographical Indications in India
