= Mysore betel leaf =

- Geographical indication
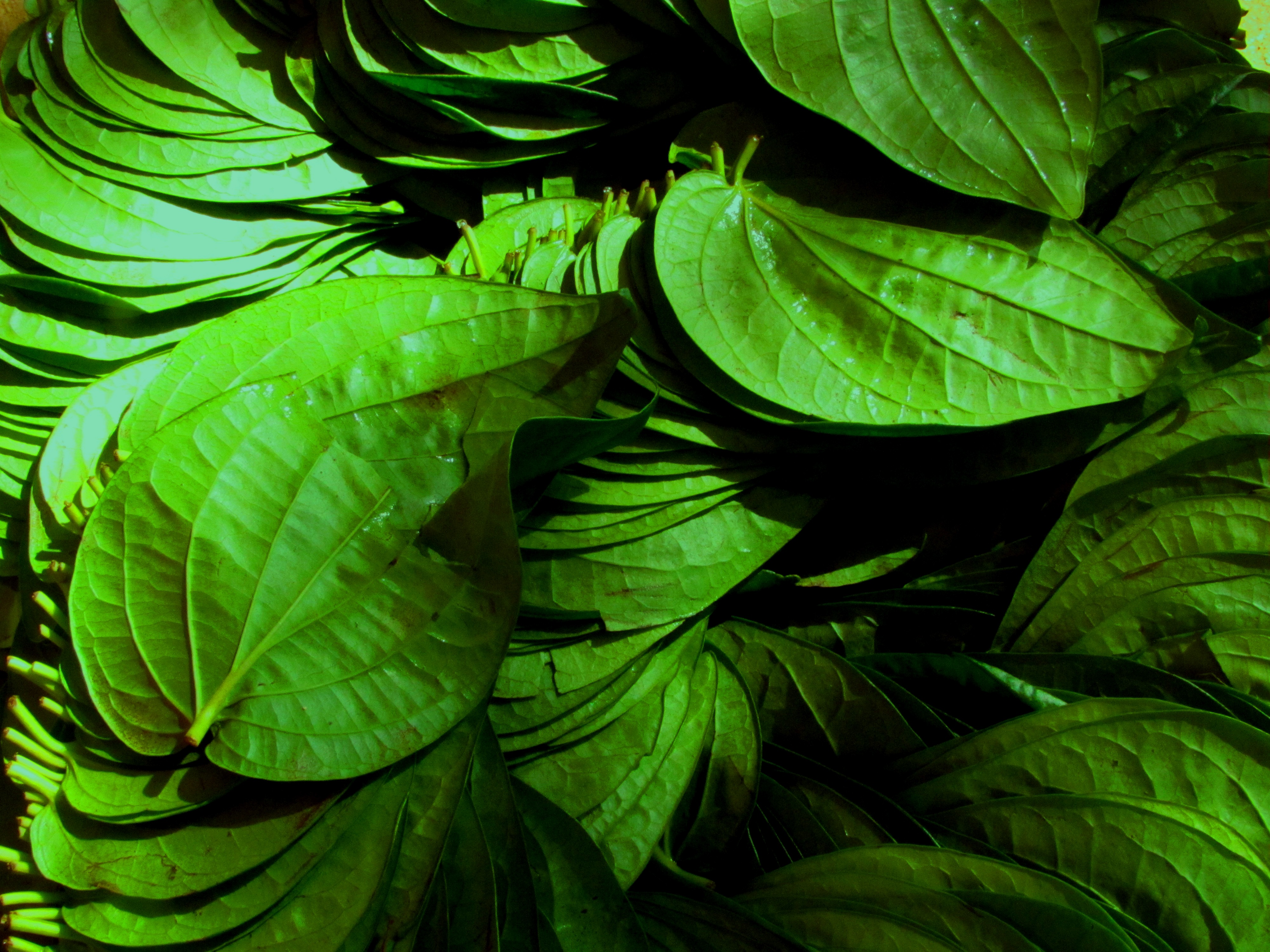
- A sheaf of Mysore Betel leaves for sale in Bengaluru
- Type: Betel leaf
- Area: Mysore district
- Country: India
- Registered: 2005
- Official website: http://ipindia.nic.in

Mysore betel leaf is a variety of heart shaped betel (Piper betel) leaf grown in and around the region of Mysore. It is consumed as a betel quid or as paan, with or without tobacco. A sheaf of betel leaves is traditionally offered as a mark of respect and auspicious beginnings. Areca nut are kept on top of the sheaf of betel leaves and offered to the elders for their blessings and during wedding ceremonies.

Mysore betel leaves are said to differ from other betel leaves because of their smooth texture and hot taste. They are protected by the government of India.

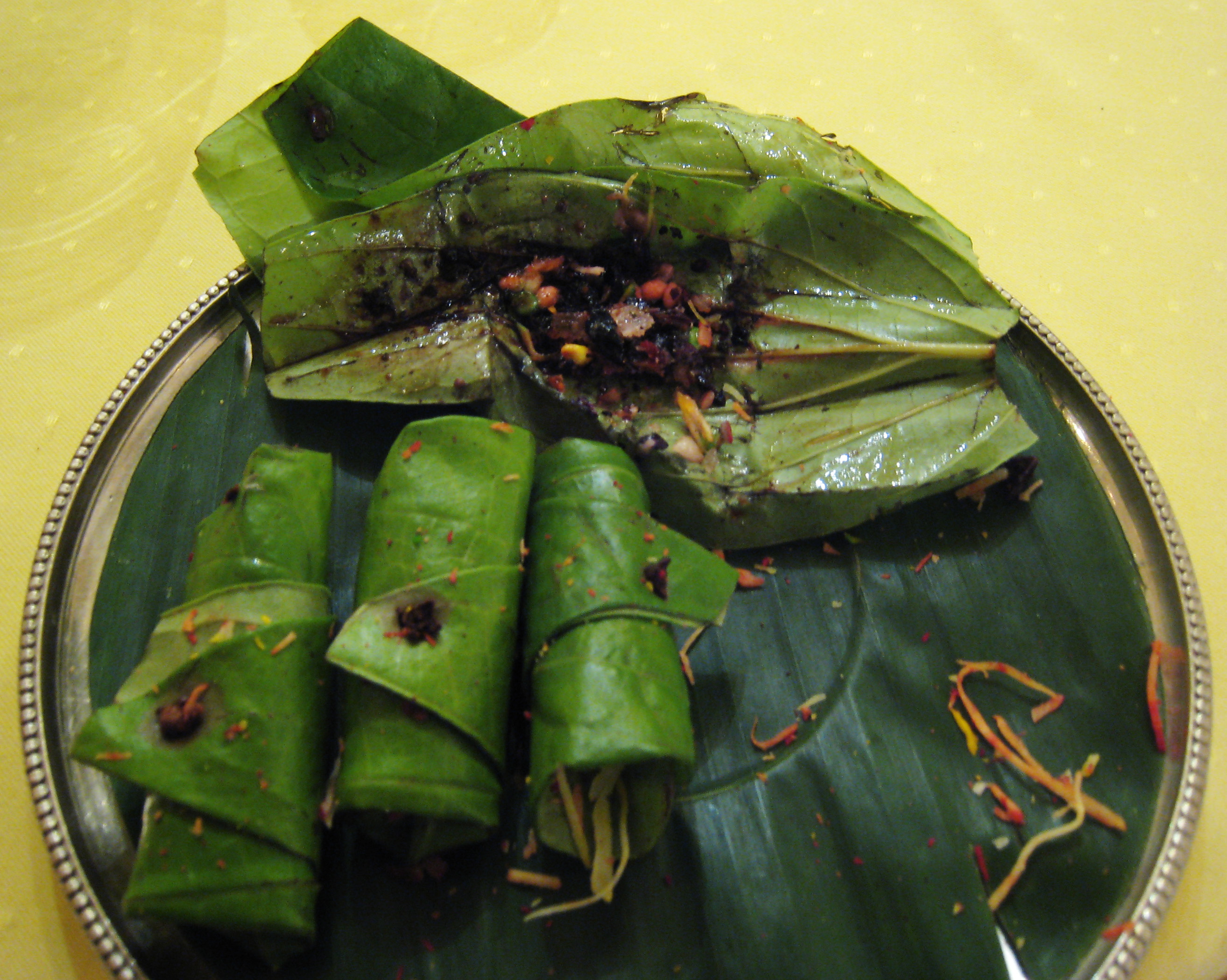
Mysore Betel leaves being used to make paan

== History ==
The betel leaf, which is native to the Indian subcontinent, has been used for 5000 years. About 50 years ago, the Mysore betel leaves were grown in the gardens of the Mysore Maharaja and were later spread to 100 acres from Poorniah Choultry in Old Agrahara to Vidyaranyapuram junction, which connects the Mysore-Nanjangud Road in Mysore. Gradually, it was spread to about 500 acres around Mysore. Unique climate and soil in this stretch is thought to have given the leaves a unique taste that earned it the name ‘Mysore Chigurele’ (Mysore sprout leaf). The leaf has a smooth texture and hot taste.

== Cultivation and requirement ==
The betel plant is a tropical plant, so it needs a warm and humid climate to grow properly. It thrives best under shade and in a temperature ranging from 10 to 40 degrees. The presence of black clay in the soil along with the hot, humid climate gives the Mysore betel leaf special characteristics.

== Geographical Indication ==
The Department for Horticulture under the government of Karnataka proposed the registration of the Mysore betel leaf to the Office of the Controller-General of Patents, Designs and Trademarks, Chennai, under the Geographical Indications of Goods Act (1999). This is done so that the farmers of Mysore exclusively have the right to brand their product using the term Mysore betel leaf. It was granted the Geographical Indication status three years later, in 2005.

== See also ==
- List of Geographical Indications in India
- paan
- mysore
- Betel container (Victoria & Albert Museum)
- Quid-chewing
- Nanjanagud banana
- Coorg orange
