= Guntur chilli =

Group of chilli pepper cultivars

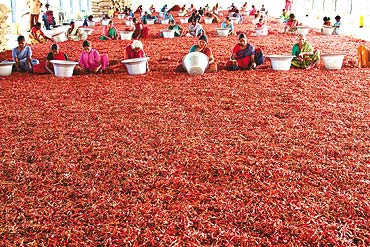
- Guntur chillies drying in the sun in Andhra Pradesh, India
- Species: Capsicum annum L
- Heat: Very hot
- Scoville scale: 30,000–350,000 SHU

Guntur chillies (Telugu: Guntūru mirapakāyalu) are a group of chilli cultivars from the Guntur and Prakasam districts of Andhra Pradesh, India. They are renowned globally and exported to Asia, Canada, and Europe. The Guntur district is the main producer and exporter of most varieties of chillies and chilli powder from India to regions such as Sri Lanka, Bangladesh, Middle East, South Korea, the UK, the US, and Latin America. Chillies have various colours and flavours because of the level of capsaicin in them. Guntur chillies form an important part of curries and various popular dishes of the state of Andhra Pradesh in India. The main trading place for the Guntur chilli is called Guntur Mirchi Yard. Market prices for the chillies are accessible on the National Agriculture Market or e-NAM.

== Guntur chilli cultivators ==
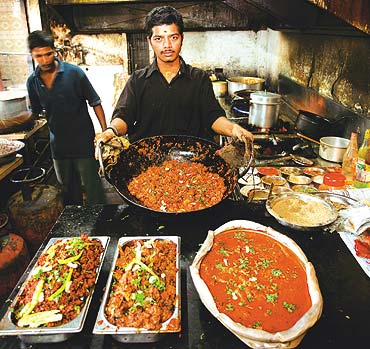
Guntur chillies form an important part of Andhra cuisine

- 334 chilli is a premium export-quality chilli.
- Teja chilli is a fine variety of Guntur chilli.
- Guntur Sannam – S4 Type is the most famous type among the chillies and has a huge demand throughout the world. It grows widely in the Guntur, and Prakasam districts of Andhra Pradesh, as well as Warangal, and Khammam districts of Telangana. The skin of the crushed chilli is thick, red, and hot. It has its peak harvesting season from December to May. The annual production of this type is approximately 280,000 tonnes. It has an ASTA colour value of 50–80 and pungency is 35,000–45,000 SHU.
- 273 chilli is a common wrinkled chilli.

Other Guntur chillis are Phatki, Indo-5, Ankur, Roshni, Bedki, and Madhubala.

== See also ==
- Guntur Sannam
- GI Tagged Guntur Sannam Chilli
