= Coorg green cardamom =

Variety of cardamom

Coorg green cardamom is a green variety of cardamom grown in Coorg, Karnataka.

== Geographical indication rights ==
Coorg green cardamom received Intellectual Property Rights Protection or Geographical Indication (GI) status.

== See also ==
- Bangalore Blue
- Byadagi chilli
- Coorg orange
- Mattu gulla
- Nanjanagud banana
