= Solapuri chaddar =

Cotton blanket made in Solapur, India

A Solapur chaddar (lit: "Solapur blanket ") is a cotton blanket made in Solapur, a city in the Indian state of Maharashtra. These blankets are popular in India where they are manufactured, previously by hand loom but now by Jacquard machine, and are known for their unique design and durability. Solapuri chaddars were the first product of Solapur, Maharashtra, to obtain Geographical Indication (GI) status.

== History ==
Solapur is known for its textile industry. The city once had Asia's largest spinning mills. The development of the handloom weaving industry in Solapur seems to have commenced during the regime of the Peshwas. There were numerous small independent artisan weavers in the industry. Each artisan-house had one or two looms which were generally handled by the head of the family. The family was the unit of work and the women and the children helped the weaver in preparatory processes and in some cases in dyeing also. The rise of the modern factory in India in the 1970s altered the organisation of the local hand-loom weaving industry. They have been manufactured by Padmashali weavers from South India since their presence in Solapur in the 1950s. Many companies manufacture chaddars in Solapur district.

== Export ==
Apart from Maharashtra, Solapuri Chaddar has demand in Karnataka, Telangana, Andhra Pradesh, Madhya Pradesh, Gujarat, Rajasthan within India, while it also has demand in United Arab Emirates, Kuwait, South Africa, United States, United Kingdom and Canada.

== See also ==
- Byadagi chilli
- Ilkal saree
- Navalgund Durries
