= Bangalore rose onion =

Indian onion variety

Bangalore rose onion, locally called gulabi eerulli, is a variety of onion grown in and around Bangalore in Karnataka. It received the Geographical Indication tag in 2015.

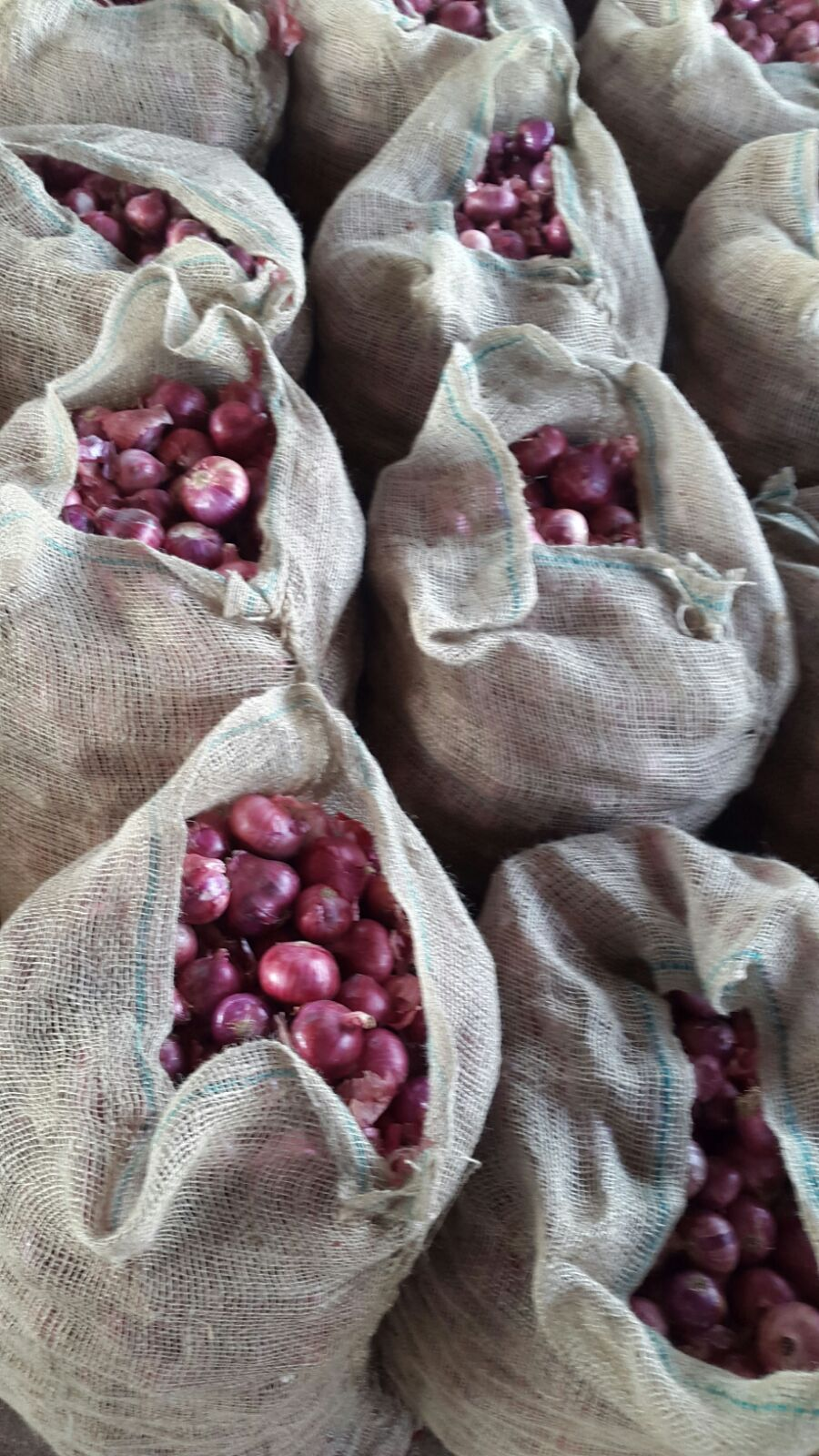
Bangalore rose onions at a market stand

== History ==
Bangalore rose onions are grown in the districts of Bangalore Urban, Bangalore Rural, Chikkaballapur and Kolar. They are also grown in Tumkur, Hassan, Davanagere, Dharwad and Bagalkot. Bangalore rose onions are not cultivated in any other place in India.

== Description ==
The onions of this variety have bulbs with flat base and are spherical. The other characteristics which make them unique are their deep scarlet red colour, anthocyanin, phenols and high pungency. They are also known to contain higher levels of protein, phosphorus, iron and carotene.

The ideal conditions for growing rose onion are: soil with pH between 6.5 and 7, atmospheric humidity of 70 to 75% and average temperature of 25 °C to 30 °C. As these conditions are found around the Bangalore region, the variety is grown exclusively there.

== Export ==
Bangalore rose onions are rarely used in India, but exported in large quantities to other countries such as Malaysia, Singapore, Indonesia, Bahrain, UAE, Bangladesh and Sri Lanka.

During the financial year of 2010–11, over 22,000 tonnes of Bangalore rose onion were exported to other countries. This was lower compared to more than 36,000 and 32,000 tonnes exported in 2003–04 and 2005–06 respectively. More than ₹500 crore worth of rose onion was exported in five years after an Agri Export Zone (AEZ) was set up for the crop in Karnataka.

== Geographical Indication ==
The Bangalore rose onion was granted the Geographical Indication status in 2015. This allowed the Bangalore Rose Onion Growers' Association headquartered in Chikkaballapur to get patent rights to cultivation of the variety.

== See also ==
- Bangalore Blue
- Lasalgaon onion
- Alibag White onion
- List of Geographical Indications in India
