= Alibag White onion =

Type of onion variety from Maharashtra, India

Alibag White onion (अलिबाग पांढरा कांदा)
- Geographical indication
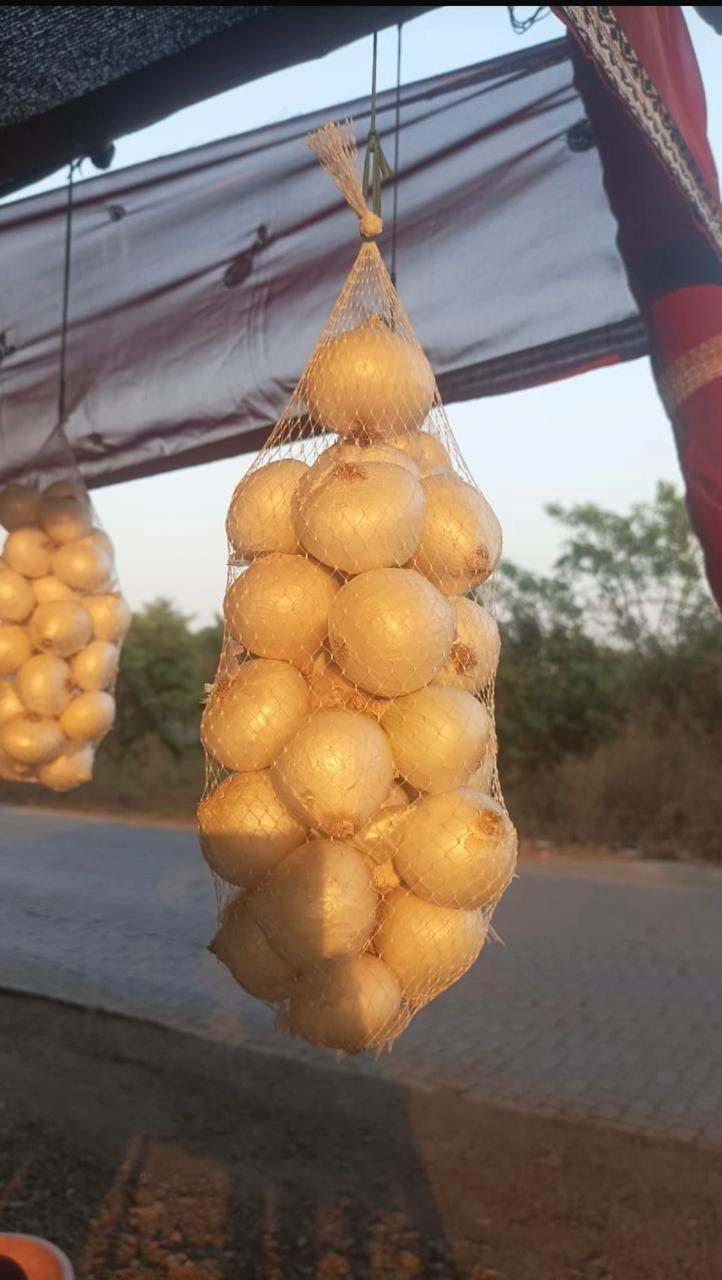
- Alibag White Onions from Pezari village located in Alibag taluka
- Alternative names: Alibag Pandhara Kanda
- Description: Alibag White onion is a white onion variety in Maharashtra
- Type: onion
- Area: Alibag
- Country: India
- Registered: 16 November 2022
- Official website: ipindia.gov.in

Alibag White onion is a traditional variety of white onion grown in the Indian state of Maharashtra. It is a common and widely cultivated crop in the Alibag taluka of the Raigad district. This onion is characterized by its sweetness, low pungency, and high nutritional value. It is traditionally cultivated in Alibag, specifically in villages such as Karle, Khandale, Nehuli, Talvali, Sagaon, and Wadgaon. It has been recognized since 1883 in the official gazette and known for its medicinal properties, for its health benefits, including treating heart ailments, controlling cholesterol, and regulating insulin.

Under its Geographical Indication tag, it is referred to as "Alibag White onion".

== Name ==
Alibag White onion is a prized, native vegetable crop in Alibag and so named after it.

=== Local name ===
It is known locally as "Alibag Pandhara Kanda" (अलिबाग पांढरा कांदा). The word "Pandhara" refers to the white colour while "Kanda" means onion in the local state language of Marathi.

== Description ==
List of characteristics and facts about Alibag White onion:

=== Cultivation and Harvesting ===
- Alibag White onions are grown using traditional farming practices, preserving the pure variety of the onion. The cultivation takes place after the rice harvest, utilizing the remaining moisture in the field. Locals have developed farming and storage practices over time through experience and gathered knowledge.

=== Unique Characteristics ===
- Sweet taste and low pungency
- Low pyruvic acid content
- Low sulphur content
- High protein, fat, and fiber content
- Unique method of preparation of onion braids (veni)

=== Storage and Shelf Life ===
- Alibag White Onion veni (braid) is prepared by skilled village women who weave the onion tops into braids, which are then paired and sold as 3–4 kg juddis, enabling storage for up to one year.

== Geographical indication ==
It was awarded the Geographical Indication (GI) status tag from the Geographical Indications Registry, under the Union Government of India, on 16 November 2022.

Alibag Pandhara Kanda Shetkari Utpadak Gat from Alibag, proposed the GI registration of Alibag White onion. After filing the application in January 2020, the onion was granted the GI tag in 2022 by the Geographical Indication Registry in Chennai, making the name "Alibag White onion" exclusive to the onion grown in the region. It thus became the second onion variety from Maharashtra after Lasalgaon onion and the 34th type of goods from Maharashtra to earn the GI tag.

The GI tag protects the onion from illegal selling and marketing, and gives it legal protection and a unique identity.

== See also ==
- Lasalgaon onion
- Bangalore rose onion
