= Lasalgaon onion =

Type of onion variety from Maharashtra, India

Lasalgaon onion (लासलगाव कांदा)
- Geographical indication
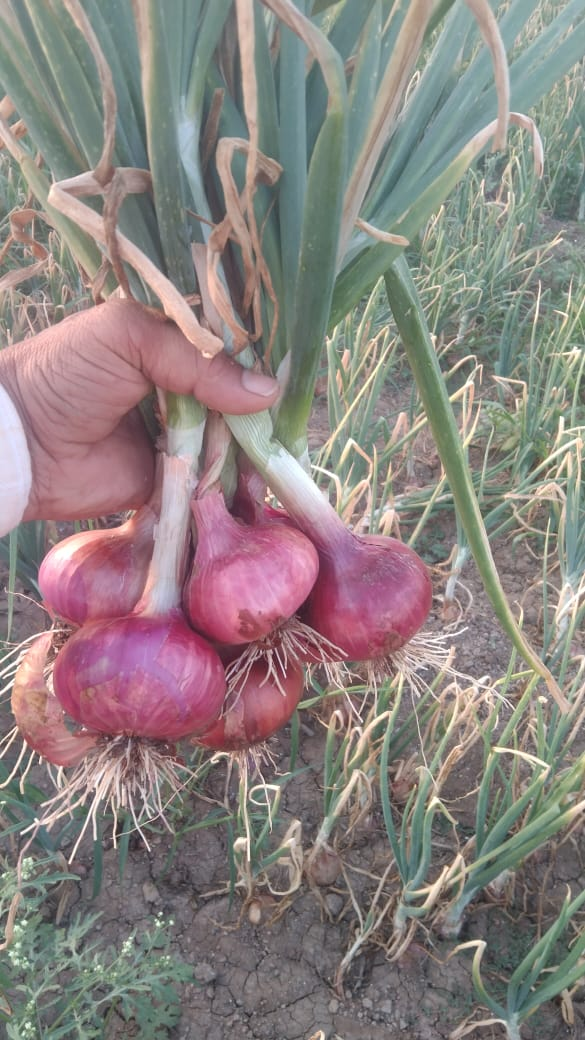
- Lasalgaon Manganga Gulabi Onions freshly plucked from a field
- Alternative names: Niphad red, Nashik red, Lasalgaon Light Red
- Description: Lasalgaon onion is a red onion variety in Maharashtra
- Type: onion
- Area: Lasalgaon
- Country: India
- Registered: 31 March 2016
- Official website: ipindia.gov.in

Lasalgaon onion is a variety of red onion grown in the Indian state of Maharashtra. It is a common and widely cultivated crop in Lasalgaon located in the Niphad taluka of the Nashik district. Lasalgaon has the biggest and largest onion market in India and the Asian continent. Significantly, the Lasalgaon onion market rate serves as a benchmark, influencing onion prices across the Asian market.

Under its Geographical Indication tag, it is referred to as "Lasalgaon onion".

== Name ==
Lasalgaon is a prominent hub for onion cultivation and thus the onion's name is derived from this town, with 99% of its agricultural area dedicated to this crop, engaging over 1,000 farmers. The region's onion market is equally impressive, handling approximately 2.5 lakh tonnes of onions annually. This variety is also known by other names, including Niphad red and Nashik red.

=== Local name ===
It is known locally as "Lasalgaon Kanda" (लासलगाव कांदा). The word "Kanda" means onion in the local state language of Marathi.

== Description ==
List of characteristics and facts about Lasalgaon onion:

=== Characteristics ===
- Light red color with strong pungent taste
- High percentage of Sulphur in the soil
- Larger bulb size (4–6 cm diameter) with 16-17 layers of outer dried intact scales
- High total soluble sugar content (13°Brix) and high dry matter content (17.67-17.27%)
- Long storage life (8–9 months)

=== Uses ===
- Used in direct consumption or mixed with other vegetables and soups
- Used as a condiment and flavoring agent
- Made into sauce, ketchup, and chutney
- Exported as dried onion chips and powder
- Rich in vitamins B and C, and minerals Ca and Fe
- Medicinal properties for treating ear aches, colic pain, and more

=== Cultivation ===
- Onion production typically occurs in three seasons: Kharif (May–July to Oct-Dec.), Late-Kharif (Aug-Sep. to Jan-Mar), and Rabi (Oct-Nov. to April–June).
- The Lasalgaon Light Red variety is specifically cultivated during the Rabi season, which spans from October to March.
- Lasalgaon has a well-established market with many traders and a railway station, facilitating efficient marketing. The region's traditional method of onion storage (chawl) and cultivation practices have been passed down through generations.

=== Soil and Climate ===
- The black soil of Lasalgaon has a unique composition, with high alumina, carbonates of calcium and magnesium, and variable amounts of potash. The soil pH ranges from 6–8, making it mildly to moderately alkaline. The high sulphur content in the soil contributes to the onion's pungent taste.

=== Storage facilities ===
- The Bhabha Atomic Research Centre (BARC) has established a specialized cold storage facility for onions at Krushak, the irradiation centre in Lasalgaon, Nashik in December 2023. This facility boasts a storage capacity of 250 tonnes.

=== Exports ===
- The export of Lasalgaon onions is driven by strong demand from countries such as Singapore, The United Arab Emirates (UAE), Sri Lanka, Maldives and Bangladesh.

== Photo Gallery ==
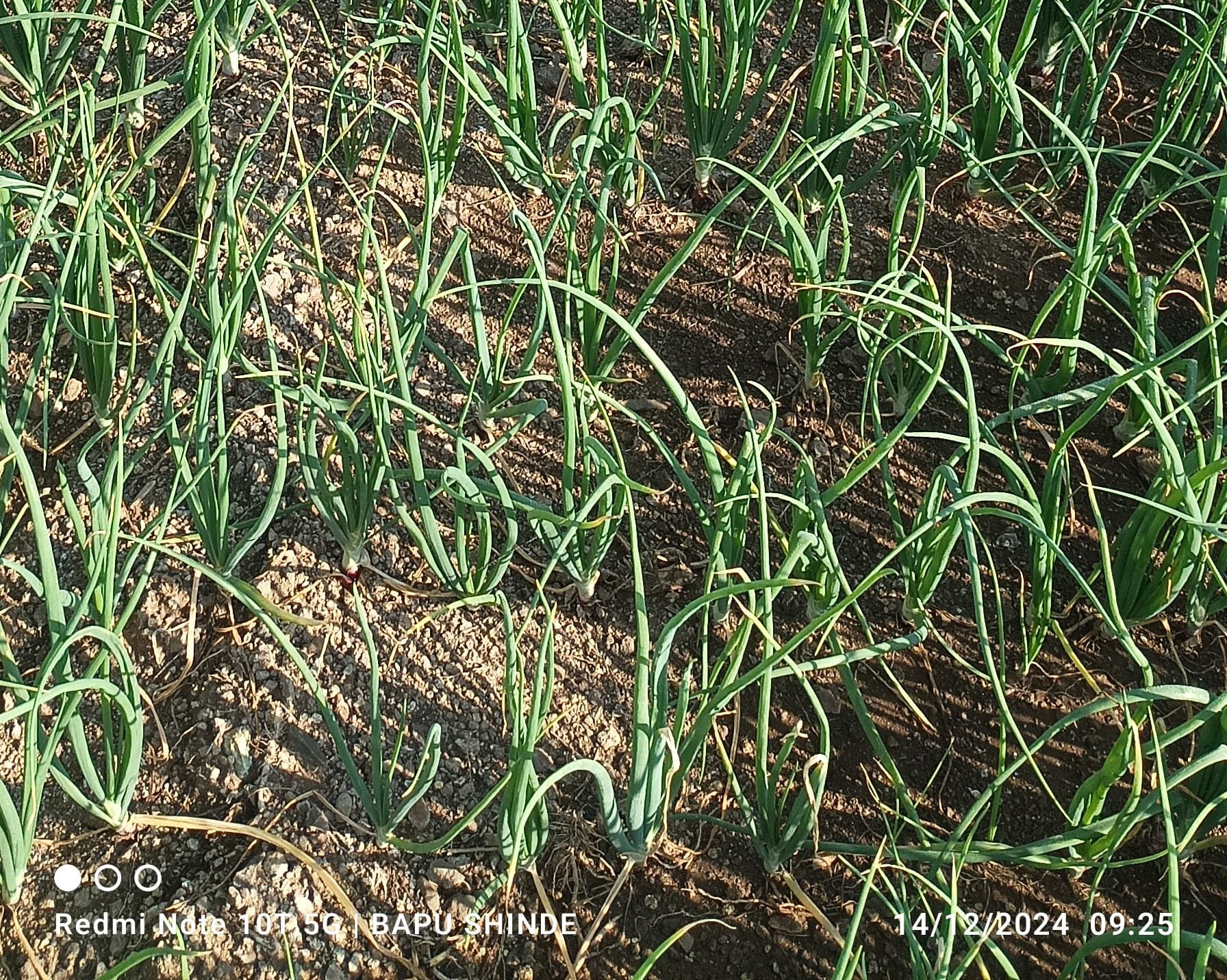
Closeup of the onion cultivation in a field crop

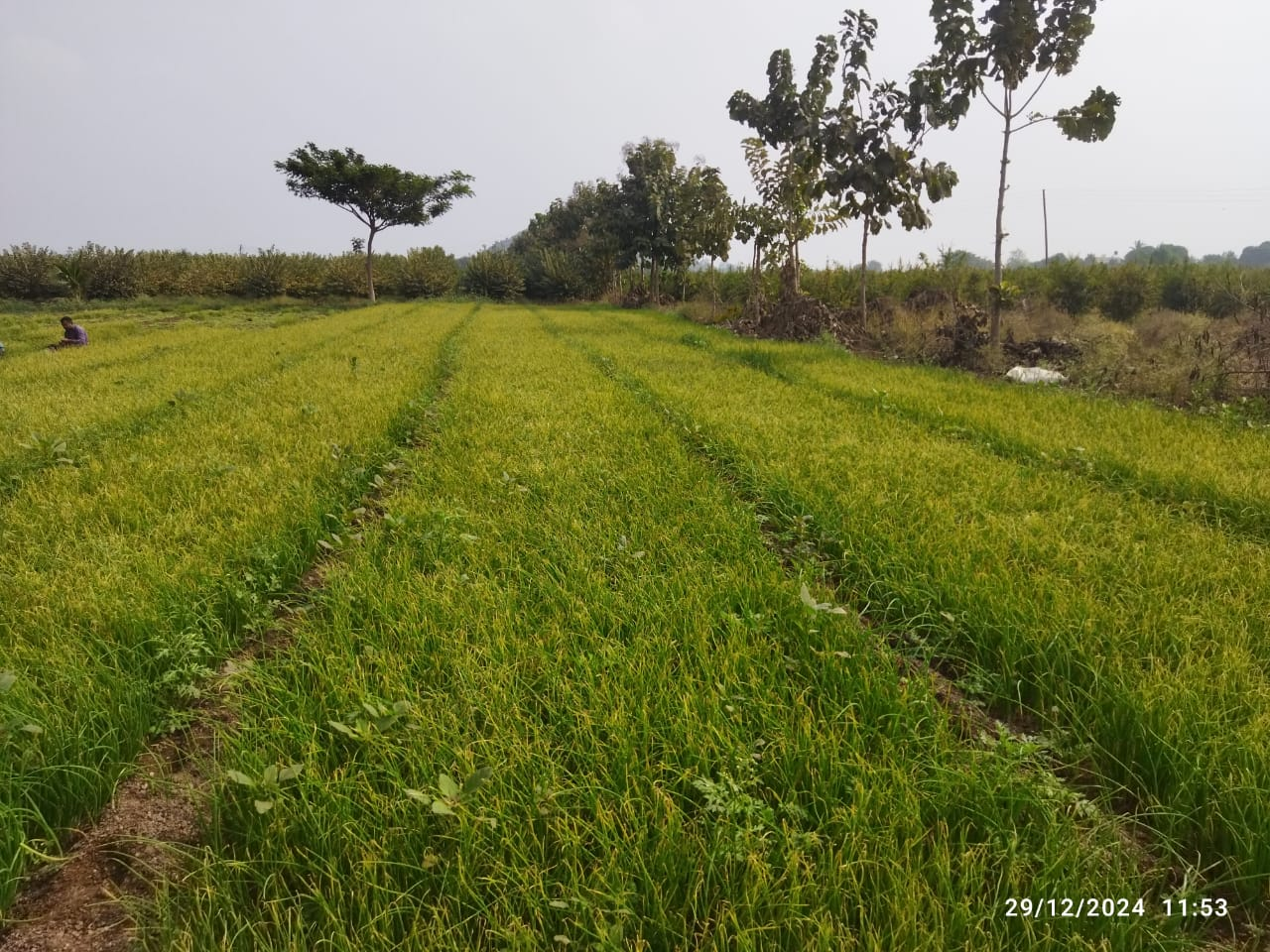
Onion cultivation in a field

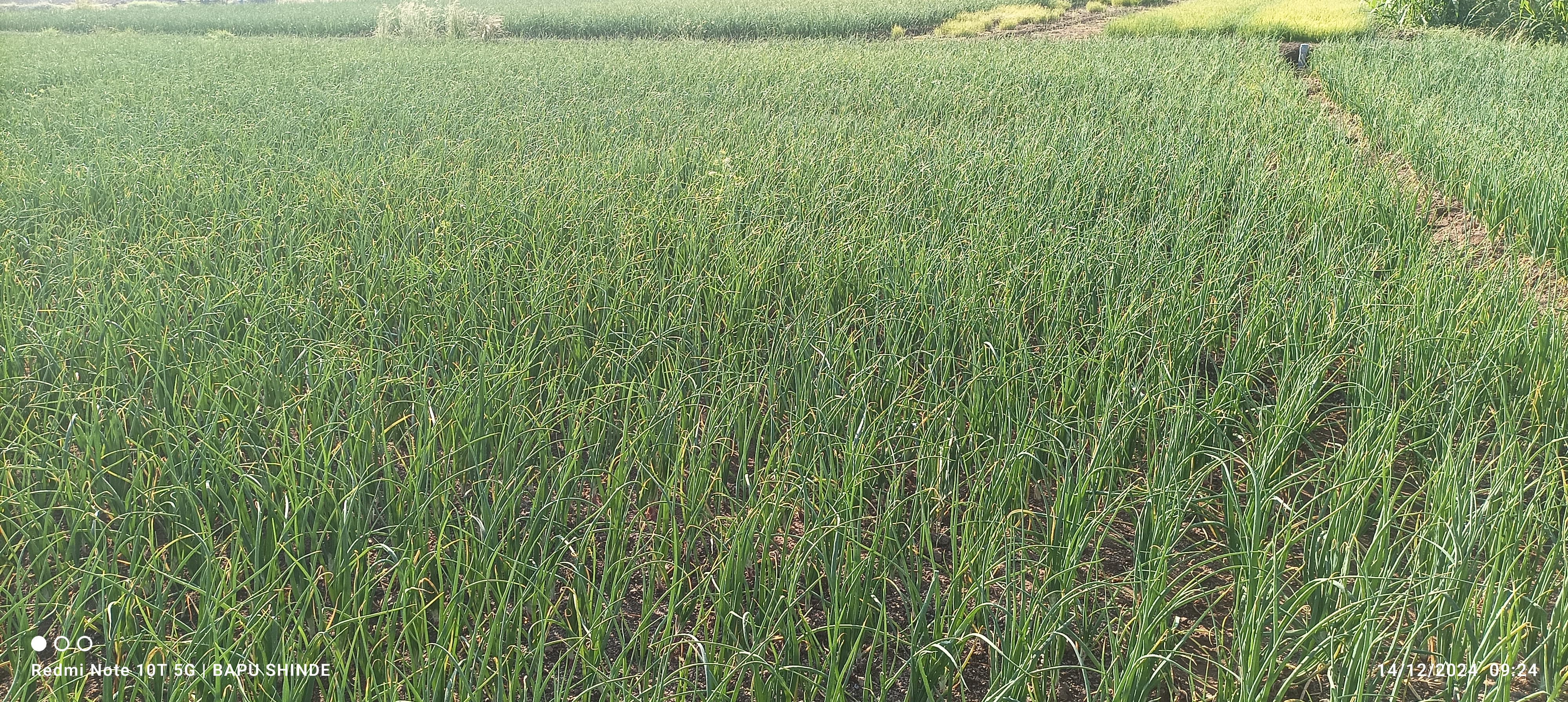
Landscape view of onion cultivation at Lasalgaon

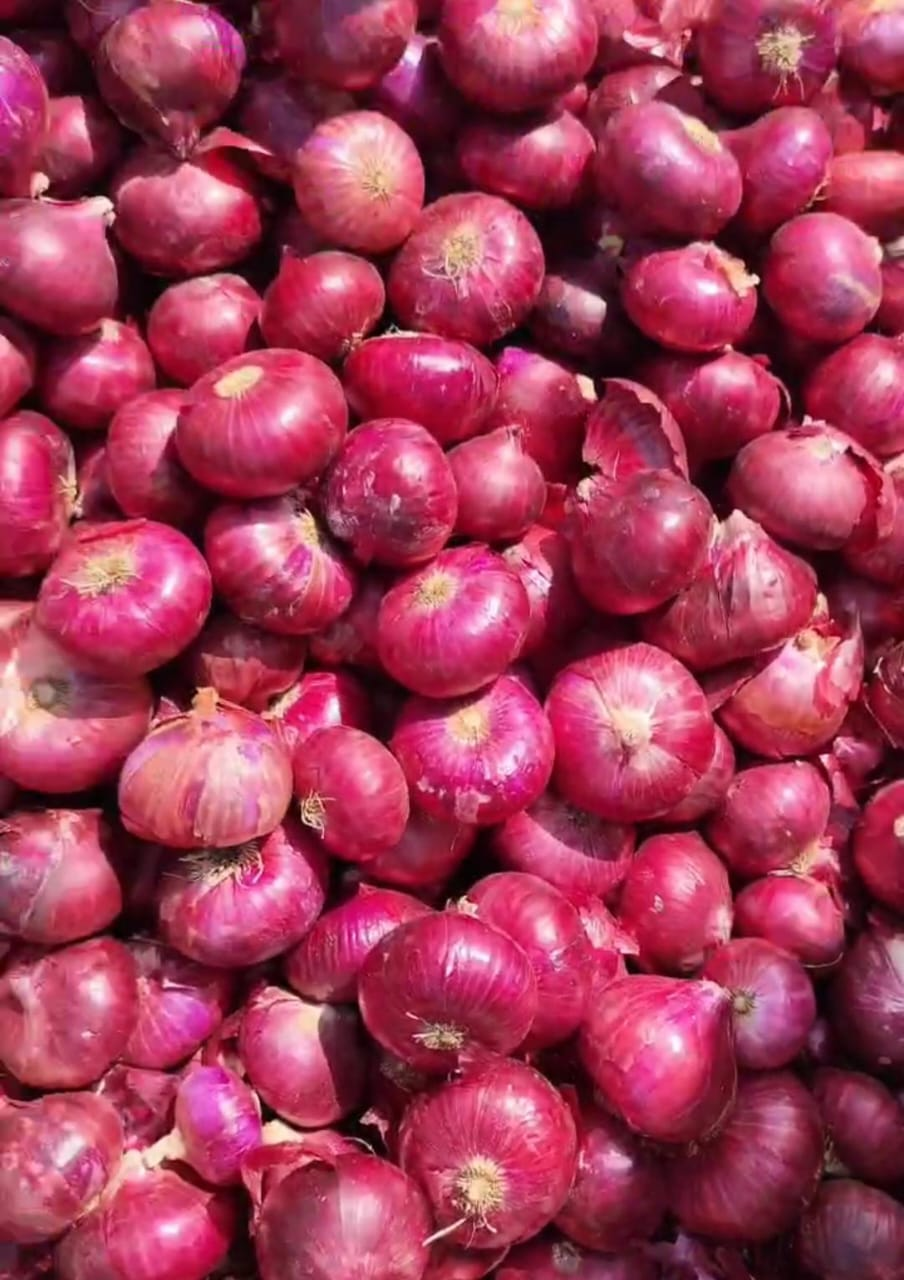
Closeup view of onion collection

== Geographical indication ==
It was awarded the Geographical Indication (GI) status tag from the Geographical Indications Registry, under the Union Government of India, on 31 March 2016 and is valid until 28 November 2031.

Baliraja Shetkari Gat from Lasalgaon, proposed the GI registration of Lasalgaon onion. After filing the application in November 2021, the onion was granted the GI tag in 2023 by the Geographical Indication Registry in Chennai, making the name "Lasalgaon onion" exclusive to the Onion grown in the region. It thus became the second onion variety from India after Bangalore rose onion of Karnataka and the 17th type of goods from Maharashtra to earn the GI tag.

The GI tag protects the onion from illegal selling and marketing, and gives it legal protection and a unique identity.

== See also ==
- Alibag White onion
- Bangalore rose onion
