= Byadagi chilli =

Chilli variety grown in Karnataka, India

Byadgi chilli
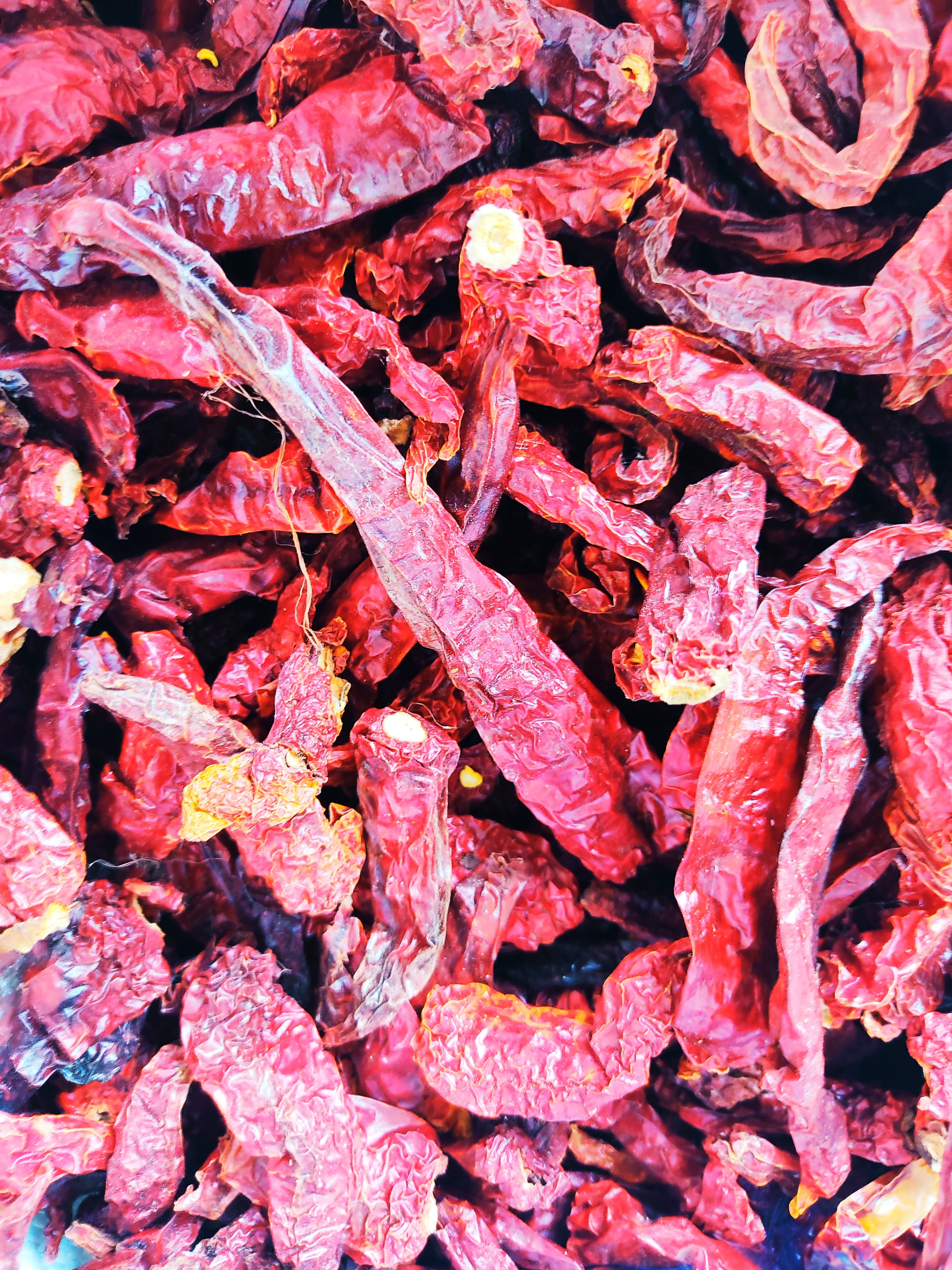
- Species: Capsicum annuum
- Origin: Karnataka, India
- Heat: mild to hot
- Scoville scale: 5,000 - 15,000 SHU

Byadagi chilli (Kannada: ಬ್ಯಾಡಗಿ ಮೆಣಸಿನಕಾಯಿ) is a variety of chilli mainly grown in the Indian state of Karnataka. It is named after the town of Byadgi which is located in the Haveri district of Karnataka. It is sometimes written as Bedgi in some supermarkets and grocery stores in India. The business involving Byadagi chillis has the second-largest turnover among all chilli varieties of India. An oil, oleoresin, extracted from these chillies is used in the preparation of nail polish and lipstick. Byadagi chilli is also known for its deep red colour; it is less spicy and is used in many food preparations of South India. Byadagi chilli has been accorded Geographical Indication (GI) in February 2011. Its GI tag is 129.

Byadagi chillies come in two types: dabbi and kaddi. Byadagi dabbi, which is small and plump, is more popular for its colour, flavour and taste. Though it has more seeds, it is less spicy compared to the kaddi variety. This variety is best suited for masala preparation and oleoresin extraction. Many established food companies prefer this variety for their products. Among cosmetic products, it is mainly used in nail polish and lipstick. The kaddi type is gnarled, thin, long and has fewer seeds.

== Characteristics ==
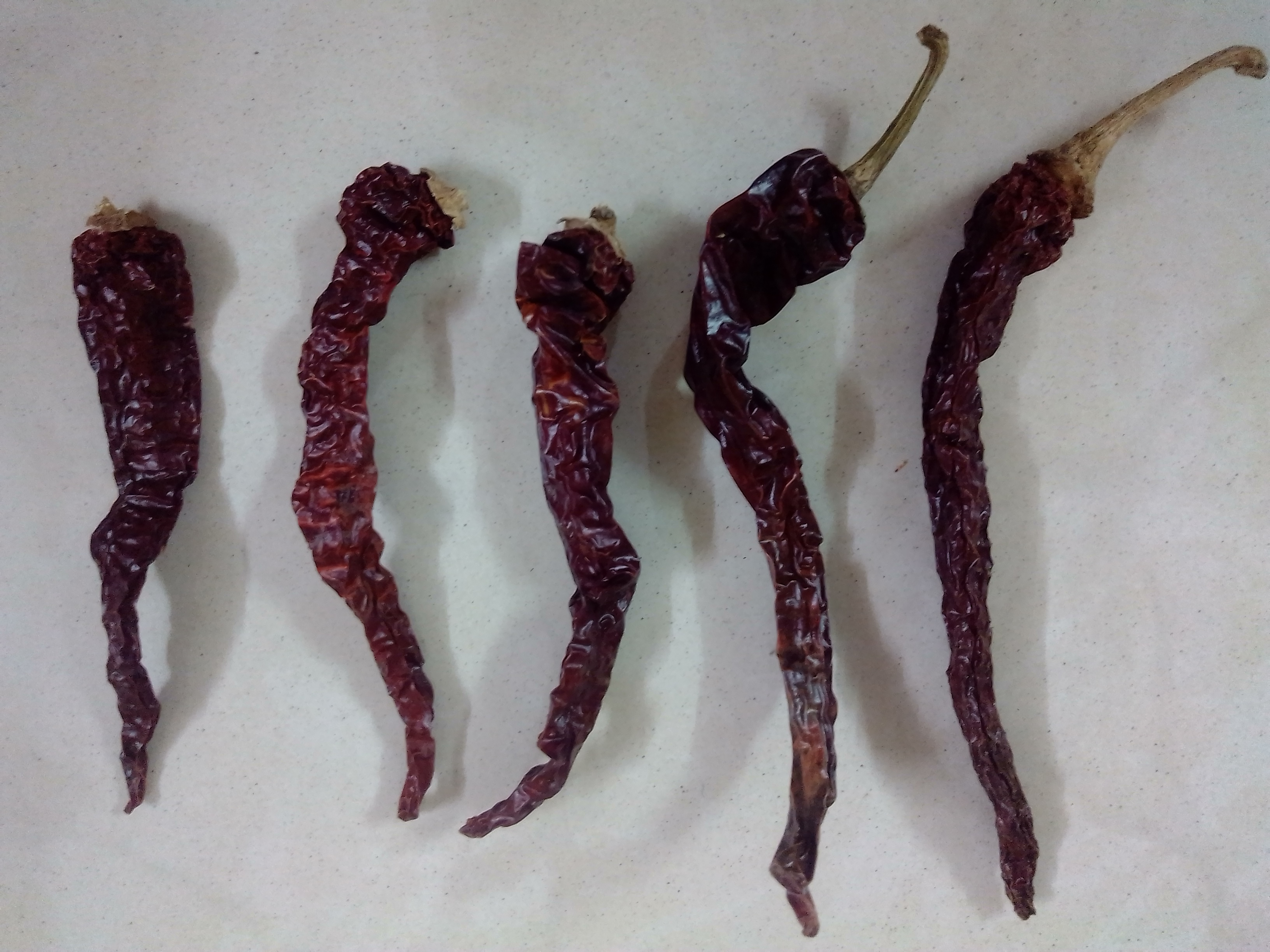

Byadagi Chilli plants begin flowering 40 days after transplantation although the majority of flowers bloom 60 to 80 days after transplanting. The chilli pods are harvested from January to May. The annual production of Byadagi Chilli is around 21,000 kg. The quality of chilli varieties is measured in terms of the extractable red colour pigment; this colour is measured in ASTA colour units. Byadagi Chilli has an ASTA colour value of 156.9. The higher the ASTA colour unit, the better the quality of chilli and therefore the higher the price. The Byadagi chilli has negligible capsaicin content making it less pungent than other chilli varieties.

== Uses ==
=== Cuisine ===
Byadagi chilli is an important ingredient in spicy preparations like bisi bele bath, sambar, chutneys and other food items of South India and is widely used in the Udupi cuisine. It is also used in meat preparations because of the bright red colour that it imparts to the meat. 25 industries in and around Byadagi are involved in grinding these chillies into powder and selling them to masala manufacturers like MTR Food Products.

=== Oleoresin ===
Earlier Byadagi Chilli was grown mainly to use it in food items as a spicy ingredient but recently, it has also been grown for the extraction of oleoresin, a red oil from the pods. Oleoresin is used in the preparation of nail polish and lipsticks. The extraction of oleoresin has also led to the creation of cold storage units in Byadagi since the chilli pods have to be maintained at a low temperature of 4 to 6-degrees Celsius to maintain the colour and purity. Storing in cold storage units also increases the amount of oleoresin extracted from chilli by about 30–40%. About 50 litres of oleoresin can be extracted from about 1 tonne of Byadagi chillies. Companies have been set up in and around Byadagi that are involved in the extraction of oleoresin. This oleoresin is then sent to Kerala where it is further refined before being exported to countries like the US, Japan and those in Europe.

== Business ==
Byadagi chillies are primarily sold at the Byadagi APMC chilli market; annual sales are about Rs. 30 billion ($361 million). This market attracts traders from all over Karnataka and from neighbouring Andhra Pradesh because of favourable conditions for the business like a fair price, immediate payment and accurate measurement of the chillis. The recent increase in sales of low-priced, more-pungent chilli varieties in the market has caused a decrease in the price of Byadagi chillies as well. Because of this, the farmers involved in its cultivation may not be able to make the required profits on their yield.

== See also ==
- Bangalore rose onion
- Coorg orange
- Dharwad pedha
- Mattu gulla
- Navalgund durries
