= Nanjanagud banana =

Edible fruit cultivar

- Geographical indication
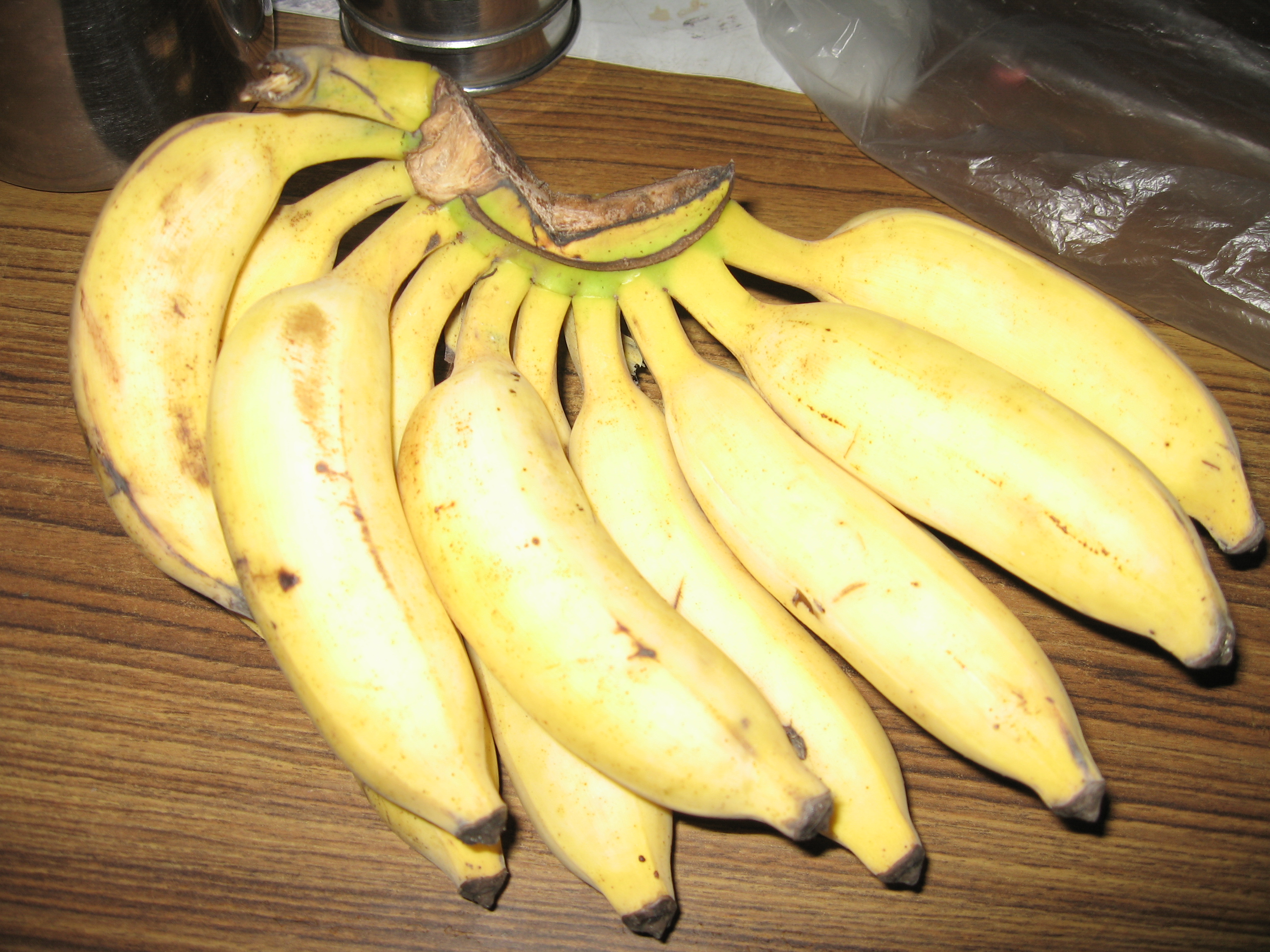
- Nanjangud rasabalehannu a special variety of banana
- Alternative names: Nanjangud rasabalehannu
- Area: Mysore & Chamrajnagar
- Country: India
- Registered: 2005

The Nanjangud banana (Nanjanagudu rasabale) is a variety of banana from Nanjangud, Mysore district, Karnataka, India. This fruit has a unique taste and aroma, and is locally popular. It has been given Geographical Indication Tag Number 29.

== Agriculture ==
Nanjangud banana cultivation requires specific soil conditions and climate, and it is mostly grown in the village of Devarasanahalli near Nanjangud. The region's traditional farming practices and natural environment are critical to maintaining banana quality. Black saline alluvial soil naturally formed on the banks of the Kapila is required. Experts believe that the secret of this taste and aroma lies in its genes.

== Description ==
Nanjangud bananas are often used in traditional festivals and religious ceremonies. This banana also brings significant economic benefits to the local farmers. The GI tag helps protect the authenticity of the banana. The fruit is small in size and buttery soft to eat. It is usually eaten without the peel. As it cannot be grown in foreign areas, its availability is less and hence there is a good demand for it. They are available at banana market in Sargur, Mysore district, Karnataka, India. Recently, due to the heavy use of chemical fertilizers, its taste, shape, and aroma are changing.

The size of the Nanjangud banana is smaller than other bananas. It is 5 to 8 cm long, and the diameter of the middle tube part of the fruit is 2 to 3 cm. Its peel is thin. When organic, Nanjangud bananas are well-ripened, the peel is eaten with the fruit, or the peel is eaten separately (raw or as a vegetable).

=== Geographical Indication ===
The Horticulture Department of the Government of Karnataka obtained a patent for the Nanjangud banana under the Geographical Indications (Geographical Indications) Act, 1999. The Controller General of Designs and Trademarks Office granted trademark rights to the Nanjangud banana and its products to Mysore farmers. It was granted Geographical Indication registration in 2005.

== See also ==
- Bangalore Blue
- Byadagi chilli
- Coorg green cardamom
- Coorg orange
- List of Geographical Indications in India
- Mattu gulla
