= Bangalore Blue =

Noir grape variety

- Grape (Vitis)
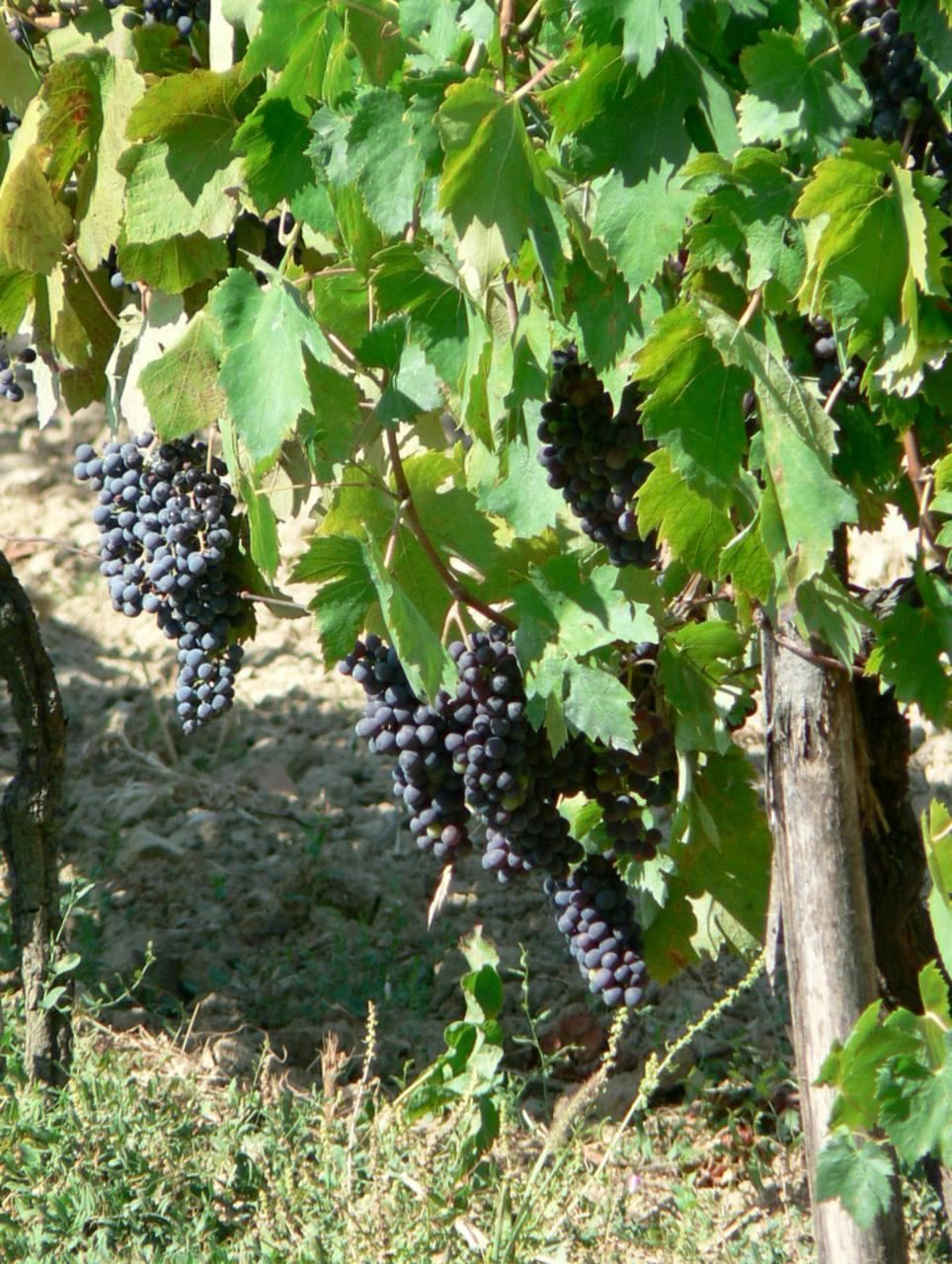
- Color of berry skin: Noir
- Species: Vitis labrusca
- Also called: Isabella
- Notable regions: Bangalore Urban, Chikkaballapur district, Kolar district

Bangalore blue grape, also simply called Bangalore Blue, is a variety of fox grape (Vitis labrusca) grown in districts around Bangalore in India. It is one of the three major varieties of grape in the state of Karnataka (the other two being Thomson seedless and Anab-E-Shahi Dilkush). It received a geographical indication tag from the Government of India in 2013.

== History ==
The variety has been grown for the past 150 years in the districts of Bangalore Urban, Chikkaballapur and Kolar. It is cultivated exclusively in an area of about 5,000 hectares, mainly in the Nandi Valley; and about 450,000 tonnes of the fruit are produced annually.

== Appearance and uses ==
Bangalore Blue is closely related to the American Concord variety which has a strong natural resistance against phylloxera bugs. The variety has a "foxy flavor" and a soft skin.

The ideal conditions needed to grow Bangalore Blue are: soil of red sandy loam type, day temperature of 35 °C to 37 °C and night temperature of 12 °C to 15 °C. As these conditions are found around the Bangalore region, the variety is grown exclusively there.

The grape is mainly used for raw consumption, making jams and jellies, juice and juice concentrates; and in fortified wines.

== Geographical indication ==
The Department of Horticulture proposed the registration of Bangalore Blue under the Geographical Indications of Goods Act, 1999, to the Office of the Controller-General of Patents, Designs and Trademarks, Chennai, in order to make it exclusive to the farmers in the region and increase its brand value. It was granted the Geographical indication status, three years later, in 2013. This allowed the Bangalore Blue Grapes Growers' Association headquartered in Chikkaballapur to get patent rights to cultivation of the variety.

== See also ==
- List of Geographical Indications in India
