= Mattu gulla =

Variety of green brinjal

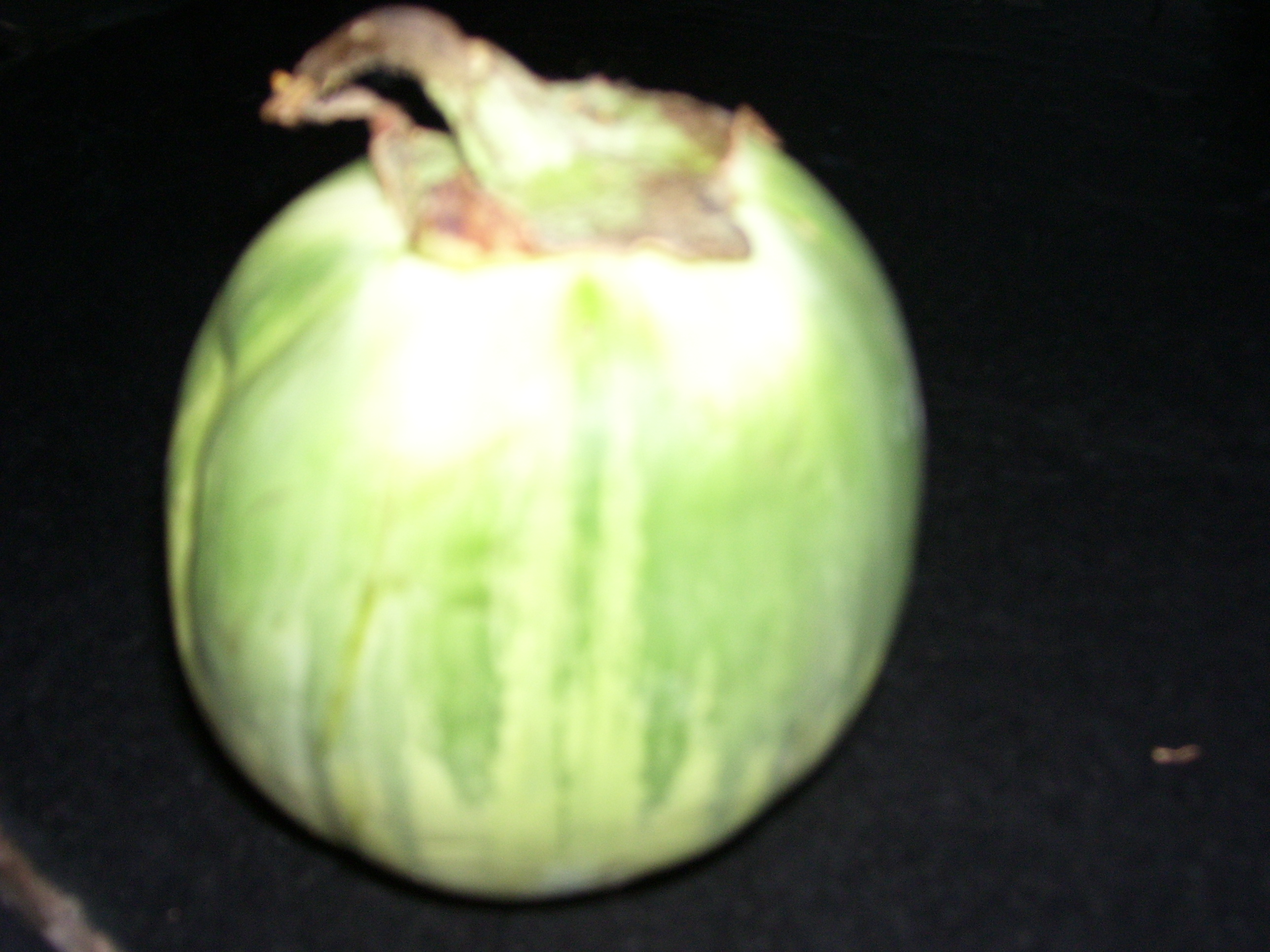
Udupi Mattu Gulla

Mattu gulla, or Udupi gulla, is a variety of green brinjal grown in and around the village of Mattu in Udupi, India. It was given the Geographical Indication tag in 2011.

== Description ==
Mattu gulla is said to have been grown for 400 years in Matti, with a legend linking its origins to Sri Vadiraja Tirtha of Sode Vadiraja Matha, Udupi. It was cultivated within an area of more than 500 acres between the Udyavar river and Swarna River. Apart from Matti, it is grown in surrounding villages like Pangala, Kopla and Kaipunjal. The land on which it is grown is enriched with fish meal manure.

Mattu gulla is green in colour, unlike the purple brinjals grown in other places. As the word "gulla" indicates, it is spherical in shape. It is a seasonal vegetable which is grown after the monsoon season from the months of September and October. It has low moisture content and is known for its unique taste. Mattu gulla is a widely used vegetable in Udupi cuisine especially the sambar. Mattu gulla obtained the Geographical Indication tag in 2011 for its unusual and unique taste and exclusive location of production.

The production of Mattu gulla decreased in recent years due to various reasons such as pest attacks and advent of genetically modified brinjal. According to the Department of Horticulture, it was grown in an area of 67 hectares in 2015, with an approximate yield of 40 tonnes per hectare.

== See also ==
- List of Geographical Indications in India
