= Coorg orange =

Edible fruit cultivar

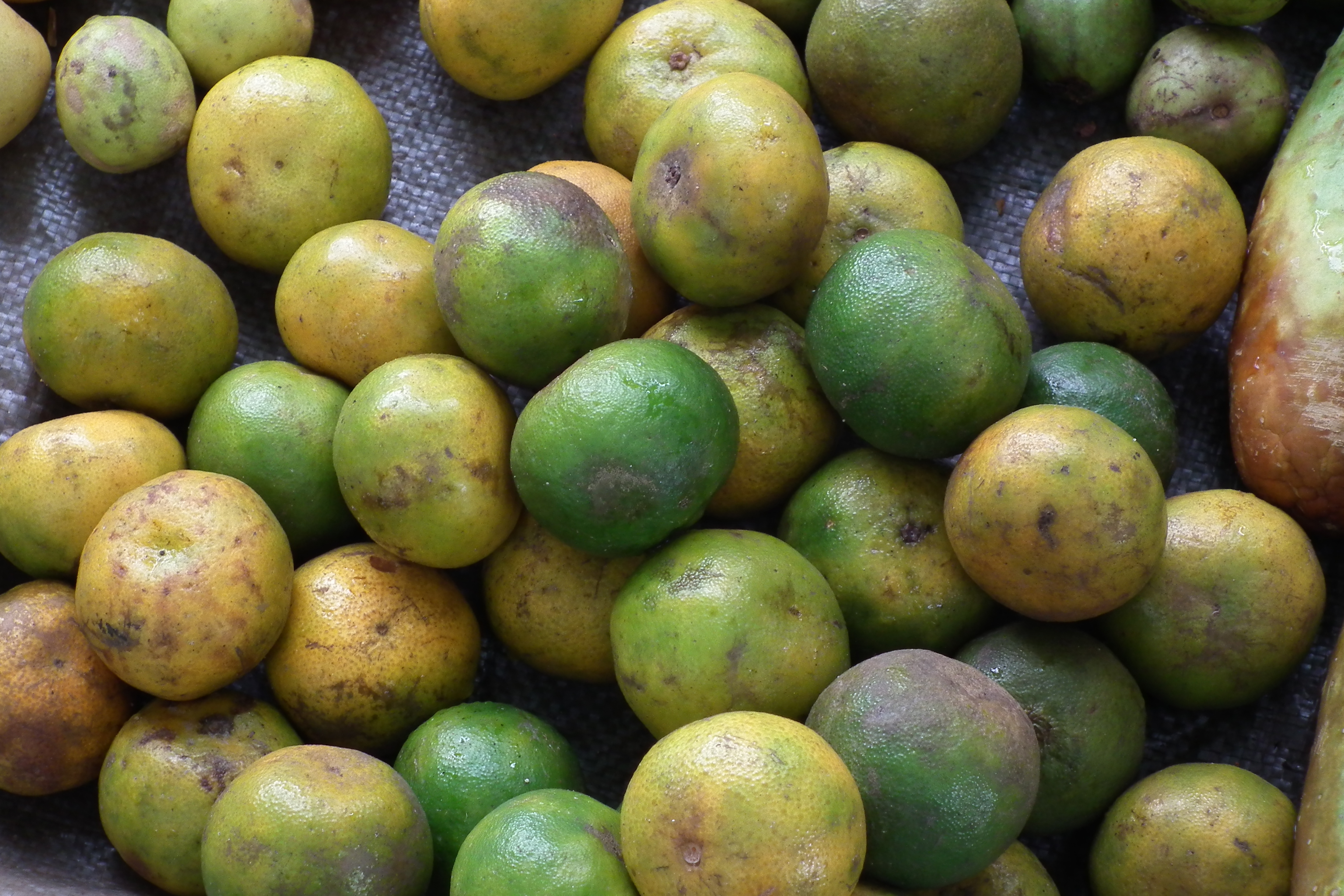
Coorg oranges

Coorg orange, also called Coorg mandarin, is a cultivar of orange from Kodagu in Karnataka, India. It was given the Geographical Indication status in 2006.

== Description ==
In the 1960s, Coorg orange was grown in land of 24,000 hectare area. In recent years the cultivation area has come down to less than 2,000 hectares. Coorg orange was mainly cultivated in the districts of Kodagu, Hassan and Chikmagalur as a secondary crop in coffee plantations for more than 150 years.

Coorg oranges are regarded as man-made hybrids of mandarins (Citrus reticulata). Greenish-yellow in colour, they have a tight skin and a sweet-sour taste, unlike Nagpur oranges which are known to have loose skin and sweet taste. Coorg oranges are said to have longer shelf life compared to other varieties. The hilly terrain with well-drained soil and heavy rainfall in the region of cultivation are regarded as the reasons for the unique characteristics of this variety.

Coorg orange cultivation has decreased in recent years due to diseases, emergence of Nagpur orange, among other factors. The yield of each plant has come down to around 10kg which was once more than 50kg. The average production of the fruit is over 45,000 tonnes.

== See also ==
- Coorg green cardamom
- List of Geographical Indications in India
