= Areca alkaloids =

Chemical compound found in plants

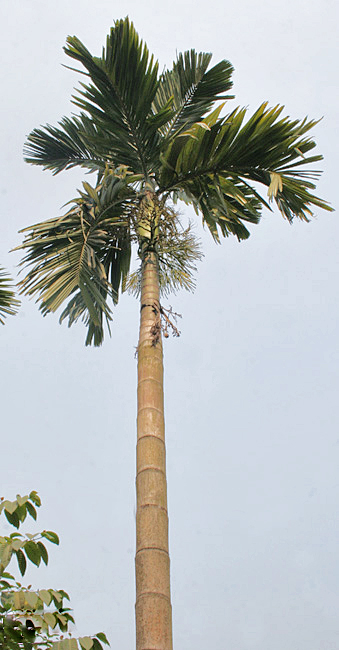
Areca catechu

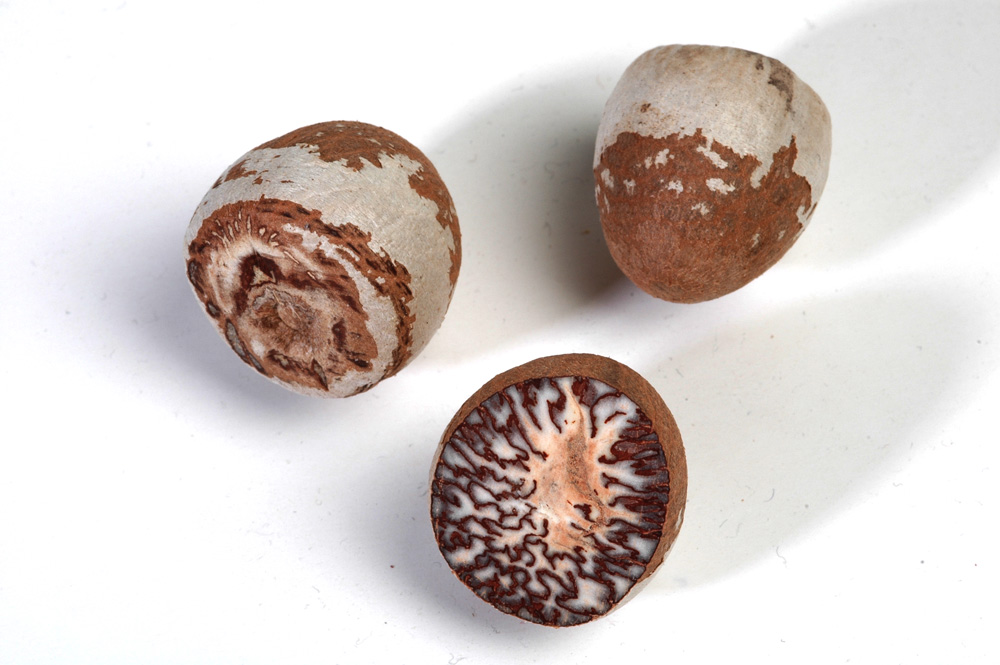
Carved areca nuts from India

Areca alkaloids are a group of tetrahydropyridine stimulant alkaloids found in the areca nut, the seeds of the areca palm (Areca catechu).

== Occurrence ==
Areca alkaloids are isolated from the areca nut, which are hemispherical seeds and are approximately 3 cm in size. Areca nuts are cultivated in India and East Asia.

== Chemistry ==
The main alkaloid is arecoline, which accounts for over 50% of the total alkaloid content in betel quid. Other representatives include arecaidine, guvacoline, and guvacine.

Arecoline

Arecaidine

Guvacoline

Guvacine

The total alkaloid content of the nuts increases during ripening and decreases upon subsequent drying. Toasting and drying the nuts increases the ratio of arecoline in the total alkaloid content.

== Properties ==
Arecolin is a potent parasympathomimetic that enhances salivary and sweat secretion and stimulates intestinal activity. The vermifuge function of areca preparations is used today only in veterinary medicine. Traditionally, areca nut has been used as an aphrodisiac, anorectic, digestive stimulant, and diuretic, as well as in the treatment of asthma, cough, dermatitis, fainting, glaucoma, erectile dysfunction, parasitic worm diseases, leprosy, toothache, and vaginal discharge, as well as to constrict the vagina.

Areca nuts are typically chewed with calcium hydroxide (hydrated lime) and leaves of betel pepper, especially in East Asia (known as "sirih pinang"). This practice stimulates the nervous system in a manner akin to tobacco.
