= Areca nut production in India =

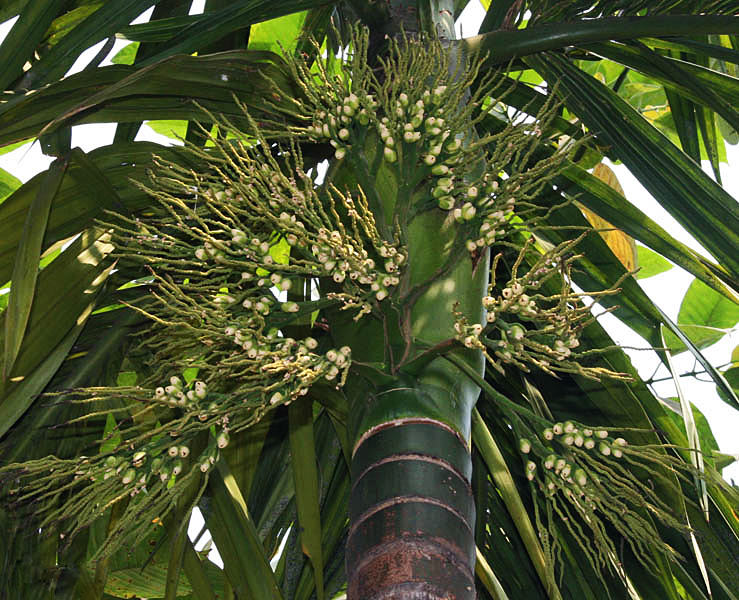
Supari Palm or Betelnut (Areca catechu). Kolkata, West Bengal.

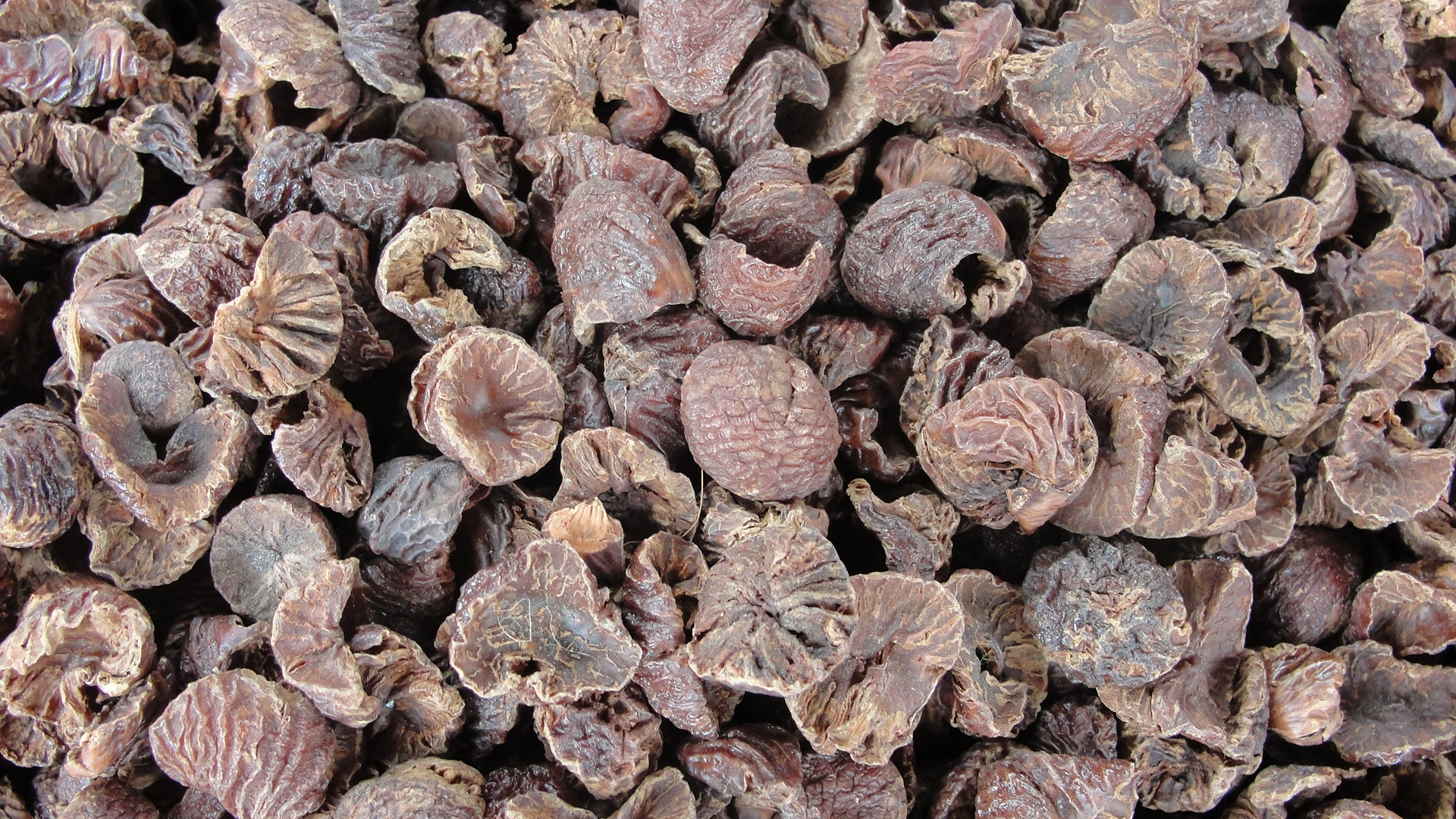
Dried areca nut or betel nut

Areca nut production in India is dominant in the coastal region within 400 kilometres (250 mi) from the coast line, and also in some other non-coastal states of India. Areca nut (Areca catechu), a tropical crop, is popularly known as betel nut, as its common usage in the country is for mastication with betel leaves. It is a palm tree species under the family of Arecaceae. It has commercial and economic importance not only in India but also in China and Southeast Asia.

Areca nut production in India is the largest in the world, as per the Food and Agriculture Organization of the United Nations (FAO) statistics for 2017, accounting for 54.07% of its world output, and is exported to many countries. Within India, as of 2013–14, Karnataka produces 62.69% of the crop followed by Kerala and Assam; all three states together account for 88.59% of its production. In the other states of Meghalaya, Tamil Nadu, and West Bengal, where it is also consumed, the crop is grown in a very small area. In Karnataka, in the Uttara Kannada District and Shivamogga District the crop is grown extensively

== History ==
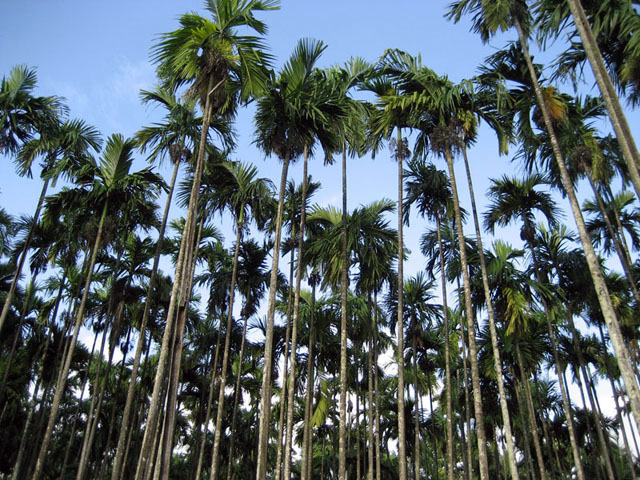
Arecanut plantation in Karnataka

Areca nut is not a native crop of India. It is generally believed to be native to Malaysia or Philippines where it is grown in many varieties. It is a tropical crop which grows from West Indies to the East Coast of Africa, and in Bangladesh, China, Sri Lanka and Malaya. The practice of chewing the areca nuts is attributed to Vietnam and Malaysia. It was from Southeast Asia that the crop spread to Asia and India where it is cultivated as a cash crop. It is conjectured that ancient Indian literature provide information on betel nut and its mastication. The Indian Ayurveda texts also refer to the areca nuts as a traditional medicine.

Its use in India is also noted from the pre-vedic period and was described by the word taamboola in ancient Indian civilization. It is extensively used in Hindu religious rites of birth, marriage, nuptial and is also offered to guests as a mark of hospitality. It is offered to gods in veneration in the form of taamboola, which consists of one areca nut placed over two betel leaves.

Areca nut is extensively used as a masticator in south and southeast Asian countries, chewed with or without betel leaves. However, in India it has a special ethno-religious importance.

== Varieties ==
In India there are two varieties of areca nut, also called supari in Hindi language. One is the white variety and the other is the red variety. The white areca nut is produced by harvesting the fully ripe nuts and then subjecting it to sun drying for about 2 months. In the red variety the green areca nut is harvested, boiled and then its exterior husk is removed. Sometimes Arecanut is even grounded in the soil for fermentation purpose to enhance the taste preferably called as "Mojha Tamul" in Assam.

== Production ==
Top 10 Areca nut Producing States in India (2019–20)
Rank	State	Area ('000 ha)	Production ('000 tonnes)
1	Karnataka	218.01	457.56
2	Kerala	100.01	100.02
3	Assam	68.04	89.00
4	Meghalaya	17.11	24.68
5	West Bengal	11.39	21.16
6	Mizoram	10.14	6.05
7	Tamil Nadu	6.7	8.62
8	Tripura	4.7	9.92
9	Andaman & Nicobar Islands	4.23	5.88
10	Maharashtra	2.2	3.58

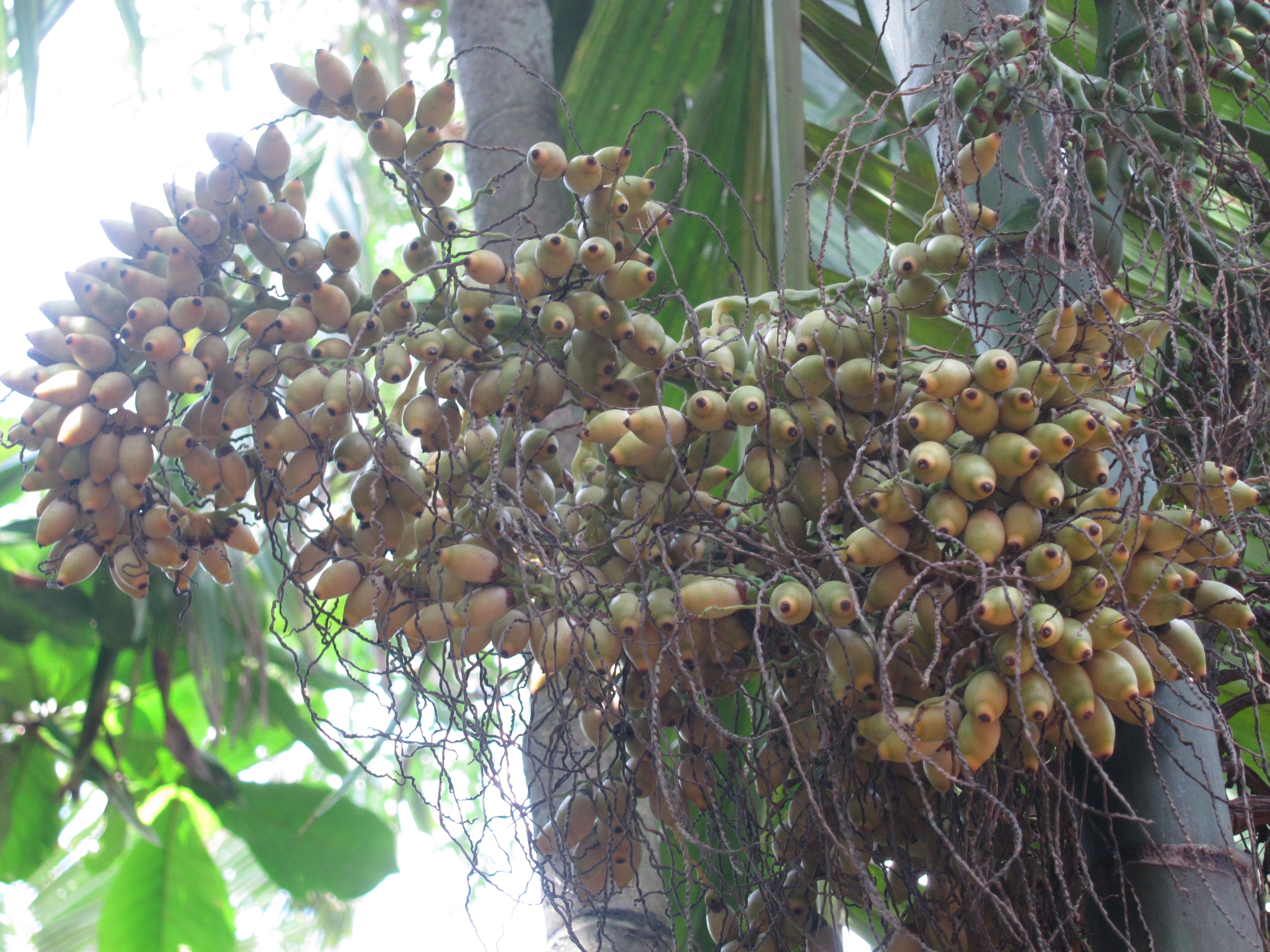
Areca Nut in Mysore, Karnataka.

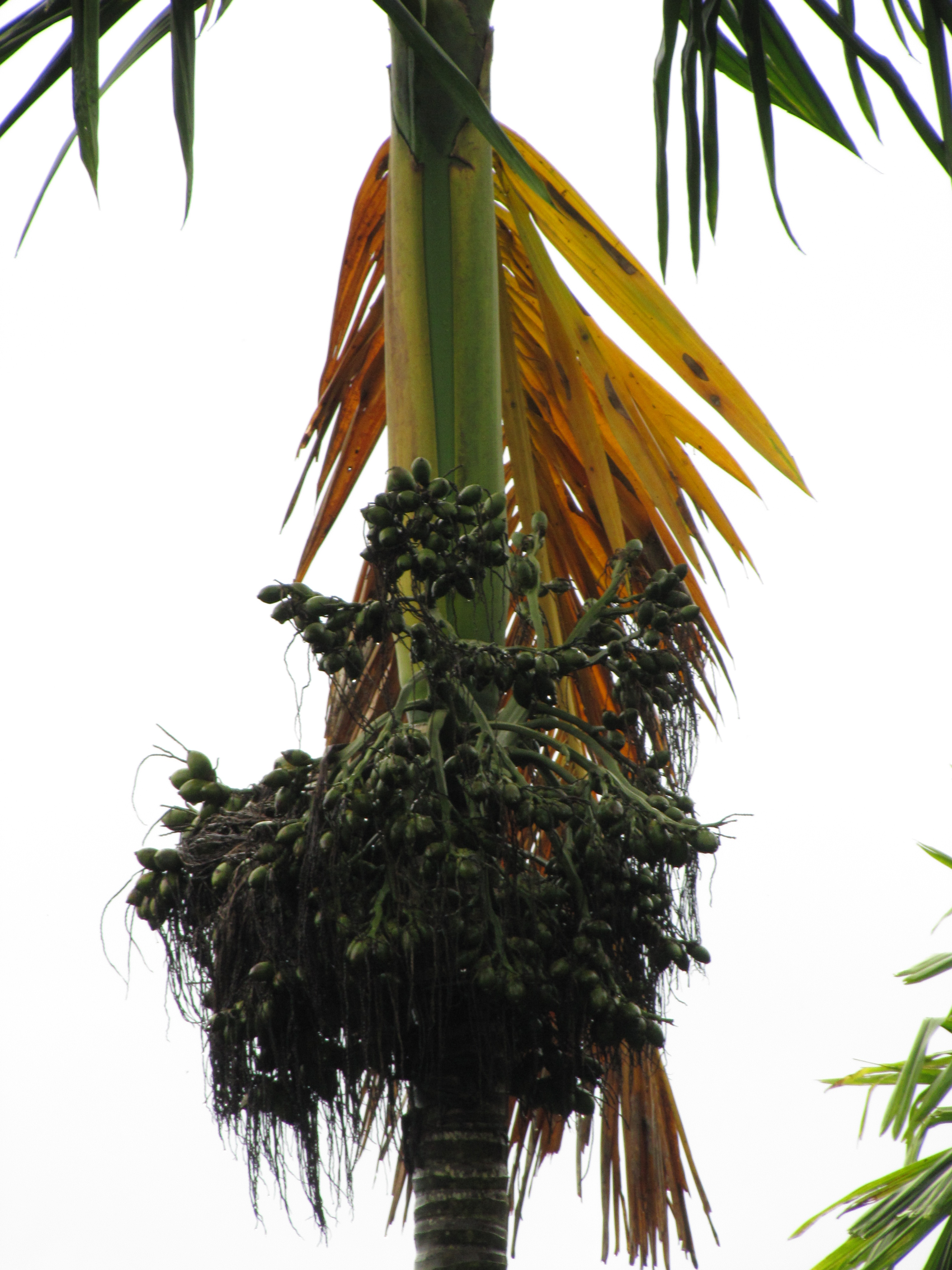
Areca nut stem, sheaths and fruit bunches

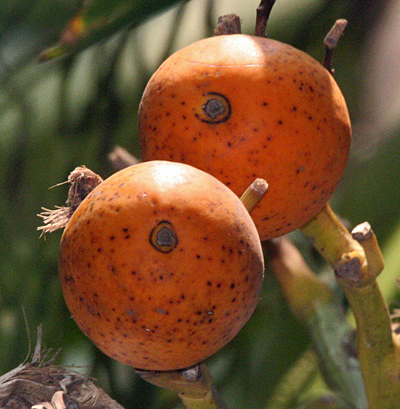
The areca nut fruit

In 1990–91 the area under areca nut plantation was 208,400 hectares (515,000 acres) and production was 249,300 tonnes. During 2013–14 its production was 729,810 tonnes from an area of 445,000 hectares (1,100,000 acres). In Karnataka, which leads the country in its production its production was 4,57,560 tonnes from an area of 218,010 hectares (538,700 acres). The details of state wise area and production are given in the Table for ten states.

Areca nut, as a maritime species, is grown in areas of up to 400 kilometres (250 mi) inland from the coast of India at an elevation below 1,000 metres (3,300 ft). But its yield at higher elevations is not economical. Extreme climatic conditions, particularity of temperature, are not suitable for its growth; it thrives in areas with temperature range of 14–36 °C (57–97 °F). It also grows in areas in Kerala and West Bengal where the temperature varies from a minimum of 4 °C (39 °F) to a maximum of 40 °C (104 °F). Good rainfall conditions are essential for its growth, say a well distributed annual rainfall of more than 2,250 millimetres (89 in). In well drained soils it can with stand rainfall of 4,000 millimetres (160 in) for its growth. Where the rainfall is less, as in the case of Tamil Nadu with incidence of rainfall of about 750 millimetres (30 in), irrigation facilities are mandatory. During the process of drying of the whole fruits or processed nuts sunshine requirement varies from 7 to 45 days.

The plant grows in well drained, deep clay loamy soil; laterite, red loam and alluvial soils are considered most suitable. Areca nut farming, to achieve good yield, needs large application of organic manures and chemical fertilizers.

The gestation period for the areca nut tree to yield fruits varies from four to eight years. Its life span is up to 60 years and in some cases even 100 years. Pollination takes place due to the effect of wind. The tree bears small creamy white flowers which have a strong scent. The fruit grows to a ripening stage in about 8 months. The tree bears bunches of fruits which are plucked manually.

The type of diseases affecting the areca nut plant are: bud-rot, mahali (fruit-rot), yellow leaf disease, which need to be tackled by chemical spraying.

Irrigation is an essential requirement (once a week) along with the land drainage throughout the year. Irrigation water is drawn from rivers or wells using pump sets.

The chemical composition of areca nut comprises 14 to 15% of fat, polyphenols, tannins, alkaloids, polysaccharides, a small amount of protein, and vitamin B6 and vitamin C. The fat, which is extracted by using organic solvents, is made up of mastic acid and its byproducts. The fat is mixed in a certain proportion with cocoa butter or coconut oil, which is then used to make confectioneries and duplicate dairy products.

The polyphenol (tannins) content varies from 38 to 47% in tender nuts and 15 to 22% in ripe nuts. Tannin, which is extracted from the nut, is used in foods as natural colouring agent, and also in the leather industry. Other minor constituents in the areca nut alkaloids, in terms of the total weight of the nut, is about 1.6%, which are comprise arecoline, arecolodine, arecaidine, guvacine, isoguvacine, and govacolidine; the pharmacological and other uses of these alkaloids are as "antihelminithic, ophthalmic, antibacterial, antidiabetic."

Areca nut husk is used to make many industrial products such as hardboard, insulation wool, cushions, paper, paper board and activated carbon. The chemical composition of the areca husk consists of 18.75% furaldehyde which when distilled produces 5.5% furfural; it also yields xylitol.

Areca leaf sheaths are used to make ply-boards. Other miscellaneous uses of leaf sheath are to make caps, eating bowls, vessels to keep palm wine, and artifacts.

In the past, plantation farmers practiced inter-cropping to make themselves safe economically, as the gestation period of the areca nut plant before it started yielding nuts was very long. It was also subject to plant diseases and pests. Natural disasters and inaccessible locations also added to the problem. However, with improvements in management practices, with better marketing facilities and good infrastructure and cooperatives, inter cropping is less practiced.

Areca nut cultivation is carried out according to farm management practices after studying different cost concepts. Costs include the value of hired human labour and hired and owned animal labour. As the nut is harvested five to six times in a year labour costs are high.

The areca nut tree grows as a single stem, and has generally a height of about 30 metres (98 ft). The fruit, which bears the nut, is orange coloured and is in the shape of an egg or oval shape; it holds a hard single seed.

== Uses ==
Areca nut and the plant as a whole is used widely in India and South Asia as: a masticator for chewing purposes, vegetable, medicine, stimulant, timber, fuel wood, clothing, wrapping, lubricant, tannin and so forth. The nut is chewed with the betel leaf as it has a stimulating effect.

== Bibliography ==
- Giriappa, S. (1 January 1994). Arecanut Production and Marketing in India. M.D. Publications Pvt. Ltd. ISBN 978-81-85880-45-7.
- Pramank, A. K. (1 January 2004). Accounting and Management : In Theory and Practice. Deep & Deep Publications. ISBN 978-81-7629-476-8.
- Tejwani, K G (1 January 2002). Agro Forestry In India. Concept Publishing Company. ISBN 978-81-7022-918-6.
