= C7H11NO2 =

The molecular formula C_{7}H_{11}NO_{2} (molar mass: 141.17 g/mol, exact mass: 141.0790 u) may refer to:

- Arecaidine
- Ethosuximide
- Guvacoline
- Hypoglycin A
