= Arecoline =

Stimulant alkaloid responsible for mouth cancers

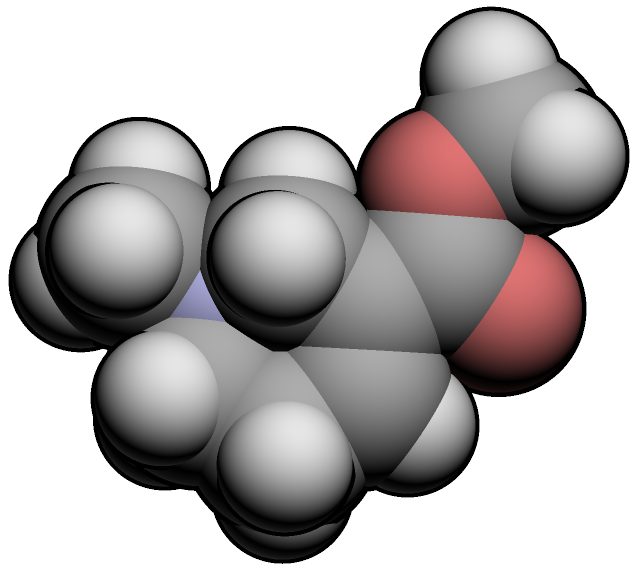

Clinical data
- Pronunciation: /əˈrɛkəliːn/
- Other names: Arecaline; Arecholine; Arecolin; Arecoline base; Arekolin; Methylarecaidin
- Routes of administration: Oromucosal (chewing without swallowing)
- Drug class: Cholinergic; Muscarinic agonist; Nicotinic agonist; Stimulant; Euphoriant
- ATC code: None

Legal status
- Legal status: AU: S4 (Prescription only); UK: Could be illegal to sell for human consumption under the Psychoactive Substances Act or if is synthetized for recreational use; US: Unscheduled

Pharmacokinetic data
- Metabolism: Hydrolysis (via carboxylesterase), N-oxidation, N-demethylation (via CYP450), hydrogenation, and mercapturic acid conjugation
- Metabolites: Arecaidine, arecoline-N-oxide, guvacoline, N-methylnipecotic acid methyl ester, arecoline mercapturic acid, others

Identifiers
- IUPAC name: Methyl 1-methyl-1,2,5,6-tetrahydropyridine-3-carboxylate
- CAS Number: 63-75-2
- PubChem CID: 2230
- IUPHAR/BPS: 296
- DrugBank: DB04365
- ChemSpider: 13872064
- UNII: 4ALN5933BH
- KEGG: C10129
- ChEBI: CHEBI:2814
- ChEMBL: ChEMBL7303
- CompTox Dashboard (EPA): DTXSID3022617
- ECHA InfoCard: 100.000.514

Chemical and physical data
- Formula: C_{8}H_{13}NO_{2}
- Molar mass: 155.197 g·mol^{−1}
- 3D model (JSmol): Interactive image
- Density: 1.0495 g/cm^{3}
- Melting point: 27 °C (81 °F)
- Boiling point: 209 °C (408 °F)
- SMILES: O=C(OC)C=1CN(C)CCC=1
- InChI: InChI=1S/C8H13NO2/c1-9-5-3-4-7(6-9)8(10)11-2/h4H,3,5-6H2,1-2H3; Key:HJJPJSXJAXAIPN-UHFFFAOYSA-N

Arecoline is a cholinergic agent, stimulant, and naturally occurring alkaloid found in areca (betel) nuts of the areca palm (Areca catechu) found in South and Southeast Asia. Its effects, depending on the dose, include stimulation, alertness, increased concentration, cognitive enhancement, elation, euphoria, pro-sexual effects, relaxation, reduced anxiety, and sedation, as well as addiction and withdrawal symptoms upon discontinuation. Its effects are described as subtle and it has been likened to a strong cup of coffee. There are also other active constituents of areca nuts, but arecoline is the key active component, with a percentage of ~0.3 to 0.6%. Areca nuts are administered by chewing for 5 to 20 minutes without swallowing.

Side effects of arecoline include hypersalivation, hypotension, vertigo, miosis, tremor, and bradycardia, among others. Other adverse effects can include extrapyramidal syndrome and seizures. Addiction and dependence can occur, with withdrawal symptoms including mood swings, anxiety, irritability, and insomnia. Rarely, psychosis can occur during withdrawal in heavy users. Areca nut use, the primary method of consuming arecoline, is highly associated with oral disease and oral cancer. Overdose of arecoline can be treated with antimuscarinic drugs like atropine or scopolamine.

The drug acts as a non-selective partial agonist of muscarinic and nicotinic acetylcholine receptors. The major metabolite of arecoline, arecaidine, is a GABA reuptake inhibitor. The subjective effects of arecoline appear to be mediated by muscarinic acetylcholine receptors and not by nicotinic acetylcholine receptors based on animal studies. However, its mechanism of action is still yet to be fully understood and other activities have also been described. The stimulant and addictive effects of arecoline are thought to be due to increased dopaminergic neurotransmission in the mesolimbic pathway of the brain. In terms of chemical structure, arecoline is closely related to nicotinic acid.

The use of arecoline, in the form of areca nuts, dates back several thousand years, including in Thailand, China, and Polynesia. Arecoline was first isolated in 1888 by Ernst Jahns and its synthesis was first proposed in 1891, with its chemical structure confirmed in 1907. The first complete synthesis was reported by Fritz Chemnitius at Jena University (Germany) in 1926. Arecoline, in the form of areca nuts, is used by more than 600 million people worldwide (~10–20% of the global population), and is the fourth most commonly used psychoactive drug in the world after alcohol, nicotine, and caffeine. Despite globalization, arecoline is unusual among recreational drugs in that its use is still predominantly confined to Asia, though its use has been increasing and spreading in part due to the Internet. Chewing areca nuts is said to be as familiar to various Asian peoples as chewing gum is to Americans. The countries in which areca nut production are highest include India, China, Myanmar, Malaysia, Indonesia, and Bangladesh. Arecoline and areca nut sale and consumption are not generally controlled throughout the world, with a few exceptions.

== Uses ==
=== Recreational ===
In many Asian cultures, the areca nut is chewed along with betel leaf to obtain a stimulating effect.

=== Medical ===
Arecoline has been used medicinally as an antihelmintic (a drug against parasitic worms). It paralyzes tapeworms.

=== Traditional medicine ===
Arecoline has been used in traditional medicine in Asia for thousands of years.

== Adverse effects ==
=== Overdose ===
The LD_{50} of arecoline is 100 mg/kg, when administered subcutaneously in mice. The minimum lethal dose (MLD) values of arecoline in mice, dogs, and horses is 100 mg/kg, 5 mg/kg and 1.4 mg/kg respectively.

=== Toxicity ===
Current science is confident that areca nut chewing is carcinogenic. Research suggests this is probably at least partly because of arecoline itself, although it could also be from the other constituents of the nut as well, some of which are precursors to nitrosamines that form in the mouth during chewing. Section 5.5 Evaluation on page 238 of IARC Monograph 85-6 states the following:

- [...]
- There is sufficient evidence in humans for the carcinogenicity of betel quid without tobacco. Betel quid without tobacco causes oral cancer.
- There is sufficient evidence in experimental animals for the carcinogenicity of betel quid without tobacco.
- There is sufficient evidence in experimental animals for the carcinogenicity of betel quid with tobacco.
- There is sufficient evidence in experimental animals for the carcinogenicity of areca nut.
- There is sufficient evidence in experimental animals for the carcinogenicity of areca nut with tobacco.
- There is limited evidence in experimental animals for the carcinogenicity of arecoline.
- There is inadequate evidence in experimental animals for the carcinogenicity of arecaidine.
- [...]

The toxicity of arecoline can be partially mitigated by vitamins C and E in mice.

==== Mechanisms of toxicity ====
Arecoline is "obviously cytotoxic" to cultures of hepatocytes, bone marrow cells, lymphocytes, neuronal cell, myoblasts and endothelial cells.

Arecoline generates excessive reactive oxygen species (ROS) in a number of cell types, including oral epithelial cells and neuronal cells. In adult mice, arecoline is toxic to the testes and liver via ROS generation.

Arecoline is also genotoxic, being able to induce DNA damage and mutation in several cell cultures. Mice chronically exposed to arecoline show relaxation of their chromatin structure.

== Pharmacology ==
=== Pharmacodynamics ===
Arecoline is the primary active ingredient responsible for the central nervous system effects of the areca nut. Arecoline has been compared to nicotine; however, nicotine agonizes nicotinic acetylcholine receptors, whereas arecoline is primarily a partial agonist of muscarinic acetylcholine receptors, leading to its parasympathetic effects. In frogs, arecoline also acts as an antagonist (or very weak partial agonist) at α4 and α6-containing nicotinic acetylcholine receptors and as a silent antagonist at α7 nicotinic receptors, which may account for its anti-inflammatory activity. Arecoline also inhibits AMPK through generation of ROS in several types of cells.

AN (Areca Nut) is a vasodilator mainly due to the presence of arecoline. It also has anti-thrombosis and anti-atherogenic effects by increasing plasma nitric oxide, eNos, and mRNA expression and decreasing IL-8 along with other downregulations. It increases the level of testosterone by stimulating Leydig's cells as well as levels of FSH and LH. It also activates HPA axis and stimulates CRH release. It prevents the dysfunction of B cells of the pancreas from high fructose intake. Arecoline has the ability to stimulate the digestive system through the activation of muscarinic receptors. Areca nut water extract could increase the contractions of gastric smooth muscle and muscle strips of the duodenum, ileum, and colon significantly. This activity could be caused by arecoline.

=== Pharmacokinetics ===
Arecoline is metabolized by both kidneys and liver. Currently, 11 metabolites of arecoline are documented among which N-methylnipecotic acid was found to be a major metabolite of both arecoline and arecaidine. Lime, which is traditionally mixed to crushed areca nuts prior to consumption, is said to hydrolyse almost all arecoline to arecaidine, a GABA reuptake inhibitor. Arecaidine is also formed during liver metabolism of arecoline in rats.

Arecoline is very efficiently absorbed through oral musoca, with 85% bioavailbility. Maximum plasma concentration is reached within 3 minutes.

Orally ingested arecoline is extensively metabolized in rats, with the vast majority of the dose being converted to arecaidine and arecoline N-oxide.

== Chemistry ==
Arecoline is a colorless odorless oily liquid. It is a base, and its conjugate acid has a pK_{a} ~ 6.8. Arecoline is volatile in steam, miscible with most organic solvents and water, but extractable from water by ether in presence of dissolved salts. Being basic, arecoline forms salts with acids. The salts are crystalline, but usually deliquescent: the hydrochloride, arecoline•HCl, forms needles, m.p. 158 °C; the hydrobromide, arecoline•HBr, forms slender prisms, mp. 177–179 °C from hot methanol; the aurichloride, arecoline•HAuCl_{4}, is an oil, but the platinichloride, arecoline_{2}•H_{2}PtCl_{6}, mp. 176 °C, crystallizes from water in orange-red rhombohedrons. The methiodide forms glancing prisms, mp. 173–174 °C.

=== Synthesis ===
2024 method: Also see:

The double Michael reaction between methyl acrylate [96-33-3] (1) and aqueous methylamine (2) gave N,N-Bis(-methoxycarbonylethyl)methylamine [105-71-5] (3). Dieckmann cyclization led to 1-Methyl-3-carbomethoxy-4-piperidone [13221-89-1] (4). The reduction of the ketone group with sodium borohydride gave N-Methyl-3-carbomethoxy-4-hydroxypiperidine, PC3029557 (5). Reaction with methanesulfonyl chloride followed by addition of hydrobromic acid completed the synthesis of arecoline hydrobromide (6). N.B. compound #4 is similar to a compound used in the synthesis of GSK1360707F.

Synthesis: Chinese:

Fischer esterification of nicotinic acid (niacin) (1) gives methyl nicotinate (2). Alkylation with methyl iodide then gives 3-methoxycarbonyl-1-methylpyridinium iodide (3). Hydride reduction with an agent such as potassium borohydride thus gives the tetrahydropyridine (4). Salt formation with HBr completes the synthesis (5).

Secondary method:

A double Mannich reaction between methylamine (1), acetaldehyde (2) and formaldehyde (3) in the presence of hydroxylamine hydrochloride is supposed to have delivered 1-methyl-1,2,5,6-tetrahydropyridine-3-carbaldehyde oxime hydrochloride (4) as the product. Dehydration of the aldoxime to the nitrile occurs upon treatment with acetic anhydride giving 3-cyano-1-methyl-1,2,5,6-tetrahydropyridine (5). Functional group interconversion of the nitrile to the methyl carboxylate ester then occurs upon acid-catalyzed treatment in methanol, and then conversion to the HBr salt completes the synthesis. N.B. Although the first step is not very high yielding, if one substitutes methoxyamine for hydroxylamine procedure could be used for a one-pot synthesis of milameline.

=== Chemical precursor ===
Arecoline is used in the synthesis of a variety of other drugs, including paroxetine, femoxetine, nocaine, DMNPC, piquindone, PC10058081 (epiboxidine type), FT-0731096 [114724-56-0], piper-brasofensine piper-Tesofensine and BRN 0023391 [102206-67-7].

=== Analogues ===
Analogues of and related compounds to arecoline include arecaidine, guavacoline, guvacine, nipecotic acid, nicotinic acid, muscarine, SKF-89976A, tiagabine, and CI-966. Xanomeline, the anti-schizophrenia component in the approved drug xanomeline/trospium chloride, also has structural similarities to arecoline.

== Research ==
Owing to its muscarinic and nicotinic agonist properties, arecoline has shown improvement in the learning ability of healthy volunteers. Since one of the hallmarks of Alzheimer's disease is a cognitive decline, arecoline was suggested as a treatment to slow down this process. Arecoline administered intravenously did indeed show modest verbal and spatial memory improvement in Alzheimer's patients, though due to arecoline's possible carcinogenic properties (see § Toxicity), it is not the first drug of choice for this degenerative disease.

Anecdotal reports indicate that it has a short-lived effect against schizophrenia. Among male schizophrenia patients, higher areca nut consumption is associated with weaker symptoms. It inspired the development of xanomeline. It enhances learning and memory in rodents.

== Veterinary use ==
In 2012, Chinese Ministry of Agriculture listed arecoline hydrobromide as an abolished veterinary drug and stopped its production and use.
