= Pinang scissor =

Tool for cutting betel nuts

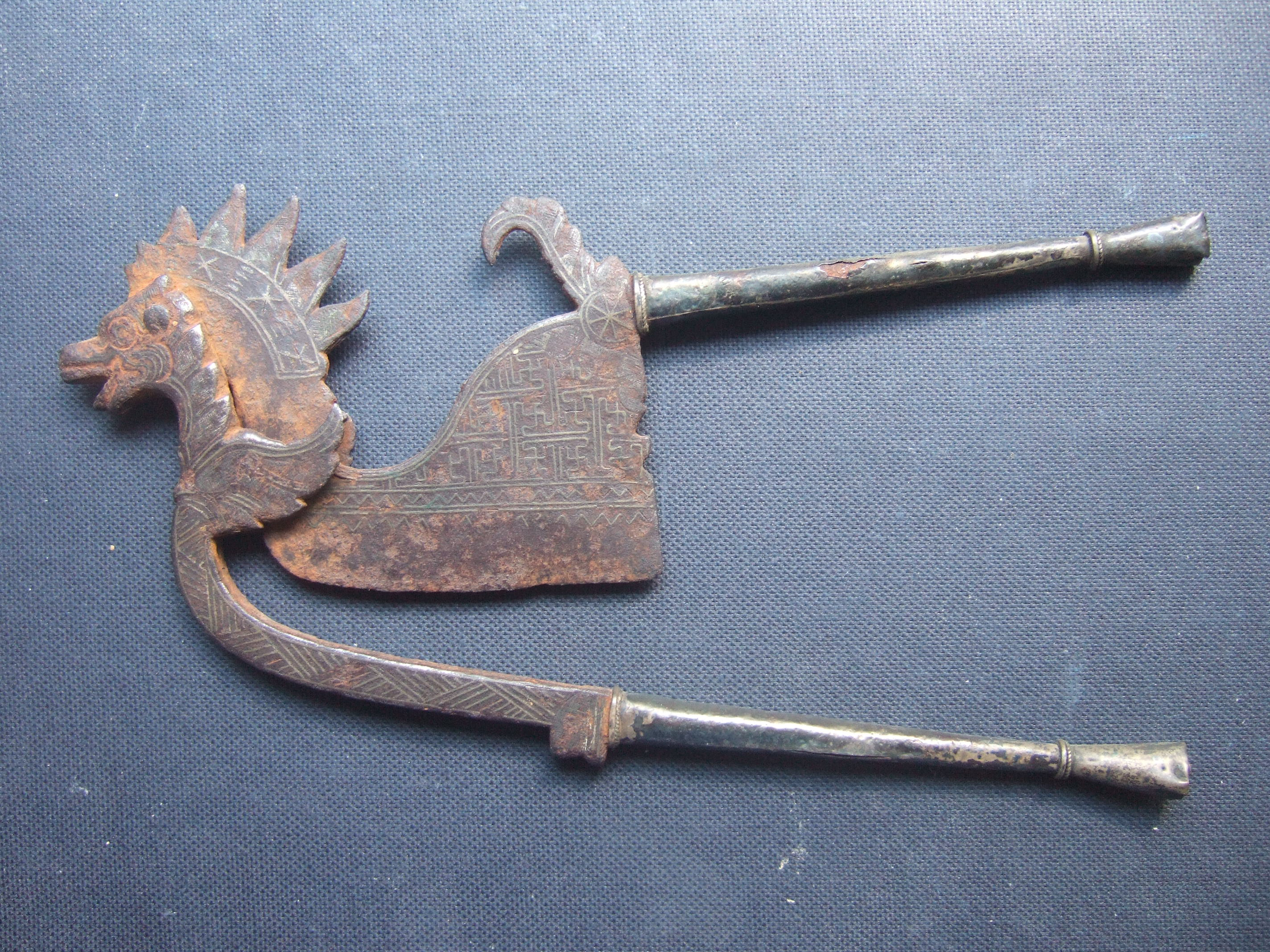
Betel nut cutter, Indonesia

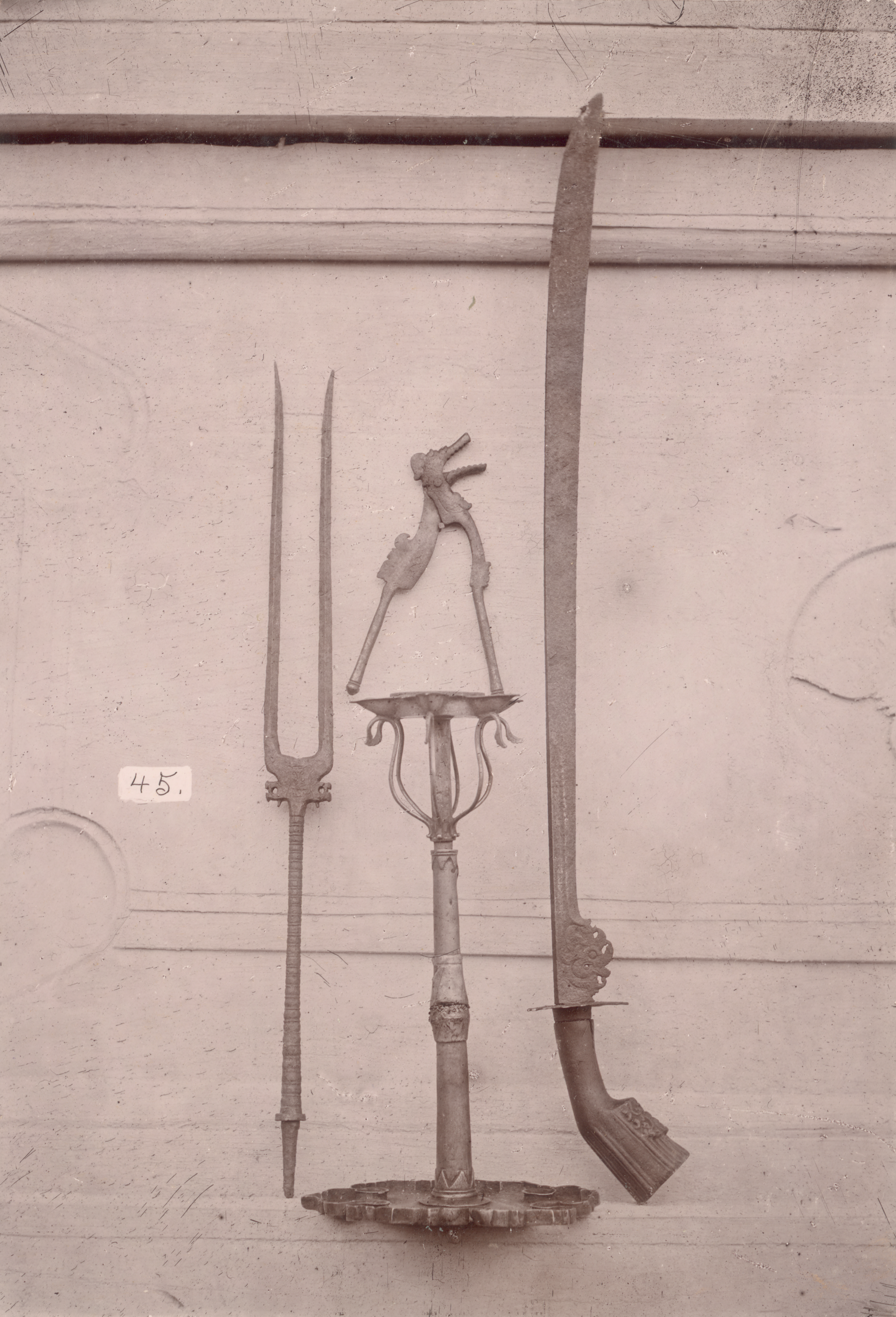
Objects including pinang scissors (upper middle) at "Panjaloe at Tjamis"

The pinang scissor or betel nut scissor (kalakati) is a type of scissor for cutting areca/betel nuts to be consumed common to Maritime Southeast Asia. It is a main component of the Malay container set (tepak sirih) equipped for this purpose.

These scissors can be made with sharp-angled ("male") or circular ("female") blades. The top can be decorated with shapes of animals like birds and horses. Smithing these scissors are more complicated than of krises and swords, it can take more than ten years to smith them perfectly.
