= Areca nut =

Fruit of the areca palm chewed as a stimulant

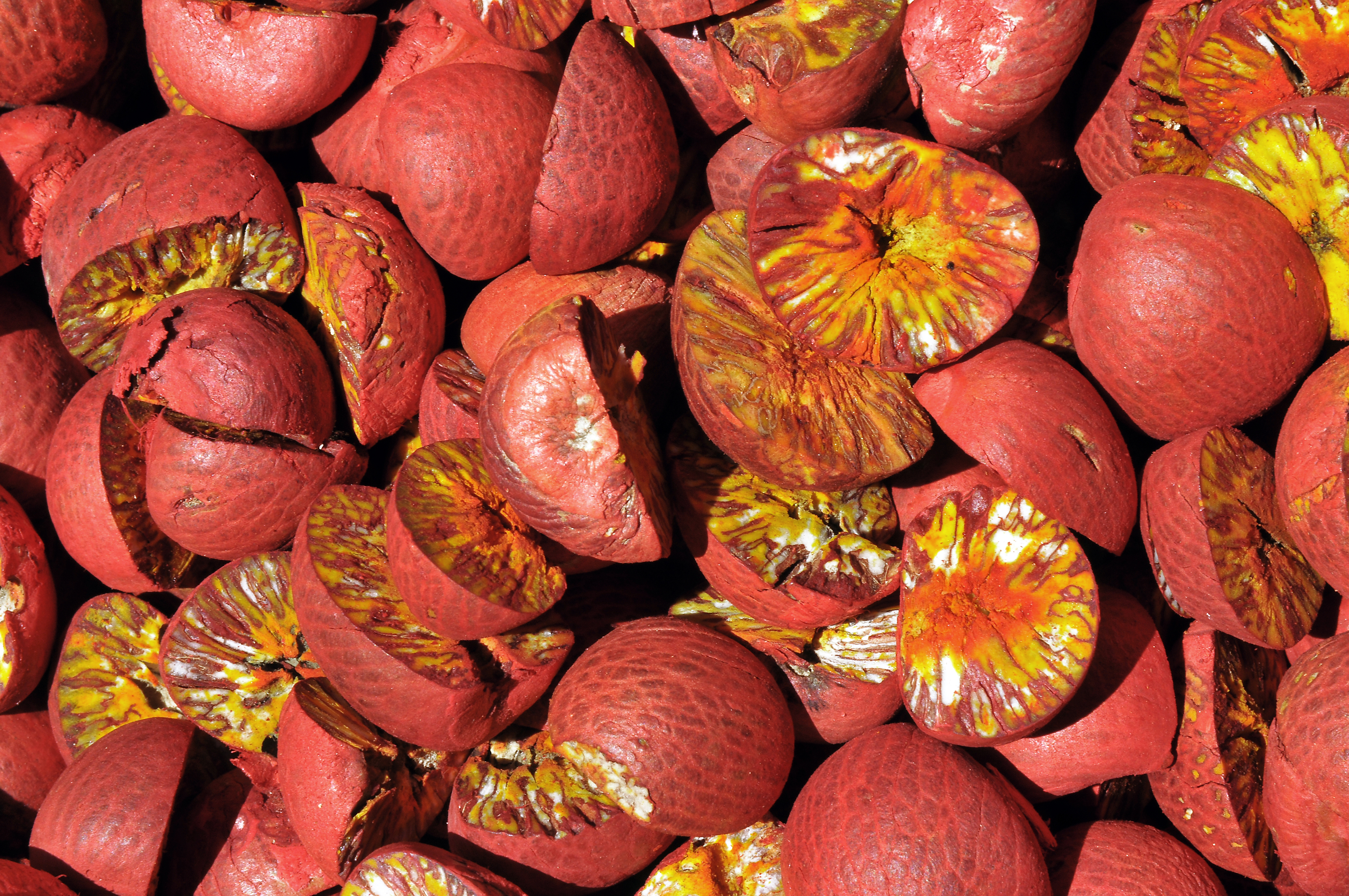
Areca nuts

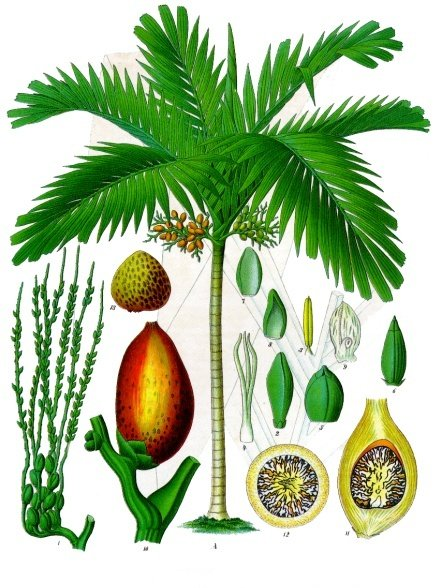
19th century drawing of the Areca palm and its nut

The areca nut, (Note: English: /ˈærɪkə/ or /əˈriːkə/) also called betel nut, (Note: English: /ˈbiːtəl/) is the seed of a palm belonging to the areca genus (Areca catechu). The palm is originally native to the Philippines, but was carried widely through the tropics by the Austronesian migrations and trade since at least 1500 BCE due to its use in betel nut chewing. It is widespread in cultivation and is considered naturalized in much of the tropical Pacific (Melanesia and Micronesia), South Asia, Southeast Asia, and parts of east Africa. It is not to be confused with betel (Piper betle) leaves that are often used to wrap it. The practice of betel nut chewing, often together with other herbs as a stimulant drug, dates back thousands of years, and continues to the present day in many countries.

Areca nut chewing is addictive due to the presence of areca alkaloids, primarily arecoline, and causes adverse health effects, mainly oral and esophageal cancers, as well as cardiovascular disease. When chewed with additional tobacco in its preparation (like in gutka), there is an even higher risk, especially for oral and oropharyngeal cancers. With tobacco it also raises the risk of fatal coronary artery disease, fatal stroke, and adverse reproductive effects, including stillbirth, premature birth, and low birth weight. Its consumption by around 600 million people worldwide, mainly of South and Southeast Asian origin, has been described as a neglected global public health emergency.

== Etymology ==
The term areca originated from Dravidian languages, cognates of which are:

- Malayalam: അടയ്ക്ക, romanized: aṭaykka
- Kannada: ಅಡಿಕೆ, romanized: aḍike
- Tamil: அடைக்காய், romanized: aḍaikkāy

The terms dates back to the 16th century, when Dutch and Portuguese sailors took the nut from India to Europe.

== Description ==
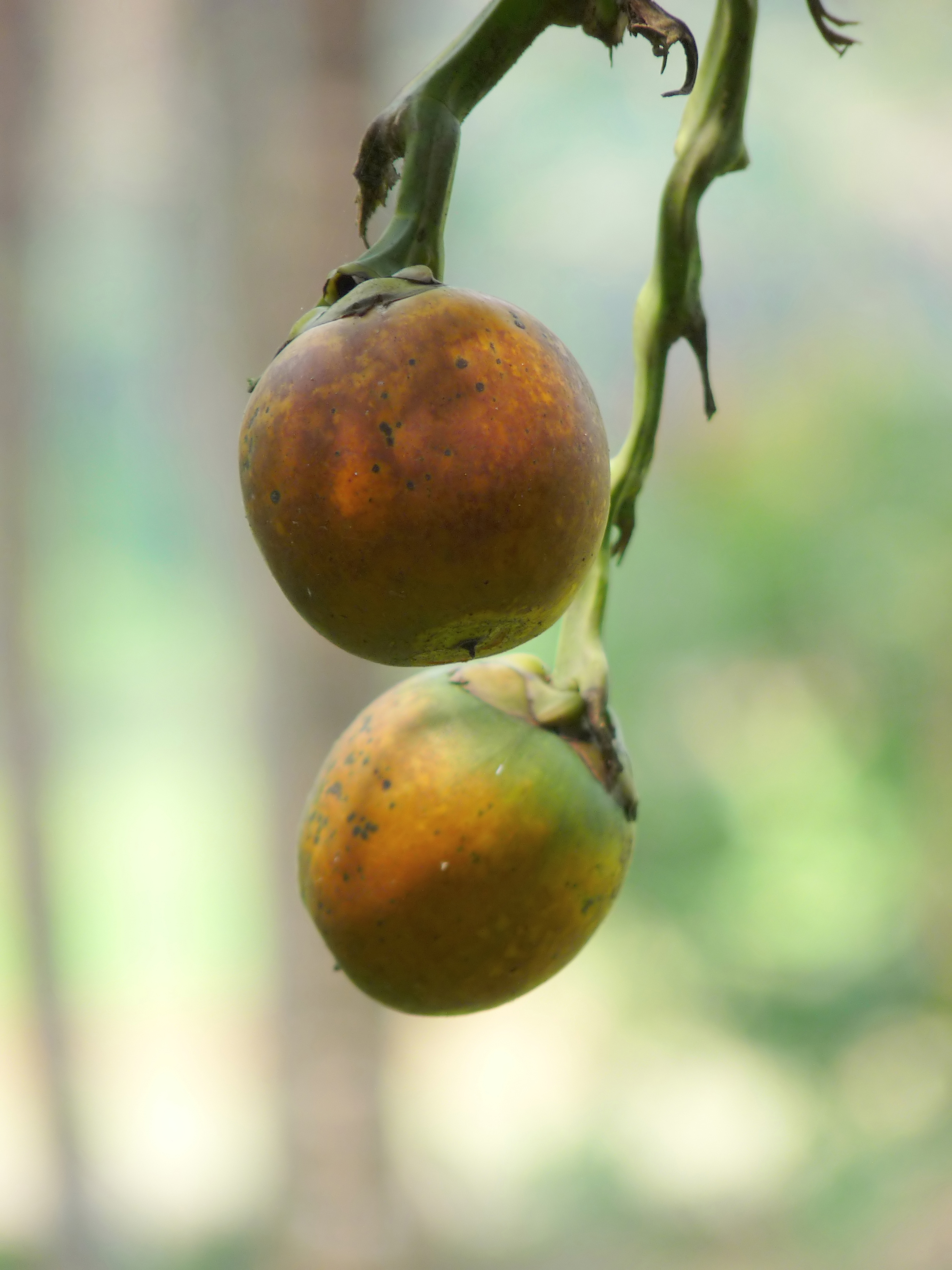
Areca fruits on a tree

The areca nut is not a true nut, but rather the seed of a fruit categorized as a berry. It is commercially available in dried, cured, and fresh forms. When the husk of the fresh fruit is green, the nut inside is soft enough to be cut with a typical knife. In the ripe fruit, the husk becomes yellow or orange, and as it dries, the fruit inside hardens to a wood-like consistency. Some regions that culturally consume the nuts have special scissor-like cutters or nippers able to slice through the husk at this stage.

Usually, for chewing, a few slices of the nut are wrapped in a betel leaf along with calcium hydroxide (slaked lime) and may include clove, cardamom, catechu resin (kattha), or other spices for extra flavouring. Betel leaf has a fresh, peppery taste, but it can also be bitter to varying degrees, depending on the variety.

Areca nuts are chewed for their effects as a mild stimulant, causing a warming sensation in the body and slightly heightened alertness, although the effects vary from person to person.

In parts of India, Sri Lanka, southern China, and Southeast Asia, areca nuts are not only chewed along with betel leaf, but are also used in the preparation of Ayurvedic and traditional Chinese medicines. Powdered areca nut is used as a constituent in some dentifrices. Other traditional uses include the removal of tapeworms and other intestinal parasites by swallowing a few teaspoons of powdered areca nut, drunk as a decoction, or by taking tablets containing the extracted alkaloids. According to traditional Ayurvedic medicine, chewing areca nut and betel leaf is a good remedy against bad breath. Diplomat Edmund Roberts noted that Chinese people would mix areca nut with Uncaria gambir during his visit to China in the 1830s. After chewing a betel nut, the red residue is generally spat out. Accordingly, places have banned chewing this nut to avoid eyesores.

=== Chemistry ===
The major alkaloid in betel nut is arecoline, a non-selective partial agonist of muscarinic and nicotinic acetylcholine receptors. There are other compounds, such as arecaidine, guvacine, isoguvacine, and guvacoline. Tannins present in betel nut are mainly proanthocyanidins along with catechins and arecatannin. Two new alkaloids were recently discovered and named acatechu A and acatechu B. Several non-alkaloid compounds including benzenoids, terpenes, carboxylic acids, aldehydes, alcohols, and esters were also identified.

== Toxicity ==
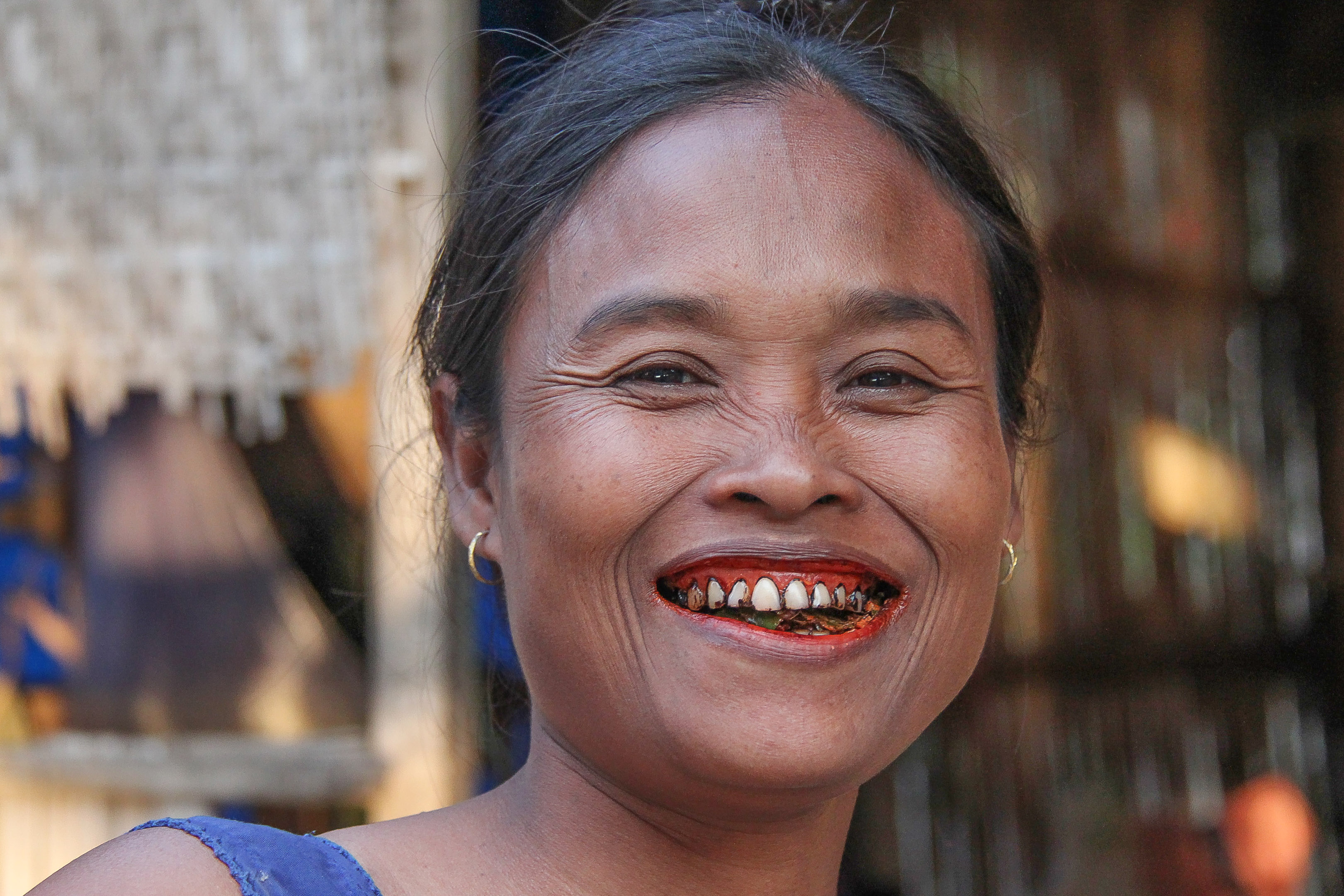
Red-stained teeth and gums are characteristic of long-term betel chewing

Chewing areca nut increases the risk of multiple forms of cancer and cardiovascular disease, with or without added tobacco.

Betel nut chewing causes an increased risk of head and neck cancers and esophageal cancer. Betel quid affects almost all parts of the human body, including the brain, heart, lungs, gastrointestinal tract and reproductive organs. It can cause myocardial infarction, cardiac arrhythmias, liver damage, asthma, type II diabetes, hyperlipidemia, metabolic syndrome, hypothyroidism, prostate hyperplasia and infertility. Habitual chewing of areca nuts increases the risk of cirrhosis and hepatocellular carcinoma. Chewing areca nuts is a cause of oral submucous fibrosis, a condition which may progress to mouth cancer. It has also been linked to throat cancer.

When chewed with additional tobacco in its preparation (like in gutka), there is an even higher risk for cancer, especially for oral and oropharyngeal cancers. With tobacco, it also raises the risk of fatal coronary artery disease, fatal stroke and non-fatal ischemic heart disease

The harm caused by consumption of areca nuts worldwide was classified in 2017 as a "neglected global public health emergency".

Indian government and agriculture ministry is probing the IARC report as a misconception. Significant opposition and contradictions in the IARC report has been reported in India. One such contradiction being, Arecoline, one of arecanut's principal constituents, is classified under Group II B (possibly carcinogenic to humans). Hence CAMPCO an Indian farmer co-operative is recommending IARC to re-classify arecanut from Group I to Group II-B

=== During pregnancy ===
Women who chew areca nut formulations, such as paan, during pregnancy significantly increase adverse outcomes for the baby. Betel quid chewing can cause stillbirth, premature birth, and low birth weight.

Using tobacco or areca nuts during pregnancy significantly increases adverse outcomes for the baby. The habit is associated with higher incidences of preterm birth and low birth weight and height. Biologically, these effects may be a consequence of the arecoline that is found in areca nuts. The habit also exposes the fetus to various other toxic components linked to cancer.

== Production ==
In 2023, world production of areca nuts was 2.3 million tonnes; India provided 60%, while Bangladesh and Myanmar were secondary producers, with the three countries together accounting for about 87% of the world total. The State of Karnataka in India alone produced 80% of country's overall production in 2020.

Production of areca nuts

Areca nut yield

== Consumption ==
=== South Asia ===
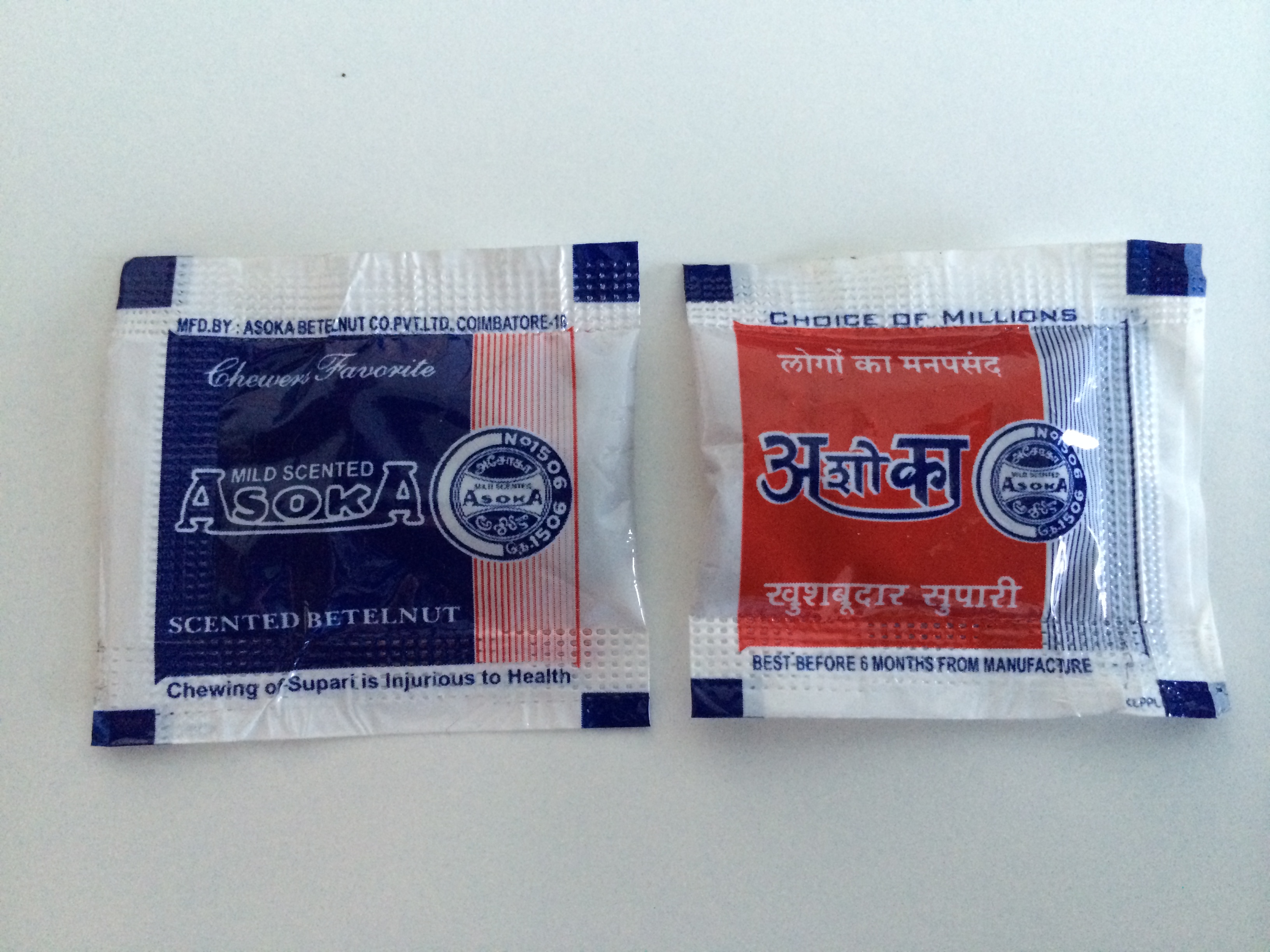
Areca nut sold in small packets in India

In India (the largest consumer of areca nut) and the rest of the Indian subcontinent, the preparation of nut with or without betel leaf is commonly referred to as paan. It is available practically everywhere and is sold in ready-to-chew pouches called pan masala or supari, which is the dried form of the areca nut, as a mixture of many flavours whose primary base is dried areca nut crushed into small pieces. Poor people, who may eat only every other day, use it to stave off hunger pangs. Pan masala with a small quantity of tobacco is called gutka. The easily discarded, small plastic supari or gutka pouches are a ubiquitous pollutant of the South Asian environment. Some of the liquid in the mouth is usually disposed of by spitting, producing bright red spots wherever the expectorate lands.

In the Maldives, areca nut chewing is very popular, but spitting is frowned upon and regarded as an unrefined, repulsive way of chewing. Usually, people prefer to chew thin slices of the dry nut, which is sometimes roasted. Killi, a mixture of areca nut, betel, cloves, cardamom and sugar is sold in small home-made paper pouches. Old people who have lost their teeth keep "chewing" by pounding the mixture of areca nut and betel with a small mortar and pestle.

=== Southeast Asia ===
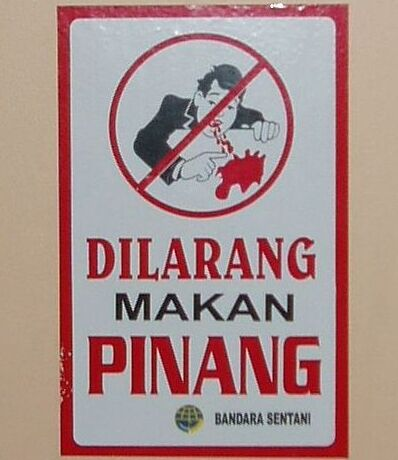
Sign prohibiting spitting after chewing betel-nut in Indonesia

In Thailand, the consumption of areca nut has declined gradually in the last decades. The younger generation rarely chews the substance, especially in the cities. Most of the present-day consumption is confined to older generations, mostly people above 50. Even so, small trays of betel leaves and sliced tender areca nut are sold in markets and used as offerings in Buddhist shrines.

In the northern Philippines, particularly the Cordillera Administrative Region, betel nut chewing remains prominent to the point that restrictions and fines have been established in urban areas such as Baguio City in the Benguet province. These restrictions were made under the idea that momma or moma (betel nut) chewing and spitting are improper during public transportation drivers' work hours and are considered stains to the city roads and sidewalks. Despite these restrictions, betel nut thrives across the Cordilleran market. An example of its commerciality can be observed in Ifugao, one of the provinces of the Philippine Cordilleras, where betel nuts are high-demand products sourced from the province's different cities and municipalities.

In Indonesian, the act of chewing betel nut is known as makan pinang, while in the Papua Province of Indonesia, it is known simply as pinang. The Pinang scissor was developed specifically for cutting it.

=== Oceania ===
In Papua New Guinea (PNG), betel nuts are referred to in Tok Pisin as buai, and grow abundantly on the northern coast, in Wewak and Madang. A controversial ban on selling and chewing betel nut in public places in Port Moresby, introduced in 2014 by the governor, was lifted in 2017. Because the popular nut continued to be smuggled in, prices rose dramatically. Police enforced the ban rigorously, and in 2015 two betel nut sellers died in Hanuabada after police reservists fired on a crowd. The governor of Port Moresby introduced another ban on the nut, restricted to an area in the business district of the city in July 2023. However many people make a living out of selling betel nuts, so are resistant to bans in their areas. On Manus Island, young men are exposed to piracy when they use small boats to travel to the northern coast to purchase betel nuts to trade, and several have disappeared.

In Australia, the importation, use, and sale of areca nut is banned, but it has been sold illegally in several South Asian supermarkets.

=== East Asia ===
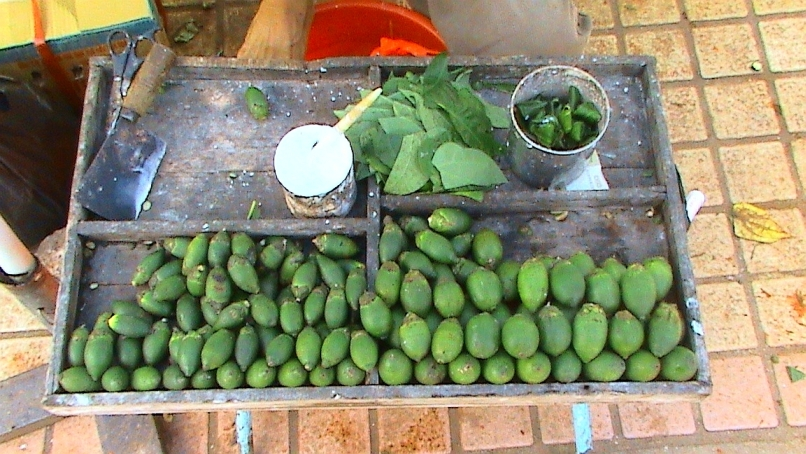
Areca nuts sold in Hainan, China

In Hainan and Hunan Province, China, where Xiangtan is a center of use and processing, a wide range of old and young people consume areca nut daily. Most, though, consume the dried variety of the nut by itself, without the betel leaves. Some people also consume the areca nut in its raw, fresh form with or without the betel leaves. Betel nuts are sold mostly by old women merchants, but the dried version can be found in shops that sell tea, alcohol, and cigarettes.

In Taiwan, bags of 20 to 40 areca nuts are purchased fresh daily by a large number of consumers. To meet the steady year-round demand, two kinds of betel-nut shops sell betel and nuts, as well as cigarettes and drinks, including beer: small mom and pop shops, often poorly maintained and with unassuming façades, and shops which will often consist of nothing more than a single, free-standing room, or booth. The latter is usually elevated one meter above the street, and measures less than 3 by 2 m. Large picture windows comprise two or more of the walls, allowing those who pass by a complete view of the interior. The interior is often painted brightly. Within such a shop, a sexily dressed young woman, a "betel nut beauty", can be seen preparing betel and areca nuts. Shops are often identified by colorful (commonly green) LED lamps or neon lights that frame the windows or that are arranged radially above a store. Customers stop on the side of the road and wait for the girls to bring their betel and areca nut to their vehicles. The habit of chewing betel nut is often associated with blue-collar labor industries such as long-haul transportation, construction, or fishing. Workers in these labor-intensive industries use betel nut for its stimulating effect, but it also becomes a tool for socializing with coworkers. For example, studies have shown chewing betel nut is prevalent among taxi, bus and truck drivers, who rely on the stimulating effect of betel nut to cope with long work hours. For these reasons, oral cancer has been identified as a leading cause of death in professions with high betel nut-chewing rates.

=== Other countries ===
In the United States, areca nut is not a controlled or specially taxed substance and may be found in some Asian grocery stores. However, importation of areca nut in a form other than whole or carved kernels of nuts can be stopped at the discretion of US Customs officers on the grounds of food, agricultural, or medicinal drug violations.

In the United Kingdom the betel nut is legal.

Possession of areca nut or betel leaf is banned in the UAE and is a punishable offence.

== In culture ==
=== Traditional consumption ===
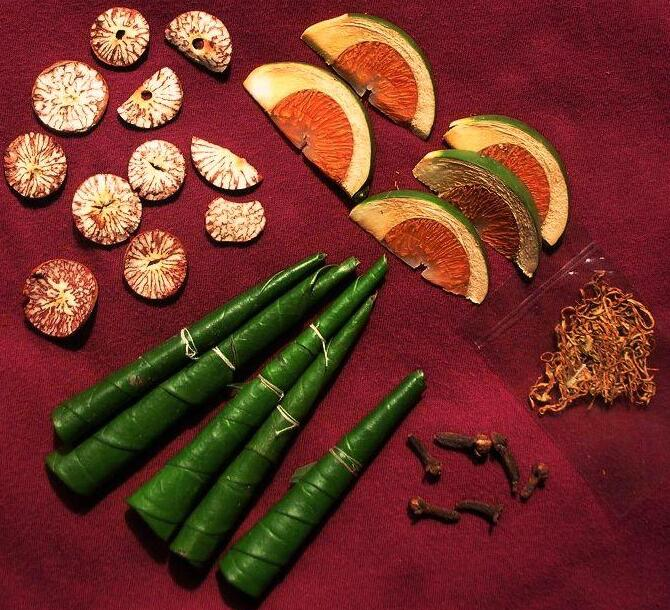
Display of the items usually included in a chewing session: The betel leaves are folded, with slices of the dry areca nut on the upper left hand and slices of the tender areca nut on the upper right. The pouch on the lower right contains tobacco, a relatively recent introduction.

Chewing the mixture of areca nut and betel leaf constitutes an important and popular cultural activity in many South Asian, Southeast Asian, East Asian and Oceanic countries. Why or when the areca nut and the betel leaf were first combined into one psychoactive drug is not known. Archaeological evidence from Thailand, Indonesia, and the Philippines suggests they have been used in tandem for at least 4,000 years.

The oldest unequivocal evidence of betel chewing is from the Philippines, specifically that of several individuals found in a burial pit in the Duyong Cave site of Palawan island dated to around 2680±250 BCE. The dentition of the skeletons is stained, typical of betel chewers. The grave also includes Anadara shells used as containers of lime, one of which still contained lime. Burial sites in Bohol dated to the first millennium CE also show the distinctive reddish stains characteristic of betel chewing. Based on linguistic evidence of how the reconstructed Proto-Austronesian term *buaq originally meaning "fruit" came to refer to "areca nut" in Proto-Malayo-Polynesian, it is believed that betel chewing originally developed somewhere within the Philippines shortly after the beginning of the Austronesian expansion (~3000 BCE). From the Philippines, it spread back to Taiwan, as well as onwards to the rest of Austronesia and in neighboring cultures through trade and migration.

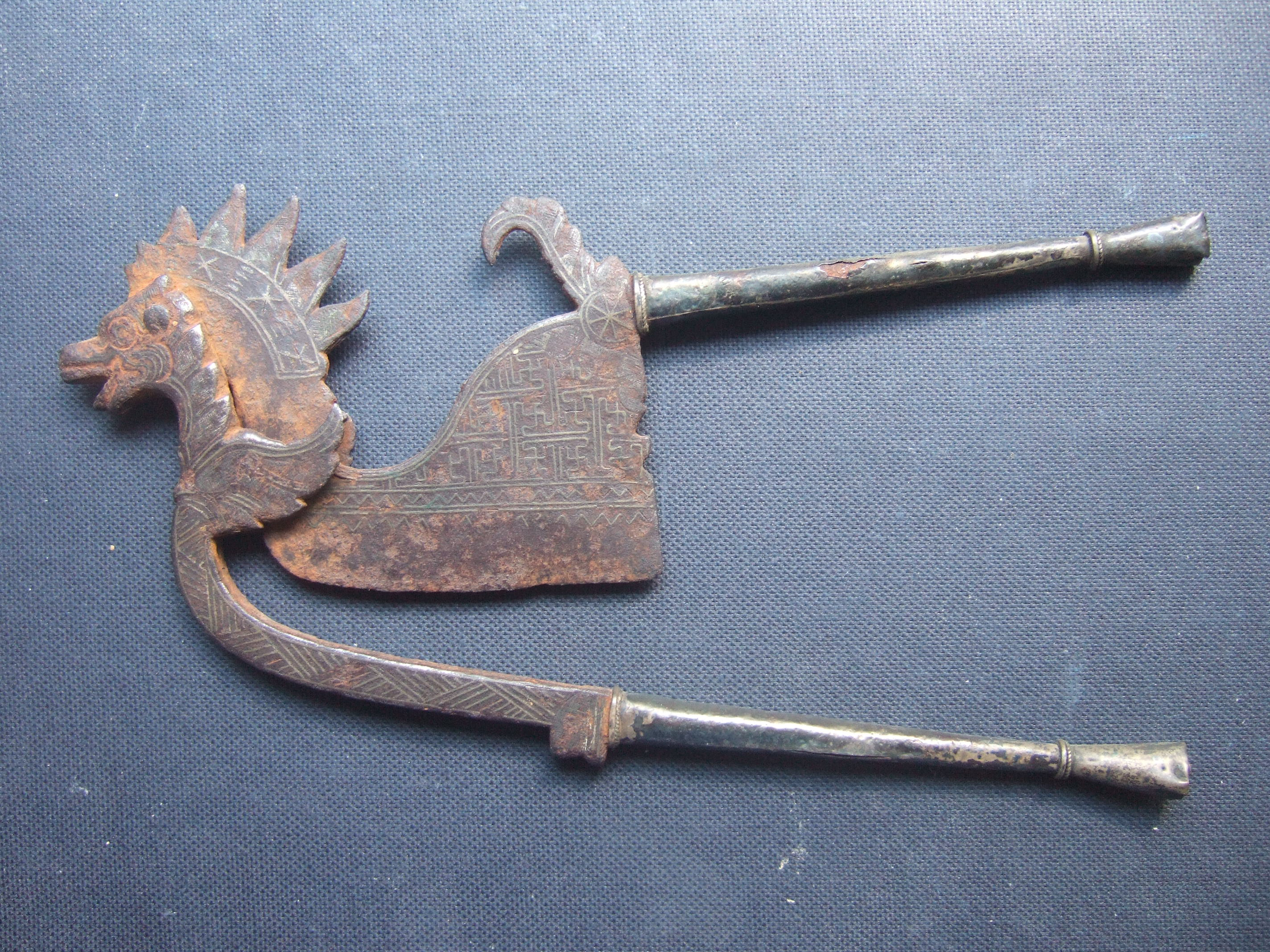
Areca nut cutter from Indonesia

In Vietnam, the areca nut and the betel leaf are such important symbols of love and marriage that in Vietnamese the phrase "matters of betel and areca" (chuyện trầu cau) is synonymous with marriage. The tradition of chewing areca nuts starts the talk between the groom's parents and the bride's parents about the young couple's marriage. Therefore, the leaves and juices are used ceremonially in Vietnamese weddings. The folk tale explaining the origin of this Vietnamese tradition is a good illustration of the belief that the combination of areca nut and the betel leaf is ideal to the point they are practically inseparable, like an idealized married couple.

Formerly, in both India and Sri Lanka, it was a custom of the royalty to chew areca nut with betel leaf. Kings had special attendants whose duty it was to carry a box with all the necessary ingredients for a good chewing session. There was also a custom for lovers to chew areca nut and betel leaf together, because of its breath-freshening and relaxant properties. A sexual symbolism thus became attached to the chewing of the nut and the leaf. The areca nut represented the male principle, and the betel leaf the female principle. Considered an auspicious ingredient in Hinduism and some schools of Buddhism, the areca nut is still used along with betel leaf in religious ceremonies, and also while honoring individuals in much of southern Asia.

In Assam, as well as most of its neighbouring Northeastern India states, areca nuts are preferably consumed in fermented form, which is supposed to make the fruit harder and sweeter. The raw nut may also be eaten during certain seasons when the fermented variety becomes unavailable, although it has more ritual importance. Standard-sized pieces of the nut and leaf are usually consumed in combination with lime and a bit of tobacco. In Assam, betel nut and leaf has indispensable cultural value; offering betel leaf and nut, (together known as gua) constitutes a part of social greeting and socialising. It is a tradition to offer pan-tamul (betel leaves and raw areca nut) to guests immediately upon arrival, and after tea or meals, served in a brass plate with stands called bota. In traditional Assamese societies carrying a pouch of tamul-pan upon one's person during journeys or during farming activities, and sharing of the same, was an essential requirement. Among the Assamese, the areca nut also has a variety of uses during religious and marriage ceremonies, where it has the role of a fertility symbol. No religious ritual is complete without the offering of tamul-pan to the gods and spirits as well as to the assembled guests. A tradition from Upper Assam is to invite guests to wedding receptions by offering a few areca nuts with betel leaves. During Bihu, the husori players are offered areca nuts and betel leaves by each household while their blessings are solicited.

Spanish mariner Álvaro de Mendaña reported observing Solomon Islanders chewing the nut and the leaf with caustic lime, and the manner in which the habit stained their mouths red. He noted the friendly and genial chief Malope, on Santa Isabel Island, would offer him the combination as a token of friendship every time they met.

In Bhutan, the areca nut is called doma. The soft and moist raw areca nut is very potent. When chewed it can cause palpitation and vasoconstriction. This form is eaten in the lower regions of Bhutan and in North Bengal, where the nut is cut into half and put into a local paan leaf with a generous amount of lime. In the rest of Bhutan the raw nut, with the husk on, is fermented such that the husk rots and is easy to extract. The fermented doma has a putrid odour, which can be smelled at a distance. Traditionally, the fragrant nut is cut in half and placed on top of a cone made of local betel leaf, which has a dash of lime put inside. "Myth has it that the inhabitants of Bhutan traditionally known as Monyul, the land of Monpas where Buddhism did not reach lived on raw flesh, drank blood, and chewed bones. After the arrival of Guru Rinpoche in the eighth century, he stopped the people from eating flesh and drinking blood and created a substitute which is betel leaf, lime and areca nut. Today, chewing doma has become a custom. Doma is served after meals, during rituals and ceremonies. It is offered to friends and is chewed at work places by all sections of society and has become an essential part of Bhutanese life and culture."

The addition of tobacco leaf to the chewing mixture is a relatively recent innovation, as tobacco was not introduced from the Americas until the colonial era.

Reasons for starting to consume areca nuts appears to involve complex psychosocial factors.

=== Construction fiber ===
The husk, which is between 50 and 75 percent of the weight and volume of an areca fruit, serves as a source of fiber for the construction industry. Typically, these fibers are considered to be waste, but can be used to strengthen construction materials.

== Gallery ==
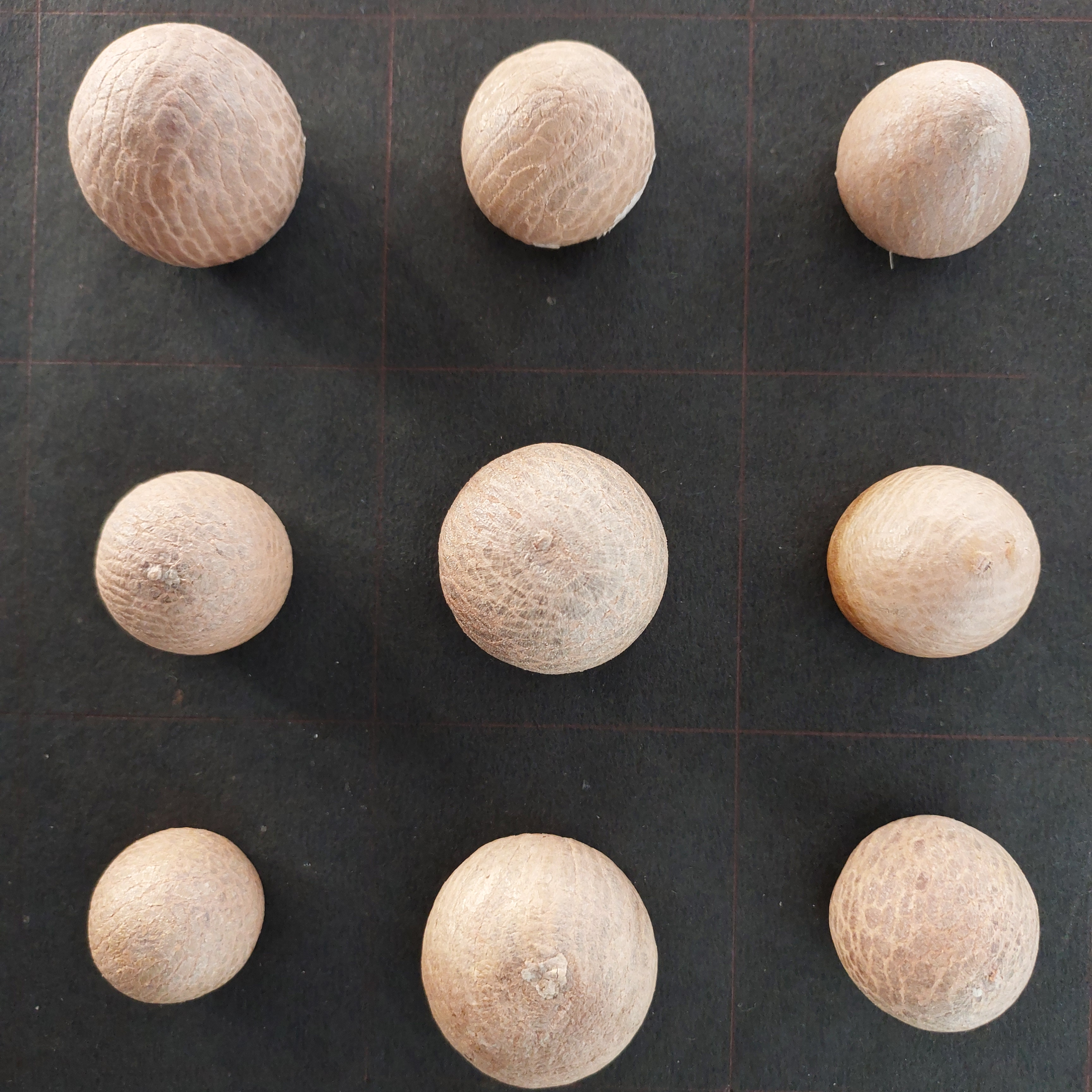
Areca nuts

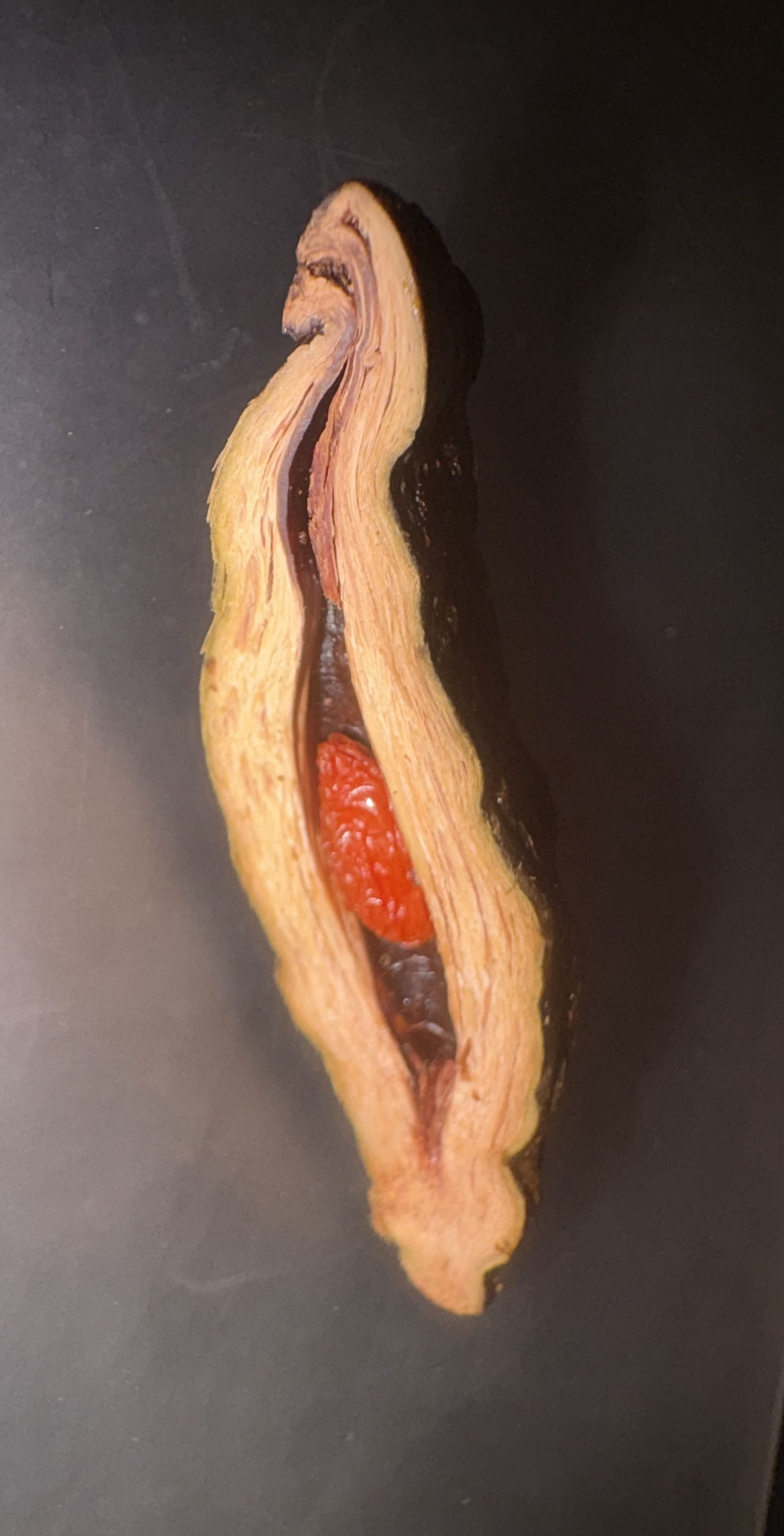
Cross-section of a processed areca nut

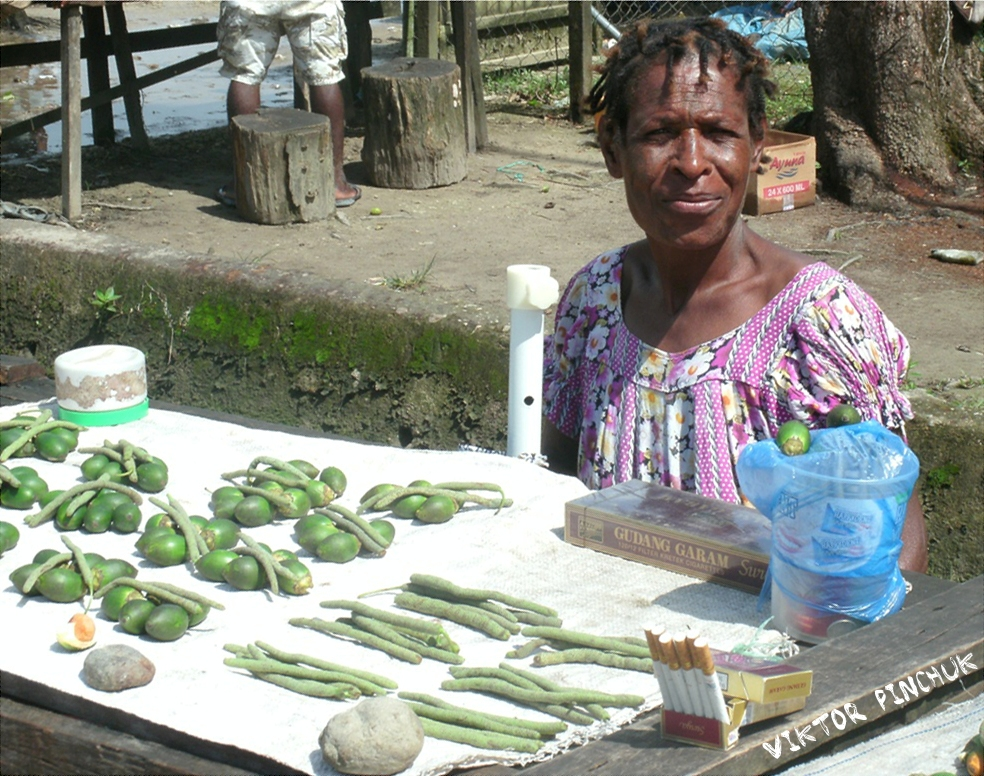
Betel nut saleswoman, Papua New Guinea

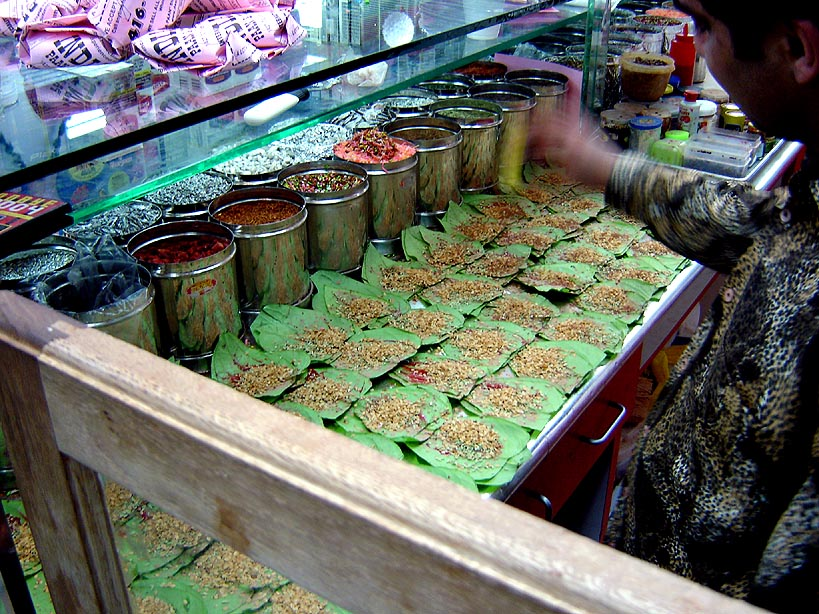
Shopkeeper making paan in an Indian store

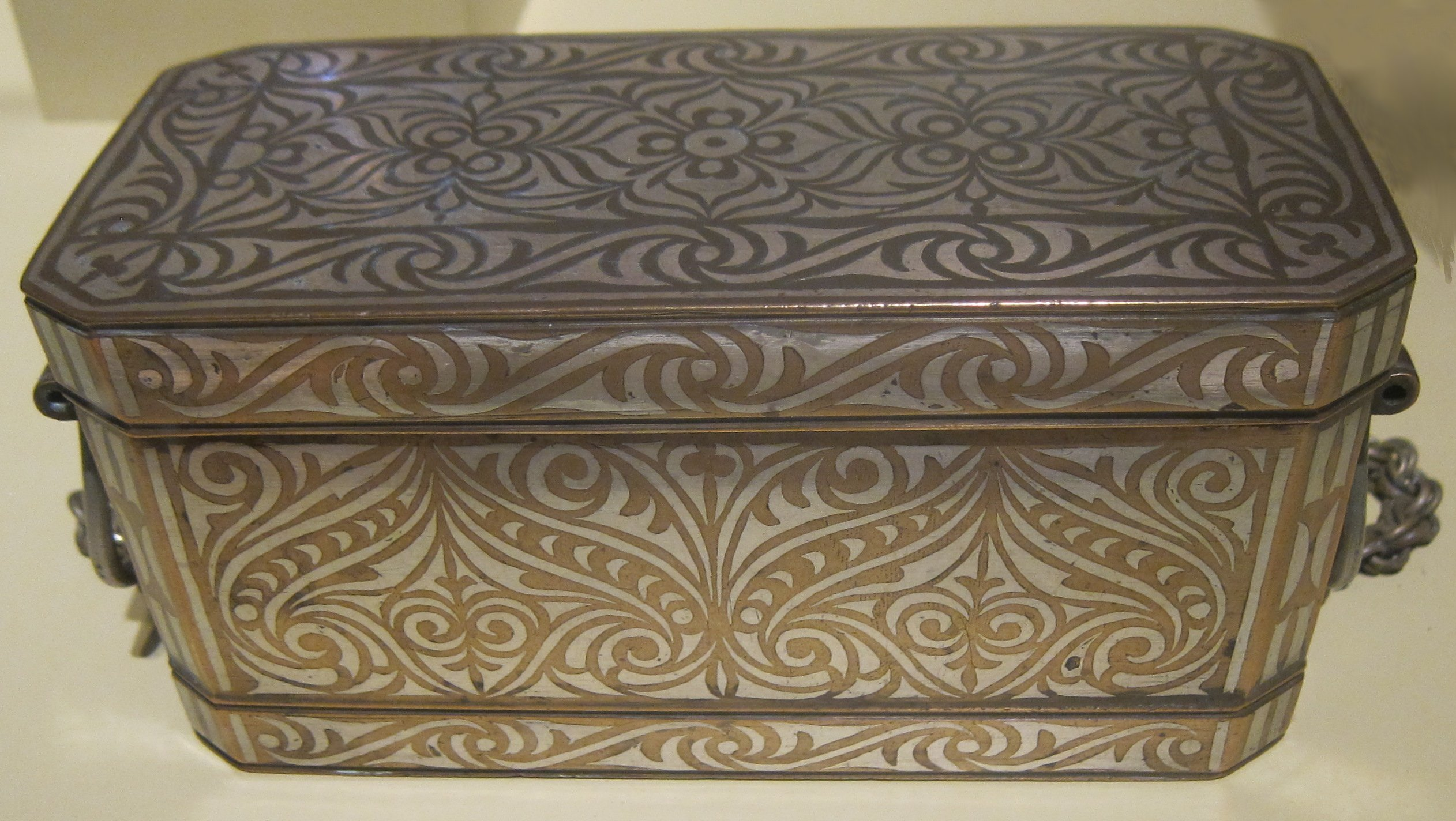
A betel nut box crafted by the Maranao people of the Philippines

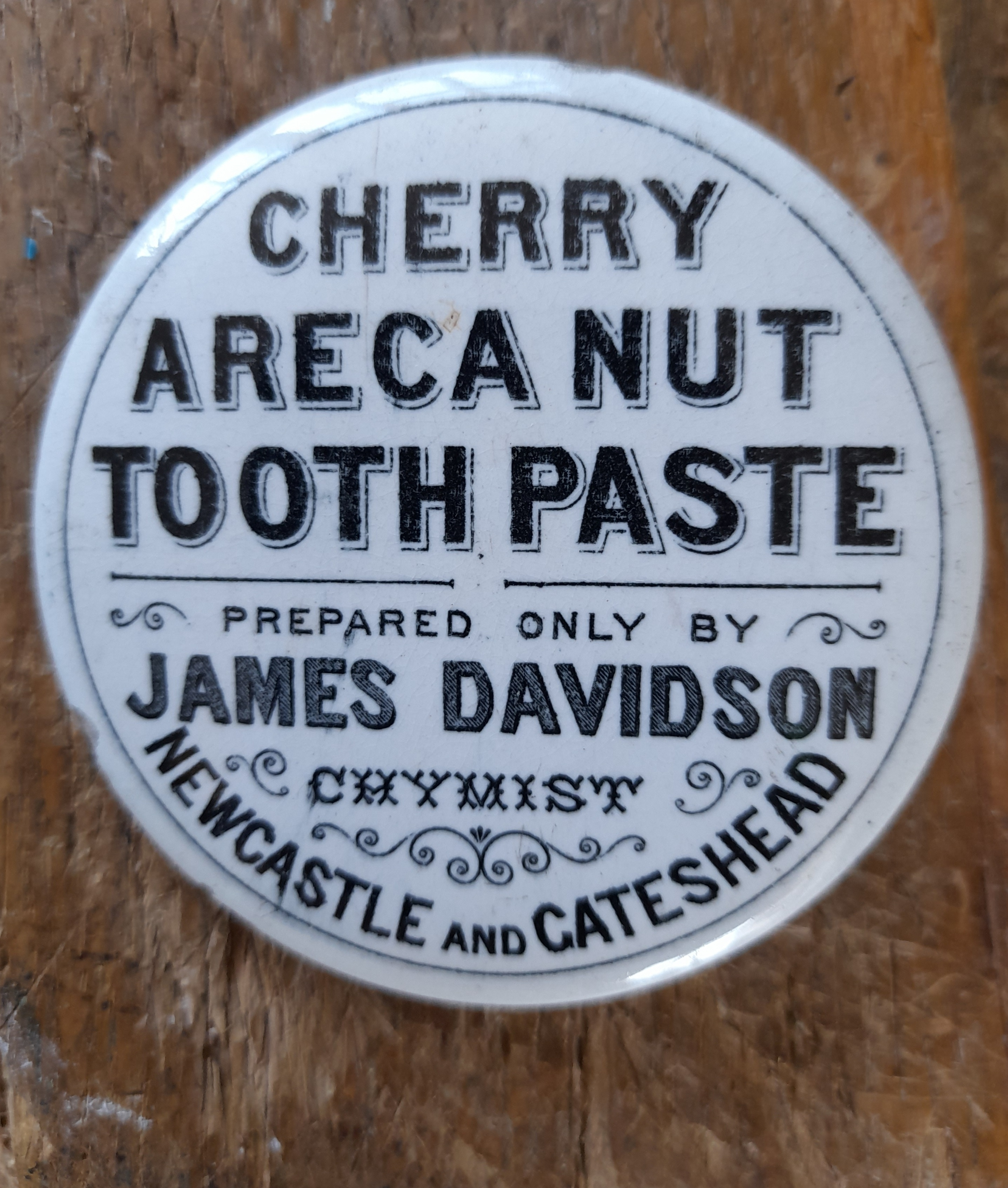
19th century, printed pot lid for tooth paste

Dried betelnut, outer shell being removed.

== See also ==
- List of herbs with known adverse effects
