= CHRNA6 =

Protein-coding gene in humans

Identifiers
- Aliases: CHRNA6, CHNRA6, cholinergic receptor nicotinic alpha 6 subunit
- External IDs: OMIM: 606888; MGI: 106213; GeneCards: CHRNA6

Gene location (Human)
Chr.	Chromosome 8 (human)
Band	8p11.21	Start	42,752,620 bp
Band	8p11.21	End	42,796,392 bp

Gene location (Mouse)
Chr.	Chromosome 8 (mouse)
Band	8|8 A2	Start	27,893,240 bp
Band	8|8 A2	End	27,903,972 bp
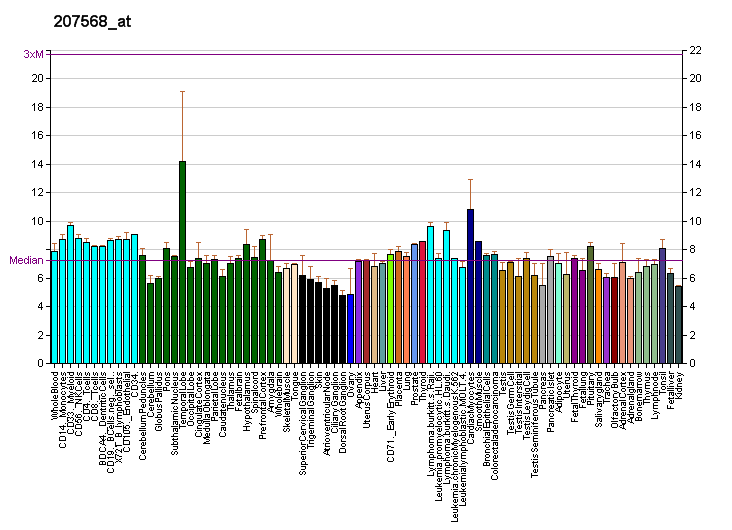
RNA expression pattern
Bgee	Human / Mouse (ortholog); Top expressed in: testicle; tibialis anterior muscle; mucosa of ileum; gonad; cerebellar cortex; deltoid muscle; cerebellar hemisphere; prefrontal cortex; right hemisphere of cerebellum; substantia nigra / Top expressed in: lumbar spinal ganglion; neural layer of retina; substantia nigra; ventral tegmental area; blastocyst; central gray substance of midbrain; Ileal epithelium; superior colliculus; pituitary gland; embryo; More reference expression data
BioGPS	More reference expression data
Gene ontology
Molecular function	acetylcholine binding; acetylcholine receptor activity; ion channel activity; extracellular ligand-gated ion channel activity; ligand-gated ion channel activity; protein binding; acetylcholine-gated cation-selective channel activity; transmembrane signaling receptor activity
Cellular component	integral component of membrane; postsynaptic membrane; membrane; synapse; cell junction; plasma membrane; acetylcholine-gated channel complex; dopaminergic synapse; integral component of postsynaptic membrane; integral component of presynaptic membrane; integral component of plasma membrane; neuron projection
Biological process	regulation of dopamine secretion; response to nicotine; membrane depolarization; synaptic transmission, cholinergic; ion transport; neuromuscular synaptic transmission; signal transduction; chemical synaptic transmission; regulation of postsynaptic membrane potential; excitatory postsynaptic potential; cation transmembrane transport; ion transmembrane transport; regulation of synaptic vesicle exocytosis; regulation of membrane potential; nervous system process
Sources:Amigo / QuickGO
Orthologs
Databases	NCBI: entry; OMA: entry
Species	Human	Mouse
Entrez	8973	11440
Ensembl	ENSG00000147434	ENSMUSG00000031491
UniProt	Q15825	Q9R0W9
RefSeq (mRNA)	NM_004198; NM_001199279	NM_021369
RefSeq (protein)	NP_001186208; NP_004189	NP_067344
Location (UCSC)	Chr 8: 42.75 – 42.8 Mb	Chr 8: 27.89 – 27.9 Mb
PubMed search
- Wikidata
View/Edit Human	View/Edit Mouse

Cholinergic receptor, nicotinic, alpha 6, also known as nAChRα6, is a protein that in humans is encoded by the CHRNA6 gene. The CHRNA6 gene codes for the α6 nicotinic receptor subunit that is found in certain types of nicotinic acetylcholine receptors found primarily in the brain. α6 subunits cannot form homomeric receptors. Instead, they form heteromeric receptors along with other alpha or beta subunits. Different combinations of subunits create receptors with unique pharmacology.

== Tissue distribution ==
α6-containing nicotinic acetylcholine receptors (nAChRs) show a restricted expression pattern in the brain. Neural nicotinic acetylcholine receptors containing α6 subunits are expressed on dopamine-releasing neurons in the midbrain. α6 nAChRs are primarily expressed in three regions: the Ventral Tegmental Area (VTA) and the Substantia Nigra (SN), which are both part of the midbrain dopaminergic system, and the Locus Coeruleus (LC), located in the brainstem.

== Function ==
α6 nAChRs play a key role in regulating dopaminergic neurotransmission and respond to both nicotine and ethanol.

=== Nicotine ===
In the presence of nicotine, α6 nAChRs activate dopamine release in the VTA. This appears to take place through two mechanisms.

First, nicotine binds to α6 nAChRs on the axon terminals of presynaptic GABAergic neurons, which synapse onto postsynaptic dopaminergic neurons. Nicotine quickly desensitizes these receptors, preventing them from allowing Ca2+ to enter the axon terminal. Without Ca2+ to trigger neurotransmitter release, less GABA is released onto dopaminergic neurons. As a result, dopaminergic neurons are less inhibited, leading to more dopamine release.

Second, nicotine binds to and activates α6 nAChRs on dopaminergic neurons. In the dendrites, this causes excitatory depolarization, increasing the dopaminergic cells' firing rate. At the axon terminals, this allows Ca2+ to enter, facilitating neurotransmitter release. Together, these effects cause dopaminergic neurons to release more dopamine.

Dopamine release following activation of these neurons is thought to be involved in the addictive properties of nicotine. Studies in mice show that knocking out the α6 subunit causes mice to stop self-administering nicotine, while reintroducing the subunit reverses this result.

=== Ethanol ===
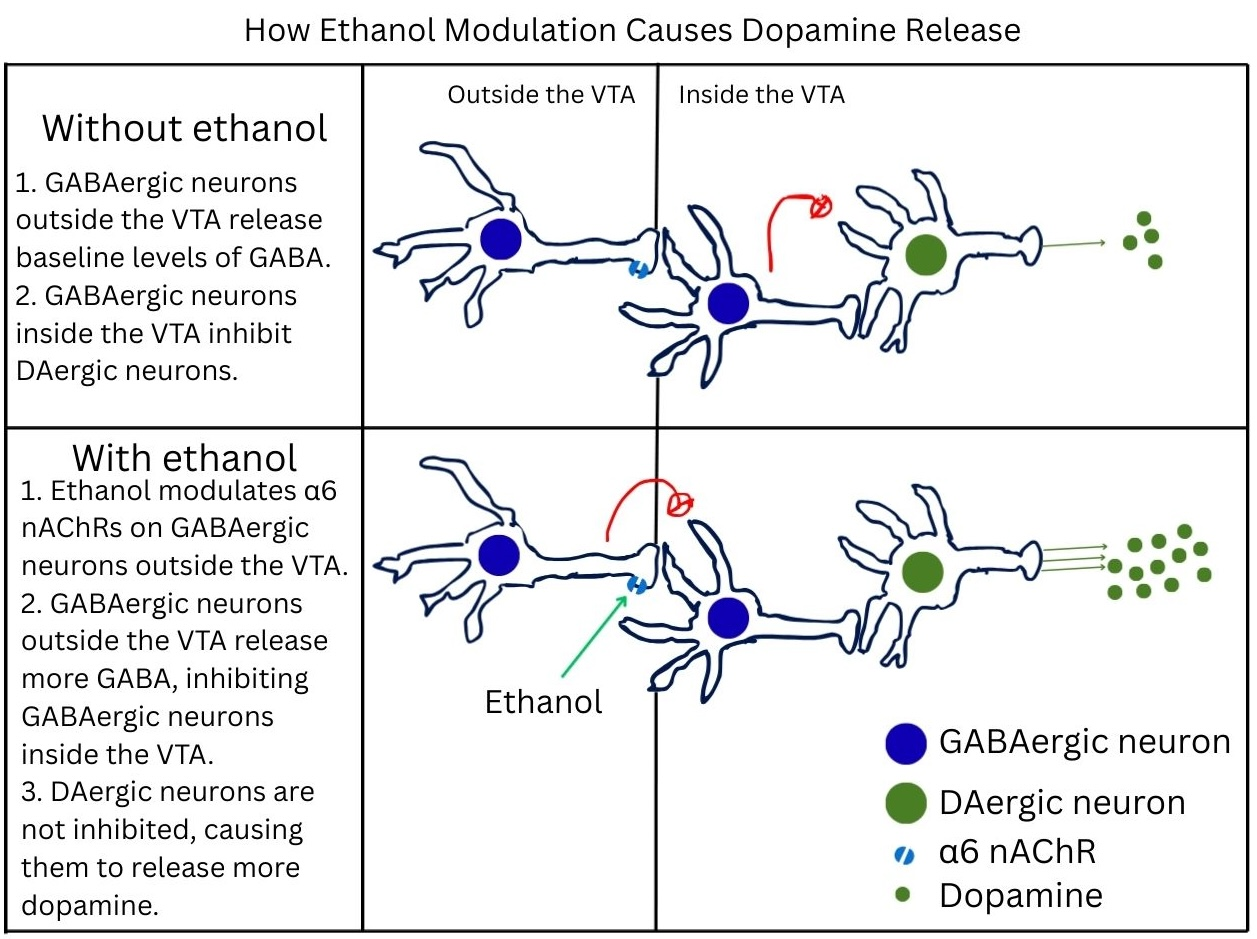
Ethanol modulates α6 nAChRs to cause dopamine release in the VTA.

In the VTA, low levels of ethanol increase dopamine release. Ethanol acts as a positive allosteric modulator by binding to α6 nAChRs on the axon terminals of GABAergic neurons outside the VTA, which connect to other GABAergic neurons within the VTA. ACh binding to these receptors causes Ca2+ influx into the upstream GABAergic neurons. Ethanol enhances this influx. This increases GABA release onto the VTA GABAergic neurons, inhibiting them and reducing their suppression of dopaminergic neurons. As a result, the dopaminergic neurons fire more rapidly, increasing dopamine release within the VTA

However, very high levels of ethanol actually reduce dopamine release. The exact mechanism for this is unknown.

In addition to nicotine, research in animals has implicated α6-containing nAChRs in the abusive and addictive properties of ethanol, with mecamylamine demonstrating a potent ability to block these properties.

== Clinical significance ==
Because of their selective distribution and role in dopamine regulation in the Substantia Nigra, α6-containing receptors have been investigated as therapeutic targets. Due to their selective localisation on dopaminergic neurons, α6-containing nACh receptors have also been suggested as a possible therapeutic target for the treatment of Parkinson's disease.

== Interactive pathway map ==
Click on genes, proteins and metabolites below to link to respective articles. (Note: The interactive pathway map can be edited at WikiPathways: "NicotineDopaminergic_WP1602".)

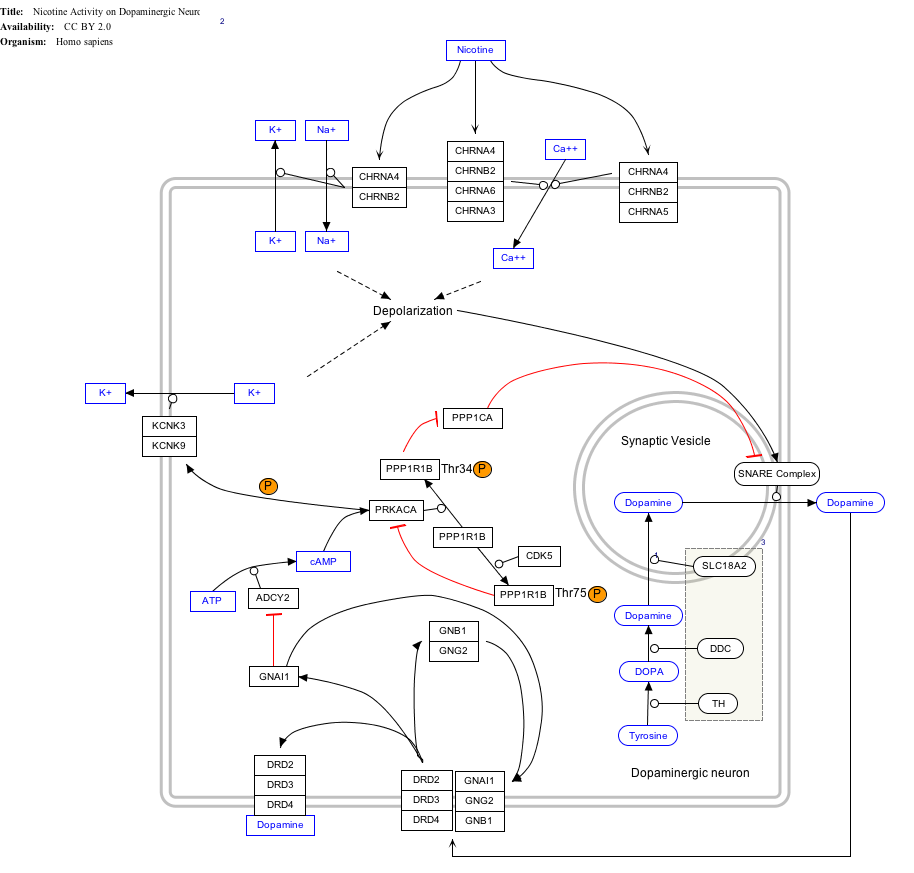

Nicotine Activity on Dopaminergic Neurons edit

== See also ==
- Nicotinic acetylcholine receptor
