= Methiodide =

In organic chemistry, a methiodide is a chemical derivative produced by the reaction of a compound with methyl iodide. Methiodides are often formed through the methylation of tertiary amines:

R_{3}N + CH_{3}I → (CH_{3})R_{3}N^{+}I^{−}

Whereas the parent amines are hydrophobic and often oily, methiodides, being salts, are somewhat hydrophilic and exhibit high melting points. Methiodides exhibit altered pharmacological properties as well.

Examples include:

- Cocaine methiodide, a charged cocaine analog which cannot pass the blood brain barrier and enter the brain
- Bicuculline methiodide, a water-soluble form of bicuculline

Tertiary phosphines and phosphite esters also form methiodides.
