= Guvacoline =

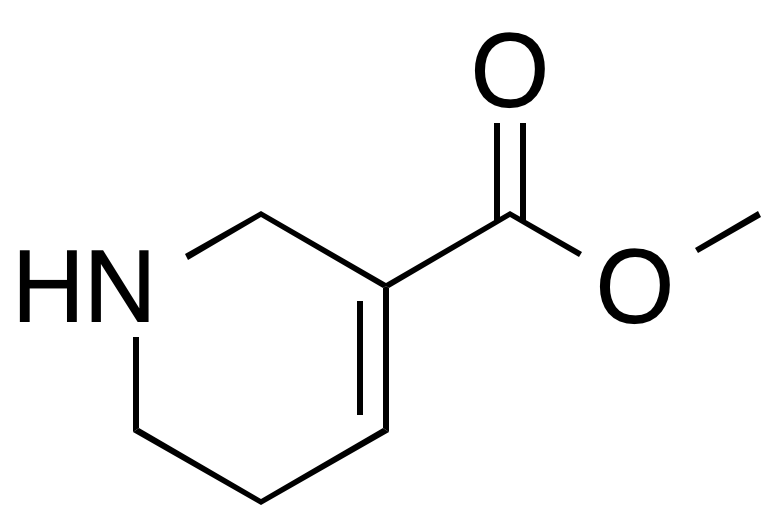

Names
- Preferred IUPAC name Methyl 1,2,5,6-tetrahydropyridine-3-carboxylate

Identifiers
CAS Number	495-19-2
3D model (JSmol)	Interactive image
ChEBI	CHEBI:80754
ChEMBL	ChEMBL268808
ChemSpider	141033
KEGG	C16821
PubChem CID	160492
UNII	YT3OF85P98
CompTox Dashboard (EPA)	DTXSID20197805
- InChI: InChI=1S/C7H11NO2/c1-10-7(9)6-3-2-4-8-5-6/h3,8H,2,4-5H2,1H3 Key: DYPLDWLIOGXSSE-UHFFFAOYSA-N
- SMILES: COC(=O)C1=CCCNC1

Properties
Chemical formula	C_{7}H_{11}NO_{2}
Molar mass	141.170 g·mol^{−1}
- Except where otherwise noted, data are given for materials in their standard state (at 25 °C [77 °F], 100 kPa). Infobox references

Guvacoline is a compound with the chemical formula C_{7}H_{11}NO_{2}. It is a component of Areca nut and a precursor of guvacine. It agonizes muscarinic receptors just like arecoline but unlike arecoline it lacks nicotinic activity.

== See also ==
- Guvacine
- Arecoline
