= Areca palm =

Areca palm is a common name for several plants and may refer to:

- Areca, a genus of palms
- Dypsis lutescens, a palm which is a popular houseplant
- Areca catechu, also known as the betel palm, is sometimes referred to as an "areca" palm, particularly in the Philippines
