= Guvacine =

Clinical data
- Drug class: GABA reuptake inhibitor
- ATC code: None

Identifiers
- IUPAC name: 1,2,5,6-tetrahydropyridine-3-carboxylic acid
- CAS Number: 498-96-4
- PubChem CID: 3532
- IUPHAR/BPS: 4691
- ChemSpider: 3412
- UNII: 41538P325K
- KEGG: C10149
- ChEMBL: ChEMBL76768
- CompTox Dashboard (EPA): DTXSID50871702

Chemical and physical data
- Formula: C_{6}H_{9}NO_{2}
- Molar mass: 127.143 g·mol^{−1}
- 3D model (JSmol): Interactive image
- SMILES: C1CNCC(=C1)C(=O)O
- InChI: InChI=1S/C6H9NO2/c8-6(9)5-2-1-3-7-4-5/h2,7H,1,3-4H2,(H,8,9); Key:QTDZOWFRBNTPQR-UHFFFAOYSA-N

Guvacine is a tetrahydropyridine alkaloid found in areca nuts. It is the N-demethylated derivative of arecaidine and the product of ester hydrolysis of guvacoline, both of which are also found in areca nuts as well. The compound is a potent and selective GABA reuptake inhibitor via GABA transporter 1 (GAT-1) inhibition. It shows poor blood–brain barrier penetration. Lime hydrolyzes guvacoline to guvacine.

== See also ==
- Nipecotic acid
- THPO
- Isoguvacine
- Tiagabine
