= Arecaidine =

Chemical compound

Clinical data
- Other names: Methylguvacine; Arecaine; N-Methylguvacine
- Drug class: GABA reuptake inhibitor; Sedative
- ATC code: None

Identifiers
- IUPAC name: 1-methyl-3,6-dihydro-2H-pyridine-5-carboxylic acid
- CAS Number: 499-04-7
- PubChem CID: 10355
- IUPHAR/BPS: 9487
- ChemSpider: 9928
- UNII: 0S8YEV0D4O
- KEGG: C10128
- ChEBI: CHEBI:2813
- ChEMBL: ChEMBL432561
- CompTox Dashboard (EPA): DTXSID60198139

Chemical and physical data
- Formula: C_{7}H_{11}NO_{2}
- Molar mass: 141.170 g·mol^{−1}
- 3D model (JSmol): Interactive image
- SMILES: CN1CCC=C(C1)C(=O)O
- InChI: InChI=1S/C7H11NO2/c1-8-4-2-3-6(5-8)7(9)10/h3H,2,4-5H2,1H3,(H,9,10); Key:DNJFTXKSFAMXQF-UHFFFAOYSA-N

Arecaidine, also known as N-methylguvacine, is an alkaloid in areca nuts and a GABA reuptake inhibitor. It is structurally similar to the GABA reuptake inhibitors guvacine and nipecotic acid. Arecaidine has been found to produce sedative effects in mice and to protect against the lethality of the GABA_{A} receptor antagonists bicuculline and pentylenetetrazol. On the other hand, it did not produce anticonvulsant effects. Lime is said to hydrolyse arecoline to arecaidine.
