= Lanrui Feng =

Chinese economist (1920–2019)

- 冯兰瑞
- Born: 16 September 1920; Guiyang, Guizhou, China
- Died: 28 February 2019 (aged 98)
- Political party: Chinese Communist Party
- Spouse: Li Chang

Lanrui Feng (Chinese: 冯兰瑞; pinyin: Féng Lánruì, 16 September 1920 – 28 February 2019) was a well known Chinese economist born in Guiyang, Guizhou, China. As a member of the Chinese Communist Party, Lanrui Feng used to be the chief editor of Shanghai Youth Daily, editorial committee of China Youth Daily, and a fellow of the Institute of Marxism-Leninism and Mao Zedong Thought, Chinese Academy of Social Sciences. She has been included on the Who's a Who multiple times on various versions globally and has been called by media "a successful Chinese lady".

== Early life and education ==
Lanrui Feng was born into a fairly well-off family in 1920. She was against the Chinese traditional education system and actively participated in related student revolutions since she was young. Because of this, she was kicked out of the school three times. In 1938, she joined the Chinese Communist Party. Lanrui Feng followed the government's arrangement in 1940 to move to Yan'an, China to work for the Chinese Youth Committee and learnt English at the same time. In the same year, Lanrui Feng married Dongming Wei (魏东明) and they divorced in 1944. Two years later, she married Li Chang (李昌) in fall 1946. After the second marriage, Feng moved along her husband Li Chang's job arrangement from Yan'an to Shanghai, then Harbin. In 1954, Feng went to the Central Party School to study political economy.

== Career ==
- 1946: Editor of Xinhua News Agency, broadcast department
- 1949: Proprietor and chief editor of the Shanghai Youth Daily
- 1951: Editorial committee of the China Youth Daily
- 1953: Chief editor of the Harbin Daily
- 1956: Director of Heilongjiang Institution of Economy and deputy director of Heilongjiang Statistics Bureau
- 1980: Fellow and deputy director of the Institute of Marxism–Leninism and Mao-Zedong-Thought, Chinese Academy of Social Sciences
- 1983: Advisor of the Institute of Marxism-Leninism and Mao Zedong Thought, Chinese Academy of Social Sciences

== Notable works ==
=== Selected journal articles ===
- Feng, Lanrui and Gu Liuzhen (1987). Labor Force Mobility and the Mechanism for Regulating it. Renmin ribao (People’s Daily), 2 January, translated in JPRS-CEA 87–015.
- Feng, Lanrui and Jiang Weiyu (1988). A Comparative Study of the Modes of Transfer of Surplus Labour in China’s Countryside. Social Sciences in China, no. 3.
- Feng, Lanrui and Zhao Lükuan (1981). Urban Unemployment in China. Selected Writings on Studies of Marxism, no. 20.
- Feng, Lanrui, Zhou Beilong and Su Chongde (1983). On the Relationship Between Employment and Economic Growth. Selected Writings on Studies of Marxism, no. 4.
- Feng, Lanrui (1996). Zhongguo disanci shiye gaofeng de qingkuang ji duice (Chinese' third peak period of unemployment and solutions). Shehuixue yanjiu, no.5 11-21.
- Feng, Lanrui and Jiang Weiyu (1988). Shehui zhuyi chuji jieduan laodong jiuye wenti yanjiu (Research on the Question of Employment in the Initial Stage of Socialism) 社会主义初级阶段劳动就业问题研究. Changsha: Hunan Renmin chubanshe.
- Feng, Lanrui, Su Shaozhi, Yan Honglin and Wu Jinglian, eds. (1983). Lun anlao fenpei (On ‘Distribution According to Labour’) 论劳动分配. Beijing: Beijing Renmin chubanshe.
- Feng, Lanrui (1981). Laodong baochou yu laodong jiuye (Wage and Employment) 劳动报酬与劳动就业. Beijing: Zhongguo zhanwang chubanshe.
- Feng, Lanrui (1991). Lun Zhongguo de laodong li shichang (On China's Labor Market) 论中国的劳动力市场. Beijing: Zhongguo chengshi chubanshe.
