= Woodblock printing =

Early printing technique using carved wooden blocks

China engraved block printing technique
- UNESCO Intangible Cultural Heritage
- Country: China
- Reference: 229
- Region: Asia-Pacific region

Inscription history
- Inscription: 2009 (4th session)
- List: Representative
- UNESCO Cultural Heritage

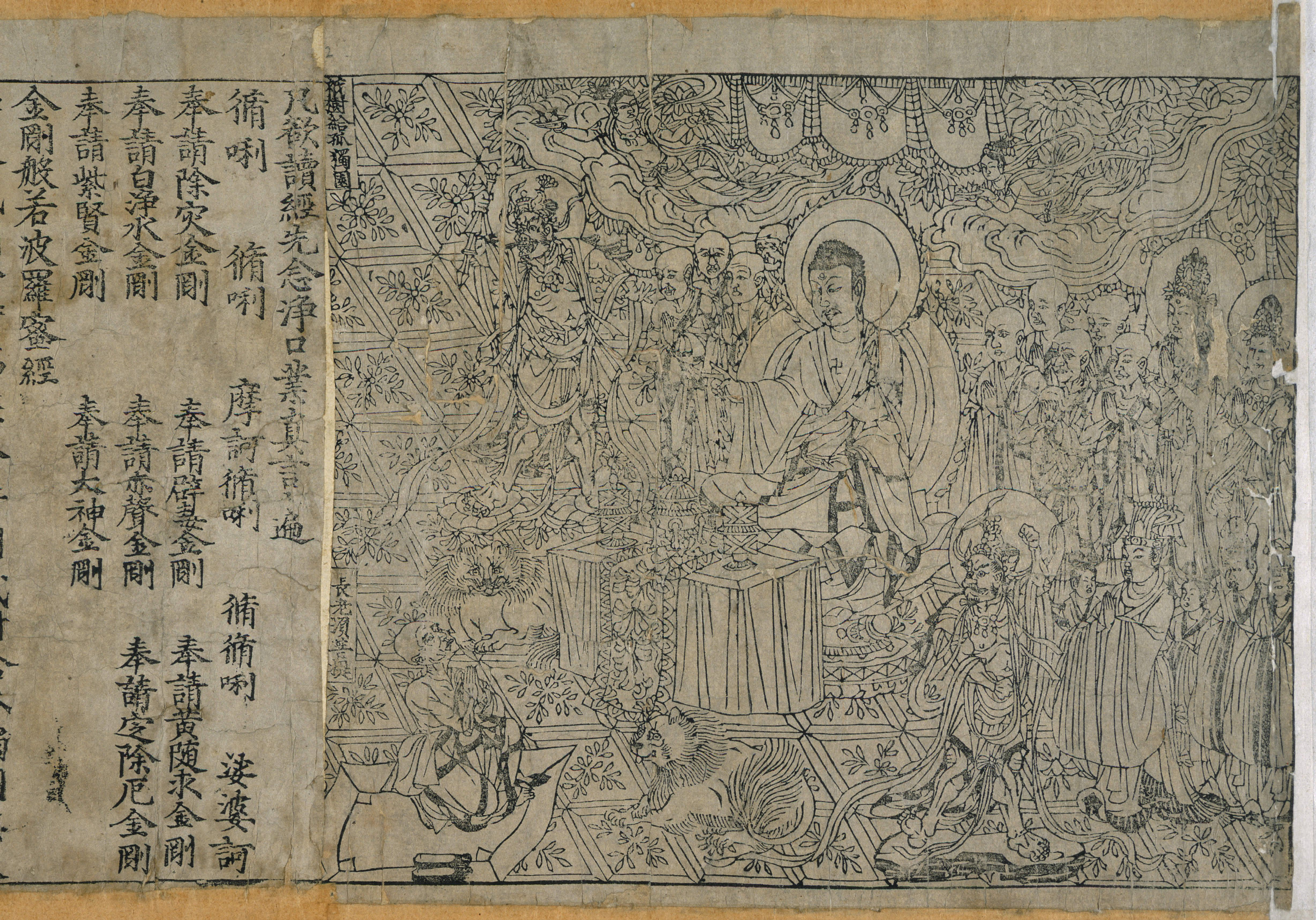
The intricate frontispiece of the Diamond Sutra from Tang dynasty China, the world's earliest printed text containing a date of production, AD 868 (British Library)

Woodblock printing or block printing is a technique for printing text, images or patterns used widely throughout all of East Asia and originating in China in antiquity as a method of printing on textiles and later on paper. Each page or image is created by carving a wooden block to leave only some areas and lines at the original level; it is these that are inked and show in the print, in a relief printing process. Carving the blocks is skilled and laborious work, but a large number of impressions can then be printed.

As a method of printing on cloth, the earliest surviving examples from China date to before 220 AD. Woodblock printing existed in Tang China by the 7th century AD and remained the most common East Asian method of printing books and other texts, as well as images, until the 19th century. Ukiyo-e is the best-known type of Japanese woodblock art print. Most European uses of the technique for printing images on paper are covered by the art term woodcut, except for the block books produced mainly in the 15th century.

== History ==
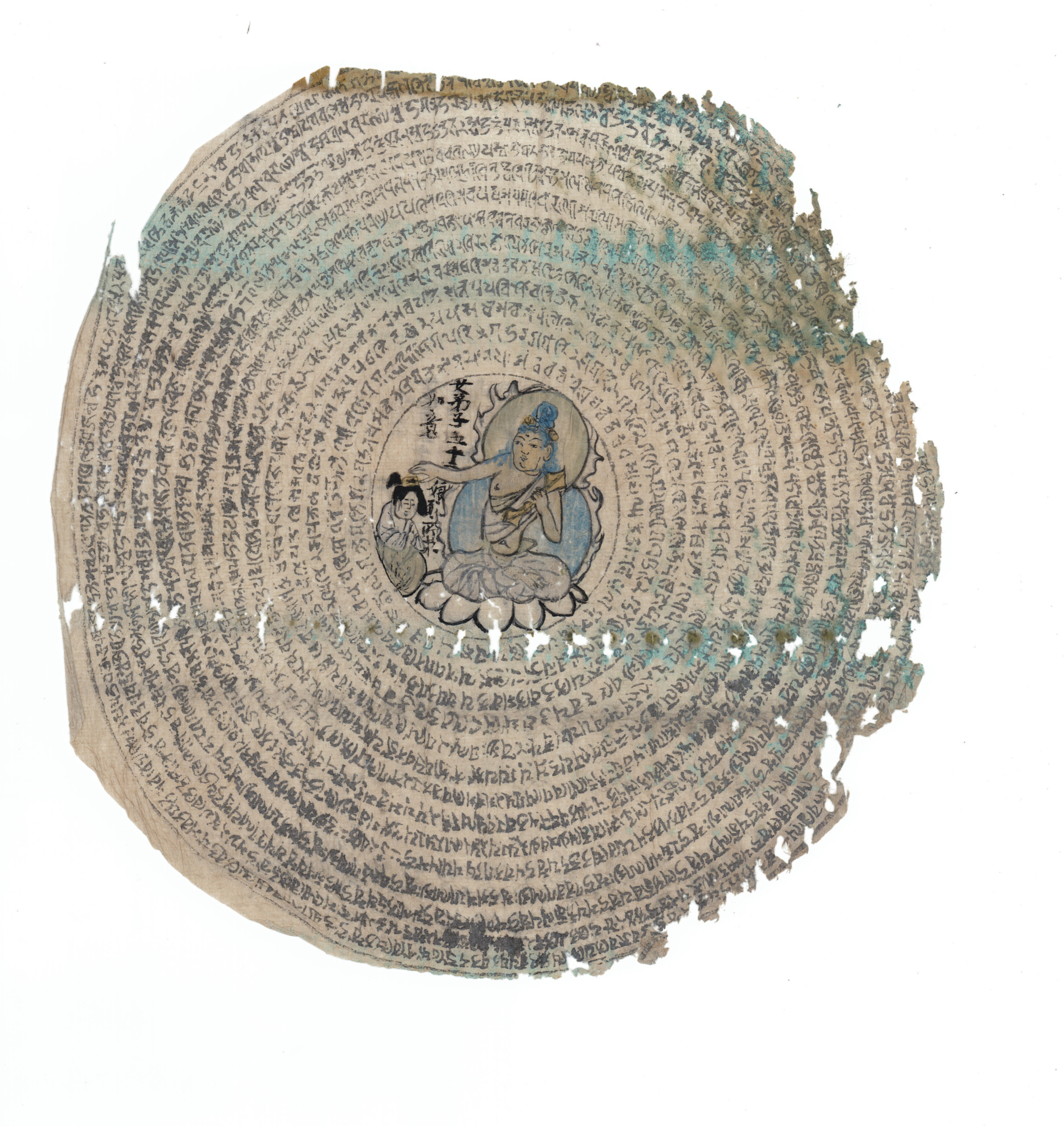
A fragment of a dharani print in Sanskrit and Chinese, c. 650 – c. 670, Tang dynasty

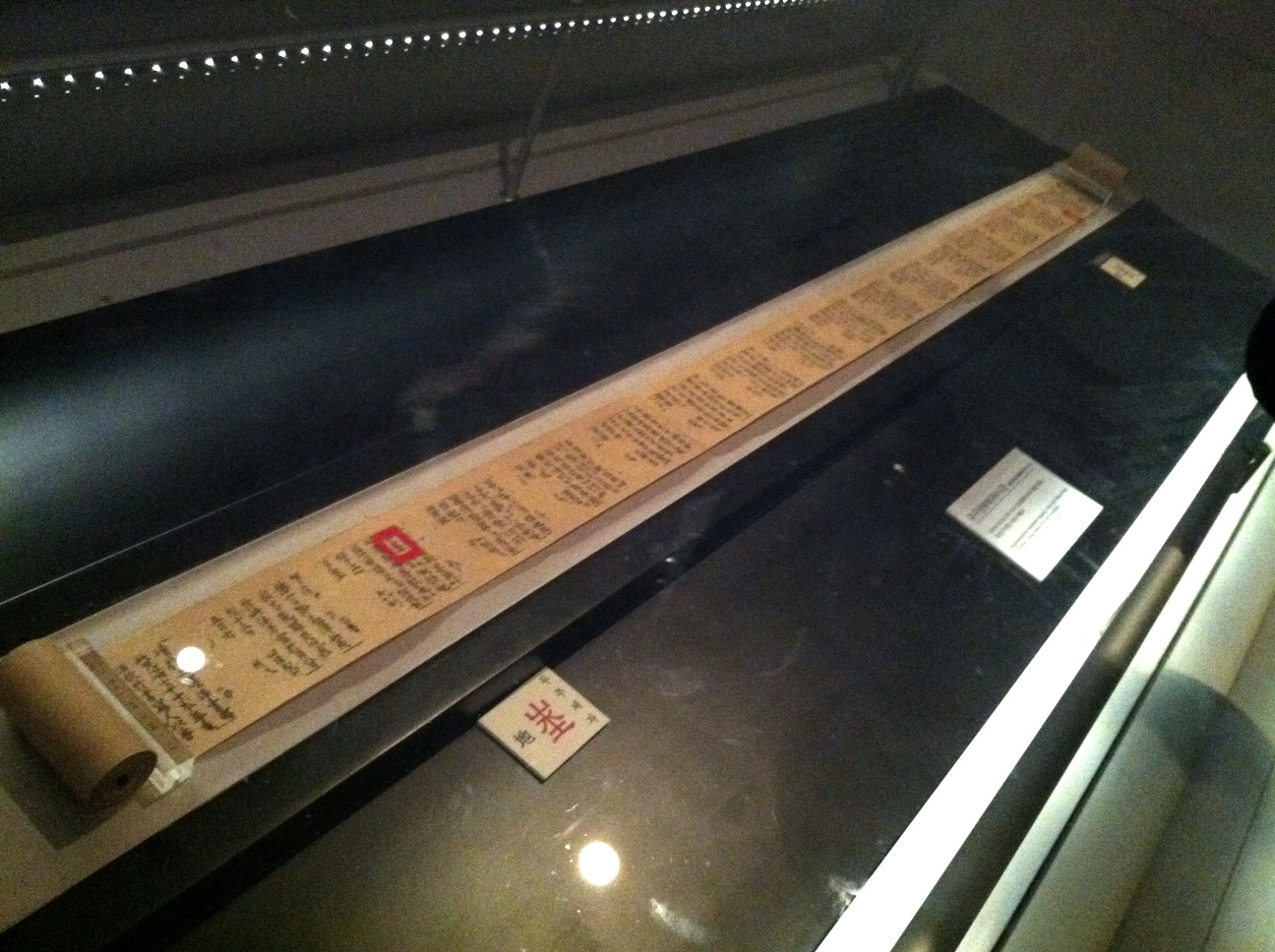
Replica of The Great Dharani Sutra, the oldest printed text in Korea, c. 704 – c. 751

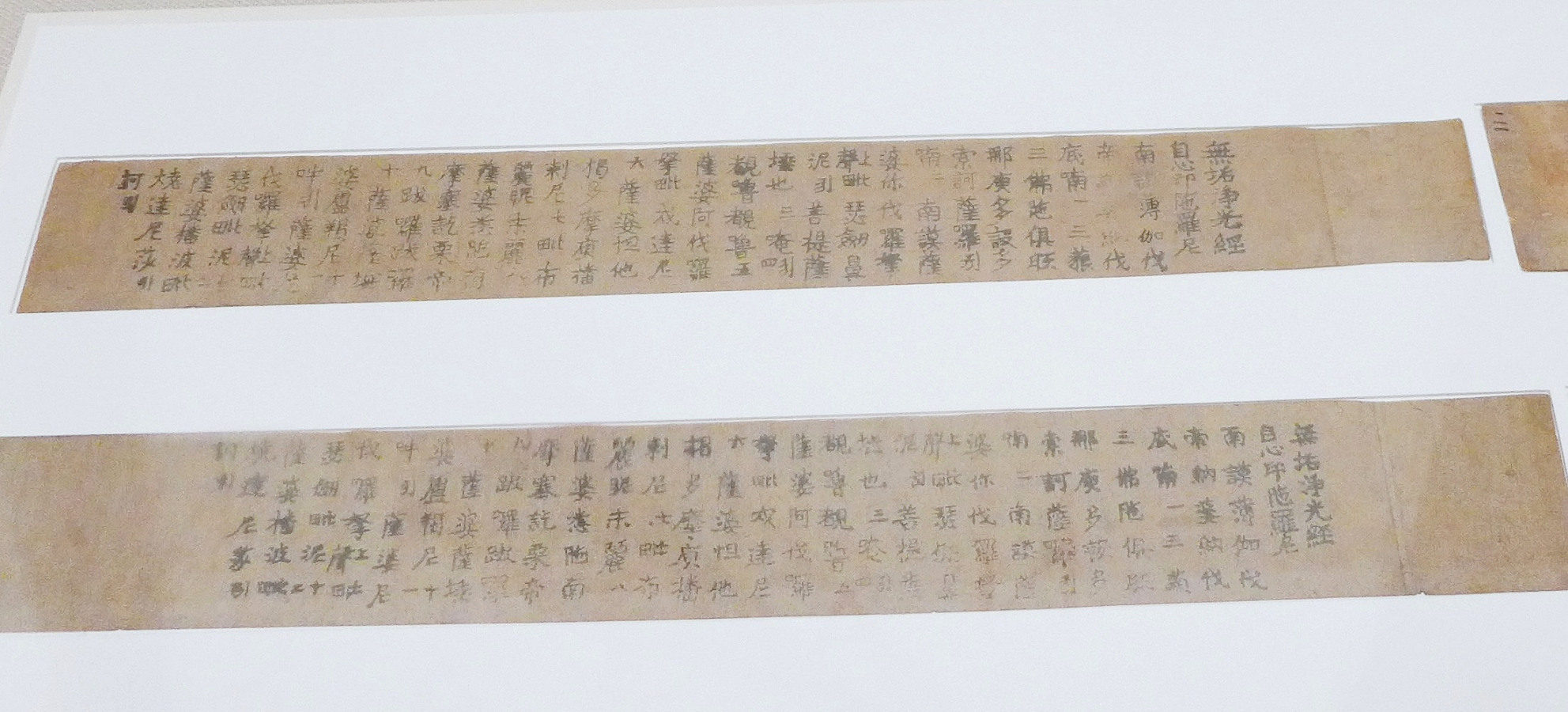
The Hyakumantō Darani, the oldest printed text in Japan, c. 770

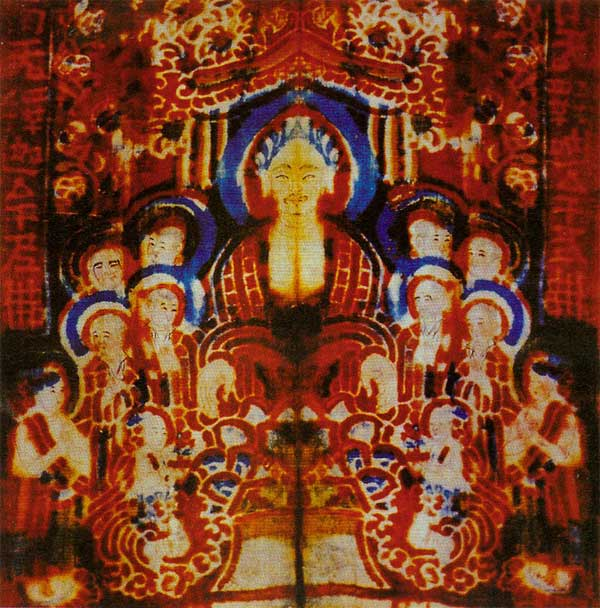
Coloured woodcut Buddha, 10th century, China

=== China ===
According to the Book of Southern Qi, in the 480s, a man named Gong Xuanyi (龔玄宜) styled himself Gong the Sage and "said that a supernatural being had given him a 'jade seal jade block writing,' which did not require a brush: one blew on the paper and characters formed." He then used his powers to mystify a local governor. Eventually he was dealt with by the governor's successor, who presumably executed Gong. Timothy Hugh Barrett postulates that Gong's magical jade block was actually a printing device, and Gong was one of the first, if not the first printer. The semi-mythical record of him therefore describes his usage of the printing process to deliberately bewilder onlookers and create an image of mysticism around himself. However, woodblock print flower patterns applied to silk in three colours have been found dated from the Han dynasty (before AD 220).

Inscribed seals made of metal or stone, especially jade, and inscribed stone tablets probably provided inspiration for the invention of printing. Copies of classical texts on tablets were erected in a public place in Luoyang during the Han dynasty for scholars and students to copy. The Suishu jingjizhi, the bibliography of the official history of the Sui dynasty, includes several ink-squeeze rubbings, believed to have led to the early duplication of texts that inspired printing. A stone inscription cut in reverse dating from the first half of the 6th century implies that it may have been a large printing block.

The rise of printing was greatly influenced by Mahayana Buddhism. According to Mahayana beliefs, religious texts hold intrinsic value for carrying a Buddha's word and act as talismanic objects containing sacred power capable of warding off evil spirits. By copying and preserving these texts, Buddhists could accrue personal merit. As a consequence the idea of printing and its advantages in replicating texts quickly became apparent to Buddhists, who by the 7th century, were using woodblocks to create apotropaic documents. These Buddhist texts were printed specifically as ritual items and were not widely circulated or meant for public consumption. Instead they were buried in consecrated ground. The earliest extant example of this type of printed matter is a fragment of a dhāraṇī (Buddhist spell) miniature scroll written in Sanskrit unearthed in a tomb in Xi'an. It is called the Great spell of unsullied pure light (Wugou jingguang da tuoluoni jing 無垢淨光大陀羅尼經) and was printed using woodblock during the Tang dynasty, c. 650–670 AD. A similar piece, the Saddharma pundarika sutra, was also discovered and dated to 690 to 699.

This coincides with the reign of Wu Zetian, under which the Longer Sukhāvatīvyūha Sūtra, which advocates the practice of printing apotropaic and merit making texts and images, was translated by Chinese monks. The oldest extant evidence of woodblock prints created for the purpose of reading are portions of the Lotus Sutra discovered at Turpan in 1906. They have been dated to the reign of Wu Zetian using character form recognition. The oldest text containing a specific date of printing was discovered in the Mogao Caves of Dunhuang in 1907 by Aurel Stein. This copy of the Diamond Sutra is 14 feet long and contains a colophon at the inner end, which reads: "Reverently [caused to be] made for universal free distribution by Wang Jie on behalf of his two parents on the 13th of the 4th moon of the 9th year of Xiantong [i.e. 11 May AD 868 ]". It is considered the world's oldest securely dated woodblock scroll. The Diamond sutra was closely followed by the earliest extant printed almanac, the Qianfu sinian lishu (乾符四年曆書), dated to 877.

In 2009, UNESCO recognized Chinese woodblock printing as an Intangible Cultural Heritage of Humanity.

=== Spread ===
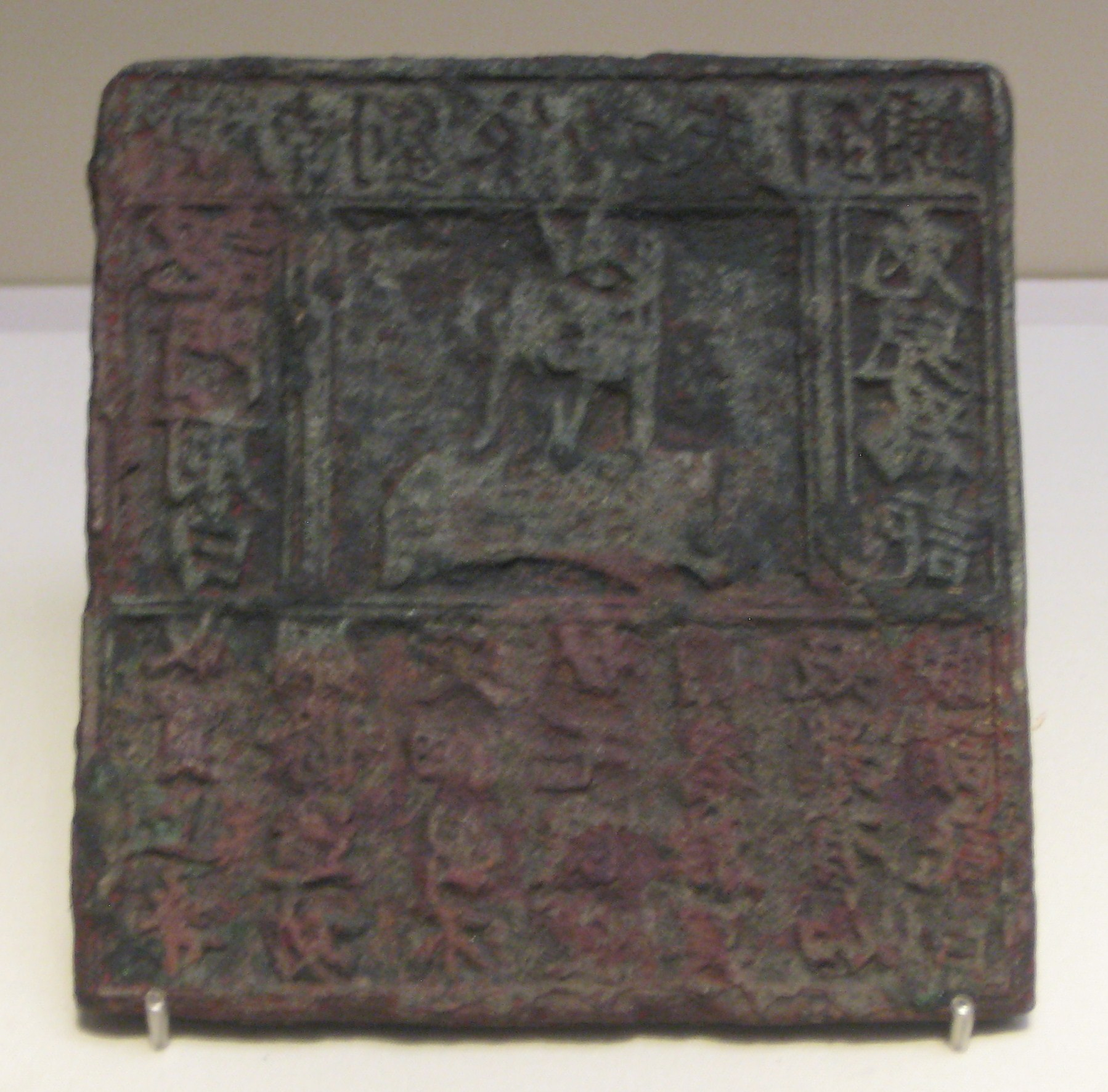
Bronze plate for printing an advertisement for the Liu family needle shop at Jinan, Song dynasty (960-1279). The world's oldest extant print advertising medium.

Evidence of woodblock printing appeared in Korea and Japan soon afterward. The Great Dharani Sutra (Korean: 무구정광대다라니경/無垢淨光大陀羅尼經, romanized: Muggujeonggwang Daedaranigyeong) was discovered at Bulguksa, South Korea in 1966 and dated between 704 and 751 in the era of Later Silla. The document is printed on a 8 cm × 630 cm (3.1 in × 248.0 in) mulberry paper scroll. A dhāraṇī sutra was printed in Japan around AD 770. One million copies of the sutra, along with other prayers, were ordered to be produced by Empress Shōtoku. As each copy was then stored in a tiny wooden pagoda, the copies are together known as the Hyakumantō Darani (百万塔陀羅尼, "1,000,000 towers/pagodas Darani").

Woodblock printing spread across Eurasia by 1000 AD and could be found in the Byzantine Empire. However printing onto cloth only became common in Europe by 1300. "In the 13th century the Chinese technique of blockprinting was transmitted to Europe", soon after paper became available in Europe.

=== Song dynasty ===
From 932 to 955 the Twelve Classics and an assortment of other texts were printed. During the Song dynasty, the Directorate of education and other agencies used these block prints to disseminate their standardized versions of the Classics. Other disseminated works include the Histories, philosophical works, encyclopaedias, collections, and books on medicine and the art of war.

In 971 work began on the complete Tripiṭaka Buddhist Canon (Kaibao zangshu 開寶藏書) in Chengdu. It took 10 years to finish the 130,000 blocks needed to print the text. The finished product, the Sichuan edition of the Kaibao Canon, also known as the Kaibao Tripitaka, was printed in 983.

Prior to the introduction of printing, the size of private collections in China had already seen an increase since the invention of paper. Fan Ping (215–84) had in his collection 7,000 rolls (juan), or a few hundred titles. Two centuries later, Zhang Mian owned 10,000 juan, Shen Yue (441–513) 20,000 juan, and Xiao Tong and his cousin Xiao Mai both had collections of 30,000 juan. Emperor Yuan of Liang (508–555) was said to have had a collection of 80,000 juan. The combined total of all known private book collectors prior to the Song dynasty number around 200, with the Tang alone accounting for 60 of them.

Following the maturation of woodblock printing, official, commercial, and private publishing businesses emerged while the size and number of collections grew exponentially. The Song dynasty alone accounts for some 700 known private collections, more than triple the number of all the preceding centuries combined. Private libraries of 10–20,000 juan became commonplace while six individuals owned collections of over 30,000 juan. The earliest extant private Song library catalogue lists 1,937 titles in 24,501 juan. Zhou Mi's collection numbered 42,000 juan, Chen Zhensun's collection lists 3,096 titles in 51,180 juan, and Ye Mengde (1077–1148) as well as one other individual owned libraries of 6,000 titles in 100,000 juan. The majority of which were secular in nature. Texts contained material such as medicinal instruction or came in the form of a leishu (類書), a type of encyclopaedic reference book used to help examination candidates.

Imperial establishments such as the Three Institutes: Zhaowen Institute, History Institute, and Jixian Institute also followed suit. At the start of the dynasty the Three Institutes' holdings numbered 13,000 juan, by the year 1023 39,142 juan, by 1068 47,588 juan, and by 1127 73,877 juan. The Three Institutes were one of several imperial libraries, with eight other major palace libraries, not including imperial academies. According to Weng Tongwen, by the 11th century, central government offices were saving tenfold by substituting earlier manuscripts with printed versions. The impact of woodblock printing on Song society is illustrated in the following exchange between Emperor Zhenzong and Xing Bing in the year 1005:

The emperor went to the Directorate of Education to inspect the Publications Office. He asked Xing Bing how many woodblocks were kept there. Bing replied, "At the start of our dynasty, there were fewer than four thousand. Today, there are more than one hundred thousand. The classics and histories, together with standard commentaries, are all fully represented. When I was young and devoted myself to learning, there were only one or two scholars in every hundred who possessed copies of all the classics and commentaries. There was no way to copy so many works. Today, printed editions of these works are abundant, and officials and commoners alike have them in their homes. Scholars are fortunate indeed to have been born in such an era as ours!

In 1076, the 39 year old Su Shi remarked upon the unforeseen effect an abundance of books had on examination candidates:

I can recall meeting older scholars, long ago, who said that when they were young they had a hard time getting their hands on a copy of Shiji or Han shu. If they were lucky enough to get one, they thought nothing of copying the entire text out by hand, so they could recite it day and night. In recent years merchants engrave and print all manner of books belonging to the hundred schools, and produce ten thousand pages a day. With books so readily available, you would think that students' writing and scholarship would be many times better than what they were in earlier generations. Yet, to the contrary, young men and examination candidates leave their books tied shut and never look at them, preferring to amuse themselves with baseless chatter. Why is this?

Woodblock printing also changed the shape and structure of books. Scrolls were gradually replaced by concertina binding (經摺裝) from the Tang period onward. The advantage was that it was now possible to flip to a reference without unfolding the entire document. The next development known as whirlwind binding (xuanfeng zhuang 旋風裝) was to secure the first and last leaves to a single large sheet, so that the book could be opened like an accordion.

Around the year 1000, butterfly binding was developed. Woodblock prints allowed two mirror images to be easily replicated on a single sheet. Thus two pages were printed on a sheet, which was then folded inwards. The sheets were then pasted together at the fold to make a codex with alternate openings of printed and blank pairs of pages. In the 14th century the folding was reversed outwards to give continuous printed pages, each backed by a blank hidden page. Later the sewn bindings were preferred rather than pasted bindings. Only relatively small volumes (juan 卷) were bound up, and several of these would be enclosed in a cover called a tao, with wooden boards at front and back, and loops and pegs to close up the book when not in use. For example, one complete Tripitaka had over 6,400 juan in 595 tao.

=== Ming dynasty ===
Despite the productive effect of woodblock printing, historian Endymion Wilkinson notes that it never supplanted handwritten manuscripts. Indeed, manuscripts remained dominant until the very end of Imperial China:

As a result of block-printing technology, it became easier and cheaper to produce multiple copies of books quickly. By the eleventh century, the price of books had fallen by about one tenth what they had been before and as a result they were more widely disseminated. Nevertheless, even in the fifteenth century most books in major libraries were still in manuscript, not in print. Almost to the end of the empire, it remained cheaper to pay a copyist than to buy a printed book. Seven hundred and fifty years after the first imperially sponsored printed works in the Northern Song, the greatest book project of the eighteenth century, the Complete Library of the Four Treasuries (四庫全書), was produced as a manuscript, not as a printed collection. About 4 percent of it was printed in movable type in 1773, but it was hand-carved movable wooden type. Indeed, the entire collection was only printed for the first time in the 1980s. Access to books, especially large works, such as the Histories, remained difficult right into the twentieth century.

— Endymion Wilkinson

Not only did manuscripts remain competitive with imprints, they were even preferred by elite scholars and collectors. The age of printing gave the act of copying by hand a new dimension of cultural reverence. Those who considered themselves real scholars and true connoisseurs of the book did not consider imprints to be real books. Under the elitist attitudes of the time, "printed books were for those who did not truly care about books".

However, copyists and manuscripts only continued to remain competitive with printed editions by dramatically reducing their price. According to the Ming dynasty author Hu Yinglin, "if no printed edition were available on the market, the hand-copied manuscript of a book would cost ten times as much as the printed work", and also, "once a printed edition appeared, the transcribed copy could no longer be sold and would be discarded". The result is that despite the mutual co-existence of hand-copied manuscripts and printed texts, the cost of the book had declined by about 90 percent by the end of the 16th century. As a result, literacy increased. In 1488, the Korean Choe Bu observed during his trip to China that "even village children, ferrymen, and sailors" could read, although this applied mainly to the south, while northern China remained largely illiterate.

==== Three-five coloured prints ====
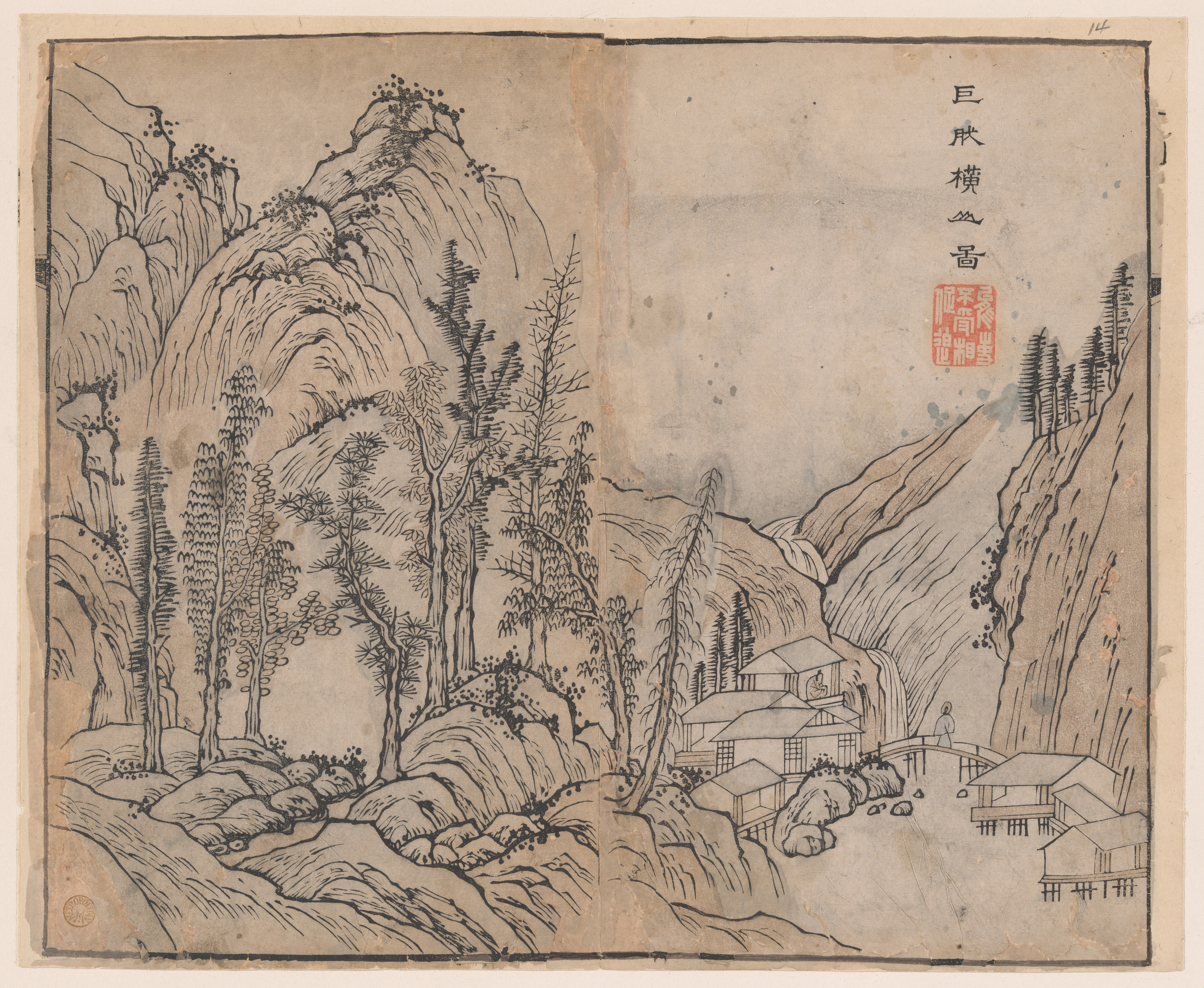
Illustration from Painting Manual of the Garden as Large as a Mustard Seed (c. 1679–1701), by Wang Kai, Metropolitan Museum of Art, New York.

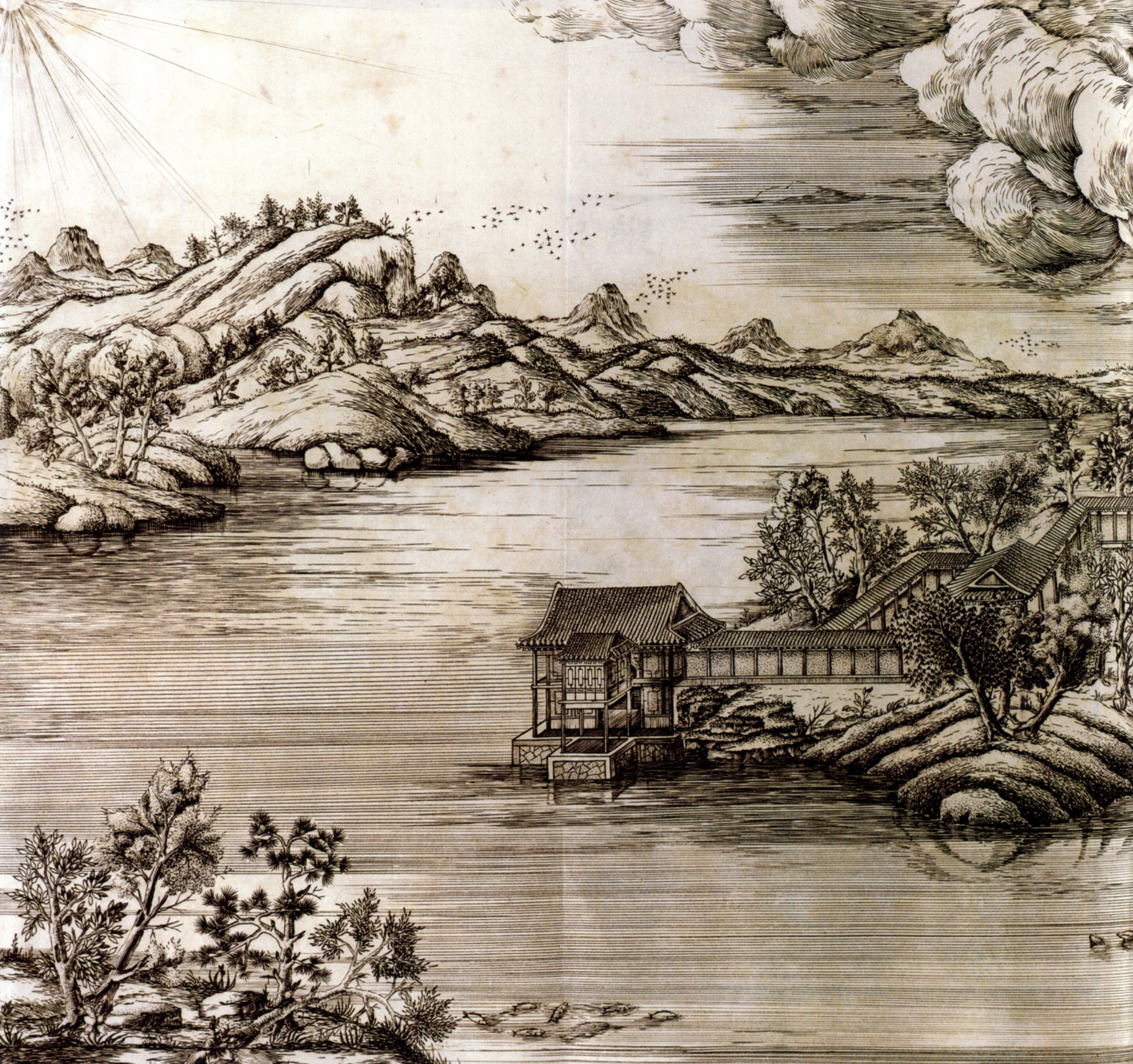
Morning Shine on the Western Ridge (1714-1715), by Matteo Ripa, National Palace Museum, Taipei.

In modern times, Chinese printing continued the tradition begun in medieval times. Black-and-white woodcuts were generally replaced by coloured ones, achieved by printing successive runs with different inks.

Between the end of the 16th and the beginning of the 17th century, three—and five—colour prints appeared. The oldest surviving print is the Ten Bamboo Studio Manual of Calligraphy and Paintings (1644) by Hu Zhengyan, of which there are several copies in various museums and collections. It is still commonly reproduced in China today and its images are very popular: it includes landscapes, flowers, animals, reproductions of jades, bronzes, porcelain and other objects.

Another outstanding series is the collection of twenty-nine Kaempfer Prints (British Museum, London), brought in 1693 by a German physician from China to Europe, which includes flowers, fruits, birds, insects and ornamental motifs reminiscent of the style of Kangxi ceramics. Equally famous is the compilation Manual of the Mustard Seed Garden, published in two parts between 1679 and 1701.

It was initiated by the scholar and landscape painter Wáng Gài and expanded and prefaced by the art critic Li Yu and the landscape painter Wáng Niè. It was noted for the quality of its polychrome and drawings, which influenced Qing painting.

=== Goryeo (Korea) ===
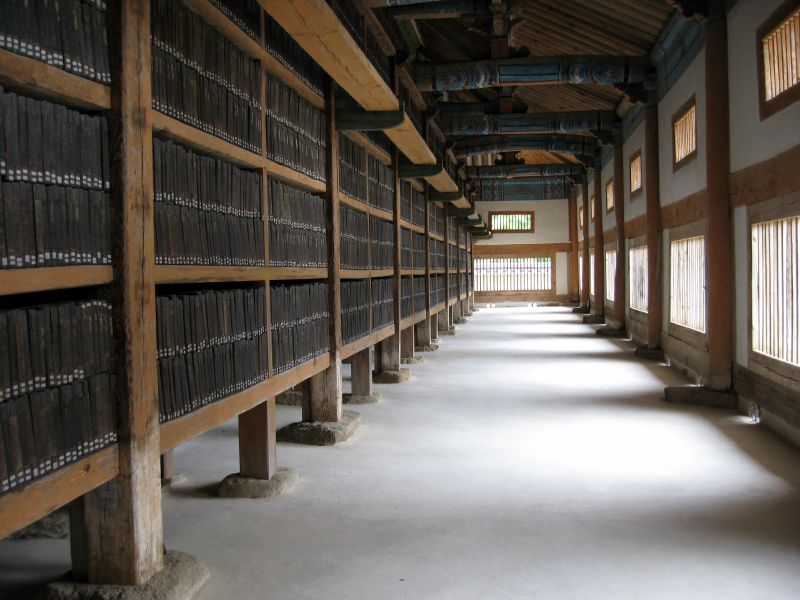
Tripitaka Koreana stored at Haeinsa is one of the foremost Chogye Buddhist temples in South Korea.

In 989 Seongjong of Goryeo sent the monk Yeoga to request from the Song a copy of the complete Buddhist canon. The request was granted in 991 when Seongjong's official Han Eongong visited the Song court. In 1011, Hyeonjong of Goryeo issued the carving of their own set of the Buddhist canon, which would come to be known as the Goryeo Daejanggyeong. The project was suspended in 1031 after Heyongjong's death, but work resumed again in 1046 after Munjong's accession to the throne. The completed work, amounting to some 6,000 volumes, was finished in 1087. Unfortunately the original set of woodblocks was destroyed in a conflagration during the Mongol invasion of 1232. King Gojong ordered another set to be created and work began in 1237, this time only taking 12 years to complete. In 1248 the complete Goryeo Daejanggyeong numbered 81,258 printing blocks, 52,330,152 characters, 1496 titles, and 6568 volumes. Due to the stringent editing process that went into the Goryeo Daejanggyeong and its surprisingly enduring nature, having survived completely intact over 760 years, it is considered the most accurate of Buddhist canons written in Classical Chinese as well as a standard edition for East Asian Buddhist scholarship.

=== Japan ===
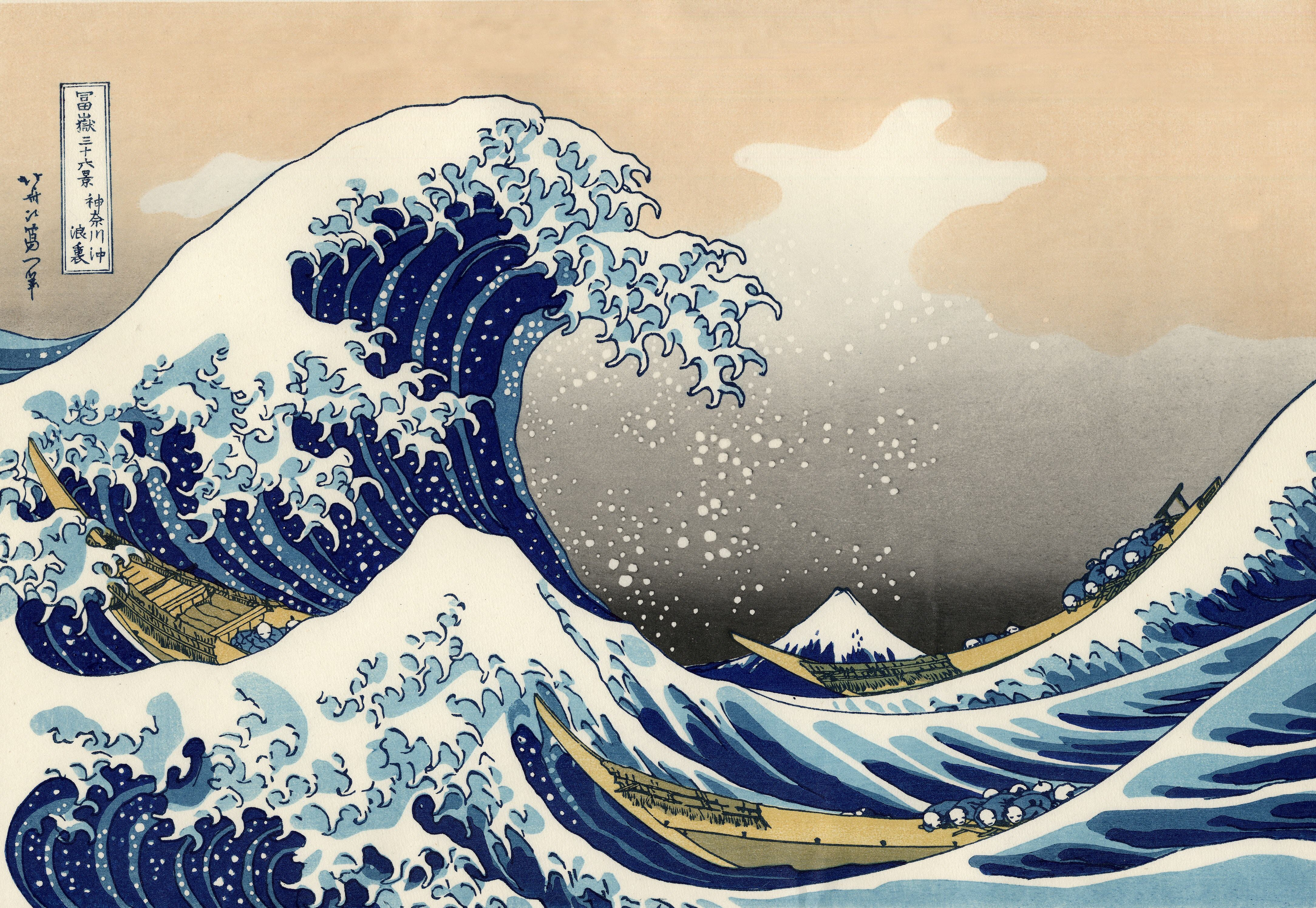
Under the Wave off Kanagawa by Hokusai, a ukiyo-e artist

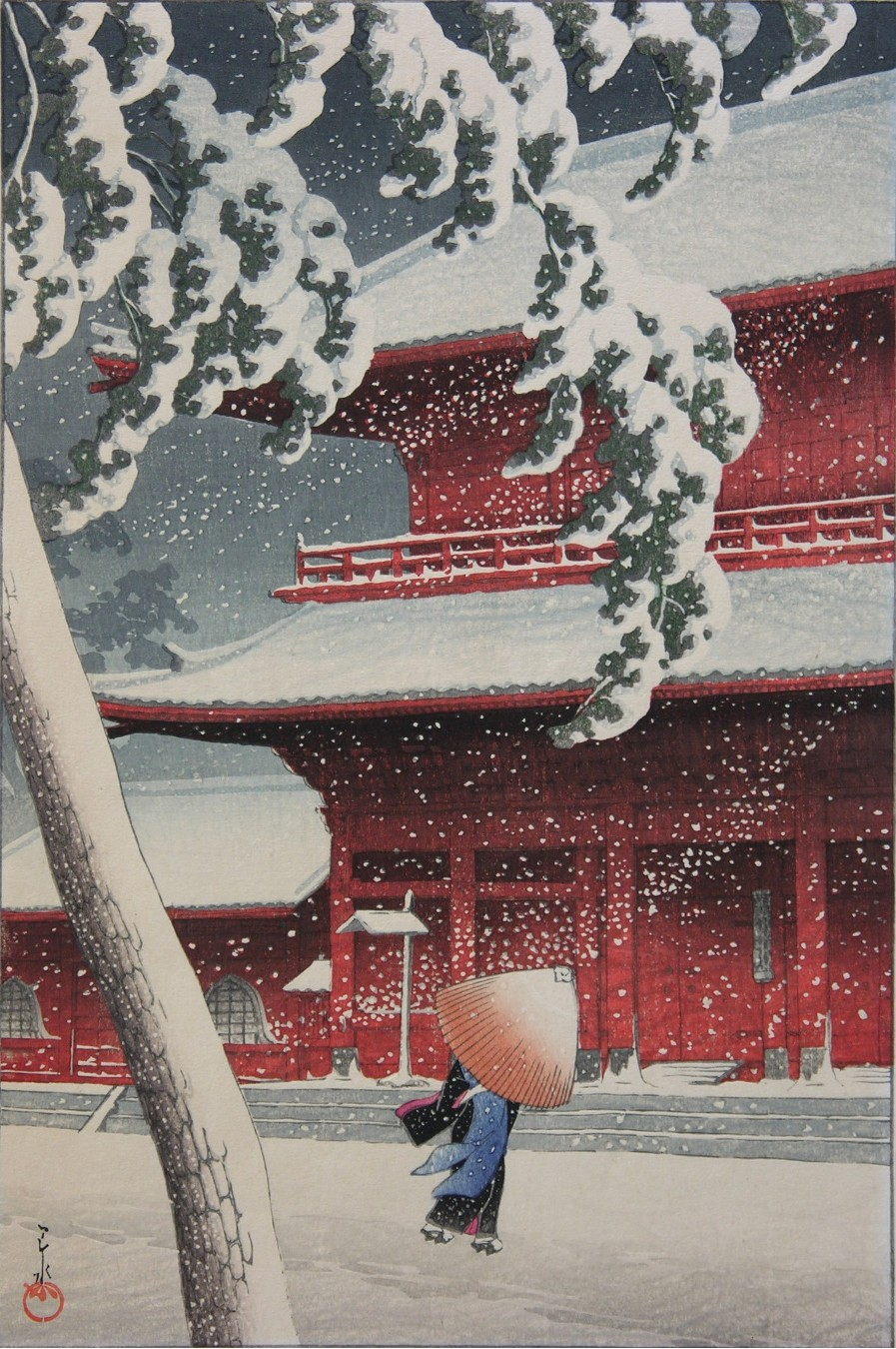
Zōjō-ji in Shiba. From series Twenty Views of Tōkyō by Hasui Kawase, a shin-hanga artist.

In the Kamakura period from the 12th century to the 13th century, many books were printed and published by woodblock printing at Buddhist temples in Kyoto and Kamakura.

The mass production of woodblock prints in the Edo period was due to the high literacy rate of Japanese people. The literacy rate of the Japanese by 1800 was almost 100% for the samurai class and 50% to 60% for the chōnin and nōmin (farmer) class due to the spread of private schools (terakoya). There were more than 600 rental bookstores in Edo, and people lent woodblock-printed illustrated books of various genres. The content of these books varied widely, including travel guides, gardening books, cookbooks, kibyōshi (satirical novels), sharebon (books on urban culture), kokkeibon (comical books), ninjōbon (romance novel), yomihon, kusazōshi, art books, play scripts for the kabuki and jōruri (puppet) theatre, etc. The best-selling books of this period were Kōshoku Ichidai Otoko (Life of an Amorous Man) by Ihara Saikaku, Nansō Satomi Hakkenden by Takizawa Bakin, and Tōkaidōchū Hizakurige by Jippensha Ikku, and these books were reprinted many times.

From the 17th century to the 19th century, ukiyo-e depicting secular subjects became very popular among the common people and were mass-produced. ukiyo-e is based on kabuki actors, sumo wrestlers, beautiful women, landscapes of sightseeing spots, historical tales, and so on, and Hokusai and Hiroshige are the most famous artists. In the 18th century, Suzuki Harunobu established the technique of multicolour woodblock printing called nishiki-e and greatly developed Japanese woodblock printing culture such as ukiyo-e. Ukiyo-e influenced European Japonisme and Impressionism. In the early 20th century, shin-hanga that fused the tradition of ukiyo-e with the techniques of Western paintings became popular, and the works of Hasui Kawase and Hiroshi Yoshida gained international popularity.

=== Islamic world ===
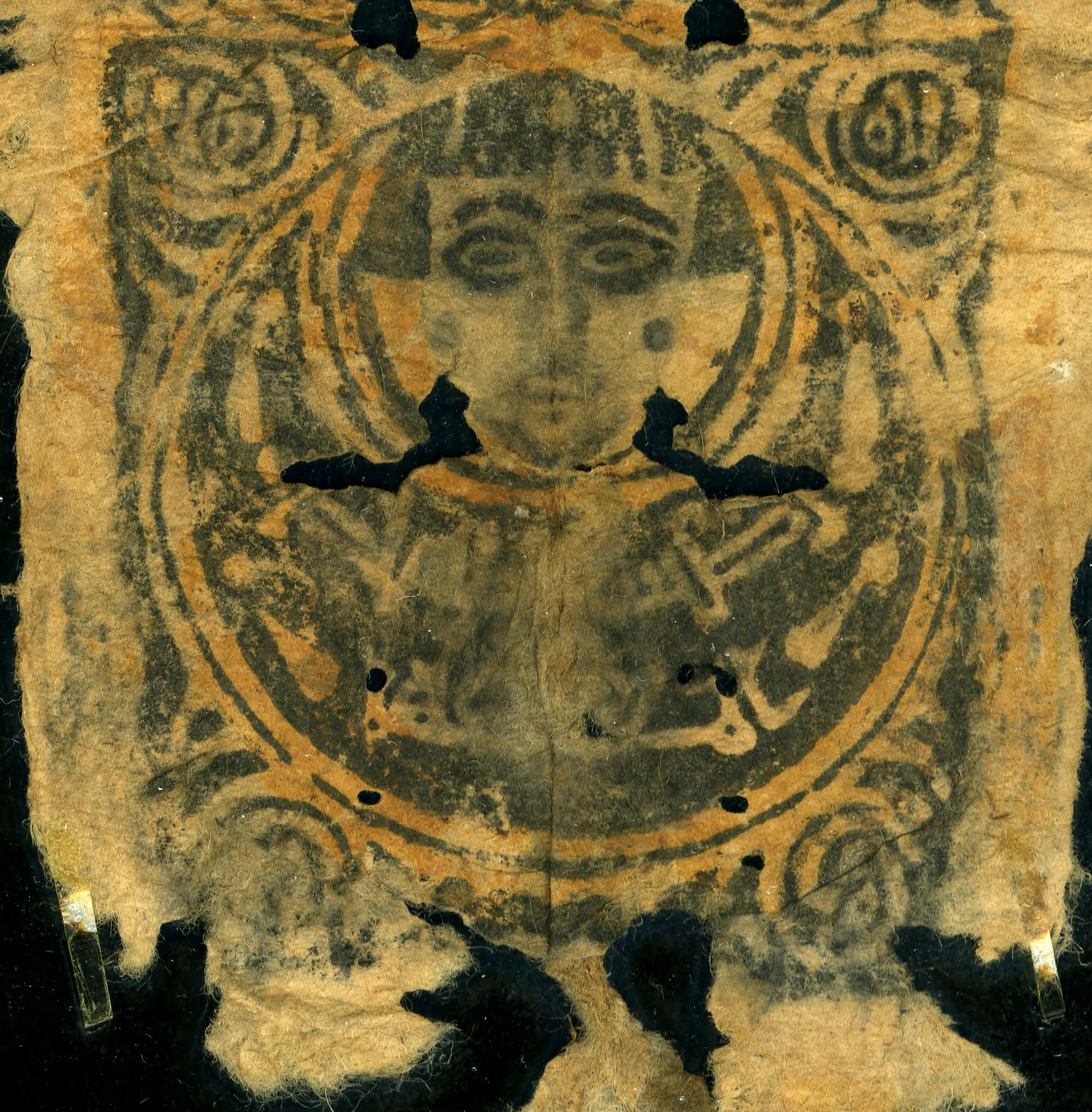
A head within a crescent at the bottom of a talisman, reminiscent Fatimid manuscript illustrations.

Between 900 and 1444, the Islamic world utilized a wood block printing technique called ṭarsh. From the 13th century onwards, tin and lead matrices were also used. It is unclear whether the technique spread from China or was independently developed. Its presence in 10th century Muslim Spain represents Europe's first known encounter with the craft.

The majority of extant specimens and historical accounts of this printing technique focus on the production of protective amulets and talismans. Most of these are long and narrow, averaging around 18 by 7 cm, intended to be folded up and hung around the neck, featuring Qur'anic verses, invocations, numerology and magical symbols. Printing of these talismans was a minority enterprise by street magicians and tricksters known as the Banū Sāsān or Ghurabā', keeping the printing process secret to convince illiterate clients that they were hand-written. This secrecy may be a factor in the lack of its widespread adoption

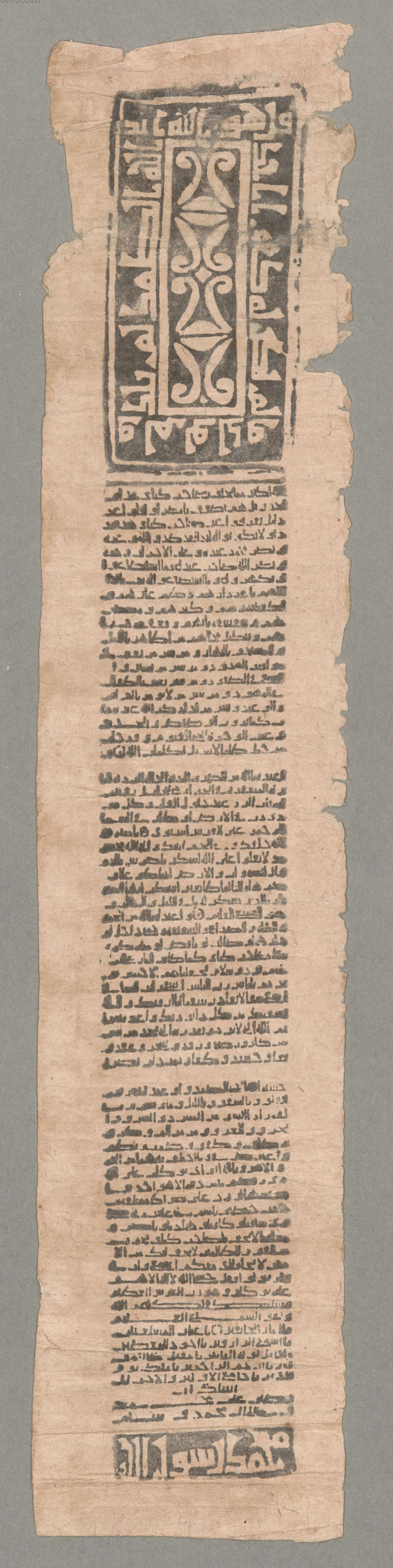
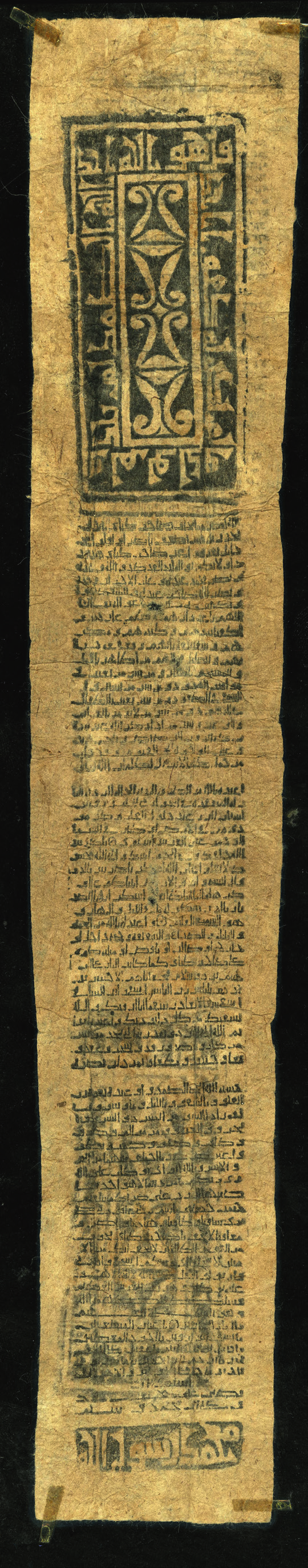
2 copies of some of the earliest Arabic blockprints, showing degradation of the matrix between prints.

Around 100 of these block prints have survived, often much more ornate than handmade alternatives. The prints make use of Arabic calligraphy and sometimes Hebrew, Syriac and Coptic. While black was the most common colour, occasionally coloured inks such as red, yellow and green were also used. Multiple blocks could be used, not just for decoration and different scripts, but also for different themes of the text, suggesting a level of modularity, tailoring the amulet to the needs of the client. The level of technical skill the craft reached is shown by scale of the lettering, ranging from 3 cm to just 1 mm in height.

Printed Hajj Certificates with elaborate illustrations are the second most common group of surviving prints. These were found in Damascus and were printed from 1210 for a few decades, becoming especially popular in the second quarter of the 13th century when only printed certificates were being produced, before reducing in quality under the Mamluks vanishing entirely by the 14th century. These ranged in size from 112 by 23.5 cm at the smallest to monumental certificates over 210 by 50 cm. Block printing was used in every aspect of the design, from text and decorative elements to the visual depictions of the various rites and sacred sites of the Hajj. Larger certificates required illustrations to be split across many print blocks. Printed certificates surpassed their handcrafted counterparts in quality and harmoniousness, such that they were commissioned for some of the most elite figures of 13th century Syria, including the Ayyubid Sultans themselves.

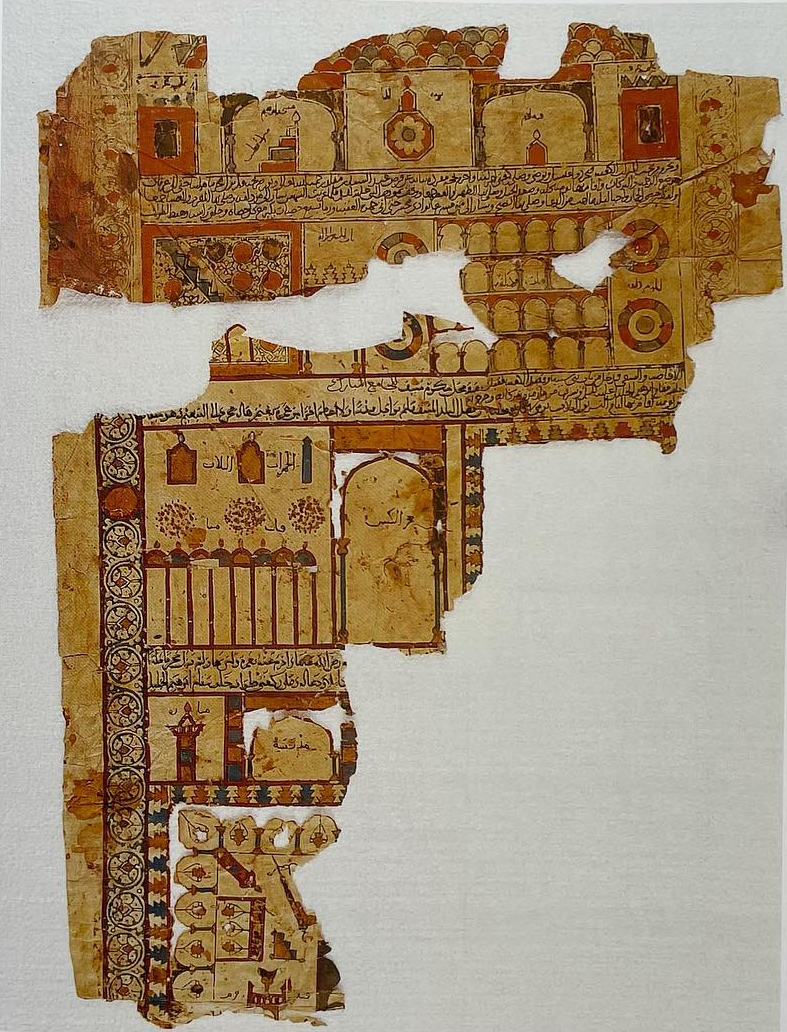
Fragments of 3 identical monumental printed hajj certificates (210cm x 50cm) from 1239-1242, Damascus

It was also used by the state, such as to stamp Fatimid tax receipts or commercial goods at the warehouse of Almería in 1349 as well as to print Almohad imperial decrees, or for the Ilkhanate's printing of paper money in 1294. In 1436-1444 a highly ornate 124.6 cm talisman was printed, the longest extant, but after this block printing vanishes from the Islamic world without explanation, and it was entirely forgotten by the time of its late 19th century discovery. However, Egyptian Romani Ghurabā' migrating to Central Europe at the start of the 15th century may have played a role in the transmission of block printing to Europe.

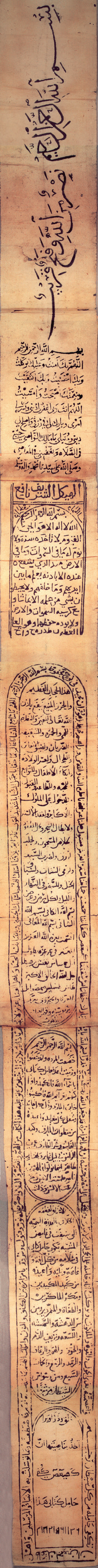
The last known Tarsh print.

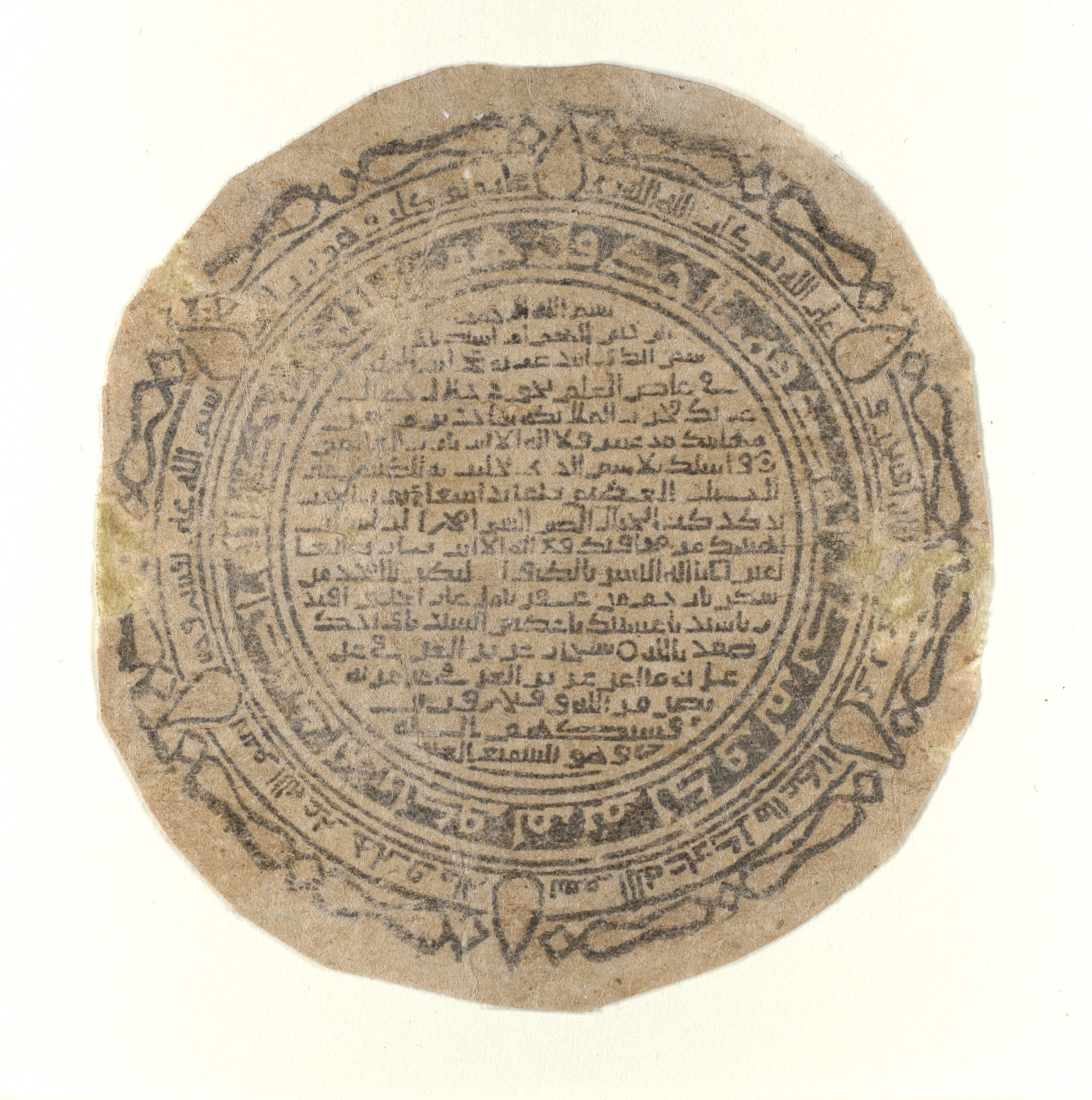
A circular print with minuscule 1mm high text

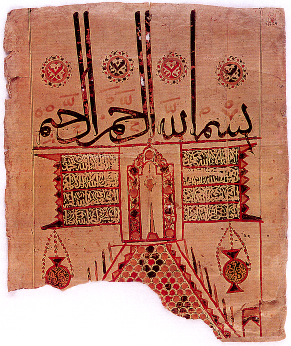
A monumental hajj certificate from 1242-1258

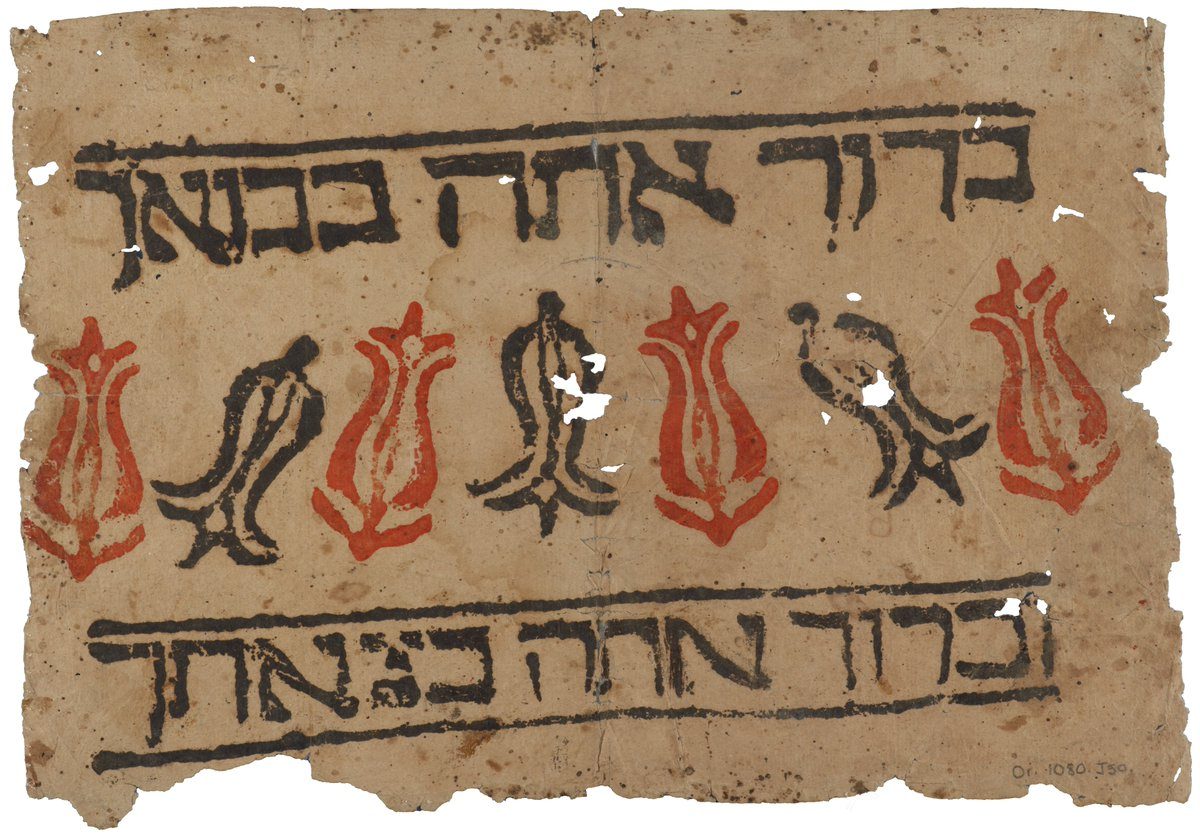
A Hebrew print, late 1300s

=== India ===
In India the main importance of the technique has always been as a method of printing textiles, which has been a large industry since at least the 10th century. Nowadays wooden block printing is commonly used for creating beautiful textiles, such as block print saree, kurta, curtains, kurtis, dress, shirts, cotton sarees.

=== Europe ===
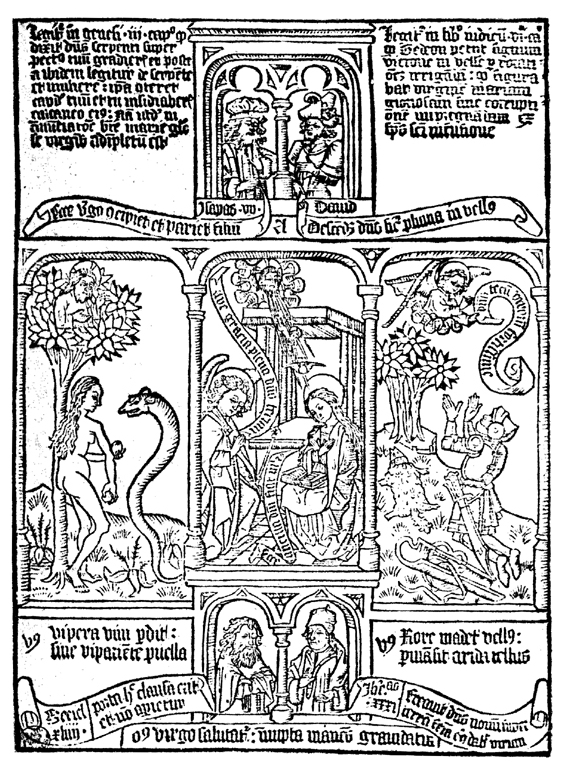
Three episodes from the block book Biblia pauperum illustrating typological correspondences between the Old and New Testaments: Eve and the serpent, the Annunciation, Gideon's miracle

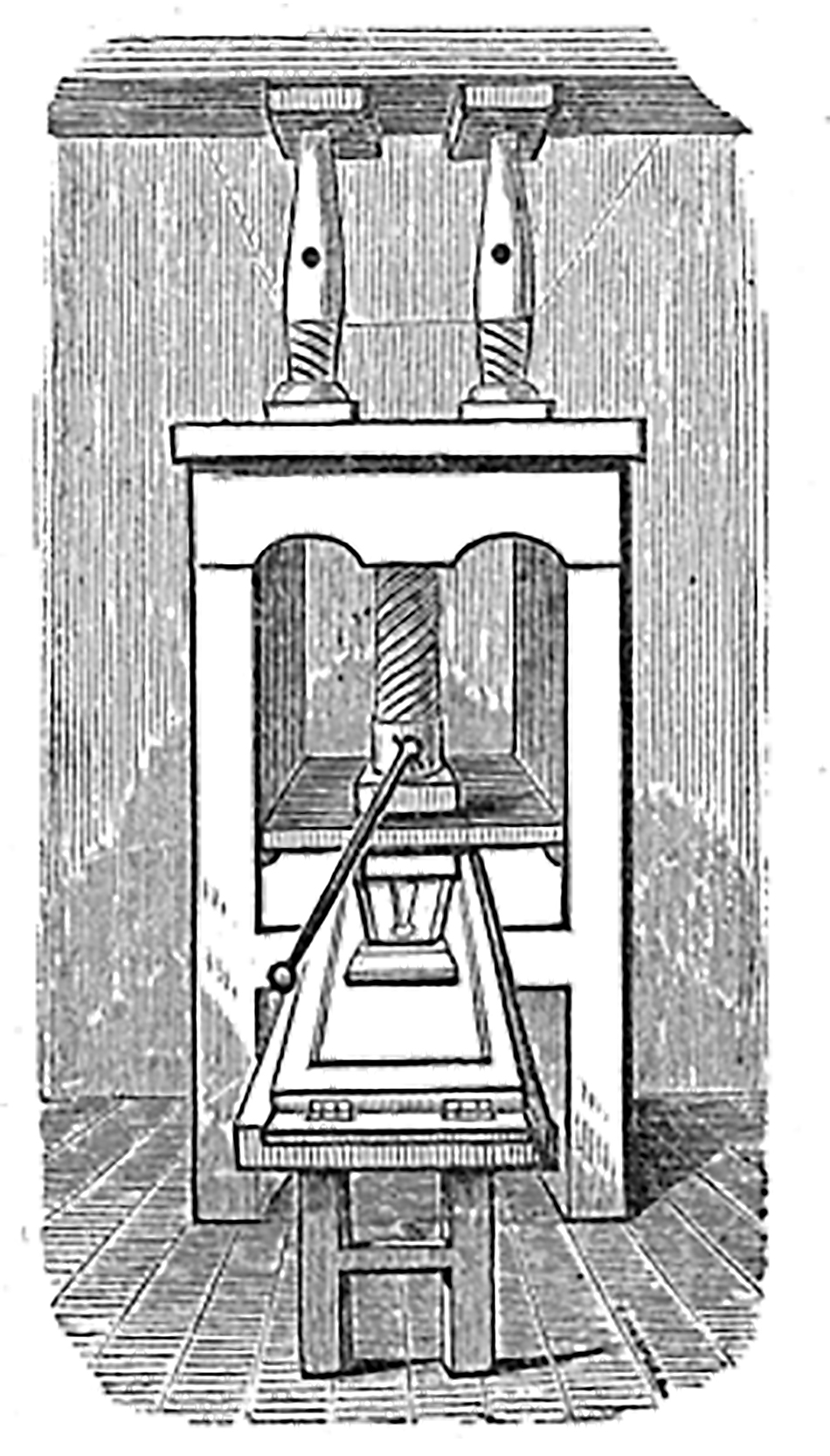
Western woodcut press, 1872

Woodblock printing was used for textile patterns in Europe by the mid-14th century and for images on sheets by the end of the century. Block books, where both text and images are cut on a single block for a whole page, appeared in Europe in the mid-15th century. Block prints were produced in southern Germany and Venice and across central Europe between 1400 and 1450. They were all religious in nature and most of them are undated, but they are believed to have been produced in the late 14th and early 15th centuries. They were printed as outlines and filled in with color manually by hand or stencil. As they were almost always undated, and without statement of printer or place of printing, determining their dates of printing has been an extremely difficult task. Allan H. Stevenson, by comparing the watermarks in the paper used in block books with watermarks in dated documents, concluded that the "heyday" of block books was the 1460s, but that at least one dated from about 1451. Block books printed in the 1470s were often of cheaper quality, as a cheaper alternative to books printed by printing press. Block books continued to be printed sporadically up through the end of the 15th century. This method was also used extensively for printing playing cards.

The origin of woodblock printing in Europe is disputed. Some believe it was a native innovation while others believe it came from China. There is no hard evidence that Chinese printing technology spread to Europe. However a number of authors have advanced theories in favor of a Chinese origin for European printing based on early references and circumstantial evidence. Tsien suggests that woodblock printing may have spread from China to Europe due to communications during the Mongol Empire era and based on similarities between blockprints in both areas. He suggests that European missionaries to China during the 14th century could have borrowed the practice of creating prints to be colored manually later on, which had been prevalent in China for a long time with Buddhist prints. The block books of Europe were produced using methods and materials similar to those in China and sometimes in ways contrary to prevailing European norms: European wood blocks were cut parallel with the grain in the same way as the Chinese method rather than the prevailing European practice of cutting across the grain, water-based ink was used rather than oil-based ink, only one side of the paper was printed rather than both, and rubbing rather than pressure was employed to leave the print. Robert Curzon, 14th Baron Zouche (1810 – 1873) held the opinion that European and Chinese block books were so similar in every way that they must have originated in China.

The question of whether printing originated in Europe or China was raised in the early 16th century by a Portuguese poet, Garcia de Resende (1470 – 1536). Paolo Giovio (1483 – 1552), an Italian historian who had come into possession of several Chinese books and maps through João de Barros (1496 – 1570), claimed that printing was invented in China and spread to Europe through Russia. Juan González de Mendoza (1545 – 1618) made similar claims about printing coming from China through Russia but also added another route through Arabia by sea and that it influenced Johannes Gutenberg. Several other authors throughout the 16th century repeated such statements.

Joseph P. McDermott disputes the theory of Chinese printing being transmitted to Europe and emphasizes the lack of evidence. Although the Mongols planned to use printed paper currency in Persia, the scheme failed shortly thereafter. No books were printed in Persia before the 19th century and Chinese prints apparently made little impact on the region. There are no surviving printed playing cards from the Middle East while pre-1450 printed cards from medieval Europe contained no text. Although some elite Europeans were aware of printed paper money by the late 13th century, the earliest evidence that Europeans were aware of Chinese book printing only appeared in the early 16th century. McDermott argues that modern comparisons of techniques used in European and Chinese block books are ahistorical and that rather than direct transmission of technique, similarities between them were just as likely the result of convergent evolution.

More recently, Kristina Richardson has argued that the technology may have entered Europe at the hands of Egyptian Romani. Since the woodblock printing of Egypt was mainly carried out by a Romani group known as the Ghurabā', and migrations of Egyptian Romani into Bavaria and Bohemia at the start of the 15th century is attested in many sources. Beyond that, there are similarities between the tarsh and early European woodcuts, in that both focus on religious iconography, producing single sided prints with a red, brown, yellow and green colour scheme.

=== Impact of movable type ===
==== China ====
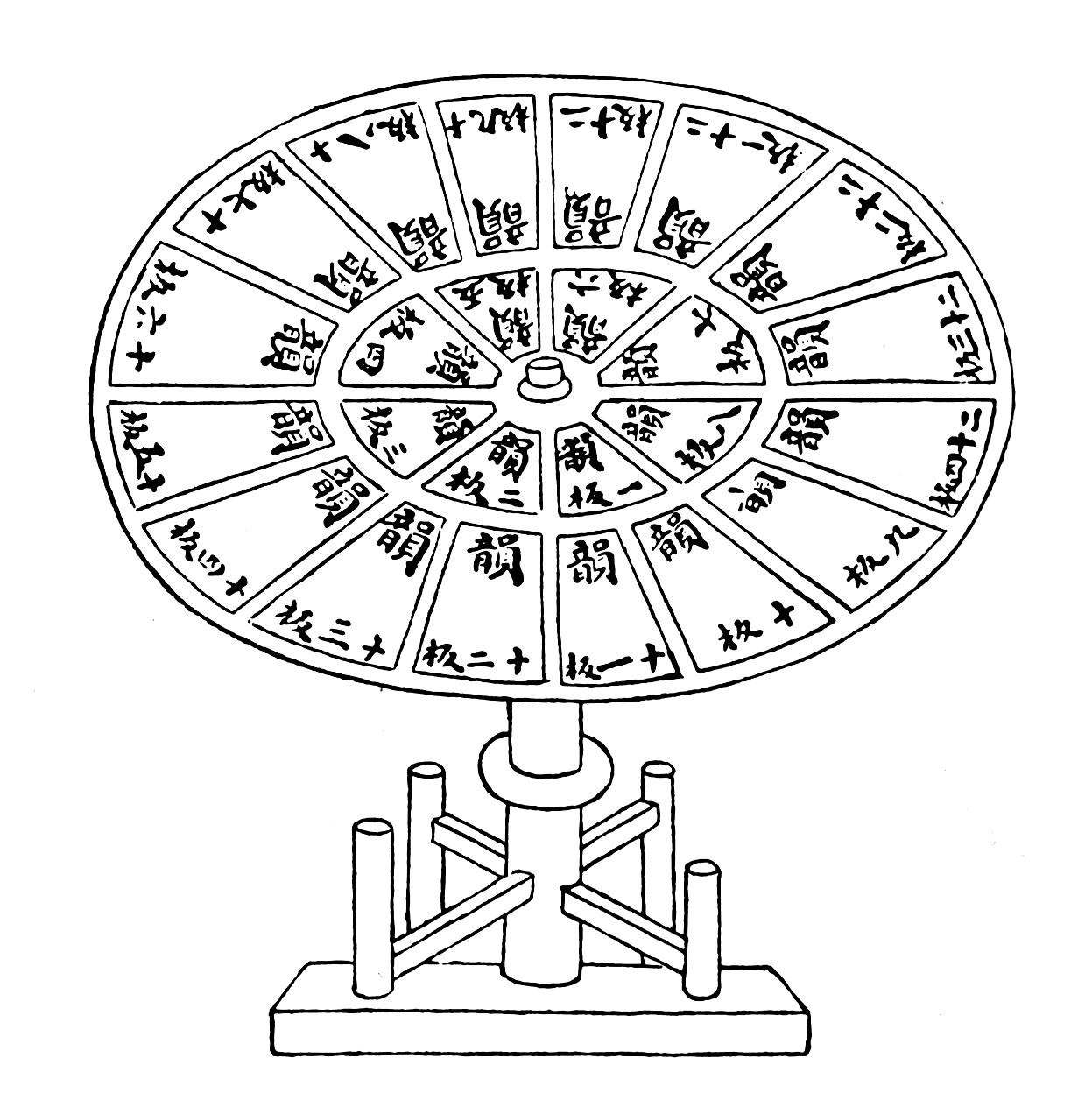
A revolving table typecase with individual movable type characters arranged primarily by rhyming scheme, from Wang Zhen's Nong Shu, published 1313.

Ceramic and wooden movable type were invented in the Northern Song dynasty around the year 1041 by the commoner Bi Sheng. Metal movable type also appeared in the Southern Song dynasty. The earliest extant book printed using movable type is the Auspicious Tantra of All-Reaching Union, printed in Western Xia c. 1139–1193. Metal movable type was used in the Song, Jin, and Yuan dynasties for printing banknotes. The invention of movable type did not have an immediate effect on woodblock printing and it never supplanted it in East Asia.

Only during the Ming and Qing dynasties did wooden and metal movable types see any considerable use, but the preferred method remained woodblock. Usage of movable type in China never exceeded 10 percent of all printed materials while 90 percent of printed books used the older woodblock technology. In one case an entire set of wooden type numbering 250,000 pieces was used for firewood. Woodblocks remained the dominant printing method in China until the introduction of lithography in the late 19th century.

Traditionally it has been assumed that the prevalence of woodblock printing in East Asia as a result of Chinese characters led to the stagnation of printing culture and enterprise in that region. S. H. Steinberg describes woodblock printing in his Five Hundred Years of Printing as having "outlived their usefulness" and their printed material as "cheap tracts for the half-literate, [...] which anyway had to be very brief because of the laborious process of cutting the letters". John Man's The Gutenberg Revolution makes a similar case: "wood-blocks were even more demanding than manuscript pages to make, and they wore out and broke, and then you had to carve another one – a whole page at a time".

Commentaries on printing in China from the 1990s on, which cite contemporary European observers with first-hand knowledge, complicate the traditional narrative. T. H. Barrett points out that only Europeans who had never seen Chinese woodblock printing in action tended to dismiss it, perhaps due to the almost instantaneous arrival of both xylography and movable type in Europe. The early Jesuit missionaries of late-16th-century China, for instance, had a similar distaste for wood-based printing for very different reasons. These Jesuits found that "the cheapness and omnipresence of printing in China made the prevailing wood-based technology extremely disturbing, even dangerous". Matteo Ricci made note of "the exceedingly large numbers of books in circulation here and the ridiculously low prices at which they are sold". Two hundred years later the Englishman John Barrow, by way of the Macartney mission to Qing China, also remarked with some amazement that the printing industry was "as free as in England, and the profession of printing open to everyone". The commercial success and profitability of woodblock printing was attested to by one British observer at the end of the nineteenth century, who noted that even before the arrival of western printing methods, the price of books and printed materials in China had already reached an astoundingly low price compared to what could be found in his home country. Of this, he said:

We have an extensive penny literature at home, but the English cottager cannot buy anything like the amount of printed matter for his penny that the Chinaman can for even less. A penny Prayer-book, admittedly sold at a loss, cannot compete in mass of matter with many of the books to be bought for a few cash in China. When it is considered, too, that a block has been laboriously cut for each leaf, the cheapness of the result is only accounted for by the wideness of sale.

Other modern scholars such as Endymion Wilkinson hold a more conservative and skeptical view. While Wilkinson does not deny "China's dominance in book production from the fourth to the fifteenth century," he also insists that arguments for the Chinese advantage "should not be extended either forwards or backwards in time."

European book production began to catch up with China after the introduction of the mechanical printing press in the mid fifteenth century. Reliable figures of the number of imprints of each edition are as hard to find in Europe as they are in China, but one result of the spread of printing in Europe was that public and private libraries were able to build up their collections and for the first time in over a thousand years they began to match and then overtake the largest libraries in China.

— Endymion Wilkinson

===== Decline of woodblock printing in China =====
During the 16th and 17th centuries, printmaking enjoyed great popularity, especially in the illustration of books such as Buddhist texts, poems, novels, biographies, medical treatises, music, etc. The major center of production was initially in Kien-ngan (Fujian) and, from the 17th century, in Sin-ngan (Anhui) and Nanjing (Jiangsu). On the other hand, in the 18th century, the industry began to decline, with stereotyped images. This coincided with the arrival of European missionaries who introduced Western engraving techniques. The Jesuit Matteo Ripa edited in 1714–1715 a series of poems by Emperor Kangxi, which he illustrated with landscapes of the imperial summer residence at Jehol. During the reign of Emperor Qianlong the one hundred and four maps of the Chinese Empire made by Jesuit missionaries were printed, as well as illustrations of his military victories, which he commissioned in Paris from the engraver Charles-Nicolas Cochin (Conquests of the Emperor of China, 1767–1773). The emperor himself commissioned the Jesuits to instruct Chinese artisans in the intaglio technique, but they did not obtain good results. Already in the 19th century, the growing xenophobia against Europeans was progressively relegating the use of engraving in China.

In the 20th century, the genre was revived by the writer Lou Siun, who founded a woodcut school in Shanghai in 1930. Influenced by contemporary Russian engraving, this school dealt especially with popular, agricultural and military subjects for propaganda purposes, as is evident in the work of P'an Jeng and Huang Yong-yu.

==== Korea ====
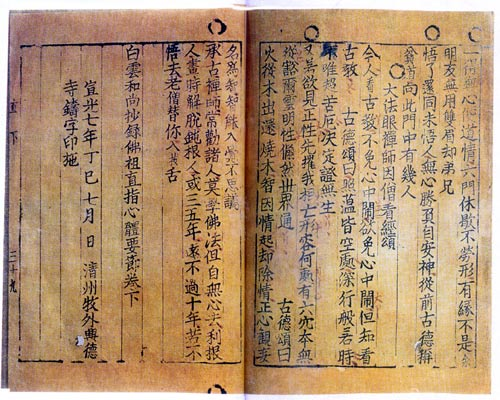
Jikji: Selected Teachings of Buddhist Sages and Seon Masters, the earliest known book printed with movable metal type, 1377. Bibliothèque Nationale de France, Paris

In 1234, cast metal movable type was used in Goryeo (Korea) to print the 50-volume Prescribed Texts for Rites of the Past and Present, compiled by Ch'oe Yun-ŭi, but no copies survived to the present. The oldest extant book printed with movable metal type is the Jikji of 1377. This form of metal movable type was described by the French scholar Henri-Jean Martin as "extremely similar to Gutenberg's".

Movable type never replaced woodblock printing in Korea. Indeed, even the promulgation of Hangeul was done through woodblock prints. The general assumption is that movable type did not replace block printing in places that used Chinese characters due to the expense of producing more than 200,000 individual pieces of type. Even woodblock printing was not as cost productive as simply paying a copyist to write out a book by hand if there was no intention of producing more than a few copies. Although Sejong the Great introduced Hangeul, an alphabetic system, in the 15th century, Hangeul only replaced Hanja in the 20th century. And unlike China, the movable type system was kept mainly within the confines of a highly stratified elite Korean society:

Korean printing with movable metallic type developed mainly within the royal foundry of the Yi dynasty. Royalty kept a monopoly of this new technique and by royal mandate suppressed all non-official printing activities and any budding attempts at commercialization of printing. Thus, printing in early Korea served only the small, noble groups of the highly stratified society.

— Sohn Pow-Key

==== Japan ====
The western style movable type printing-press was brought to Japan by the Tenshō embassy in 1590, and was first printed in Kazusa, Nagasaki in 1591. However, western printing-presses were discontinued after the ban on Christianity in 1614. The movable type printing-press seized from Korea by Toyotomi Hideyoshi's forces in 1593 was also in use at the same time as the printing press from Europe. An edition of the Confucian Analects was printed in 1598, using a Korean moveable type printing press, at the order of Emperor Go-Yōzei.

Tokugawa Ieyasu established a printing school at Enko-ji in Kyoto and started publishing books using domestic wooden movable type printing-press instead of metal from 1599. Ieyasu supervised the production of 100,000 types, which were used to print many political and historical books. In 1605, books using domestic copper movable type printing-press began to be published, but copper type did not become mainstream after Ieyasu died in 1616.

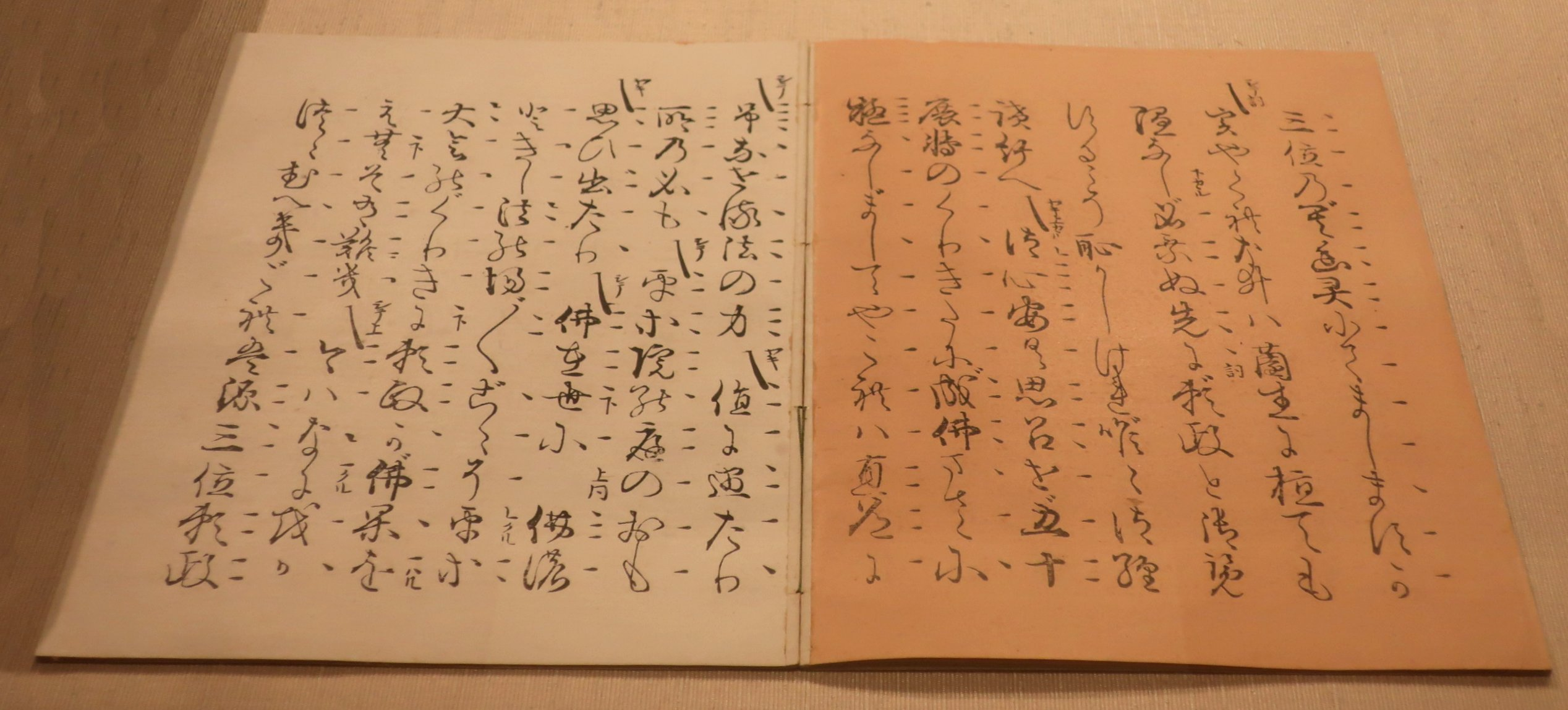
Saga-bon (嵯峨本, Saga Books): libretto for the Noh play Katsuragi by Hon'ami Kōetsu. The Saga-bon is one of the earliest works produced on a movable type press in Japan.

The great pioneers in applying movable type printing press to the creation of artistic books, and in preceding mass production for general consumption, were Honami Kōetsu and Suminokura Soan. At their studio in Saga, Kyoto, the pair created a number of woodblock versions of the Japanese classics, both text and images, essentially converting emaki (handscrolls) to printed books, and reproducing them for wider consumption. These books, now known as Kōetsu Books, Suminokura Books, or Saga Books, are considered the first and finest printed reproductions of many of these classic tales; the Saga Book of the Tales of Ise (Ise monogatari), printed in 1608, is especially renowned. Saga Books were printed on expensive paper, and used various embellishments, being printed specifically for a small circle of literary connoisseurs. For aesthetic reasons, the typeface of the Saga-bon, like that of traditional handwritten books, adopted the renmen-tai (ja), in which several characters are written in succession with smooth brush strokes. As a result, a single typeface was sometimes created by combining two to four semi-cursive and cursive kanji or hiragana characters. In one book, 2,100 characters were created, but 16% of them were used only once.

Despite the appeal of moveable type, however, craftsmen soon decided that the semi-cursive and cursive script style of Japanese writings was better reproduced using woodblocks. By 1640 woodblocks were once again used for nearly all purposes. After the 1640s, movable type printing declined, and books were mass-produced by conventional woodblock printing during most of the Edo period. It was after the 1870s, during the Meiji period, when Japan opened the country to the West and began to modernize, that this technique was used again.

==== Middle East ====
In countries using Arabic scripts, works, especially the Qur'an were printed from blocks or by lithography in the 19th century, as the links between the characters require compromises when movable type is used which were considered inappropriate for sacred texts.

==== Europe ====
Around the mid-1400s, block-books, woodcut books with both text and images, usually carved in the same block, emerged as a cheaper alternative to manuscripts and books printed with movable type. These were all short heavily illustrated works, the bestsellers of the day, repeated in many different block-book versions: the Ars moriendi and the Biblia pauperum were the most common. There is still some controversy among scholars as to whether their introduction preceded or, the majority view, followed the introduction of movable type, with the range of estimated dates being between about 1440–1460.

== Technique ==
Jia xie is a method for dyeing textiles (usually silk) using wood blocks invented in the 5th–6th centuries in China. An upper and a lower block are made, with carved out compartments opening to the back, fitted with plugs. The cloth, usually folded a number of times, is inserted and clamped between the two blocks. By unplugging the different compartments and filling them with dyes of different colours, a multi-coloured pattern can be printed over quite a large area of folded cloth. The method is not strictly printing however, as the pattern is not caused by pressure against the block.

=== Colour woodblock printing ===
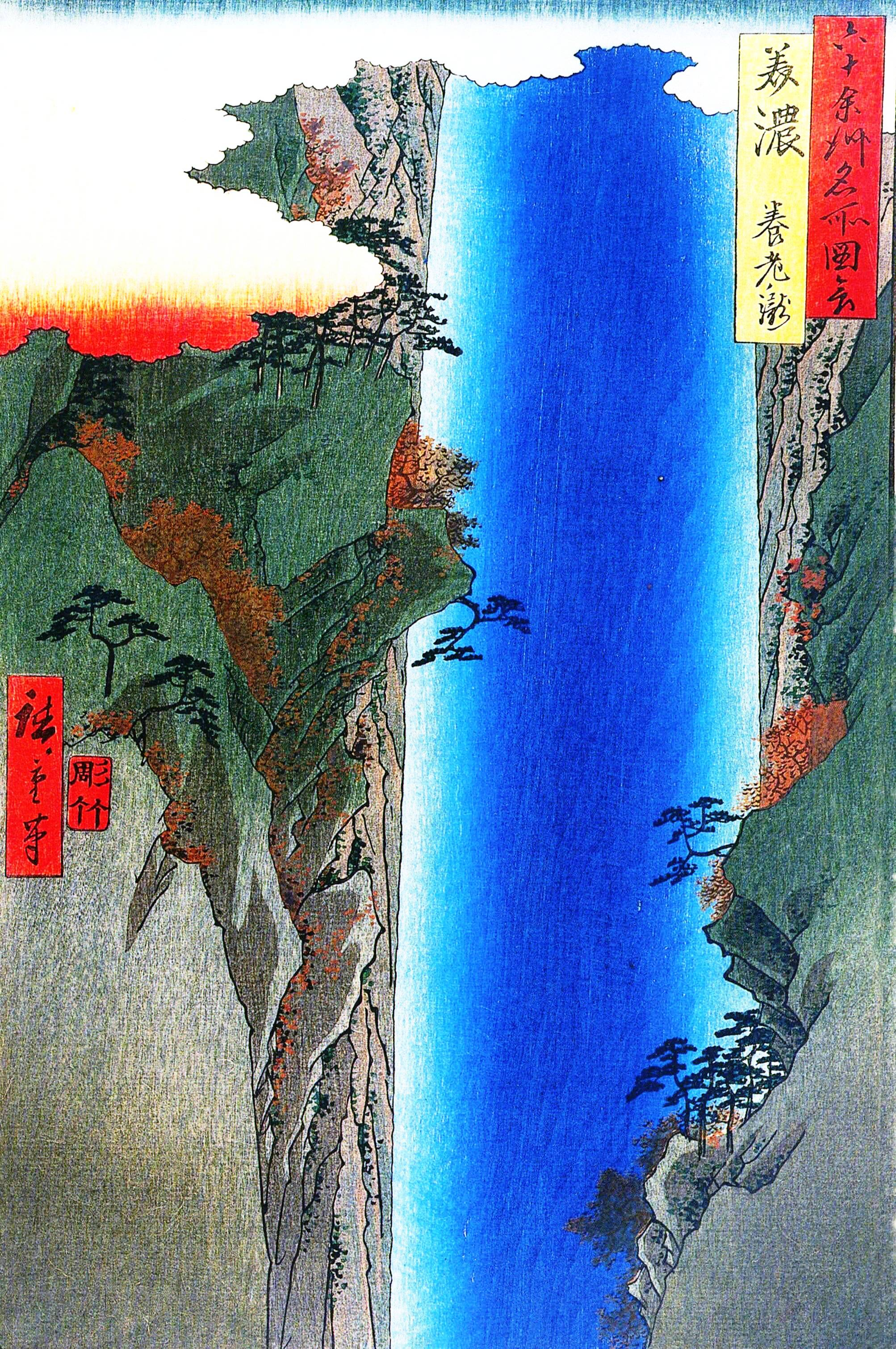
Mino province: Yoro-taki from the series Views of Famous Places in the Sixty-odd Provinces by Hiroshige, an ukiyo-e artist

The earliest woodblock printing known is in colour—Chinese silk from the Han dynasty printed in three colours.

Colour is very common in Asian woodblock printing on paper; in China the first known example is a Diamond sutra of 1341, printed in black and red at the Zifu Temple in modern-day Hubei province. The earliest dated book printed in more than 2 colours is Chengshi moyuan (Chinese: 程氏墨苑), a book on ink-cakes printed in 1606 and the technique reached its height in books on art published in the first half of the 17th century. Notable examples are the Hu Zhengyan's Treatise on the Paintings and Writings of the Ten Bamboo Studio of 1633, and the Mustard Seed Garden Painting Manual published in 1679 and 1701.

== See also ==
- Ajrak
- Banhua
- Old master print
- New Year picture
- Kalamkari
- Bagh Print
- Bagru Print
- Conservation and restoration of woodblock prints
- Dabu printing
