= Lianhuanhua =

Early 20th century palm-sized Chinese comic books

A Lianhuanhua Image from "Arrest of the Orchid"

Lianhuanhua (traditional Chinese: 連環畫; simplified Chinese: 连环画; pinyin: Liánhuánhuà) is a type of palm-size picture books of sequential drawings popular in China in the 20th century. It influenced modern manhua.

== Terminology ==
The name in Chinese essentially translates to "linked pictures" or "serial pictures". The books were called "lianhuanhua" or "lianhuan tuhua"; later the "tu" was omitted and the term "lianhuanhua" became standard. The official term lianhuanhua was not used until 1925 and was first employed by the Shanghai publishing company Shijie Shuju (World Book Company). Prior to this, lianhuanhua were separated into different name categories depending on the region.

| Location | English Meaning | Chinese Name |
|---|---|---|
| Shanghai | Little Book | Xiao Shu (小書) |
| Shanghai | Picture Book | Tuhua Shu (圖畫書) |
| Guangzhou and Hong Kong | Doll Book | Gongzai Shu (公仔書) |
| Wuhan | Children's Book | Yaya Shu (伢伢書) |
| Northern China | Kid's Book | Xiaoren Shu (小人書) |

== History ==
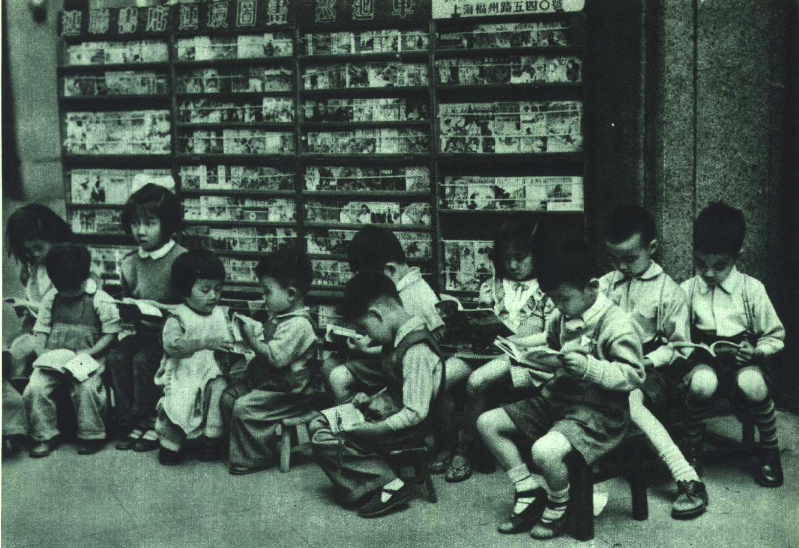
Children reading lianhuanhua before a shop in Shanghai, 1951.

In the 1880s, Chinese magazines such as Dianshizhai Pictorial experimented with the potential of this art technique. In 1884, ten illustrations to accompany a Korean rebellion narrative may be the earliest example of lianhuanhua. In 1899, Wenyi Book Company in Shanghai published the illustrated lithograph "The Story of the Three Kingdoms" drawn by Zhu Zhixuan. The format then was called "huihui tu" or chapter pictures.

In 1916 Caobao newspapers bound the pictures to attract a larger audience base of middle and lower class readers. The rise of lianhuanhua's popularity was proportional to the rise of lithographic printing introduced to Shanghai from the West. Shanghai comics journals in the 1920s featured more artwork, typically depicting traditional stories along the lines of Chinese mythology or Chinese folklore. Small publishers in the 1920s and 1930s were mostly located on a street called Beigongyili in the Zhabei district. In 1935 street book stall owners and publishers established the "Shanghai Lianhuan Tuhua Promotion Society" at Taoyuanli. The illustrated stories were originally targeted to children and marginally literate readers.

The books could be rented for a small fee in street kiosks. By the 1920s, lianhuanhua were also found in Hong Kong. These rental stores were common even during the Japanese occupation periods in the 1940s.

In Hong Kong during the 1970s, the format had essentially disappeared as they had become materials associated with the uneducated and unsophisticated.

Though lianhuanhua production decreased in mainland China during Cultural Revolution, many books were still produced. From the late 1970s to the early 1980s, lianhuanhua made a major comeback. As in previous eras of lianhuanhua production, the books cover a wide range of genres from historical tales and folklore to wuxia to thrillers, mystery and science-fiction, proliferating many different types and styles of books and artists.

Many of the books were also adaptations of other films or television shows.

During and after the Cultural Revolution, the communist party also adopted the medium for propaganda and education purposes.

From the late 1980s to the 1990s, demand for lianhuanhua decreased dramatically, and today, comic books such as manhua and translations of Japanese manga are much more popular than lianhuanhua.

Renmin Meishu Chubanshe (People's Fine Arts Publishing House), Shanghai Renmin Meishu Chubanshe (Shanghai People's Fine Arts Publishing House) and Tianjin People's Renmin Meishu Chubanshe (Tianjin People's Fine Arts Publishing House) have republished some of their popular lianhuanhua books.

== Present ==
Currently there is a resurgent interest in this format. The Shanghai Museum of Art has inaugurated a permanent exhibition of lianhuanhua as a popular grassroots form of fine art.

Lianhuanhua was adapted for animation in the 2024 video game Black Myth: Wukong.

== See also ==
- Banhua
- Chinese animation
- Comic strip
- Jiang Weipu, the "patron god" of lianhuanhua
- Manhua

=== Lists ===
- Lianhuanhua listed by year
