= New Year picture =

Chinese umbrella term for any printed art objects

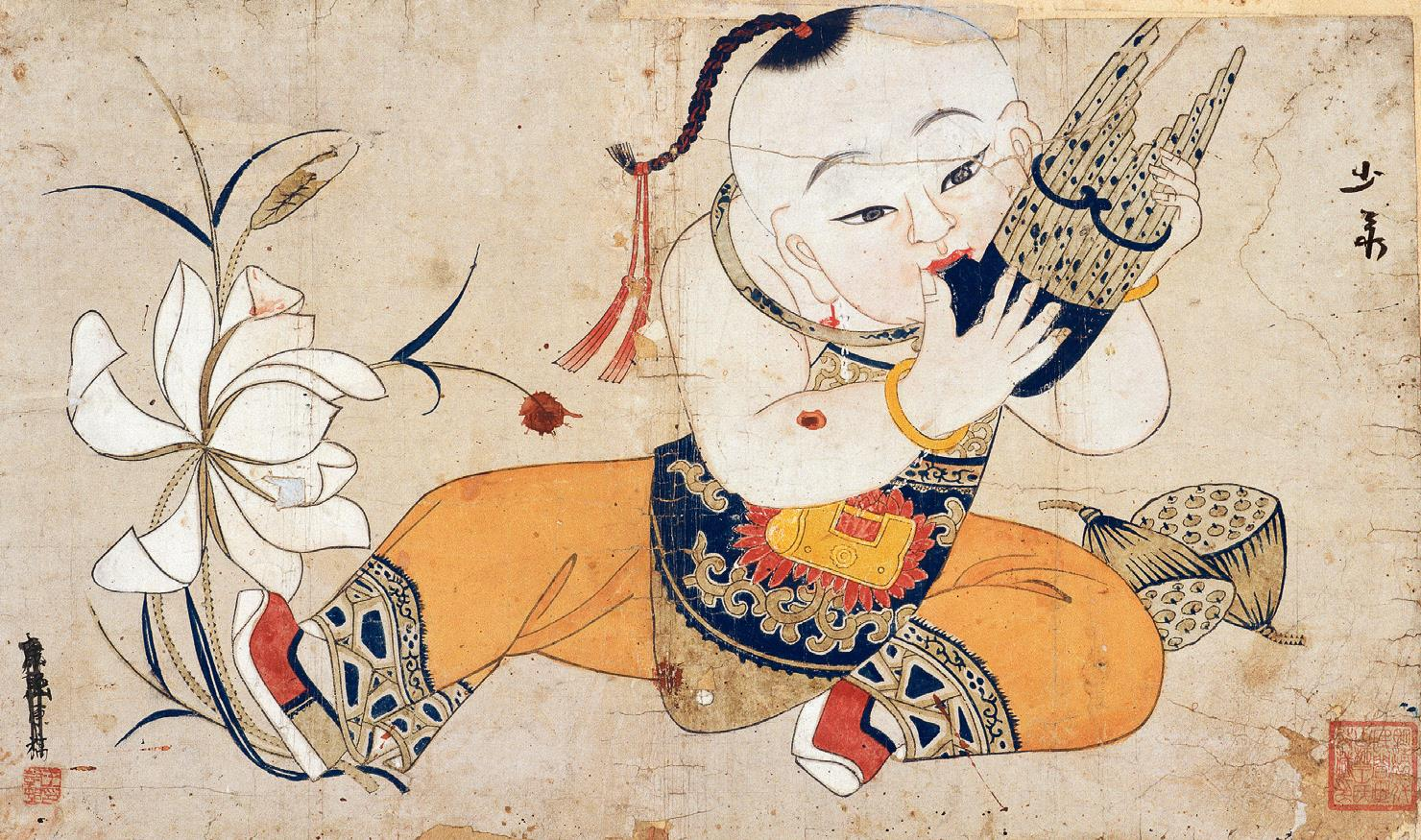
Honourable Offspring After Another. Yangliuqing New Year Picture. Kangxi Period (1661-1722). National Art Museum of China.

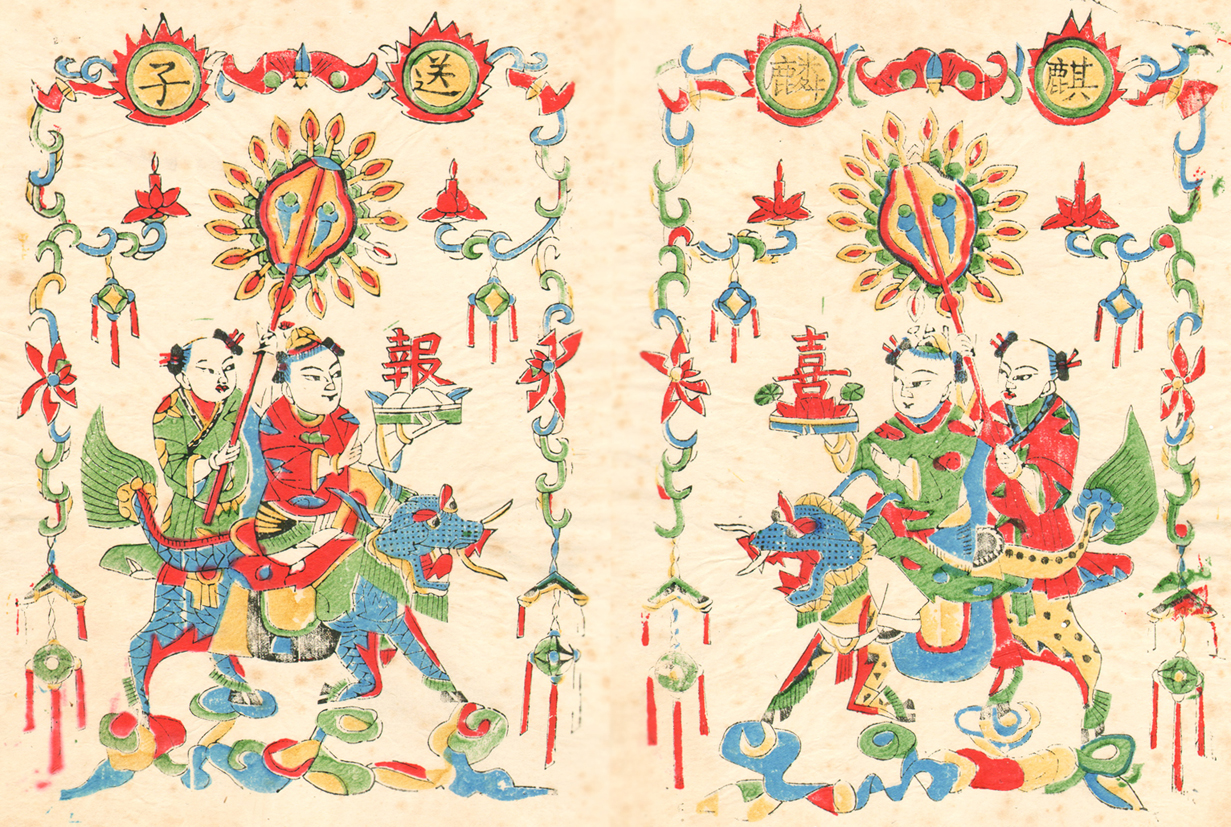
New Year picture of the Qing dynasty

A New Year picture (Chinese: 年画; pinyin: níanhùa) is a popular Banhua in China. It is a form of colored woodblock print, used for decoration and the performance of rituals during the Chinese New Year Holiday. In the 19th and 20th centuries some printers began to use the genre to depict current events.

== Background ==
The origins of the "New Year picture" are unknown, although the genre is thought to have begun with the printing of door gods during the Tang dynasty. By the 19th century door gods were joined by other household protective and auspicious deities including the Kitchen God, and the God of Wealth. Images of women and babies were common, as were depictions of New Year observances, popular narratives, and depictions of the theater. Customarily, as each Chinese New Year arrives, every family replaces its New Year picture in order to "say goodbye to the Past and welcome the Future" (Chinese: 辞旧迎新).

In the late-19th and early 20th century woodblock printers began to supplement traditional religious and folkloric themes with depictions of current events and modern themes including the Sino-French War, the First Sino-Japanese War, the Boxer Rebellion, and railways. These themes and events have no connection with the New Year, and so the appropriateness of the New Year Picture nomenclature is questionable. Nonetheless, all images created by traditional printers are typically categorized as such.

New Year pictures were printed throughout China. The best known production sites include Yangliuqing (Tianjin), Yangjiabu (Shandong), Wuqiang (Hebei), Fengxiang (Shaanxi), Taohuawu (Suzhou), and Mianzhu (Sichuan). Yangliuqing, is widely regarded as being the most prominent and influential contributor to the New Year Picture industry.

== History ==
Although there are few reliable records on which to base the early history of New Year pictures, Wang Shucun argues that they were popularized during the Ming dynasty. This development can be attributed to Ming government policy, the spread of popular novels, the development of woodblock printing techniques. and the development of large-scale production and marketing through New Year picture workshops (Chinese: 畫坊; pinyin: huàfāng).

Given the seasonal nature and ephemeral quality of New Year pictures, very few authentic examples can be dated to before the 19th century. Nonetheless, it is believed that the industry flourished from the late-Ming dynasty and throughout the Qing. In Weifang a workshop built in the Ming dynasty has been connected with the local production of New Year pictures. It contains a production room, a display room (Chinese: 望房; pinyin: wàngfáng), an accountant's office, guest rooms, and rooms for the workshop's owner. The organization of the workshop indicates the New Year picture artisans' business model, whereby the artisans both produce and market their wares.

The introduction of mechanized printing and changing aesthetic preferences in the early 20th century posed a serious challenge to New Year picture printers, and production declined until by the 1930s only a few workshops could be found in the formerly prosperous printing centers like Yangliuqing and Yangjiabu. During the Second Sino-Japanese War the Chinese Communist Party realized the propaganda potential of "peasant art" and began to promote "New New Year pictures".

In November 1949, the Ministry of Culture of the People's Republic of China issued a directive criticizing traditional nianhua for expressing feudal values. The Ministry called for the production of nianhua with revolutionary themes like the "great victory of the people's war of liberation" or "the life and struggles of ordinary labouring people."

The traditional industry was nearly extinguished by the 1960s. Following the Cultural Revolution efforts were made to recover New Year pictures as a heritage industry, and workshops can now be found in most of the larger production centers.

== Production method ==
In the past, New Year pictures were printed using patterns on wooden boards. The craftsmen first pasted the desired pattern onto a piece of wood. Then, the blank parts will be carved away, and the parts with the patterns will be retained. Then the obtained wooden boards will be pasted onto the new wooden boards. However, only the patterns with the same color will be retained, while the patterns with different colors and the blank areas will be removed. This process will be repeated until there is a corresponding wooden board for each color pattern. After that, the woodblock painters could use these wooden blocks to print the New Year pictures in large quantities.

== The Four Great New Year picture centers ==
The four major types of Chinese New Year pictures originated from the folk woodblock paintings in Zhujian Town, Kaifeng, Henan Province, Taohuawu, Suzhou, Jiangsu Province, Yangliuqing in Tianjin, and Yangjiaobei in Weifang, Shandong Province. The earliest schools originated in the Tang Dynasty. The Taohuawu area in Suzhou, Jiangsu Province, incorporated some European techniques in the Song Dynasty.

== Themes ==
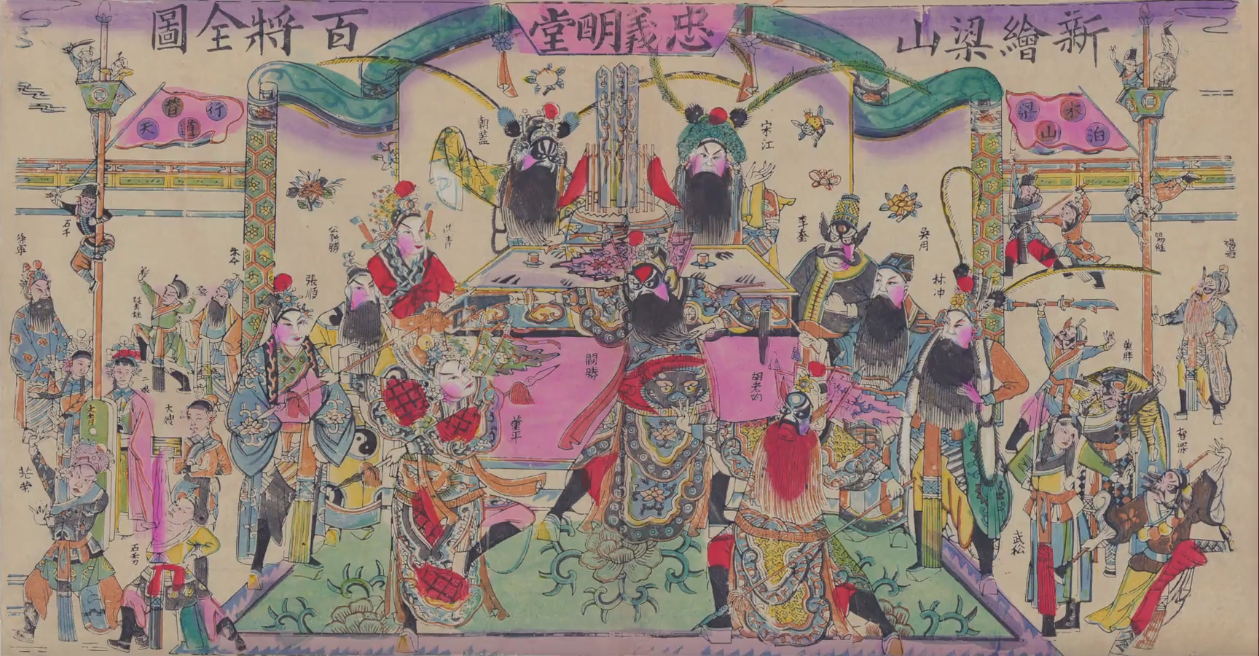
Depiction of the 108 Heroes from Water Margin, late Qing dynasty, National Library of China

The content of New Year pictures is diverse, but several main themes can be identified:

1. Immortals and auspicious symbols: Commonly depicted immortals include Door Gods, Kitchen God, and God of Wealth. Auspicious symbols may include lions, tigers, deer, cranes, Phoenix and auspicious birds, lotus, peony and other flowers, money tree, pot of wealth and other objects that express wishes for good fortune, wealth and happiness.
2. Secular life: Some folk artists created idealized depictions of rural and domestic life showing productive agriculture, family life, festive customs, humorous anecdotes, etc.
3. Baby and beauty: Images of babies (typically male), alone or in the company of young mothers, are very common motifs, as are images of beauties, alone or in the company of babies.
4. Narratives: Narratives adapted from historical events, folk stories, myths, legends, novels, and dramas.
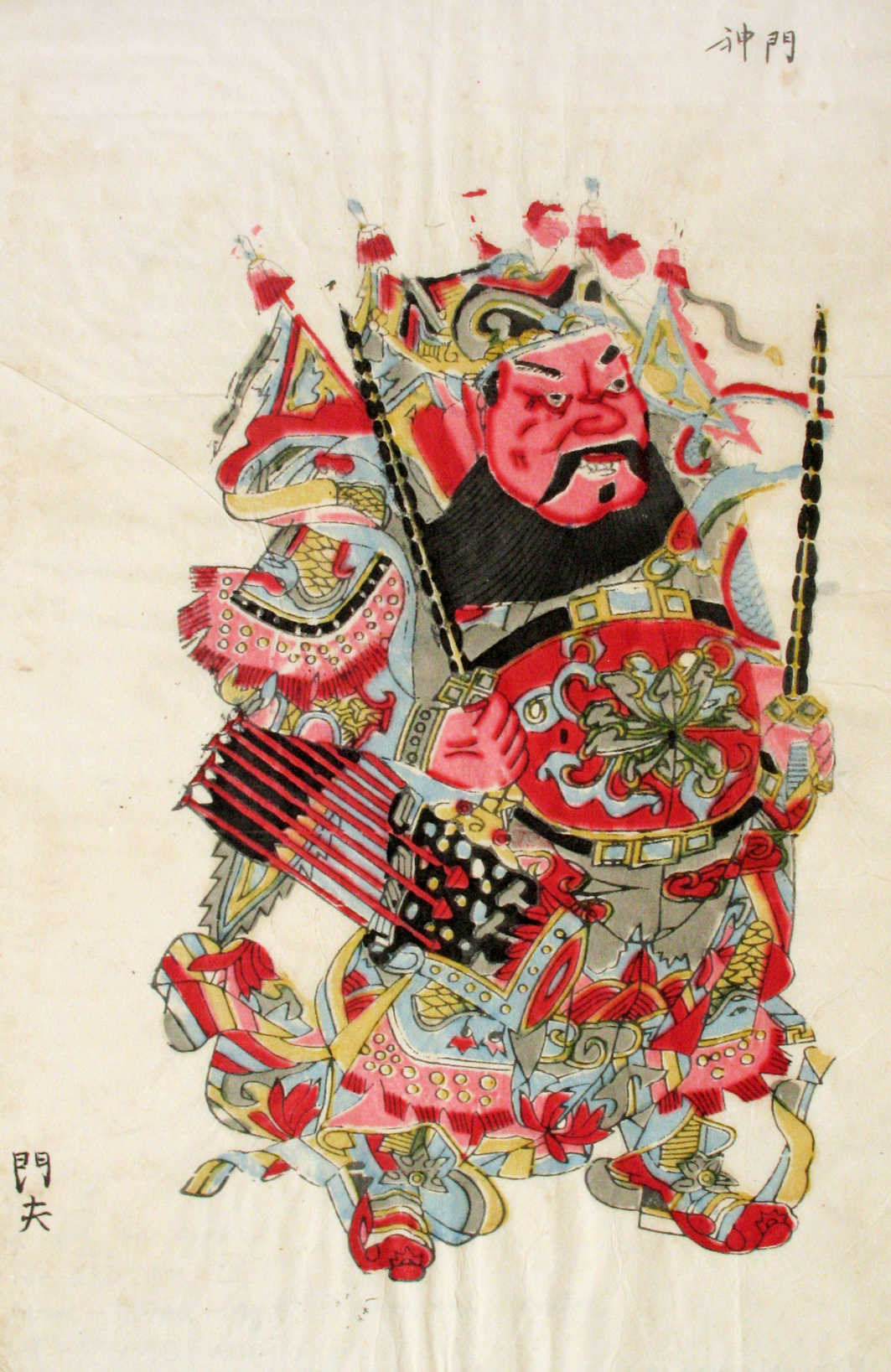
New Year picture. Unknown. 1900.

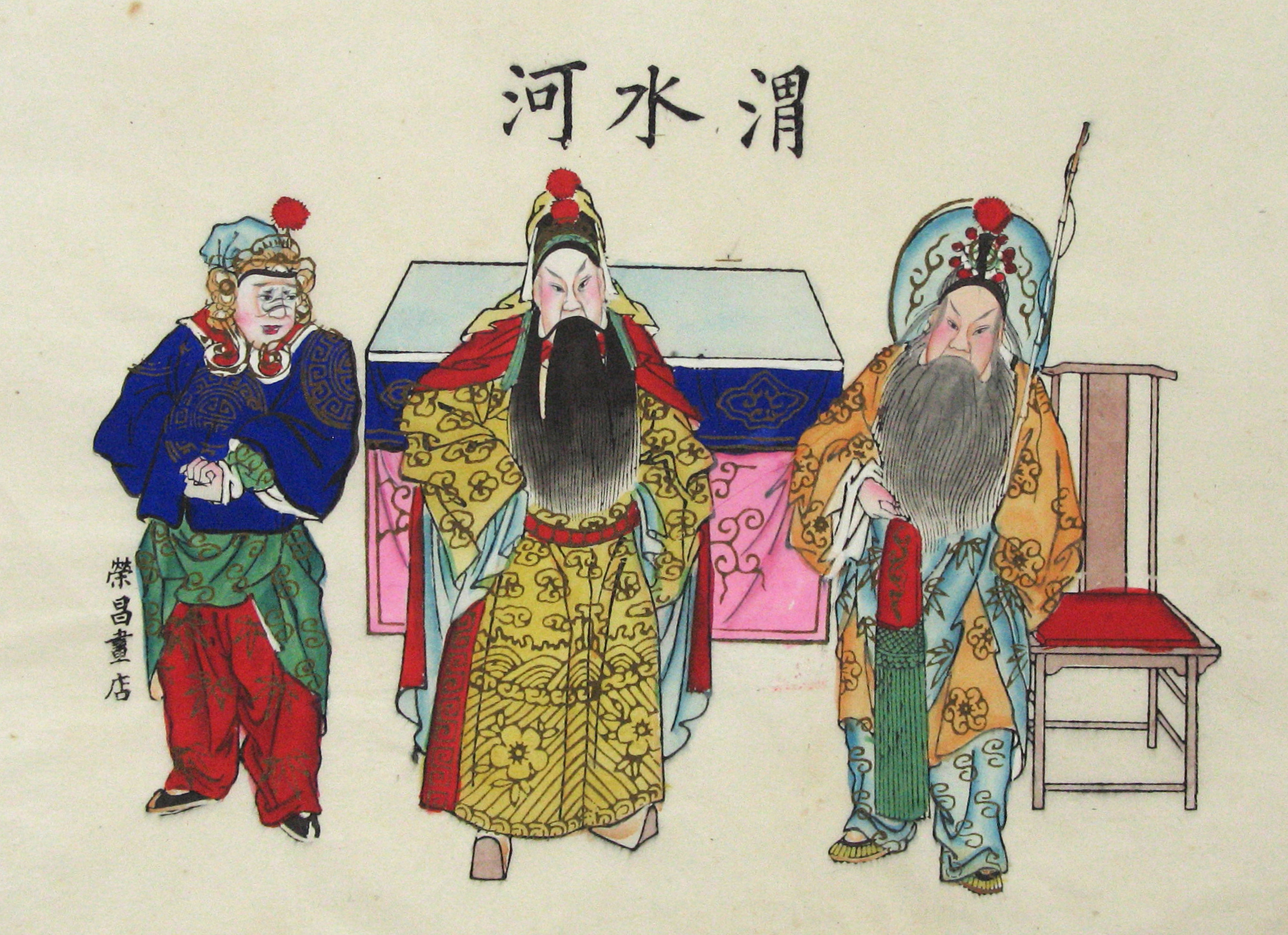
New Year picture. Three Deities colored woodblock print. 1900s.

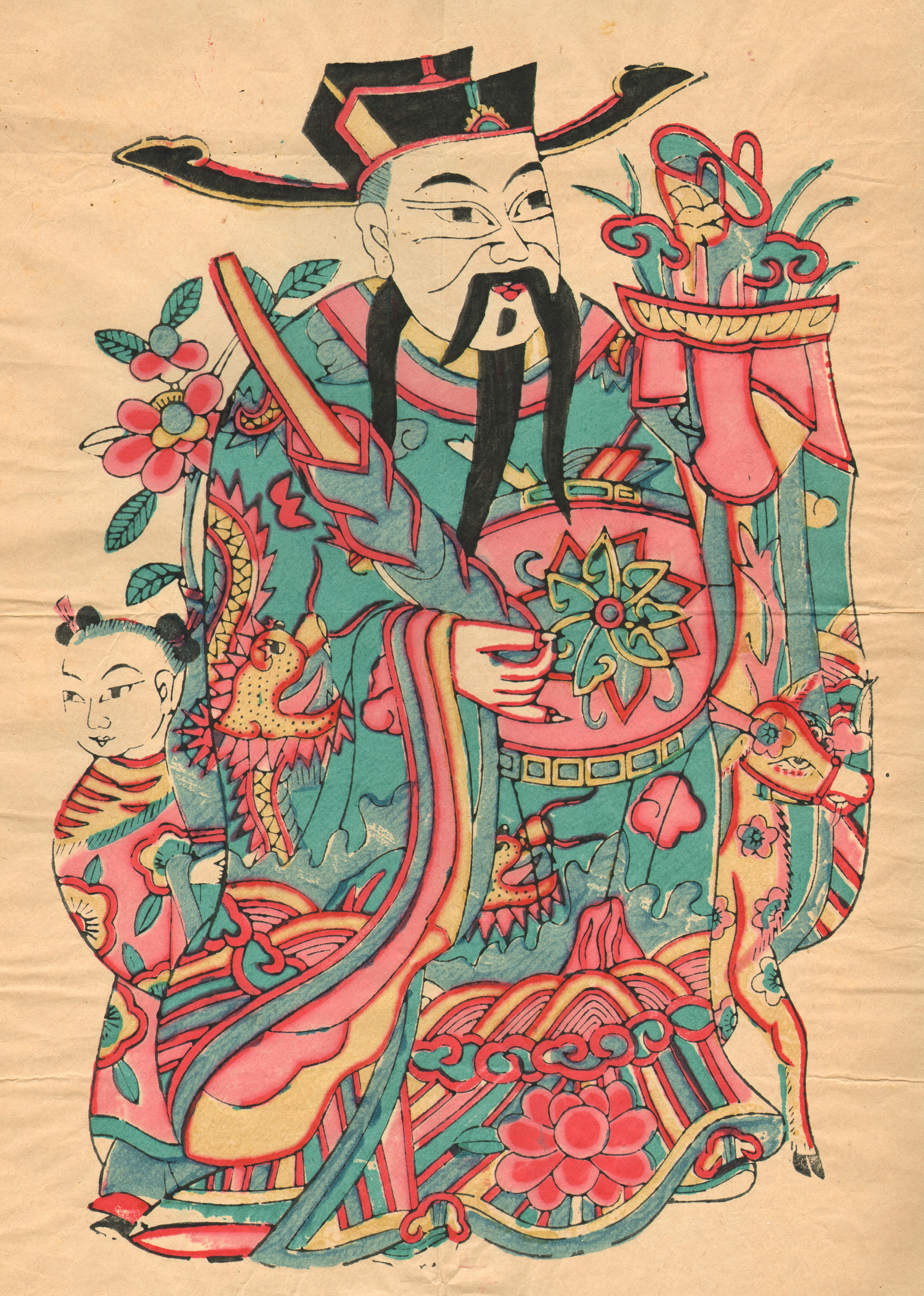
New Year picture. The Spirit of the Doors woodblock print. 1900s.

== See also ==
- Surimono
