= Lianhuanhua listed by year =

This is a list of Lianhuanhua produced in China sorted by year then alphabetical order.

== Preliminary List ==
The preliminary list is for books that were created before the term Lianhuanhua became the standard. Materials on this list are subject to debate.

| English name | Alternate or Pinyin English Name | Year | Chinese name | Author |
|---|---|---|---|---|
| Story of the Three Kingdoms | | 1899 | | Zhu Zhixuan |
| Exchange the Prince for a Leopard Cat | Limao Huan Taizi | 1918 | | |

== 1920s ==
| English name | Alternate English Name | Year | Chinese name | Author |
|---|---|---|---|---|
| The Eastward Conquer of Xue Ren-gui | Xue Rengui Going on an Eastern Expedition | 1920 | 薛仁貴東征 | Lui Bo-laing (劉伯良) |
| Wu Zong Uproars Hous' Mansion: Superheroes Linhuantau Pictorial | Wu Zong Wrecks Hous' Mansion: Superheroes Lianhuantau Pictorial | 1920 | 伍宗大鬧候府: :蓋世英雄連環畫圖 | Unknown |
| Illustrated History of Three Kingdoms | Lianhuan Tuhua Sanguo Zhi | 1927 | | Chen Danxu |

== 1930s ==
| English name | Alternate English Name | Year | Chinese name | Author |
|---|---|---|---|---|
| All Quiet on the Western Front Pictorial | | 1930 | 西線無戰事連環畫圖 | Unknown |
| Earthly Treasures | Dibaotu | 1933 | | Zhu Runzhai |
| Heavenly Treasures | Tianbaotu | 19xx | | Zhu Runzhai |
| Historical Romance of Three Kingdom | Sanguo Yanyi | 19xx | | Zhu Runzhai |

== 1940s ==
| English name | Alternate English Name | Year | Chinese name | Author |
|---|---|---|---|---|
| Assorted Titles | | 1940 | | Various |
| Nan-yang Gate | | 1947 | 南陽關 | Unknown |
| Wong Tin-ba Uproars Ju-lin Jai | | 1949 | 黃天霸大鬧珠簾寨 | Ng Fa-pang (吳化鵬) |
| Arrest of the Orchid (Cases of Magistrate Shi) | | 1949 | | Shen Manyun |

== 1950s ==
| English name | Alternate English Name | Year | Chinese name | Author |
|---|---|---|---|---|
| Erhei Gets Married | Xiao erhei jiehun | 1950 | | Mi Gu |
| Railroad Guerillas | Tiedao youjidui | 1954-1962 | | Ding Bingzeng |
| Story of the Three Kingdoms | | 1958 | | Yang Qinghua |

== 1960s ==
| English name | Alternate English Name | Year | Chinese name | Author |
|---|---|---|---|---|
| Monkey Beats the White-boned Demon | San da bai gu jing | 1962 | | Zhao Hongben, Qian Xiaodai |
| Great Change in a Mountain Village | Shanxiang jubian | 1962 | | He Youzhi |
| Li Shuangshuang | | 1962 | | He Youzhi |
| White Haired Girl | | 1963 | | Hua Sanchuan |

== 1970s ==
| English name | Alternate English Name | Year | Chinese name | Author |
|---|---|---|---|---|
| Qing Troops Enter the Pass | Qingbing rusai | 1978 | | Shi Dawei |
| Fifteen Strings of Cash | Shiwu guan | 1979 | | He Youzhi |

== 1980s ==
| English name | Alternate English Name | Year | Chinese name | Author |
|---|---|---|---|---|
| Hai Rui Leaves Office | Hai Rui ba guan | 1980 | | Huang Quanchang |
| Lianhuan Daily | | 1981 | | Various |
| The Phoenix Hairpin | Chatou Feng | 1983 | | Lu Fusheng |
| Legend of Zhou Tong | Zhou Tong Zhuan Qi | 1985 | 周侗传奇 | Xu Youwu |
| Midnight | | 1985 | | Ye Xiong |
