= Banhua =

Chinese term for printed art objects with wooden blocks

Banhua (Chinese: 版画) is the Chinese umbrella term for any printed art objects, and especially for those made by woodblock printing, the term used for woodcuts from Asia.

== History ==
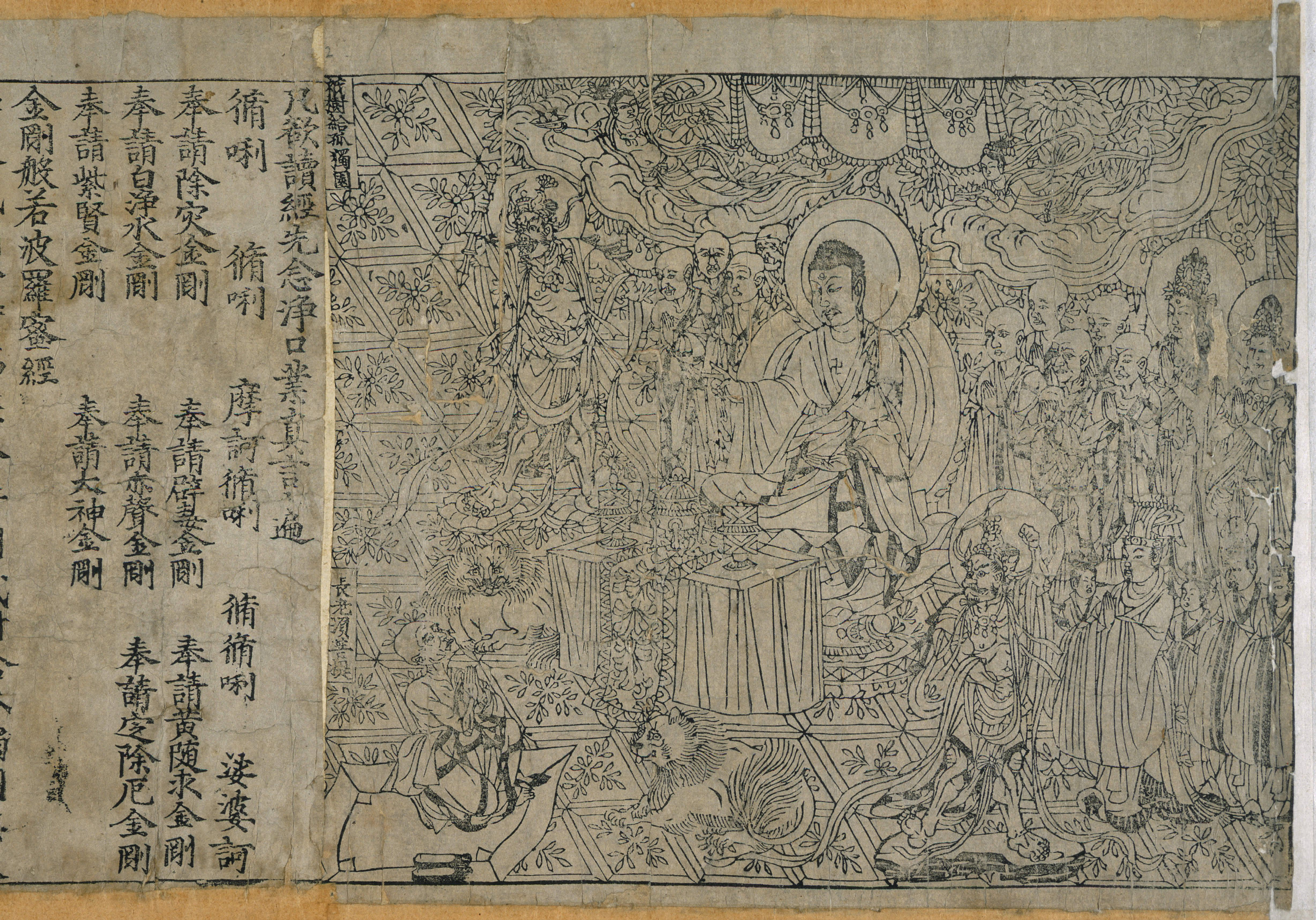
The intricate frontispiece of the Diamond Sutra from Tang dynasty China, 868 AD (British Museum)

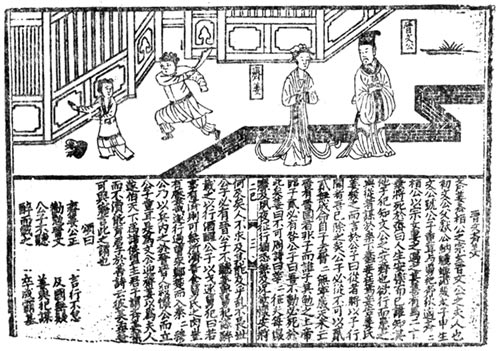
11th-century print of Lienü zhuan

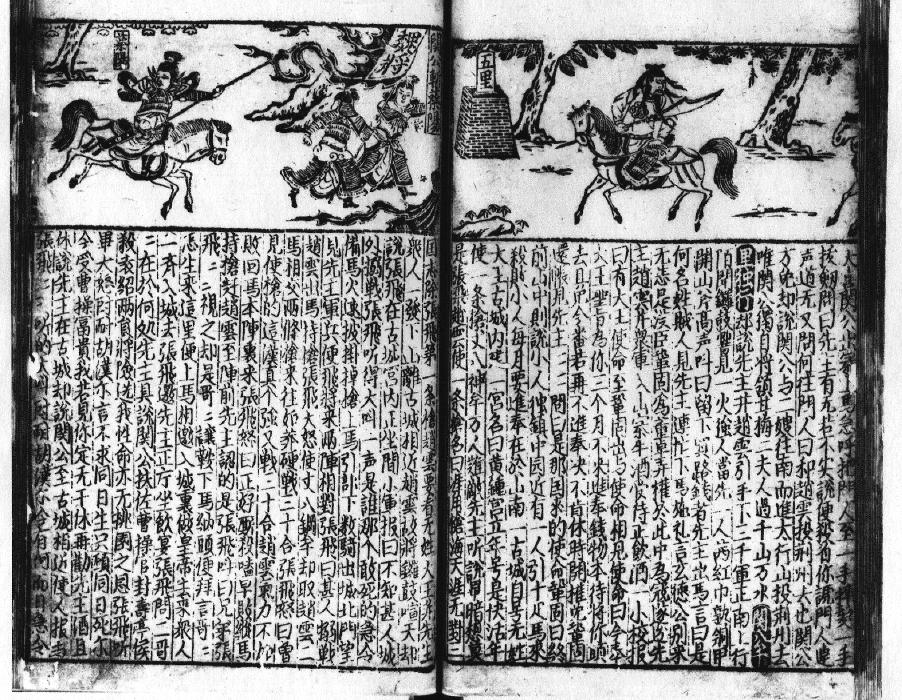
14th-century print of Sanguozhi Pinghua

The direct translation of 'Banhua' is 'printed picture', it is a general term for original prints or printmaking as an art form. 'Banhua' is composed of two characters: 'ban' (版) meaning 'block' and 'hua' (画) meaning 'picture'. Banhua's meaning is not limited to prints in Chinese style.

As printing first appeared in 3rd-century China, artists started to use woodblock printing or other methods to spread their works. Buddhist classics, novel illustrations, and the banknote were among the first public works to be printed in China.

From the 17th century, prints of New Year pictures became popular.

== See also ==
- Lianhuanhua
- Manhua
- Chinese animation
- Dongman
