= Jiang Weipu =

Chinese artist, publisher, and art historian (1926–2019)

Jiang Weipu (Chinese: 姜维朴; June 1926 – 29 September 2019) was a Chinese lianhuanhua artist, publisher, and art historian. Considered a founder of the lianhuanhua industry in the People's Republic of China, he has been called the "patron saint of lianhuanhua".

== Biography ==
Jiang was born in June 1926 in Huang County, Shandong, Republic of China. He joined the Communist revolution in October 1944, and worked as a journalist for East China Pictorial (华东画报) run by the East China Military Region. He later served as chief editor of the magazine.

In 1953, Jiang established the lianhuanhua division of People's Fine Arts Publishing House and served as its director. By 1962, the division had published 1,400 works of lianhuanhua, with more than 100 million copies printed.

When the Cultural Revolution broke out in 1966, Jiang was persecuted and imprisoned for two years. He returned to work in 1968 after his rehabilitation. In 1973, with the approval of Premier Zhou Enlai, Jiang re-established the magazine Lianhuanhua Pictorial (连环画报), which had been shut down since 1962. In the 1980s, it became one of China's ten best-selling magazines.

After the end of the Cultural Revolution, Jiang was appointed deputy editor-in-chief of People's Fine Arts Publishing House in 1977. He founded China Lianhuanhua Association in 1983 and served as its president. In 1985, he founded China Lianhuahua Publishing House and served as its editor-in-chief. He was elected a member of the 8th Chinese People's Political Consultative Conference. He retired in 1995.

Jiang died on 29 September 2019 in Beijing, aged 93.

== Publications ==
From the 1950s to the 1990s, Jiang oversaw the creation and publication of many lianhuanhua works, including Water Margin, Story of Yue Fei, The Generals of the Yang Family, and Romance of the Western Chamber. These highly popular works influenced generations of Chinese readers. From 1987 to 1993, Jiang published the five-volume lianhuanhua A Red Ribbon on Earth (地球的红飘带), based on an eponymous novel about the Long March of the Chinese Red Army. It won multiple national prizes and was hailed as a milestone in the history of lianhuanhua.

Jiang also wrote a number of works on the history of lianhuanhua, including Lu Xun on Lianhuanhua, A Treatise on the Art of Lianhuanhua, Appreciation of the Art of Lianhuanhua, and Sixty Years of Lianhuanhua in New China. In 2004, he was named a "Distinguished Art Historian" by the China Artists Association. The manhua artist Hua Junwu called Jiang the "patron saint of lianhuanhua".
