= Khatri (surname) =

Khatri (Hindi, Nepali: खत्री), (Punjabi: ਖੱਤਰੀ) is a surname.

== List of notable people ==
Notable people with the surname include:

- Abdul Gafur Khatri, Indian Rogan artist
- Abdul Kadar Khatri (1961–2019), Indian Bagh printmaker
- Atul Khatri, Indian stand-up comedian and YouTube personality
- Bhagawati Khatri (born 1972), Nepalese sport shooter at the 2000 Olympics
- Bhavna Khatri, Indian television actress
- Devaki Nandan Khatri (1861–1913), Indian Hindi novelist
- Gaurav Khatri, Indian cricketer
- Gul Muhammad Khatri (1919–1979), Pakistani artist
- Gulshan Rai Khatri (1944–2020), Indian doctor and public health specialist
- Hamed Al-Khatri, Omani sport shooter at the 2016 Olympics
- Hira Singh Khatri, Nepalese filmmaker
- Indra Bahadur Khatri, Nepalese politician
- Jayant Khatri (1909–1968), Gujarati short story author
- Kamal Khatri, Nepalese singer
- Khalaf Al-Khatri, Omani sport shooter at the 1992 and 1996 Olympics
- Krishna Khatri, Nepali woman's footballer
- Madhur Khatri, Indian cricketer
- Man Prasad Khatri (born 1963), Nepalese politician
- Mausam Khatri, Indian freestyle wrestler
- Mohammed Rafik Khatri, Indian Bagh printmaker
- Mohammed Yusuf Khatri, Indian inventor of Bagh printing
- Mukesh Khatri, Indian Greco-Roman wrestler at the 2004 Olympics
- Nayan Bahadur Khatri (died 2019), Chief Justice of Nepal
- Neeldaman Khatri, Indian politician, leader of Bharatiya Janata Party
- Nirmal Khatri, Indian politician and Member of Parliament
- Padma Bahadur Khatri (1915–1985), Nepalese army officer, diplomat and Foreign Minister
- Phupu Lhamu Khatri (born 1996), Nepalese Olympic judoka
- Poonam Khatri, Indian Wushu player, martial artist and athlete
- Ravinder Khatri, Indian Greco-Roman wrestler
- Sadia Khatri, Pakistani writer, photographer and feminist
- Sardar Gulab Singh Khatri, 18th-century Indian Sikh, founder of the Dallewalia Misl state
- Shabina Khatri, American journalist in Qatar, co-founder of Doha News
- Sulakshana Khatri, Indian film and television actress
- Uma Devi Khatri (1923–2003), known professionally as Tun Tun, Indian playback singer and actress-comedienne

Fictional characters:

- Fenisha Khatri, from the British television series Casualty
