= Ismail Sulemanji Khatri =

Indian craftsman

- इसमाइल सुलेमानजी खत्री
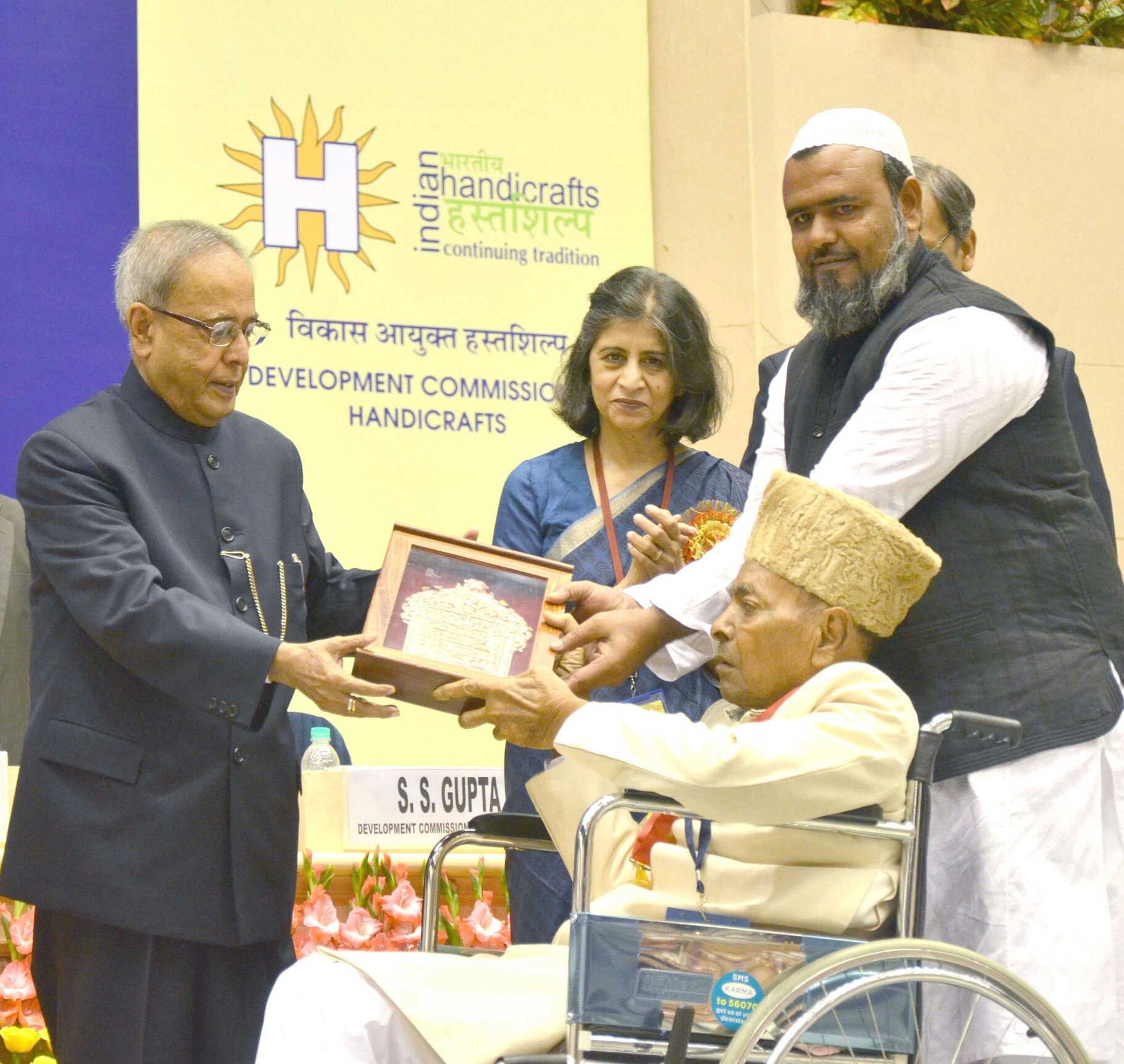
- Khatri (right) receiving Shilp Guru Award from President of India Shri Pranab Mukherjee at Vigyan Bhavan, New Delhi 2012
- Born: Mohammed Ismail; 12 August 1937; Manawar, Madhya Pradesh, India
- Died: 28 April 2014 (aged 76); Bagh
- Resting place: Bagh, Madhya Pradesh, India
- Known for: Bagh Print
- Spouse: Jetun Bee
- Children: Abdul Kadar Khatri; Mohammed Yusuf Khatri; Mohammed Rafik Khatri; Mohammed Dawood Khatri; Umar Faruk Khatri
- Relatives: Mohammed Bilal Khatri (Grandson); Mohammed Arif Khatri (Grandson); Kasim Khatri (Grandson); Abdul Karim Khatri(Grandson)
- Awards: Shilp Guru 2010; National Award 1984

Ismail Sulemanji Khatri (12 August 1937 – 28 April 2014) was an Indian craftsman, especially known for his invention of the Bagh print, a part of the centuries-old hand block printing practice.

He started block printing having moved to Bagh in the 1950s. As well as using traditional blocks, some 200–300 years old, he had new blocks made with designs inspired by the jali patterns found locally and at the Taj Mahal. He improved upon the red and black dyes previously used, and developed new vegetable-based dyes. Success came particularly when he started printing on bed sheets, saris and fabrics.

== Awards ==
- Lifetime achievement awards for Handicrafts 2013
- Received the 2010 Shilp Guru Award, the highest award of the Indian Craftsmanship.
- National Award from former President of India Shri Gyani Zail Singh at the Vigyan Bhavan New Delhi in 1984.
- State Award government of Madhya Pradesh 1978
- State Santavna Award government of Madhya Pradesh 1976
