= Mohammed Dawood Khatri =

- मोहम्मद दाऊद खत्री
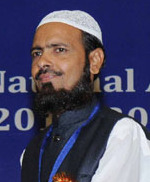
- Khatri in 2015
- Born: 1 January 1974 (age 52); Bagh, Madhya Pradesh, India
- Known for: Bagh Print
- Spouse: Aasma Bee
- Children: Moinuddin Khatri; Abdulmatin Khatri; Mohammed Sohel Khatri
- Parent(s): Ismail Sulemanji Khatri; Jetun Bee
- Awards: National Award 2012; National Merit Award 2007

Mohammed Dawood Khatri (born 1 January 1974) is a Master craftsmanfrom Bagh, Madhya Pradesh, India. He is Bagh Print Craftsman.

== Awards ==
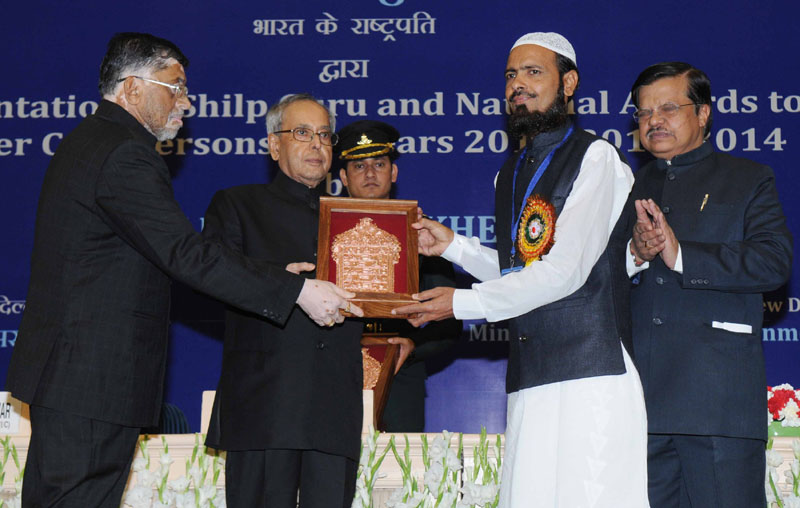
Mohammed Dawood Khatri

National Award in 2012
State Award in 2011
National Merit Award 2007
