= Crafts of India =

Overview of Indian crafts

Crafts of India include traditional styles such as Bidriware, Pembarthi Metal Craft, Dhokra, and Kamrupi.

Historically, Indian handicrafts, such as Kashmiri woollen carpets, Zari embroidered fabrics, terracotta and ceramic products and silk fabrics were exported to far off countries of Europe, Africa, West Asia and Far East via the Silk Route.

== Crafts of Madhya Pradesh ==
In block printing, Bagh, Nandna, and Batik prints from Bherugarh have intricate patterns. Madhya Pradesh's significant tribal population has also given rise to crafts deeply rooted in tribal culture, such as Dhokra, Gond paintings, Bhil paintings, and bamboo crafts.From small-scale artisans to large-scale production units, these crafts not only reflect the state’s artistic heritage but also support and sustain local communities.

Working of traditional Woodblock Printing Craft of Bagh, Madhya Pradesh, India

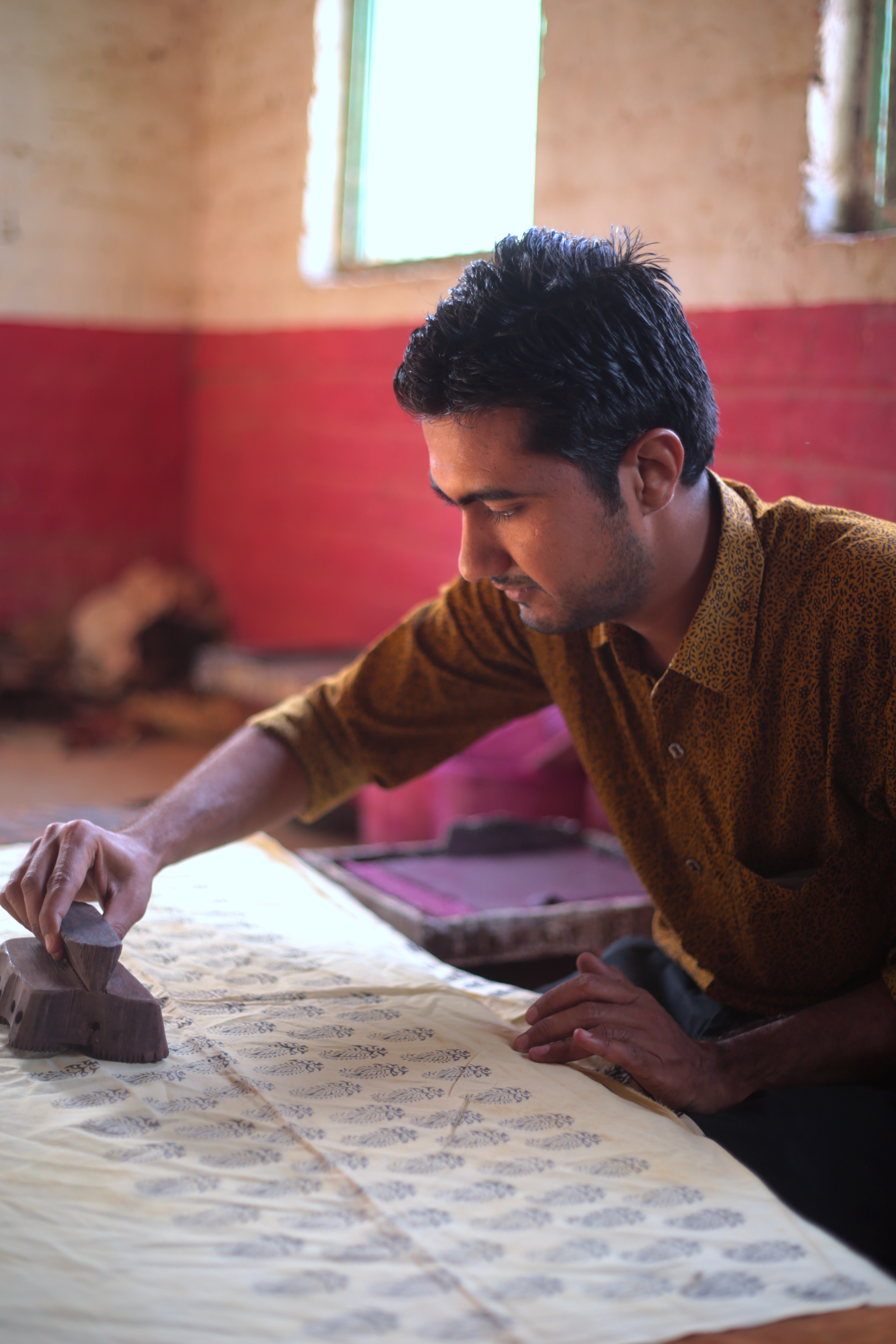
Bagh print traditional hand block print craft in Bagh

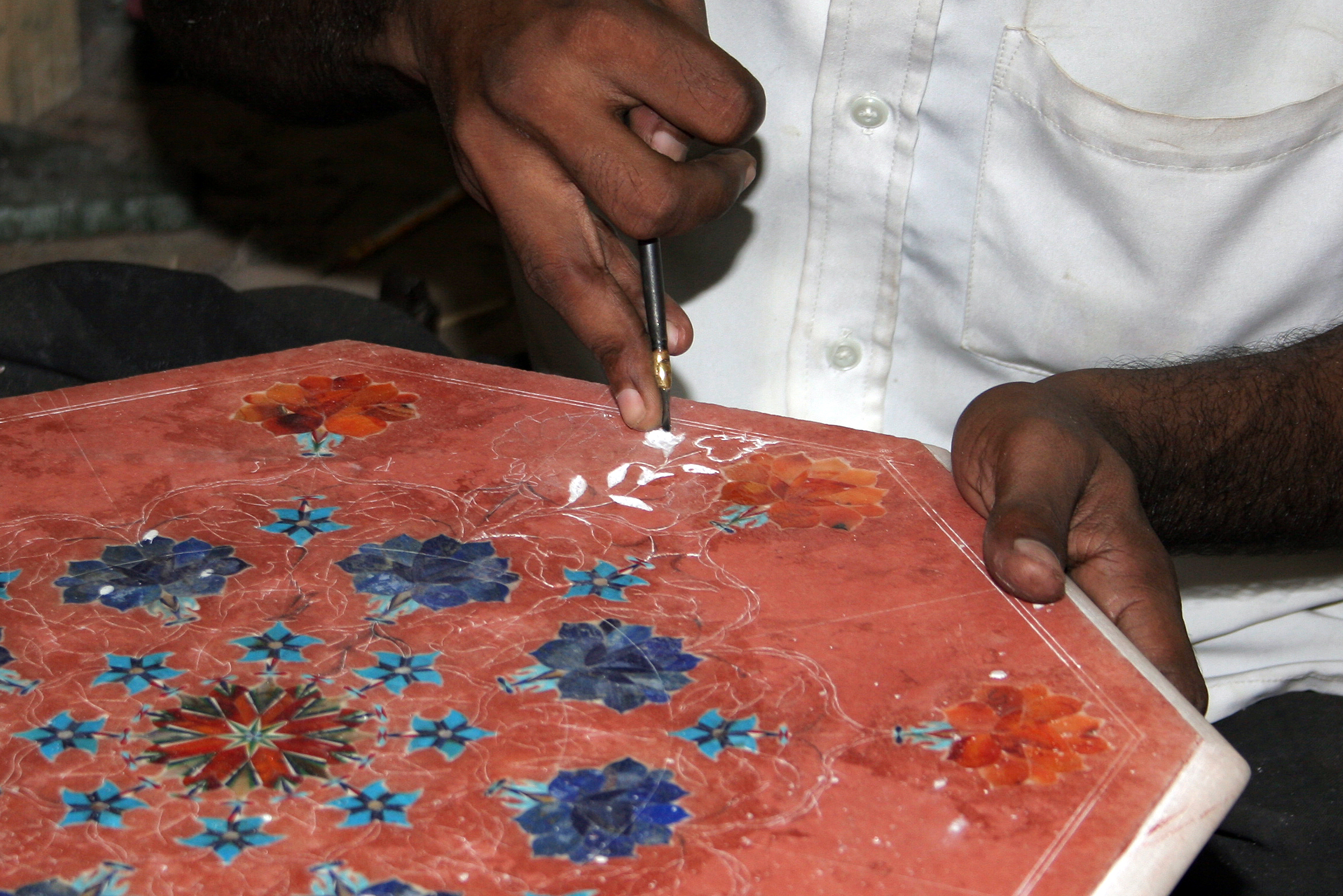
Artisan producing marble stone inlays, Agra

== Crafts of Bihar ==
Bihar is known for its Madhubani/Mithila Painting which literally meaning the ‘Forest of honey’. They are one of the earliest forms of Indian paintings. Bhagalpur painting is also known as Manjusha Art.

== Crafts of Rajasthan ==
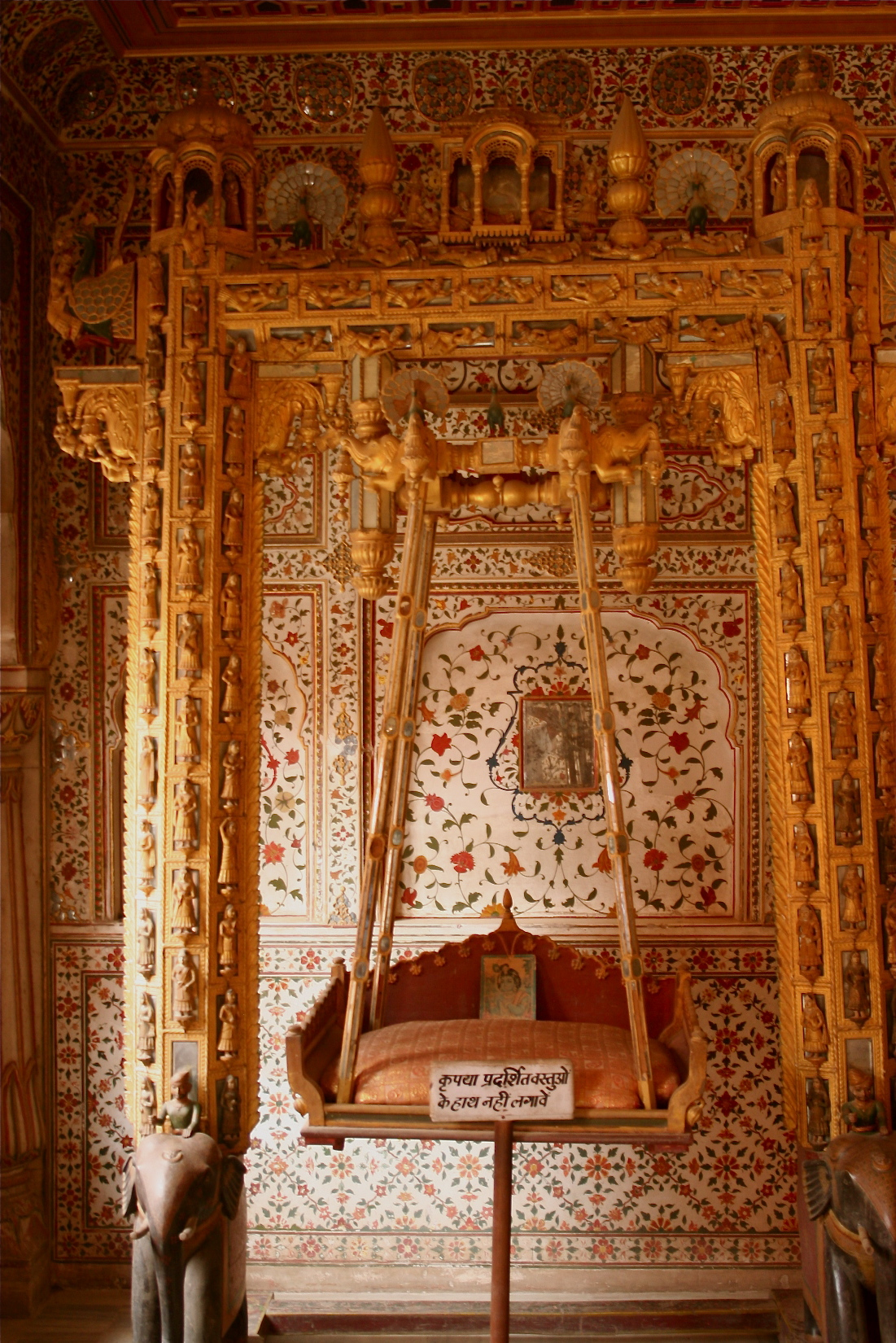
Handcrafted swing, (Jhoola) inside the Phool Mahal, Junagarh Fort, Bikaner

Rajasthan's crafts include fabric colouration and embellishment, decorative painting and puppetry. In the process of fabric colouration, woven fabrics are treated by methods such as tie-dyeing, resist dyeing and direct application. The dupatta worn by women shows the popularity of dyeing.

In 2008, traditional Jodhpur garments inspired designer Raghavendra Rathore's collection, Rathore Jodhpur. Fabric dyeing belongs to the Chippa caste of Rajasthan. Fabrics are embellished with mirror embroidery, symbolic to Rajasthan and wooden beading once dyed. The trend of mirror embroidery is also visible on dupattas in Punjab, known as the phulkari. Decorative patterns adorn all surfaces in Rajasthan. Interiors of homes are painted with floral motifs; similar bindi (dotted) designs are seen on garments. The clipped camel is unique to Rajasthan. In this, patterns are imprinted on the hide of the camel, during the Pushkar and Nagaur festivals by the Rabari caste. Puppetry and theatre has remained a popular form of entertainment in Rajasthan. Recently, its popularity has reduced with increased interest in film and television amongst rural communities. The nat bhat caste produces these marionette style puppets. Facial expressions are painted on a mango wood head and the body is covered in decorative, Rajasthani clothing. The strings loosely bind the arms and torso together to give flexibility for movement. These puppets usually perform legends and mythology conveying a moral message. Many Rajasthani crafts reach the international market.

== Crafts of Gujarat ==
Gujarat is known for its textile production methods. Bordering Rajasthan, the two states share similarities in culture and identity. The ancient Indus Valley civilization inhabited the entire region, including Rajasthan and Punjab during Medieval India. Within textile production, each caste is assigned to an occupation. These are weaving, dyeing and printing. For example, the Salvi caste is assigned to weaving. Garment producers bring these elements together to form Gujarati textiles. Paints are used to form patterns on fabric for dupattas, ghagras (long skirt) and turbans. Block printing is a widely used form of direct application, Gujarati Ajrakh block printing is one of the oldest printing technique. Excavation sites of Indus Valley civilization give evidence that Ajrakh was possibly one of the oldest printing methods of the Indian subcontinent.

In Bandhani fabric is tied at different sections before dyeing to create patterns. Large bangles made of ivory and plastic are symbols of a married woman. Conch shell and shellac bangles are the most common. Conch shell bangles are plain white with a light shade of a brighter colour, whereas shellac bangles are shaped as a shell, painted and decorated with glitter.

== Crafts of Assam ==
Crafts of Assam were exhibited in the National Handicrafts and Handborn Museum in 2010, showcased to U.S. First Lady, Michelle Obama. Silk is the most valued raw material of Assam, with the Antheraea assama worm producing the unique muga silk. It is mostly the duty of women to construct silk fabrics, using a domestic backstrap loom. Mahatma Gandhi noted "Assamese women are born weavers, they weave fairy-tales in their cloth". Domestic weaving is an important craft for Assamese women, with their marriage and future is seen as reliant upon this skill. At some stage, an unmarried girl would present a hand made bihuan to her beloved. Weaving holds a significant moral and cultural value in Assam. The silk and textile industry is also an economic resource to the state, with over 25,000 families associated with this craft. Cane and bamboo crafts are also produced in Assam. Ridang, suli, lezai and long cane are natural resources in the state. The finest cane is chopped and reduced to thin strips then woven into sheets. It is attached to the frame of a furniture piece, usually made out of bamboo sticks. They are also used as mats, providing comfort in summer. The trend of this sitalpati mat is also seen in Punjab in which a woven mat attached to a frame becomes a charpai.

== Crafts of South India ==
The diversity of religious beliefs has had a great impact on the crafts of Southern India. The region has seen the rule of various empires such as the Mughal, Portuguese, Dutch, French and British. Each has left their mark of style on traditional crafts. Dravidian style, stone carved temples reflect the influence of Hinduism whilst Roman Catholic churches echo the impact of the British rule. Temple carvings are symbolic of the craft skills in the Tamil Nadu region. The Meenakshi temple of Madurai typifies the skills and devotion put into this craftwork.

Madurai garland making craft can be defined as a band or chain of flowers, foliage, and leaves. In Tamil Nadu, and particularly in the temple town of Madurai, flower garlands are considered to play a significant role in expressing Tamil culture. Every garland is a myriad of colours which symbolize love, purity, and devotion.

Each section of the temple is a sacred shrine to a deity. North of Tamil Nadu is Karnataka, a region renowned for its wood and stone craftwork. The forests of this region provide extensive supplies of raw materials, mostly rosewood. For wood workers, crafting statues for large temples is a major source of income. Soapstone is also commonly used to carve statues.

== Crafts today ==
Contemporary designers such as Ritu Kumar and Ritu Virani use traditional crafts into their designs. The Indian Institute of Crafts and Design in Jaipur, Rajasthan, educates in crafts and design. Despite these efforts, rural craftspeople are in decline, according to the India Foundation for the Arts organisation. the rising costs of materials and supplies have placed many craft communities in financial struggle. Hand-made products are now considered to be a fashion statement and an item of luxury.
