= Bagh print =

Traditional Indian wood block printing

Bagh prints of Madhya Pradesh
- Geographical indication
- Type: Printed fabrics
- Area: Village Bagh
- Country: India
- Registered: Product registered in 2008 and logo registered in 2015
- Material: Cotton, silk, tussar

Bagh print is a traditional Indian handicraft originating in Bagh, Dhar district of Madhya Pradesh, India. The process is characterised by hand-printed wood block relief prints with naturally sourced pigments and dyes. Bagh print motifs are typically geometric, paisley, or floral compositions design, dyed with vegetable colours of red and black over a white background, and is a popular textile printing product. Its name is derived from the village Bagh located on the banks of the Bagh River.

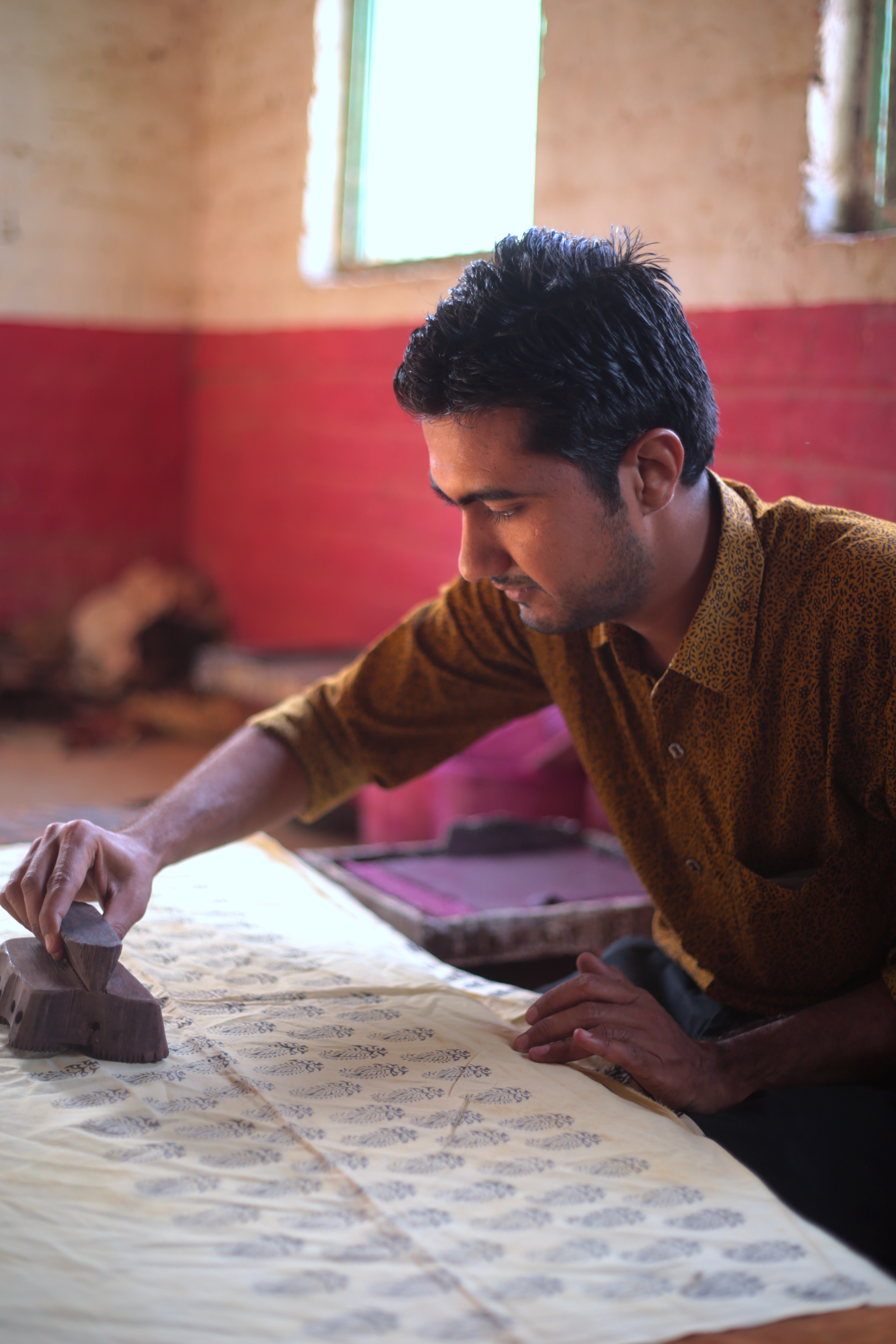
Bagh hand block print artist at work

== History ==
The origins of the Bagh print are uncertain, but it is believed that the practice is over 1,000 years old, with the techniques having been handed down through family practice from generation to generation. It is possible that the craft traveled with settlers from Jawad in the Madhya Pradesh state in India or from printers of Rajasthan state. Another possibility is that the Chhipas, or traditional cloth printers, of the Muslim Khatri community which currently practice the craft of Bagh print, traveled to the area around 400 years ago from Larkana in Sindh province, Pakistan, which is known for the Ajrak tradition of block printing.

The initial reasons for the migration is unclear, but the area's proximity to the Bagh river, which provided the water necessary for washing of fabric and processing of vegetable dyes, could be the primary reason for settling in Bagh. In addition, the chemical composition of the water from the Bagh river enhances the texture of the vegetable, natural, and black dyes, giving them a luminous quality that distinguishes Bagh prints from other prints in Madhya Pradesh and Rajasthan regions.

In the 1960s, many craftsmen abandoned the traditional process of Bagh prints in favour of using synthetic fabrics. However, a number of artisans, including Ismail Sulemanji Khatri, continued to practice and innovate within the traditional framework of the craft and brought Bagh prints to international prominence.

In 2011, a Bagh print design was adopted in a tableau theme of the Madhya Pradesh state at the Republic Day parade in New Delhi on 26 January 2011. Featured in the parade was a Shalbhanjika, the celestial apsara of the 11th century, draped in Bagh printed clothing.

== Process ==
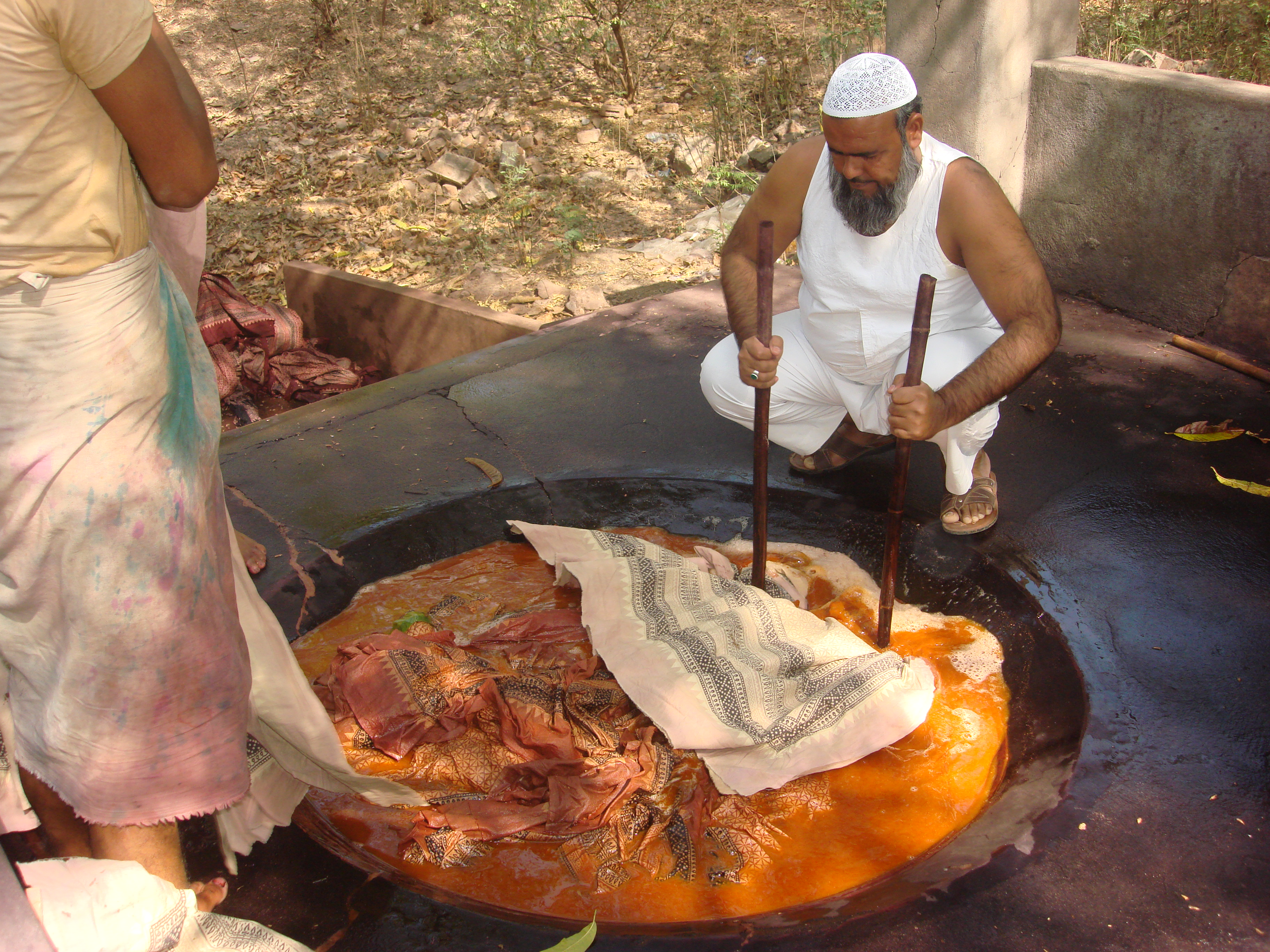
Artist at work on the Bhatti process.

The process of creating Bagh prints includes pre-printing (washing and pre-dying of the fabric), printing (application of the design), and post-printing (fixing the dyes and applying a fabric finish).

=== Pre-printing ===
Pre-printing starts with Khara Karna, the initial washing of the fabric for printing. Cotton is the commonly used fabric; however, other fabrics include the Maheshwari suit material, kosa silk, bamboo chicks, chiffon, crepe, georgette tissue, and mulberry silk. The Khara Karna washing consists of washing in running water for two hours and beating the fabric on river stones to remove any starch in the fabric to assist with the dyeing process.

Next, the fabric is soaked in a water solution of rock salt, mengni (goat dung), and castor oil, pressed, rinsed, and dried three times, which is known as Mengni Karna. Then, the cloth is pre-dyed with Harara to provide an off-white base color, which also adds a richness to the black and red dyes that will be applied later.

=== Printing ===
Bagh prints are made by hand applying natural and vegetable-based dyes using carved wood relief blocks. Red and black dyes are most common, but indigo, mustard, and khaki dyes are also used. New blocks for printing are hand carved from teak or sheesham wood, but some blocks have been in use for 200 – 300 years. Motifs for the prints are geometric or floral, sometimes inspired by the 1,500 year old paintings at Bagh Caves.

==== Dyes ====
Dyes for printing are derived from plant sources (plants, fruits, and flowers), and minerals. To make the dyes, pigments like ferrous sulfate and alum are boiled in water and mixed with tamarind seed powder to make a paste, which acts as black and red dyes respectively. Other colors like indigo, mustard, and khaki can be made using indigo leaves, dhavdi leaves, or pomegranate rinds.

==== Printing blocks ====
The blocks, known as bilals and bibas are made of intricate and deeply carved teak or sheesham (Dalbergia sissoo) wood and are frequently sourced from Pethapur, Gandhinagar, and Jaipur. The relief blocks can be reused and collected over generations, with some family libraries holding thousands of individual designs. Some blocks are up to 300 years old and have been in use for so long that they are known by particular names. New blocks are made approximately every six months to keep up with market demand, but care is taken to ensure that the new design is a variation of a traditionally accepted design. Common motifs include geometric shapes as well as natural forms like jasmine, mushroom, mango, or small dots on a field.

==== Printing process ====
In order to apply the correct amount of dye to the printing block, a wooden reservoir, called a palea, is filled with dye. A bamboo mesh (kartali) wrapped in wool is set up to float in the reservoir, soaking up the dye and transferring the color when the printing block is rested on top. The cloth to be printed is laid over a red sandstone table, called a farsi, which is padded with extra cloth or old clothes to ensure smooth printing. The printing blocks are applied by hand, with an expert craftsman producing five yards of fabric in two to three hours, depending on the complexity of the design. Once the design is fully printed, the cloth rests for 8 to 14 days to allow the dye to fully absorb into the fabric.

=== Post-printing ===
Once the fabric has rested, it is brought to the river and rigorously washed for 20 minutes and beaten against river stones to remove excess dye. This process, known as the Bichalna, requires both strength and care, as any smudges or stains that occur from improper washing are permanent. The fabric is then fixed and finished in the Bhatti process, where the fabric is boiled in a mixture of water, Alizarin, and Dhavda flowers. The fabric is constantly shifted and turned with long sticks as the temperature of solution is slowly increased, which aids in the proper development of the colors. The whole process takes from four to six hours. Finally, the fabric is bleached and washed three more times before the fabric is complete.

== Prominent master craftspersons ==
- Mohammed Yusuf Khatri
- Ismail Sulemanji Khatri
- Abdul Kadar Khatri (1961-2019)

== Quality control ==
The Development Commissioner for Handicrafts, Government of India's branch office in Madhya Pradesh exercises control on quality. The artisans themselves follow an internal quality control mechanism through various stages of its production through master artisans. The Textiles Committee of the Ministry of Textiles, Government of India, exercises quality control through the Development Commissioner of Handicrafts in cooperation with the stakeholders.

== New experiments ==
Initially, Mohammed Yusuf Khatri, Mohammed Bilal Khatri, Mohammed Kazeem Khatri, and their family made traditional dresses to meet the needs of various caste groups residing in the tribal region of Bagh. People of different castes and families had different dresses with specific identification tags of the tribal Bhil and Bhilala community. Some of the Kahtris developed designs to meet contemporary urban taste in the later part of 1980s; these designs covered sarees, shalwar kameez, covers for cushion and tables, block printed silk saree, tusser silk, silk stoll, scarf, and so forth. Some the family members created innovative wooden blocks and colours which were accepted in the national and international market due to their long life. These included craft such as block printing on bamboo chik or mats, leather, jute, and other materials besides cloth.

One such practice he pursued was the old technique of reusing the traditional blocks of 200 to 300 years old, which were patterns or designs of paintings in the 1,500 year old cave paintings in the region.

Some of the block designs covered Nariyal Zaal and Ghevar Zaal based on the Taj Mahal paintings, Saj, Dakmandwa, chameli or jasmine, maithir or mushroom, leheriya and jurvaria or small dots on the field. Other innovations introduced by the Khatri family are block designs of the jaali pattern from the Taj Mahal and forts in the region, standardizing the use of primary colours of alum-based red, and corroded filings of iron for black, and developing vegetable-based yellow and green dyes. His primary innovation was creating the Bagh print on different types of cloth by printing on them. His innovative design of a bed cover, consisted of a bed cover which had 1,200 different blocks and won him the National Award in 1984.

== Location ==
The Bagh village, where this handicraft is practiced, lies within the geographical coordinates of 22°22′00″N 74°40′00″E at an elevation of 240 metres (790 ft). The Bagh River, which flows near the village, is a major factor in the adoption of the art form. The Narmada River, about 30 kilometres (19 mi) from Bagh, being a perennial source, is an important source for this art work, particularly during the season when the Bagh River goes dry.

Bagh prints are listed as geographically tagged handicraft and are protected under the Geographical Indications of Goods (Registration & Protection) Act (GI Act) 1999 of the Government of India. They were registered by the Controller General of Patents Designs and Trademarks under the title "Bagh Prints of Madhya Pradesh" and recorded with (GI) tag under Application number 98 in 2008. Its logo, with the title Bagh Prints of Madhya Pradesh (logo) was approved under application number 505 dated 1 August 2015 under Class 24 Textiles and Textile goods not included under other classes.
