= Pembarthi Metal Craft =

Crafts in India

Pembarthi Metal Craft is a metal handicraft made in Pembarthi, Jangaon district, Telangana State, India. They are popular for their exquisite brassware, sheet metal art works. A few decades back there were about 150 families depend on the profession, now the artisans decreased to about 20 to 30 due to lack of marketing avenues, now crafts are being marketing globally through www.metalartisan.in website. Pembarthi's crafts includes idols, figurines, and other decorative pieces. For such metal craftwork the village Pembarthi has been chosen by the Ministry of Tourism as the best tourism villages in Telangana for the year 2023.
