= Abdul Kadar Khatri =

Indian hand block printing master craftsman (1961–2019)

- अब्दुल कादर खत्री
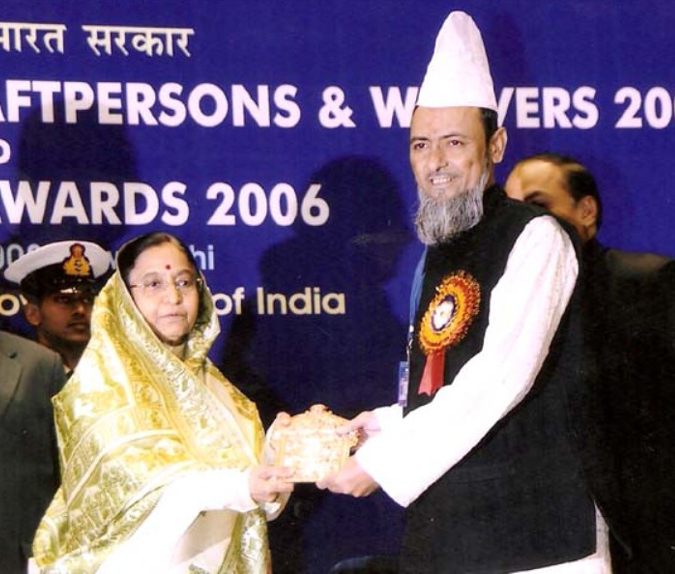
- Abdul Kadar Khatri (right) receiving National Award by Former President of India Pratibha Patil at Vigyan Bhawan, New Delhi, India.
- Born: 1 April 1961; Bagh, Madhya Pradesh, India
- Died: May 12, 2019 (aged 58); Bagh, Madhya Pradesh
- Resting place: Bagh, Madhya Pradesh
- Known for: Bagh print
- Spouse: Rashida Bee (Twice State Award Winner)
- Parent: Ismail Sulemanji Khatri
- Awards: Seal of Excellence for Handicrafts by UNESCO; National Handicrafts Award; State Award; Surajkund Kala Nidhi Award

Abdul Kadar Khatri (1961–2019) was an Indian master craftsman of traditional hand block printing known as Bagh Print. He was the son of Ismail Sulemanji Khatri, founder of Bagh print. He along with his father saved the tradition of Textile printing of Bagh from extinction and taken it to new heights. His artifacts have brought laurels to India and particular to Madhya Pradesh state from across the globe by showcasing his exceptional talent in Bagh Print in many countries. His family has been working in the trade of Traditional Bagh Hand Block print since the 7th century.

His work was appreciated by Kamaladevi Chattopadhyay, Martand Singh, Laila Tyabji, and Ṛta Kapur Chishti.

Abdul Kadar Khatri experimented incorporating modernity in the wood blocks and colours.

== Early life ==
Abdul Kadar was born on 1 April 1961 to a Muslim family in Bagh, Madhya Pradesh, India. He was son of Ismail Sulemanji Khatri, founder of Bagh Print. Kadar was the eldest of five brothers and one sister in his family. His ancestors, the Khatri community, who comprise the 'chhipas' or printers, were originally from Larkana in Sindh (now in Pakistan), they came here about 400 years ago, and had since migrated to Marwad in Rajasthan and then to Manawar and they finally settled in Bagh. With them they brought the block printing technique. Kadar along with his father improved upon the red and black dyes previously used and developed new vegetable based dyes. His primary innovation was creating the Bagh Print on different types of cloth by printing on them.

== Career ==
Abdul Kadar Khatri learned the craft of Bagh hand block printing from his father, Ismail Sulemanji Khatri, and went on to establish himself as one of its most innovative practitioners. His career was marked by both preserving the centuries-old traditions of his community and experimenting with new directions for the craft. His work was exhibited internationally in countries including Germany, Oman, Australia, South Africa, Malaysia, and Thailand, helping to bring global recognition to the Bagh printing tradition. From his workshop in the Dhar district of Madhya Pradesh, Khatri also developed initiatives to promote Bagh printing on the world stage while supporting the livelihoods of local artisans.

== Techniques and innovations ==
Khatri was known for blending traditional Bagh printing methods with bold innovations that expanded the scope of the craft. He worked with natural dyes such as alizarin, alum, and rust of iron to maintain the characteristic red and black palette, while also creating new motifs inspired by geometric, floral, and contemporary patterns. He further extended the tradition by applying Bagh prints to unconventional materials such as bamboo chiks, leather, and jute, making him one of the first artisans to adapt the practice beyond textiles. By reinterpreting wooden block designs for modern uses, he ensured that Bagh printing remained relevant in both domestic and international markets.

== Recognitions/honours ==
- National Award by Former President of India Pratibha Patil from Ministry of Textiles, Government of India at Vigyan Bhawan, New Delhi, India in 2005.
- State Award by former Governor of Madhya Pradesh Kunwar Mahmud Ali Khan in 1991.
- International Award of Excellence for Handicrafts by UNESCO in 2018.
- Kala Nidhi Award by Haryana Tourism at Surajkund International Crafts Festival by Governor of Haryana Kaptan Singh Solanki and Governor of Chhattisgarh Balram Das Tandon in 2015.
- Certificate of Appreciation for Muscat Festival by Indian embassy in Muscat, Oman
- Certificate of Appreciation for International Sourcing Show Melbourne by Consulate General of India in Melbourne, Australia.
