= Rogan painting =

Art of cloth printing from India and Afghanistan

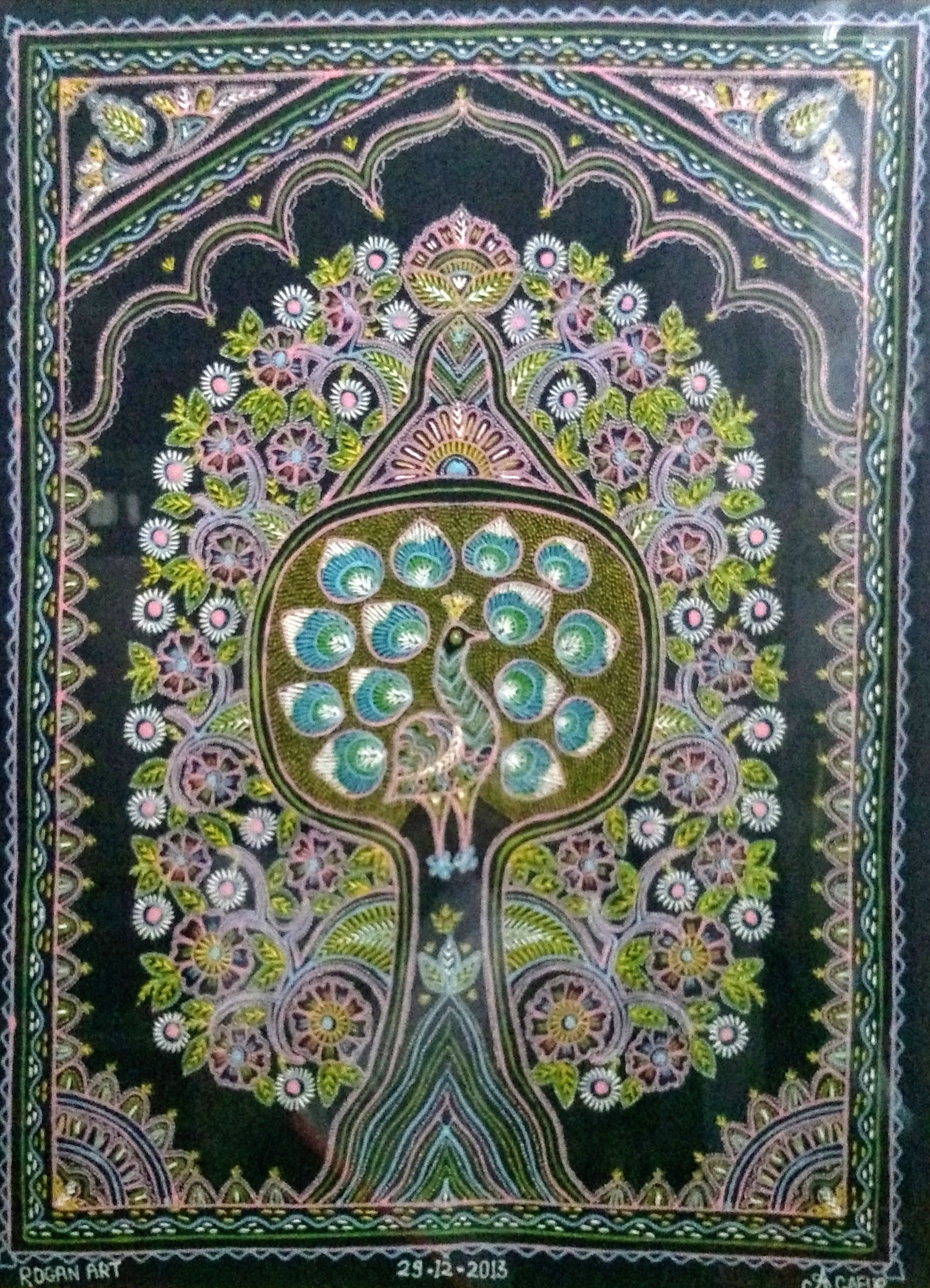
Rogan art Tree of Life motif, Created by Abdulgafur Khatri

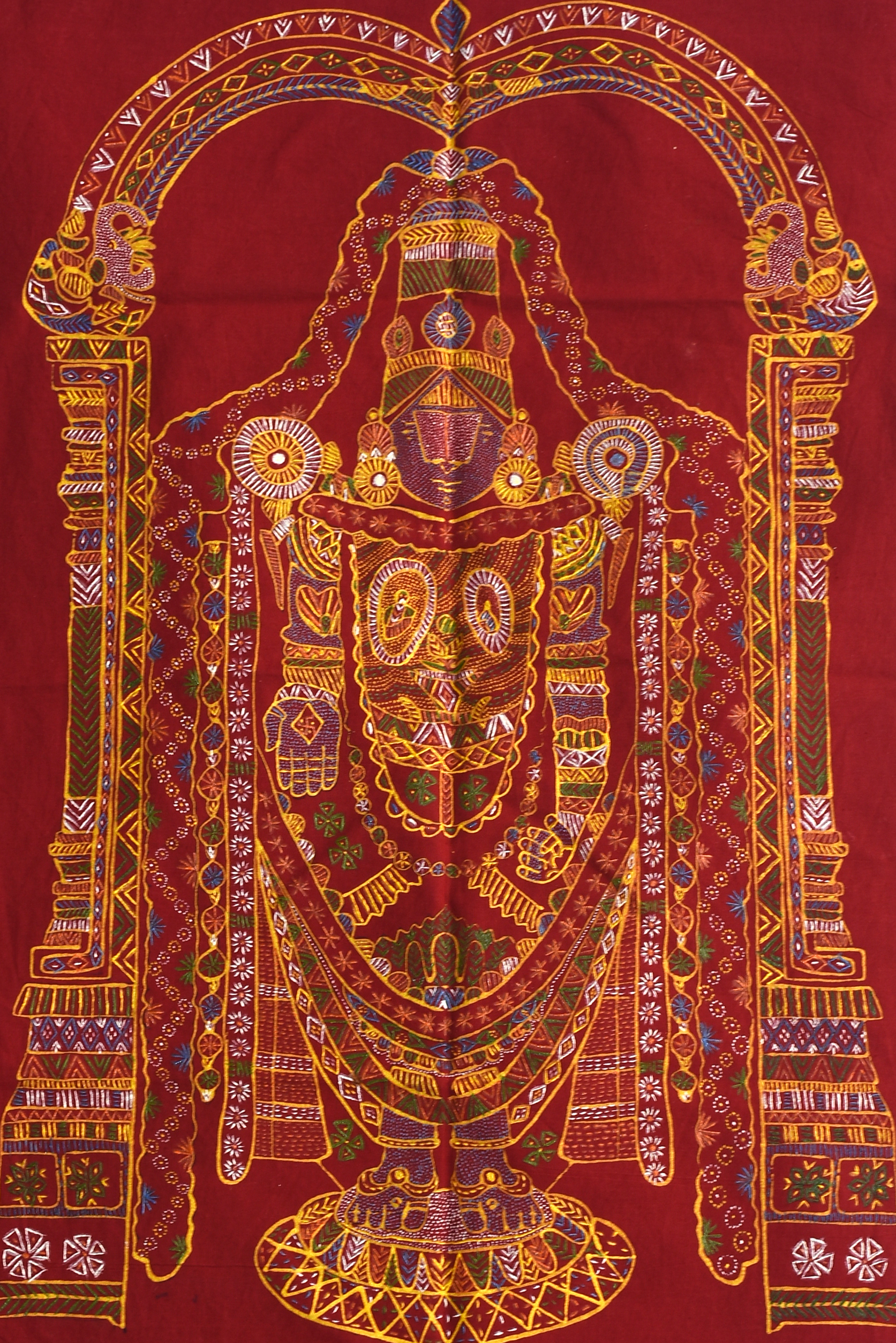
Shree Tirupati Balaji, Rogan painting by Ashish Kansara

Rogan painting is an art of cloth printing practiced in India and Afghanistan. In this craft, oil paint made from boiled oil and vegetable dyes is laid down on fabric using a tulika (stylus). The origins of rogan painting span from Patliputra (Bihar) to Bamiyan and Gujarat. According to UNESCO research conducted in 2008, Buddhist rogan paintings date back to the 5th or 6th century. Rogan painting is also known as the drying oil technique.

The style of painting has three main techniques: rogan art (done freehand), nirmika rogan art (involving block printing) and varnika rogan art (with additional embellishments and colors).

== History ==
Rogan painting artist from Madhapar, Kutch

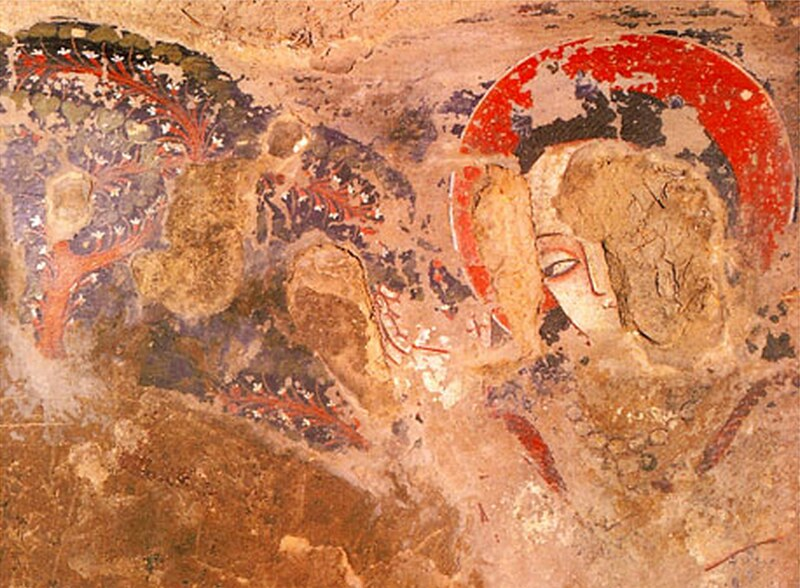
Oldest drying Oil Painting of Buddha (Bamiyan)

The process of applying this oil based paint to fabric began among the Hindu Khatris community in Gujarat. Although the name rogan (and some of the traditional designs) suggests an origin in Indian culture, there are some reliable historical records to prove this. The word comes from the Sanskrit word "रङ्गन्" (rangan), which means "to add color" or "to dye". The Rogan Art lehenga is a traditional garment worn for Indian weddings and festivals, renowned for its intricate craftsmanship.

Rogan painting was initially practiced in several locations in the Gujarat region like Ahmadabad, Deesa, Palanpur, Mahesana, Banaskantha Kutch and Patan. The painted fabric was mostly purchased by women of the Hindu lower castes who wanted to decorate clothing for their weddings. It was therefore a seasonal art, with most of the work taking place during the months when most weddings take place. During the rest of the year, the artisans would switch to other forms of work, such as agriculture.

With the rise of cheaper and machine-made textiles in the late 20th century, rogan-painted products became relatively more expensive, and many artists turned to other occupations. Rogan craft of the Kutch district has been awarded Geographical Indication status.

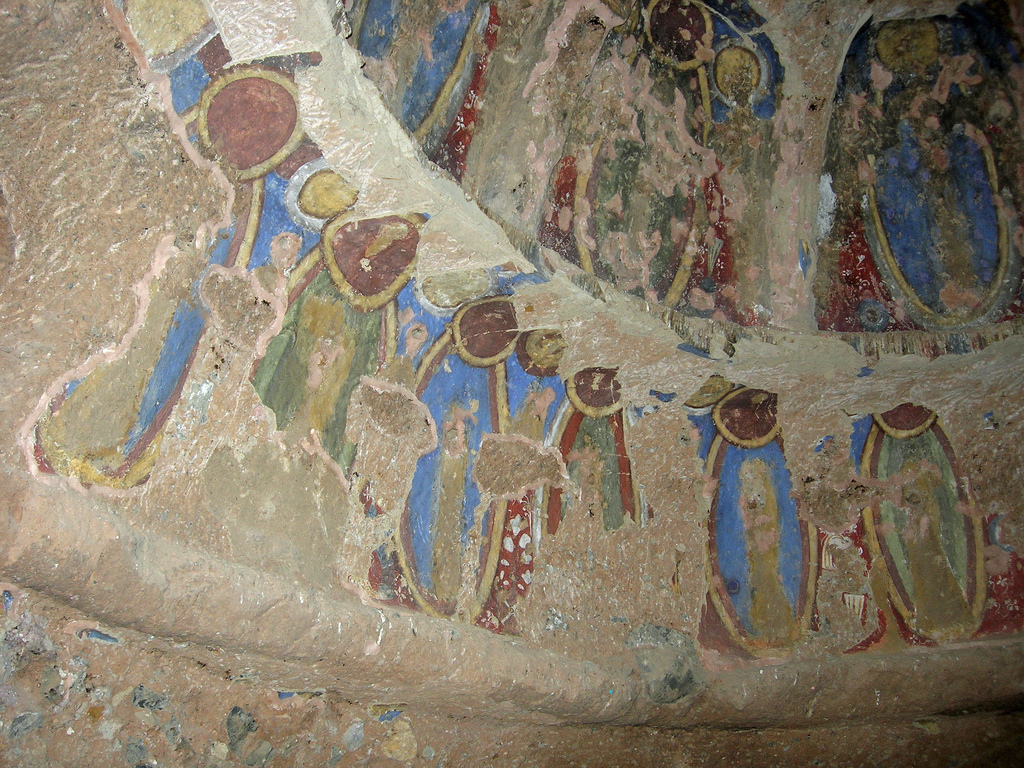
Buddha

== Process of rogan printing ==
Rogan paint is produced by boiling castor oil for about two days; alternatively, linseed oil, walnut oil, or poppy seed oil may also be used. Vegetable pigments and a binding agent are then added, and the resulting paint is thick and shiny. The cloth that is painted or printed on is usually a dark color, which makes the intense colors stand out. Traditional Rogan painting is made using only five colours, white, orange, yellow, blue, and green.

In rogan printing (nirmika rogan), the pattern is applied using Brass mold (Biba called in Gujarati) with patterns carved into them, whereas in rogan painting, elaborate designs are produced freehand, by trailing thread-like strands of paint off of a stylus. Frequently, half of a design is painted, then the cloth is folded in half, transferring a mirror image to the other half of the fabric. The designs include floral motifs, animals, and local folk art. Varnika Rogan process begins with the creation of a freehand base design in a single color, similar to traditional Rogan painting, but without folding the fabric. Once the base pattern is complete, additional colors are applied over it using fine brushes. In some cases, glitter or mica is incorporated to enhance the visual richness and create a shimmering effect.

== Honorary doctorate ==
On 7 July 2026, Rogan art practitioner Ashish Shantilal Kansara was awarded an honorary Doctor of Literature (D.Litt.) degree by Dr. A.P.J. Abdul Kalam Technical University (AKTU) Lucknow. The honour was conferred by the Governor of Uttar Pradesh, Anandiben Patel, during the university's 24th convocation ceremony in recognition of his contributions to preserving the traditional Rogan painting.

Three Styles of Rogan Painting

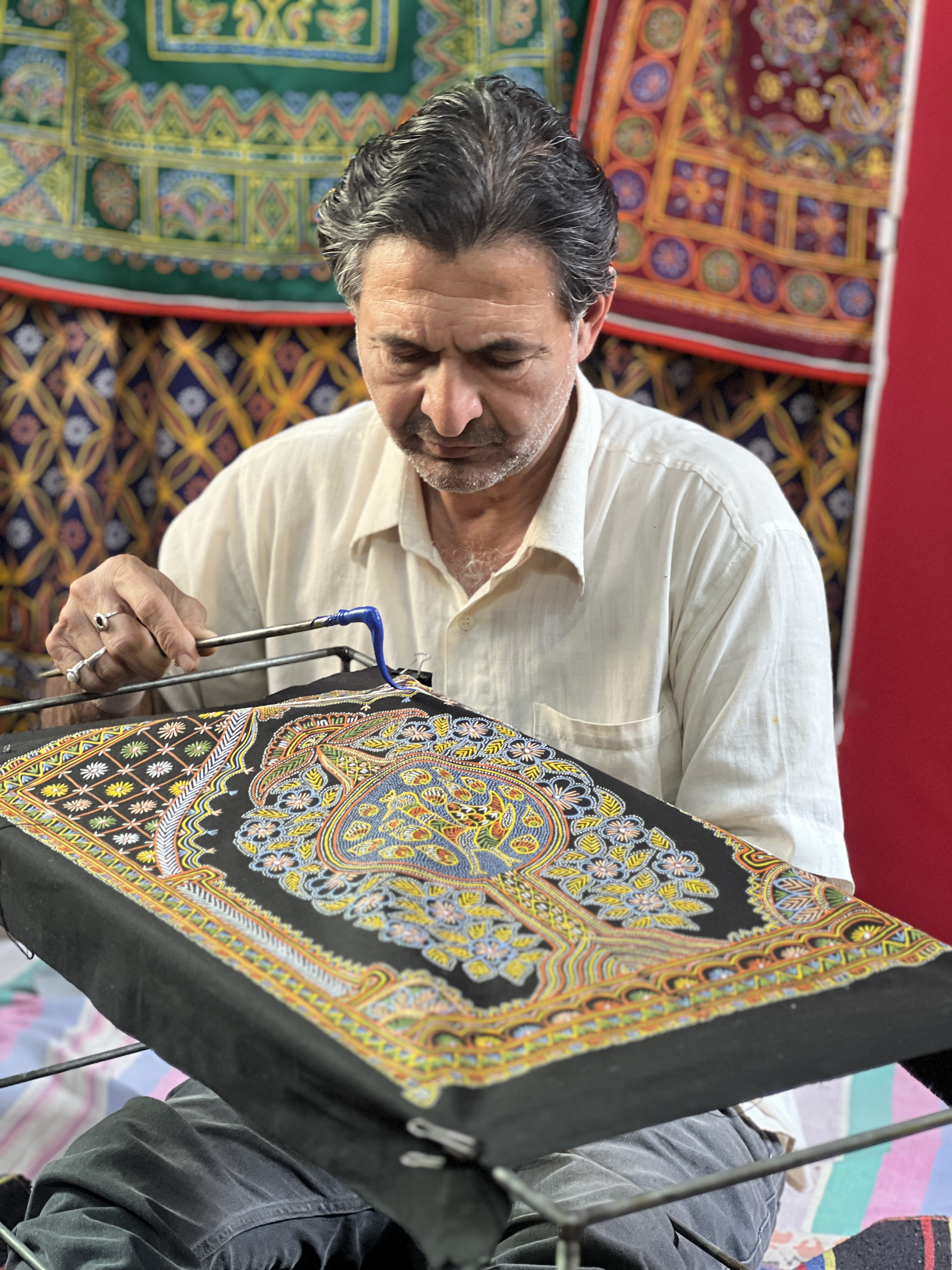
Rogan painting

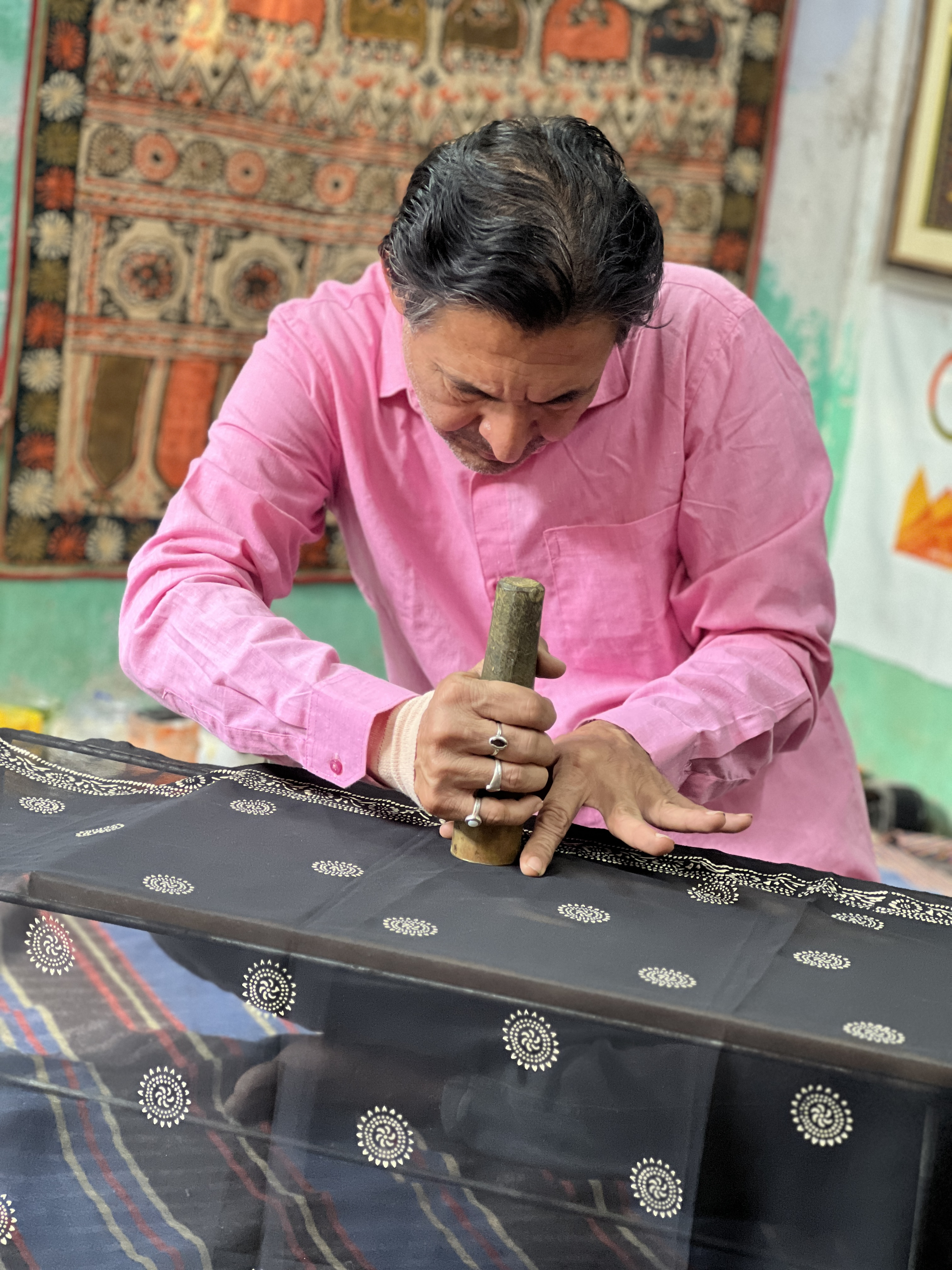
Nirmika Rogan Art

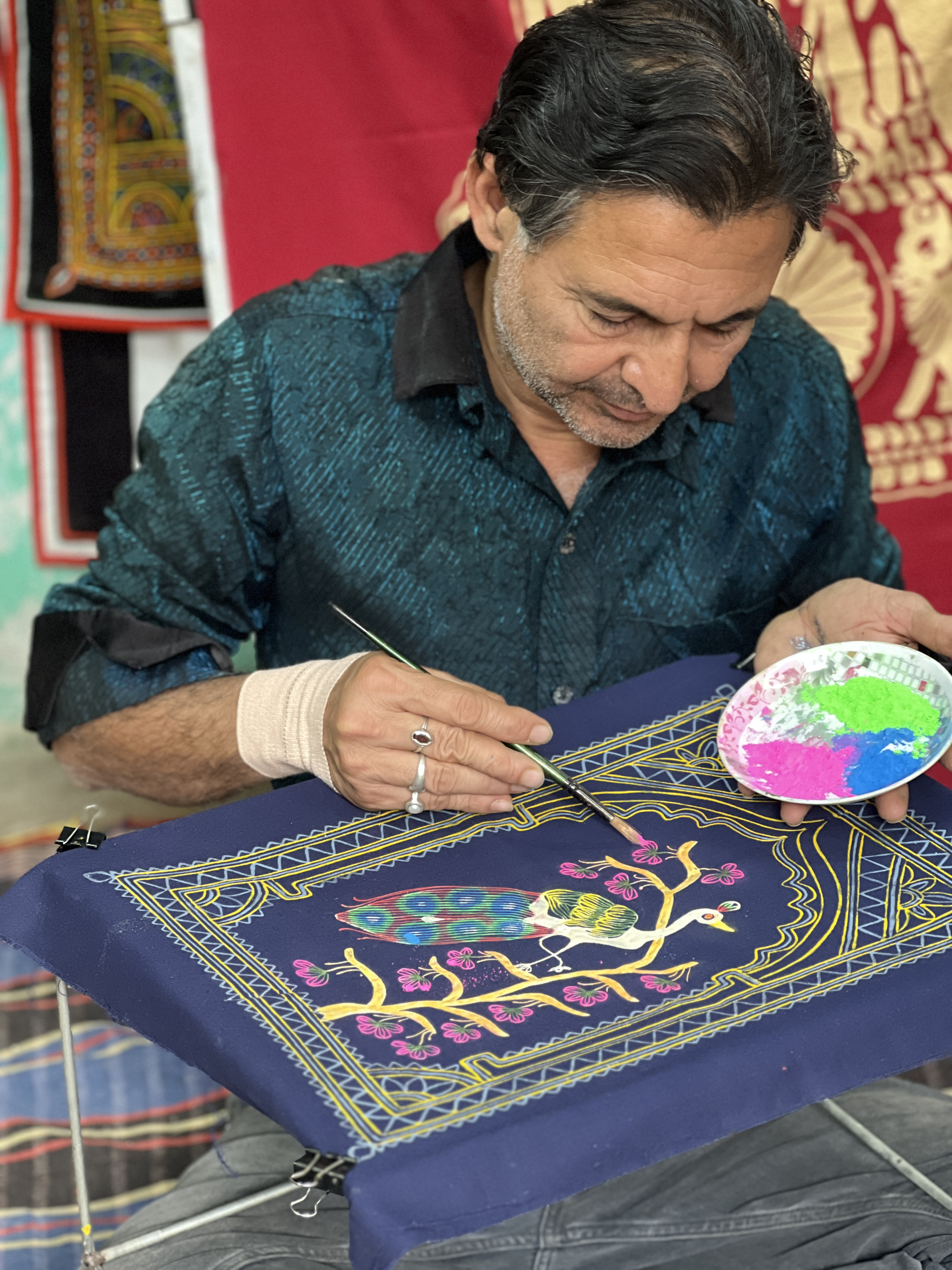
Varnika Rogan Art

== Resurgence ==
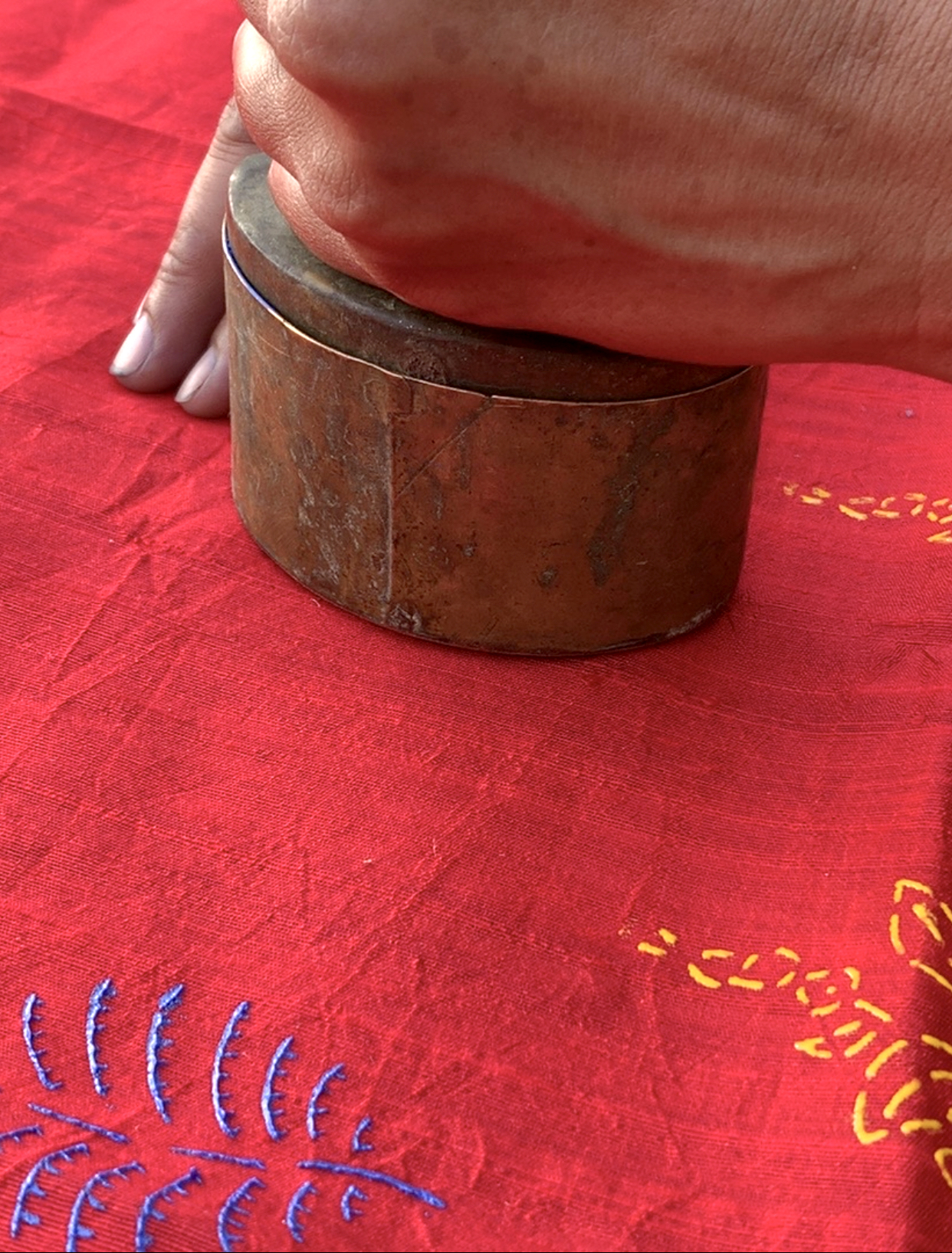
Brass biba (Mould) for Nirmika Rogan printing, Madhapar

In the late 20th and early 21st centuries, several factors came together to bring about a renewed interest in rogan painting, especially painting. First, after the devastation of the 2001 Gujarat earthquake, the water and electricity infrastructure was improved, new roads were built, and the number of flights into the region was increased, all of which led to an increase in tourism. Second, helped local artisans, including rogan artist like Ashish S Kansara to increase their market by selling in urban settings and on-line. Third, many artisans won state and national awards for their craft, thus increasing the prestige of their work. When Prime Minister Narendra Modi visited the U.S. White House, he gave President Obama two rogan paintings, including a tree of life painted by Abdul Gafur Khatri, a national award winner.

Artisans in Gujarat have introduced contemporary products to appeal to tourists, lehengas, wallets, bags, cushion covers, table cloths, wall hanging, pillow covers and Rogan art sarees. The tree of life continues to be a major motif. The number of tourists to the artisans workshop increased steadily in the 2010s to as many as 400 people per day, causing traffic jams in the village. In an attempt to keep up with increased demand of rogan painting, in 2010 the artist Abdulgafur Khatri began to train women for the first time. Previously, it had been feared that women would spread the secrets of the craft when they married out of the family. In 2015, twenty women were working with the Abdulgafur Khatri Padma Shri Award family in Nakhtrana Kutch Gujarat, while a forty worked with the Ashish Kansara and Komal Kansara family in Madhapar village, Kutch, Gujarat.

Following the COVID-19 pandemic in 2020, the number of the tourists visiting them dropped significantly and the women working with them were. Kansara family members were left to work on the craft. Vasudev Kansara is youngest Rogan artist of Kansara family.

== See also ==
- Woodblock printing on textiles
