= Rta Kapur Chishti =

Sari historian and a textile scholar

Ṛta Kapur Chishti is a sari historian and a textile scholar.

== Education ==
Ṛta Kapur Chishti conducted her undergraduate studies in Political Science from Lady Shri Ram College. She then studied at the School of Drama. She then pursued a degree in education from Delhi University in 1971.

== Career ==
She is the co-author and editor of two books namely ‘Saris: Tradition and Beyond’ and 'Handcrafted Indian Textiles: Tradition and Beyond'. Saris of India: Tradition and Beyond, published in 2010 and co-authored by Martand Singh, enumerates a hundred and eight variations of draping the Sari. The book is a comprehensive compendium of different Sari weaving and wearing traditions in India, covering 15 states of India and countless variations of colour, weave and pattern from each state, besides documenting 108 methods of draping a Sari.

In 2009, Ṛta Kapur initiated the ‘Sari School’ in New Delhi. The school conducts workshops for young locals, expatriate women, fashion designers and anyone who would like to learn different ways to wearing the sari. The Sari School also teaches individuals the history and various methods of tying the Sari.

In 2011, Ṛta Kapur founded TaanBaan to preserve and enhance the handspun handwoven techniques. TaanBaan works with artisans across different states and creates saris that strike a balance between traditional skill and contemporary appeal.

In 2017, Rta Kapur was advisor for the non-profit initiative 'The Sari Series: An Anthology of Drape' created by Border&Fall. The Sari Series is a digital anthology documenting India's regional drapes through short films.
