= Abdul Gafur Khatri =

Rogan artist from Kutch, Gujarat, India

- Born: 28-04-1965; Kutch district, Gujarat, India
- Occupation: artist
- Known for: Rogan art with Tree of Life motif
- Awards: Padma Shri award in 2019; National Award in 1997; State Award in 1988

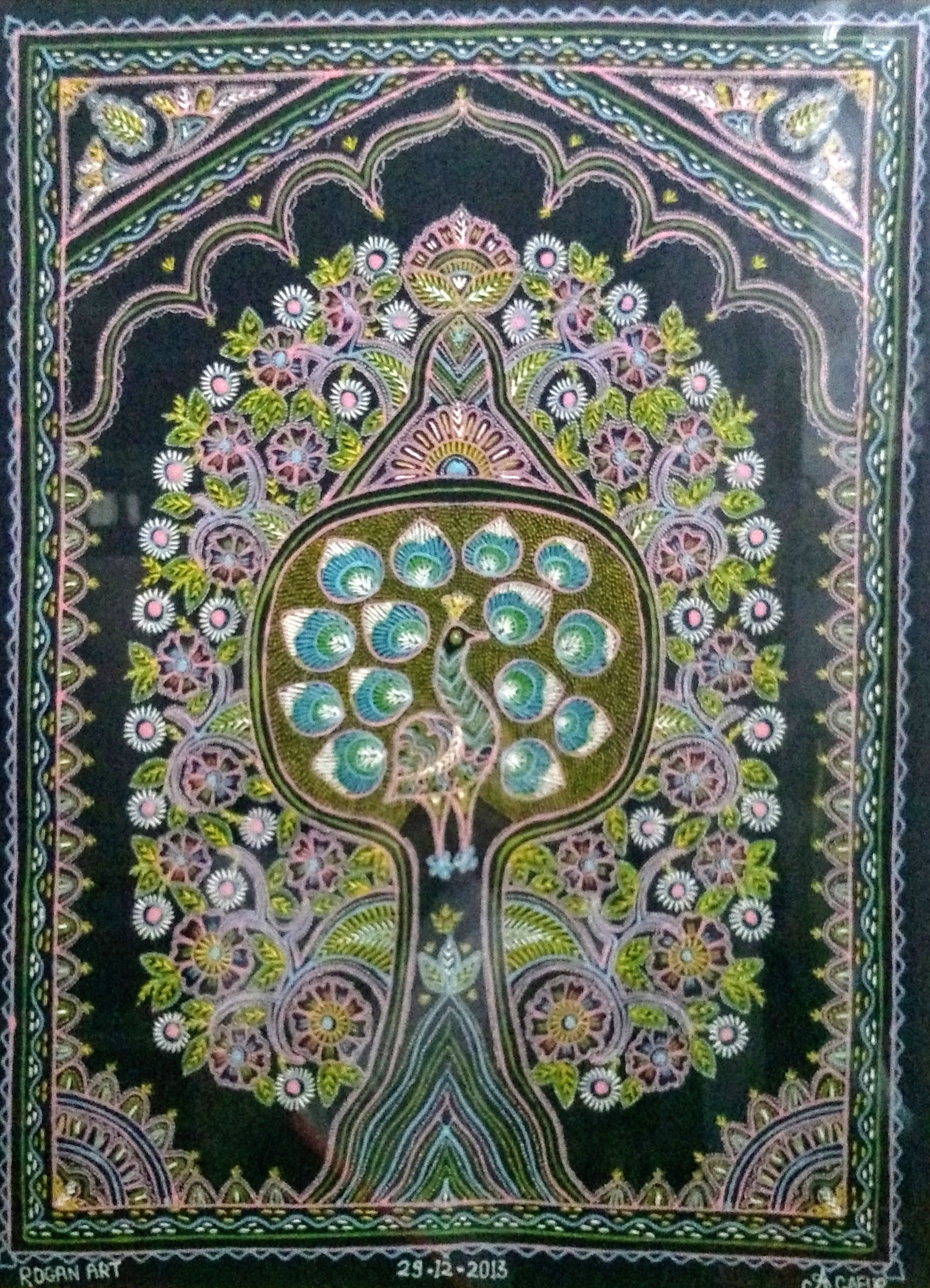
Rogan art with Tree of Life motif, Created by Abdul Gafur Khatri.in Nirona Village Kutch

Abdul Gafur Khatri Master is a rogan artist from the Nirona village of the Kutch district in Gujarat, India.

== Biography ==
Abdulgafur Khatri was born in a family of rogan artists from Nirona village in Kutch. It was the one of khatri family of Rogan artists. In the 1980s, Abdulgafur Khatri left Nirona and moved to Ahmedabad and then Mumbai for employment. Two years later, he returned and learned the art from his father and grandfather. Rogan painting saw a resurgence due to his efforts. In addition, Abdulgafur Khatri and his family began training girls in the art which had previously been practised only by males. In 2014, Indian Prime Minister Narendra Modi visited the U.S. White House, and gave President Obama two rogan paintings, including a tree of life, which were painted by Abdulgafur Khatri and his younger brother Sumar Khatri

== Awards ==
Abdulgafur Khatri was awarded the National Merit certificates in 1988, the State Award in 1989, the National Award in 1997, and the State Certificate BY CM of Gujarat in 2013. He was also awarded the Padma Shri, the fourth highest civilian award by the Government of India in 2019, and the Gujarat Tourism and Travel Excellence Award in 2021.
