= Bagh Caves =

Buddhist caves in India

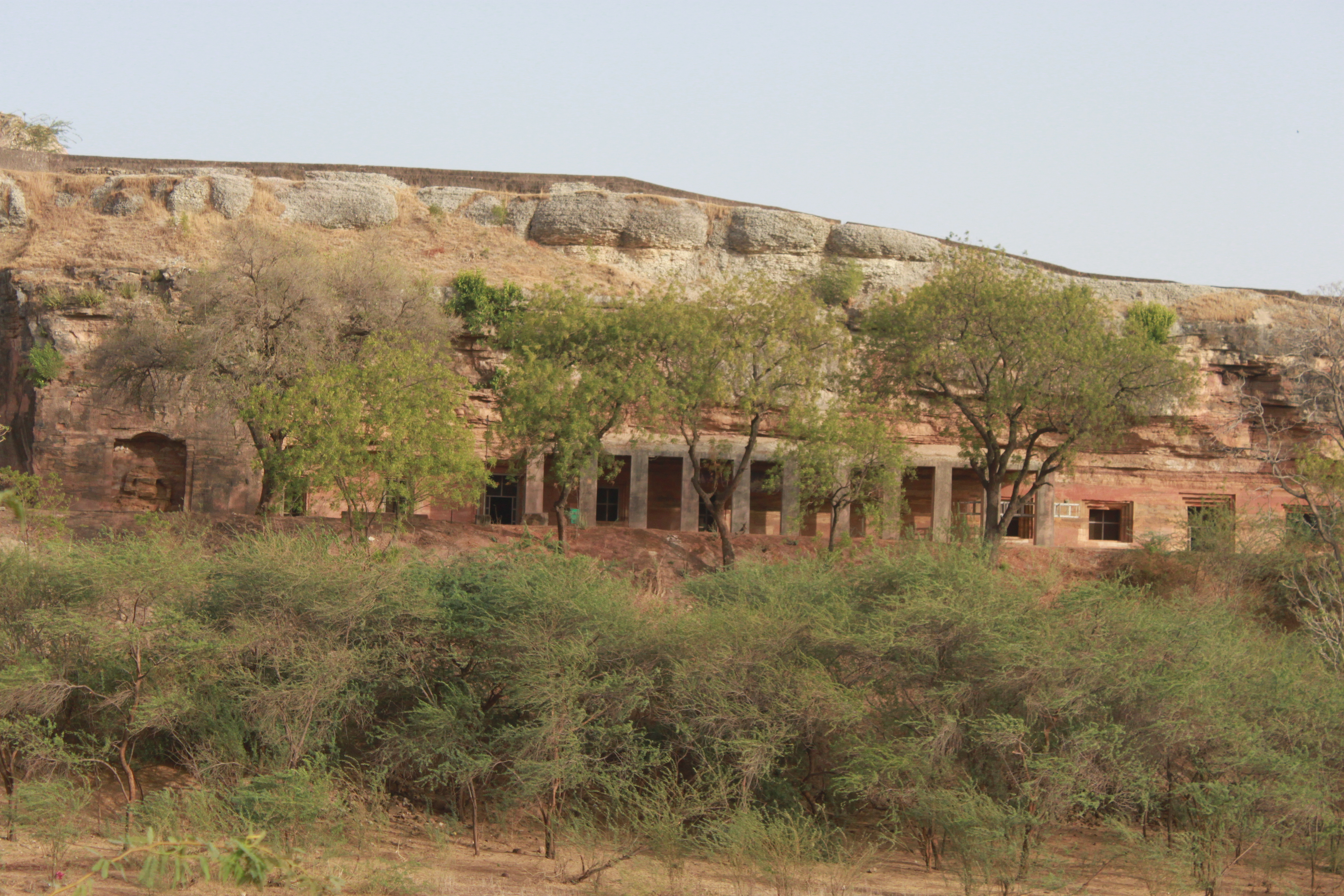
- The Bagh caves

- Location within Madhya Pradesh Location within India
- 22°19′21.63″N 74°48′22.36″E
- Type: Buddhist caves

The Bagh Caves are a group of nine rock-cut monuments, situated among the southern slopes of the Vindhya Range in Bagh town of Dhar district in Madhya Pradesh in central India. These monuments are located at a distance of 97 km from Dhar town. These are renowned for mural paintings by master painters of ancient India. The caves are examples of Indian rock-cut architecture, rather than naturally formed.

The Bagh caves, like those at Ajanta, were excavated by master craftsmen on perpendicular sandstone rock face of a hill on the far bank of a seasonal stream, the Baghani. Buddhist in inspiration, of the nine caves, only five have survived. All of them are 'viharas' or resting places of monks monasteries having quadrangular plan. A small chamber, usually at the back, forms the 'chaitya', the prayer hall. Most significant of these five extant caves is the Cave 4, commonly known as the Rang Mahal (Palace of Colors).

The Bagh Caves were quarried in the 5th-6th century AD, in the very late stages of Buddhism in India, and long after most of the Indian Buddhist caves had been built, many of them since the 2nd or 1st centuries BCE.

They are believed to have been built during the 5th-7th century. The Archaeological Survey of India has restored the caves over 17 years.

== The paintings ==
The paintings on the wall and ceilings of the Viharas of Bagh, the fragments of which are still visible in Cave 3 and Cave 4 (remnants seen also in Caves 2, 5 and 7), were executed in tempera. Cave 2 is the best preserved cave, also known as "Pandava Cave" These paintings are materialistic rather than spiritualistic. Characteristics of paintings are like those of Ajanta Caves. The ground prepared was a reddish-brown gritty and thick mud plaster, laid out on the walls and ceilings. Over the plaster, lime-priming was done, on which these paintings were executed. Some of the most beautiful paintings were on the walls of the portico of Cave 4. To prevent further loss of the values of Indian classical art, most paintings were carefully removed in 1982 and today can be seen in the Gujari Mahal Archeological Museum, in Gwalior.

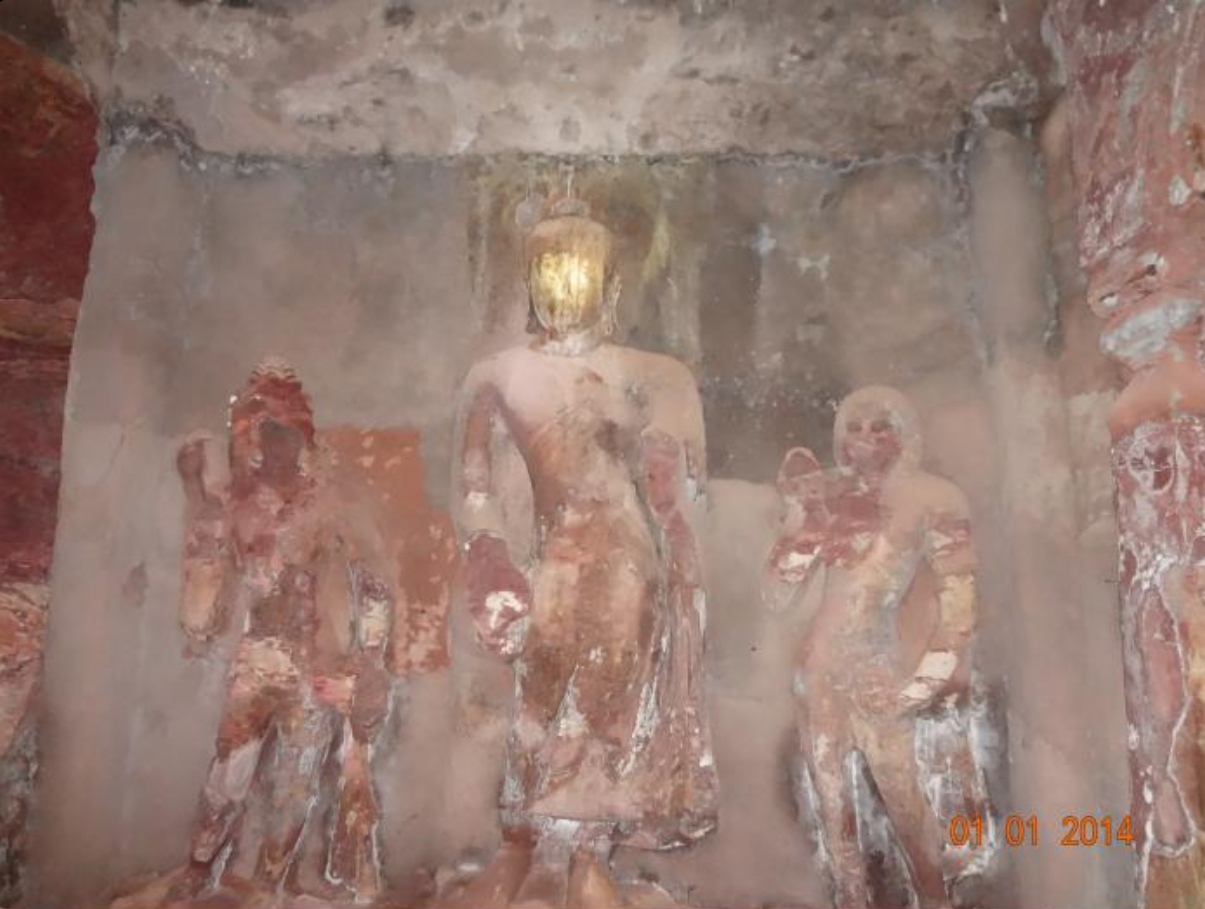
Mural statues

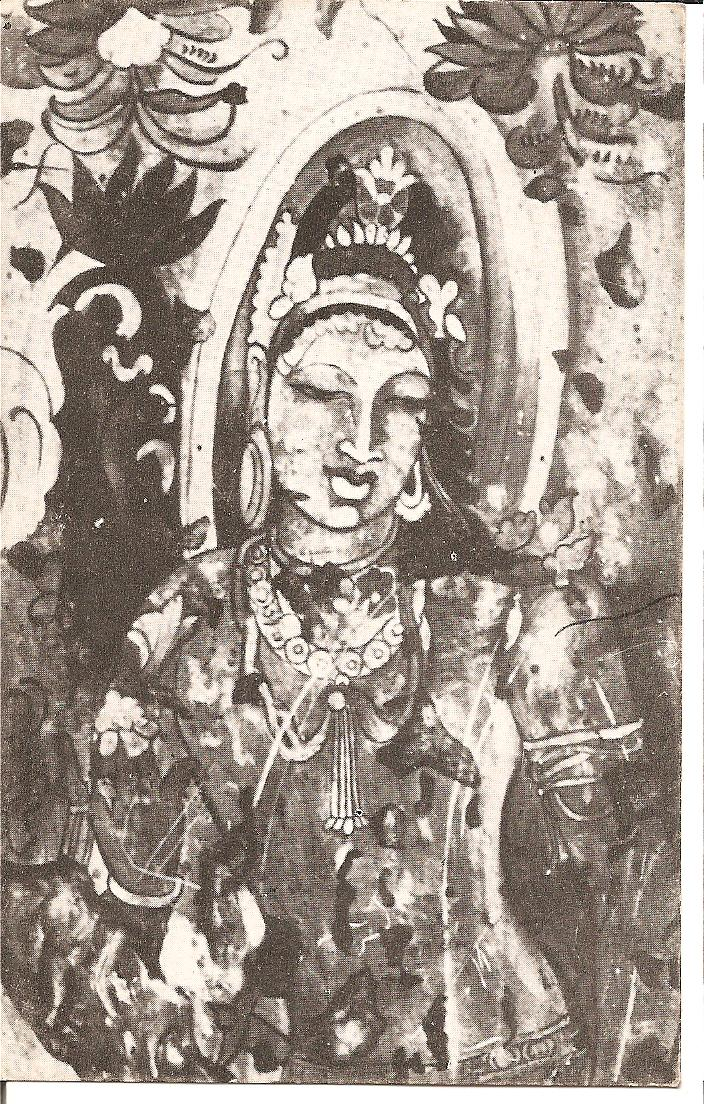
Painting of a Bodhisattva in Bagh Cave 2

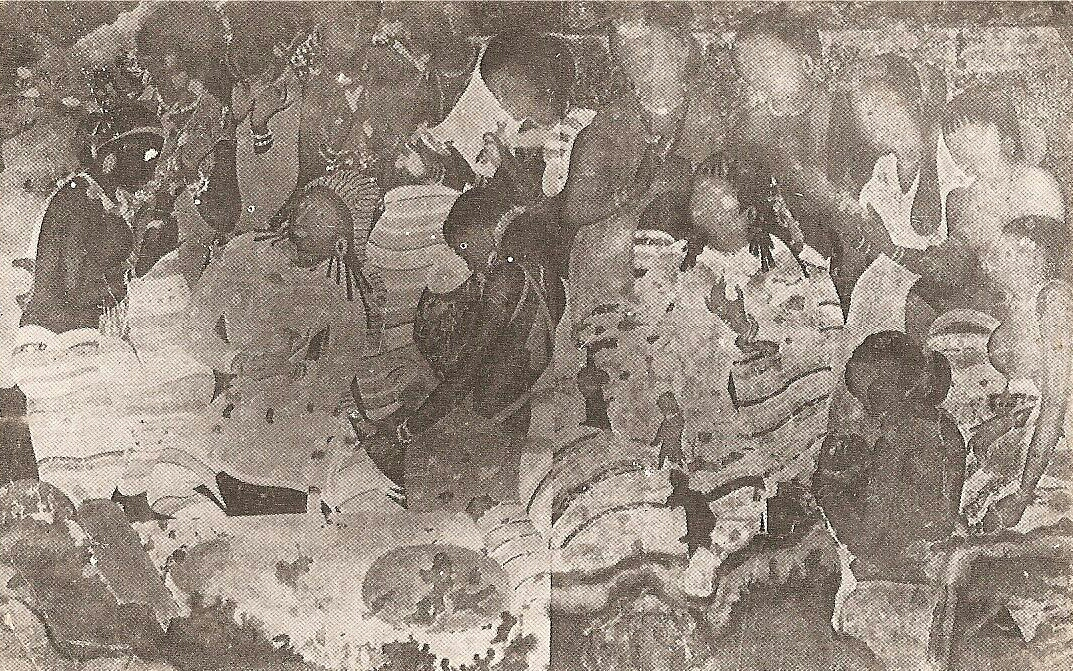
Bagh Cave 4 Details of painting

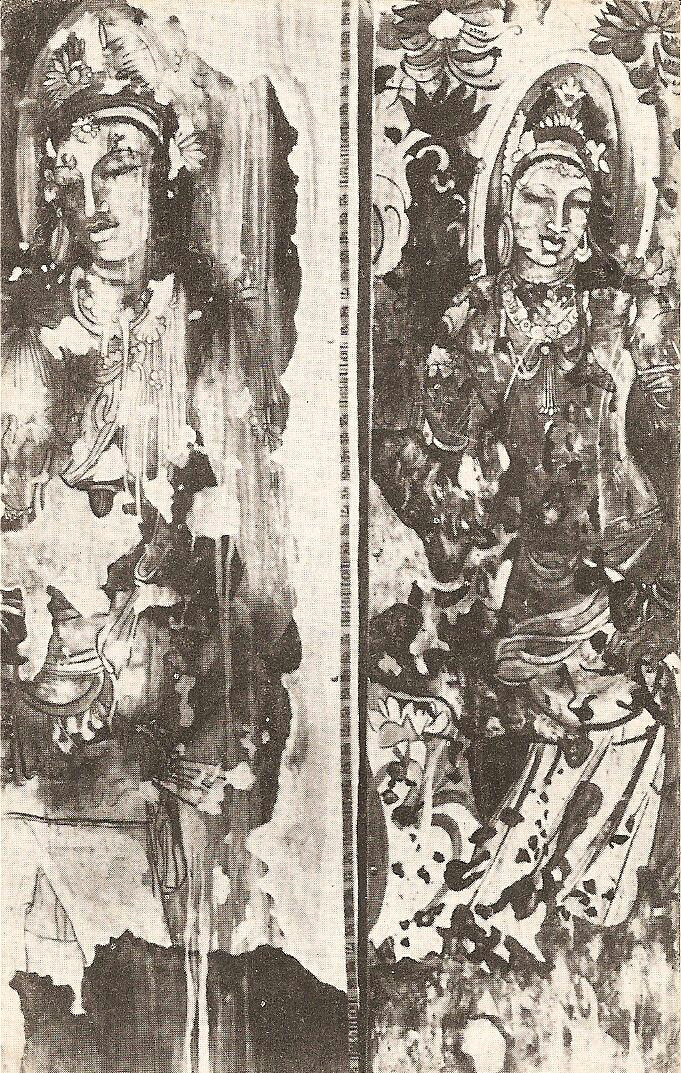
Bagh Caves, Painting of a Bodhisattva

== Date ==
A copperplate inscription of Maharaja Subandhu recording his donation for the repair of the vihara was found at the site of Cave 2. Although the date of the Bagh inscription is missing, his Badwani copperplate inscription is dated in the year (Gupta era) 167 (487); the repair of Cave 2 took place in the late 5th century.

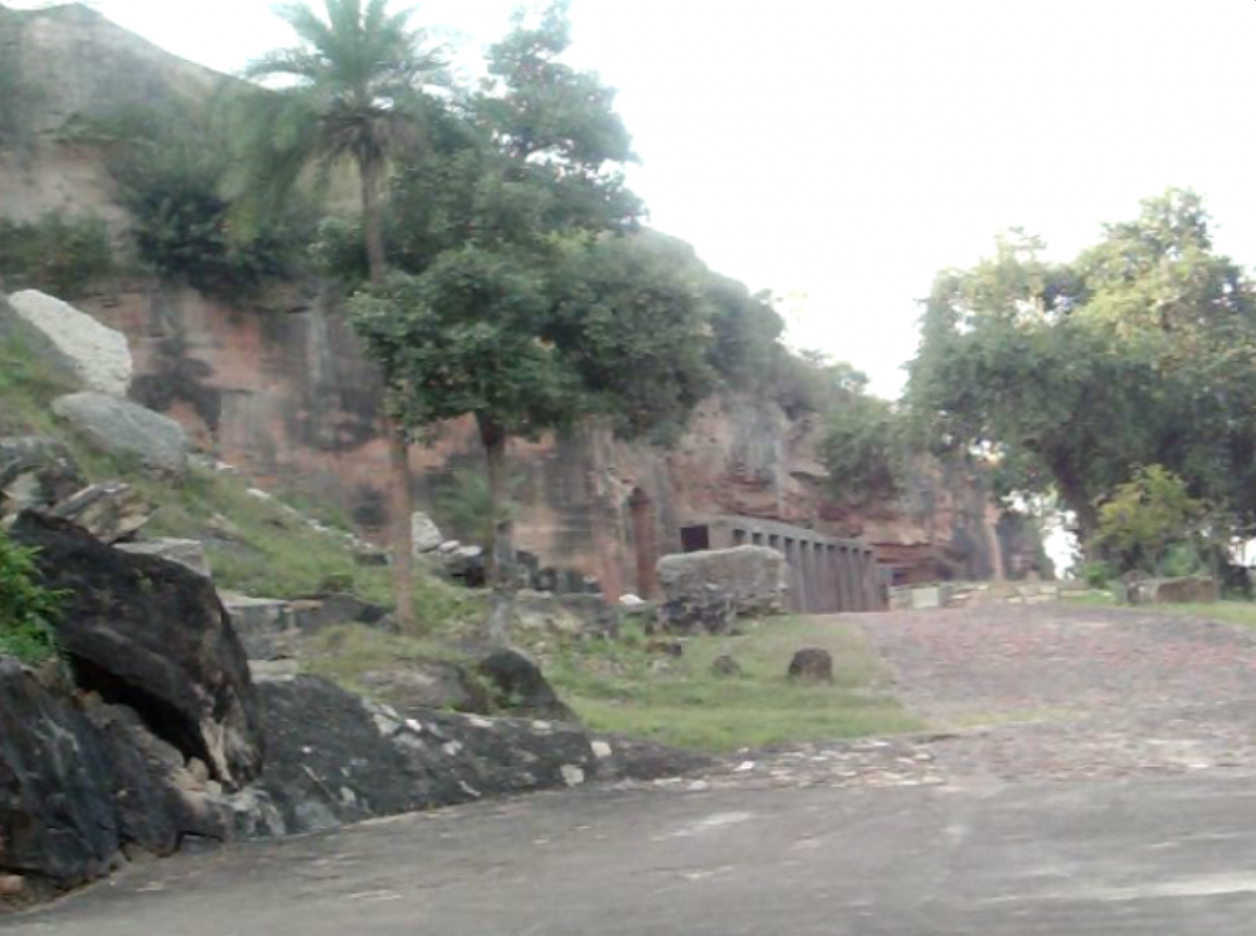
Caves overview

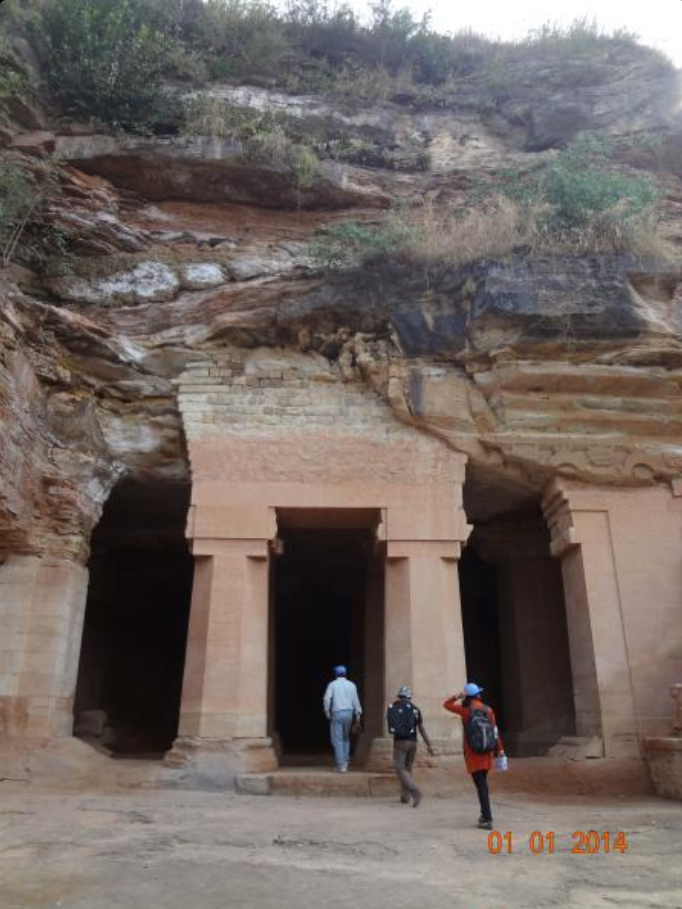
Entrance

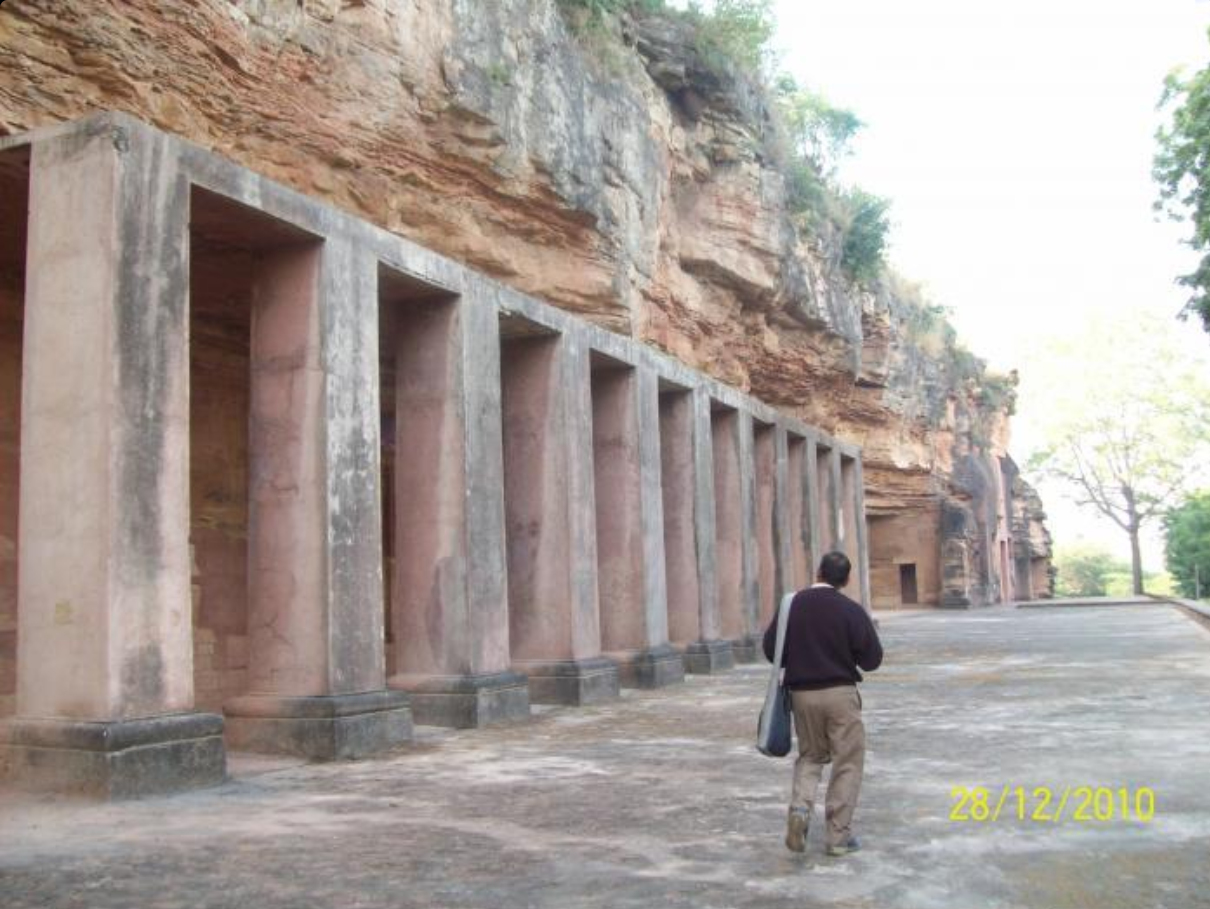
Pillars

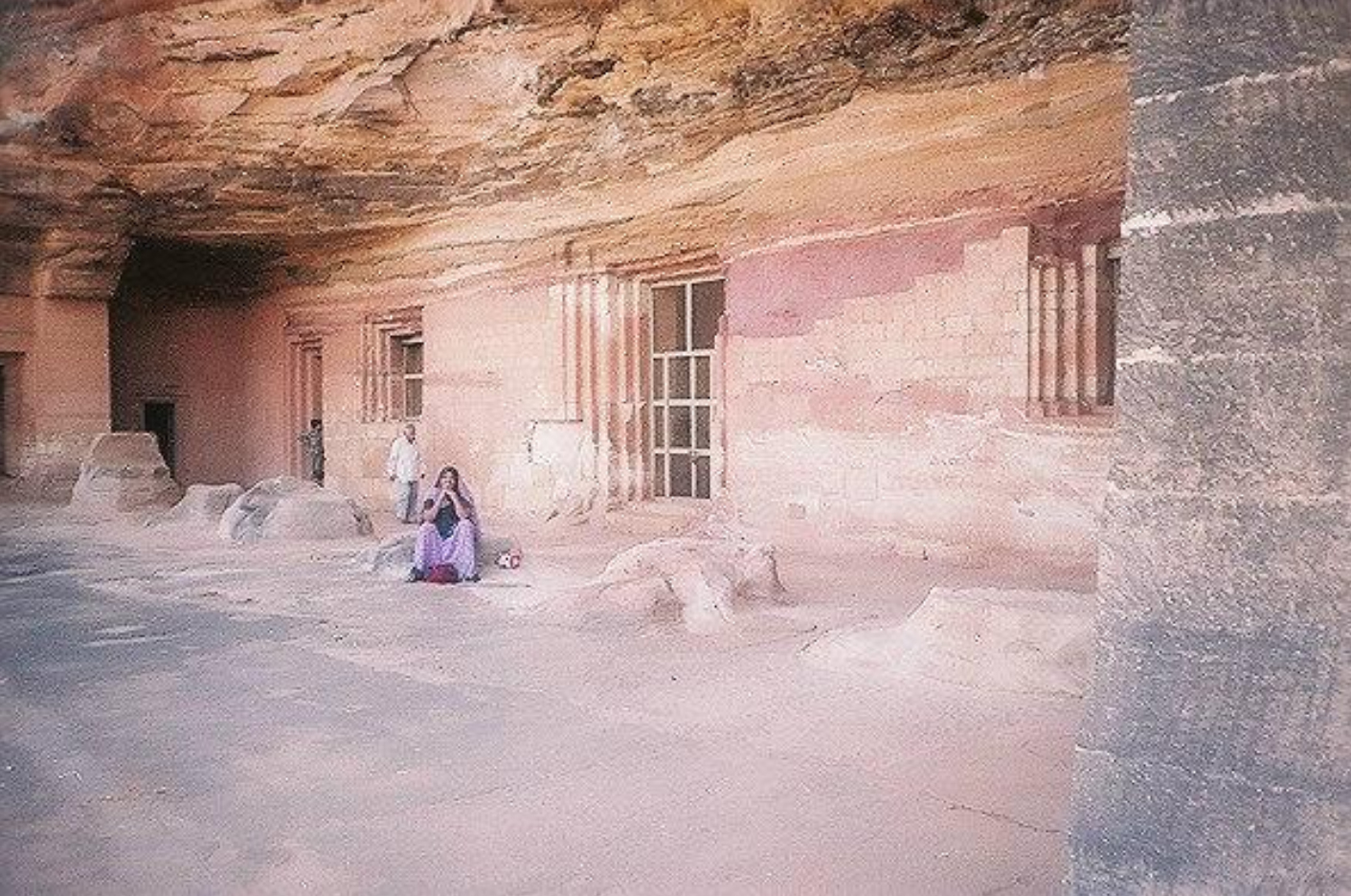
Front of the caves

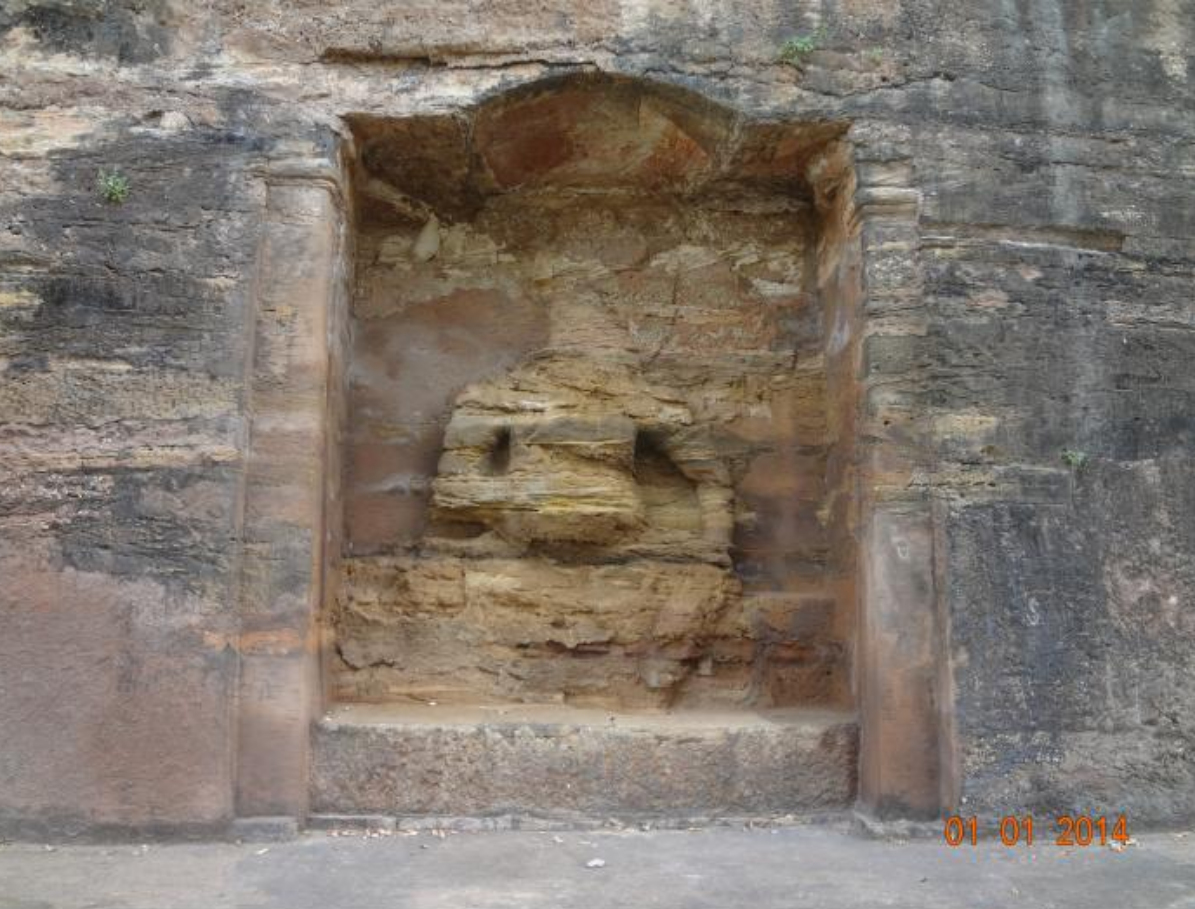
Monumental statues

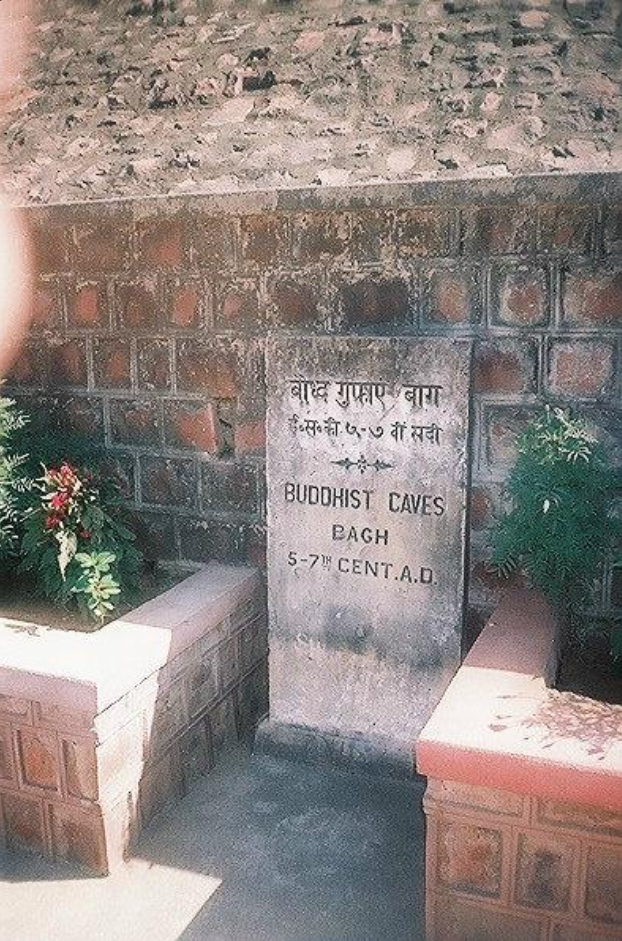
ASI notice.

== See also ==
- Cetiya
- Ajanta Caves
- Bedse Caves
- Bhaja Caves
- Kanheri Caves
- Karla Caves
- Nasik Caves
- Pitalkhora Caves
- Shivneri Caves
- Dambulla cave temple
- Cave paintings in India
