= Poonam Khatri =

Indian martial artist and athlete

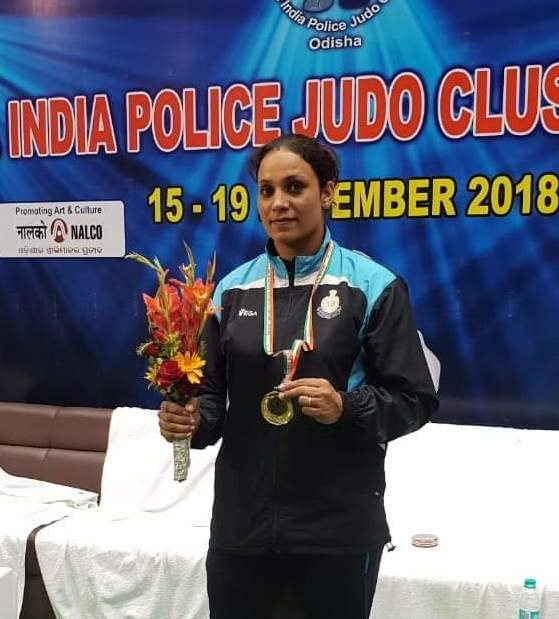

Personal information
- Nationality: Indian
- Born: Poonam Kajla; 15 August 1986 (age 40) Jhajjar, Haryana, India
- Occupations: Wushu player, Boxer and Police officer
- Employer: Sashastra Seema Bal
- Weight: 75 Kg
Medal record
Representing India
Women's Sanda
World Championships
Gold medal – first place	2019 Shanghai	75 Kg
South Asian Games
Gold medal – first place	2019 Nepal	75 Kg
Asian Wushu Championship
Bronze medal – third place	2004 Myanmar	54 Kg
Women's Amateur Boxing
World Police and Fire Games
Gold medal – first place	2013 Belfast	75 Kg

Poonam Khatri is an Indian Wushu player, martial artist and athlete. She won a gold medal in invitational sports of Wushu at the 13th South Asian Games at Lalitpur in Nepal, in Women's Sanda 75 kg. Khatri won the gold medal at the 2019 World Wushu Championships in Shanghai, China in the Women's Sanda 75 kg category.

== Early life ==
She was born in Soldha village of Jhajjar district in Haryana, India. She took to sports in her childhood. In an interview with The Hindu's Sportstar magazine, Khatri said, "As a school kid, I used to play Kabaddi and Kho Kho." Poonam began practicing the martial art Wushu when she was 15 years old.

In 2008, she received a job through sports quota in the Sashastra Seema Bal, one of the Central Armed Police Forces in India, where she is currently posted as an Assistant sub-inspector of police.

== Career ==
In 2003, Khatri became national champion in Wushu for the first time and subsequently in 2004 she made her international debut at the 6th Asian Wushu Championship in Myanmar, where she won a bronze medal for India.

She won the silver medal at the 15th edition of World Wushu Championships (WWC) 2019 held at Minhang Gymnasium in Shanghai, China, but later it was upgraded to Gold Medal when Iran's Maryam Hashemi failed her dope test.

At the 2019 South Asian Games in Nepal, Khatri won a gold medal in the Wushu - 75 kg category.

In November 2019, she was facilitated by Kiren Rijiju, the Minister of State for Youth Affairs and Sports with a cash prize of ₹14 lakh (US$15,000) for winning a medal at World Wushu Championships.

In August 2013, she won a gold medal in the Women's Boxing at the 2013 World Police and Fire Games, held in Belfast, Ireland. She is a 10-time National Champion and has also won medals at all-India police boxing tournaments.

== Personal life ==
Poonam is married to Manjeet Khatri, who works in the Indian Air Force. The couple has a baby girl named Paridhi.
