= Mohammed Rafik Khatri =

Indian craftsman

- Known for: Bagh Print
- Awards: National Award 2005

Mohammed Rafik Khatri is an Indian craftsman from the village of Bagh, Madhya Pradesh. He is Bagh Print craftsman.

== Awards ==
- National Award 2005 (Handicraft) by ministry of textiles, government of India.
- National Merit Award 2004 (Handicraft) by ministry of textiles, government of India.
- State Award 2002 by government of Madhya Pradesh.
