= Pembarthi =

Village in Jangaon district, Telangana, India

Pembarthy is a village in Jangaon district, Telangana, India. As per a recent report by MCRHRDI, population of Pembarthy is 4096 with 1065 households consisting of 2145 male and 2151 females

Pembarthy is famous for its metal handicrafts and brass works. Many of the villagers are skilled in sculpting statues and awards for presentations. Metal art profession, known locally as Vishwakarma employs around 600 workers in Pembarthy.

Location coordinates : 17.6899°N 79.1167°E
