= Walter Spink =

American art historian (1928–2019)

Walter M. Spink(February 16, 1928 – November 23, 2019) was an American art historian who was best known for his extensive study of Buddhist art in India, particularly the Ajanta Caves, a UNESCO World Heritage Site. About his work on the Ajanta caves, scholars have acknowledged that his ideas "revolutionized the history of the site". He was a professor of art history at the University of Michigan, Ann Arbor.

== Biography ==
Spink was born in Worcester, Massachusetts and went to Amherst College, where he studied philosophy and Western art history, graduating in 1949. He then went to Harvard University where he was drawn to Indian art, after being influenced by Benjamin Rowland, who was among the first Western art historians to explore Indian art. At Harvard, Spink received his MA and then PhD in 1954 on the "Rock Cut Monuments of the Andhra Period". From 1956 to 1961, he taught at Brandeis University, and thereafter joined University of Michigan, where he remained till his retirement in 2000.

=== Work on Ajanta Caves ===
Spink's major contribution was to interpret the Ajanta Caves, a Buddhist complex of caves near Aurangabad, Maharashtra, that was carved between 2nd century BCE and 1st century CE. He started studying the complex in the 1950s, and analysed the caves for over four decades in almost 100 publications. The culmination of his research was the Ajanta: History and Development series published by Brill in Leiden, Netherlands.

== Books ==
- Spink, Walter M. (2005). Ajanta, History and Development, Volume 1: The End of the Golden Age. Leiden, Netherlands: Brill Publishers. ISBN 978-9004205710.
- Spink, Walter M. (2006). Ajanta: History and Development, Volume 2: Arguments about Ajanta. Leiden, Netherlands: Brill Publishers. ISBN 978-90-04-15072-0.
- Spink, Walter M. (2005). Ajanta: History and Development, Volume 3: The Arrival of the Uninvited. Leiden, Netherlands: Brill Publishers. ISBN 978-90-04-14833-8.
- Spink, Walter M. (2008). Ajanta: History and Development, Volume 4: Painting, Sculpture, Architecture - Year by Year. Leiden, Netherlands: Brill Publishers. ISBN 978-90-04-14983-0.
- Spink, Walter M. (2006). Ajanta: History and Development, Volume 5: Cave by Cave. Leiden, Netherlands: Brill Publishers. ISBN 978-90-04-15644-9.
- Spink, Walter M. (2014). Ajanta: History and Development, Volume 6: Defining Features. Leiden, Netherlands: Brill Publishers. ISBN 978-90-04-18015-4.
- Spink, Walter M. (2017). Ajanta: History and Development, Volume 7: Bagh, Dandin, Cells and Cell Doorways. Leiden, Netherlands: Brill Publishers. ISBN 978-90-04-31968-4.
