= Gul Muhammad Khatri =

Pakistani artist, painter and writer

Gul Muhammad Khatri (1919–1979) was an artist, painter and writer living in Karachi, Pakistan. He produced art works in the form of portraits, landscape art, and calligraphic illustrations of Sufi poetry (especially poetry of Shah Abdul Latif Bhitai). He also did commercial art work in the form of poster design, glass painting, sign board, textile design, theatrical design, cinema posters, tile design as well as Sindhi, Urdu, Hindi, Gujarati and English calligraphy.

Khatri was also a prolific writer, authoring many articles and essays on Pakistani and Indus art and literature in Sindhi and Urdu languages, which were published in different newspapers and periodicals. Due to his lifelong interest in the art of the Indus Valley, he was known as Mussawar-e-Latif and Founder of the Indus Art.

He learned art from his teacher Charanjit Singh Wordi under whose mentorship he studied for about 12 years.

In 1967, Khatri founded Mehran Cultural Association to develop Indus art and literature and was elected its President.

In 2010, along with other notable Sindh artists, Gul Munhammed Khatri was posthumously honoured with a special shield in acknowledgement of services to Sindh Art at a seminar organised by the Institute of Art and Design University of Sindh.

Khatri's publications include

- Shah Abdul Latif, Art Edition Part I, with translation in Urdu and English, which has been recommended by the Government of Sindh for public libraries;
- Naqoosh-e-Latif with translation in Urdu, English, Gujarati and Hindi; unpublished – manuscript was handed over to the Culture Department, Government of Sindh for publication but afterwards was reported lost.
