= Mohammed Yusuf Khatri =

Indian craftsman

- मोहम्मद युसूफ खत्री
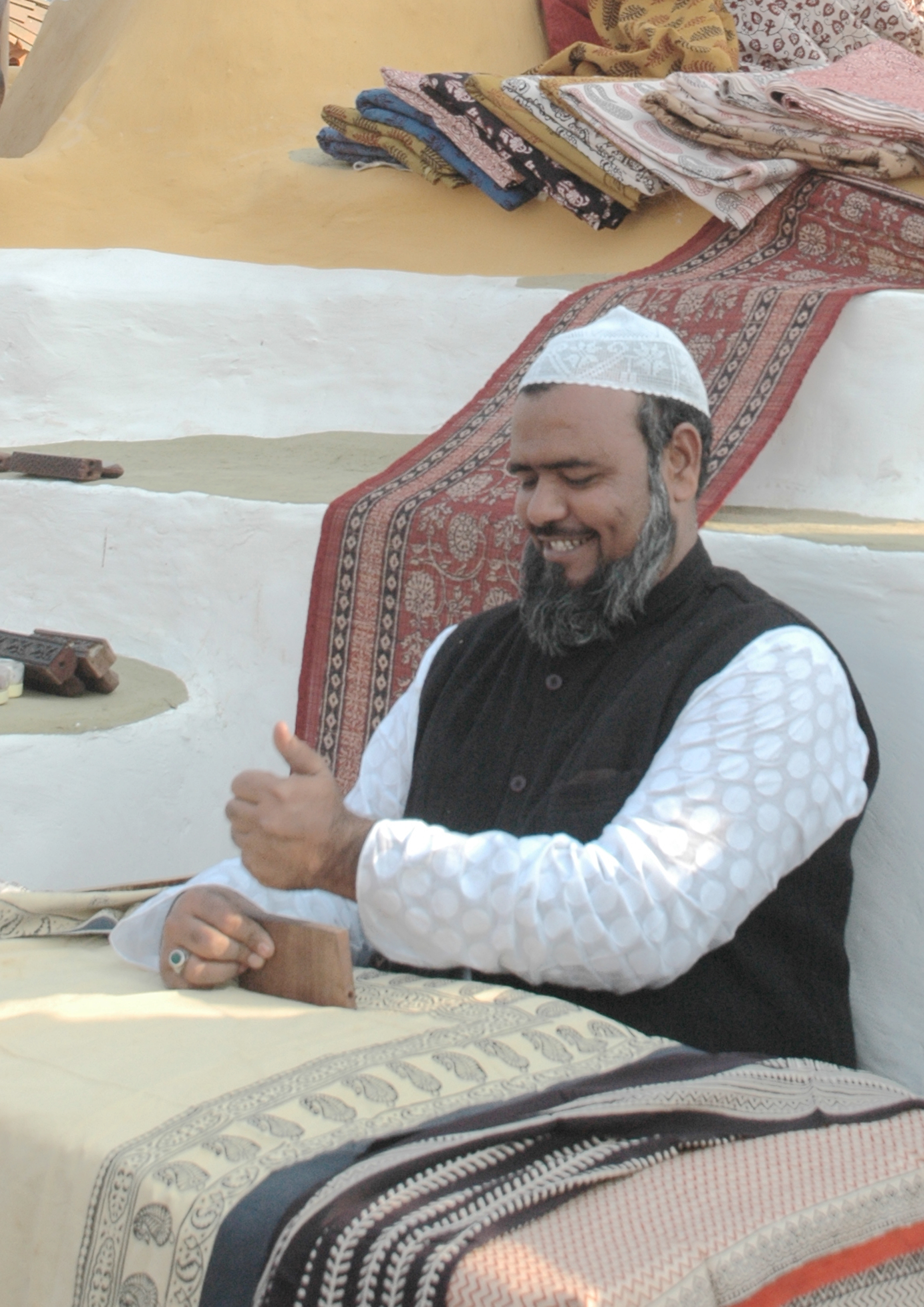
- Giving live demo of traditional Bagh Hand Block Printing on Bagh Print Tableau Delhi Republic Day parade, 2011
- Born: 1 January 1967 (age 59); Bagh, Madhya Pradesh, India
- Known for: Bagh Print, hand block print, natural printing and dyeing
- Notable work: hand block printing on bamboo mat & leather
- Spouse: Hasina Khatri
- Children: Mohammed Bilal; Mohammed Kazeem; Rukhsar; Abdul Karim
- Awards: National award handicrafts & handlooms 2003; International UNESCO Award of Excellence 2014,

Mohammed Yusuf Khatri (born:January 1, 1967) is an Indian master craftsman from Madhya Pradesh.

== Early life and education ==
Khatri was born on 1 January 1967 in Bagh, Madhya Pradesh, where he had learnt the traditional Craft of Bagh Print at a young age from his parents. His family has been working in the trade of traditional Alizarin Bagh print since 7th century.

== Notable work ==
Earlier Mohammed Yusuf Khatri and his family used to prefabricate different traditional dresses for the persons belonging to different castes living in tribal area of Bagh block of Dhar district of Madhya Pradesh. Because the people of different castes and families had different dresses like Maroo, Jat, Meghwal, Mahajan, Bhil, Bhilala society and they were identified with their dresses. After 1990 Mohammed Yusuf Khatri did new experiments on the clothes for urban market. He did block printing with hand and designed cultural clothing firstly. He also experimented incorporating modernity in the wooden blocks and colours in such a way that its fame and popularity could be established for a long time on the national and international level. He proved his imagination true by making craft on bamboo mat, leather, jute etc. besides cloth, Bagh Print was engraved with natural colours on bamboo chick. This was the first experiment of the world which was completed with colours on bamboo mat. It is notable that before or after popularity of Bagh print in the world, no example of such kind is recorded. Hence it is the first sample of such art in the world.

== Bagh print tableau on republic day parade ==
The tableau of Bagh prints was displayed in republic day celebration parade 2011 from rajpath to red fort. This full tableau was based on live demo of Bagh prints. In this tableau Mohammed Yusuf Khatri exhibited the live demo of Bagh prints craft. on republic day celebration, the craft of Bagh prints was introduced to the former honourable president of india Pratibha Devisingh Patil & Honourable vice president Dr. Hamid Ansari & the then honourable prime minister Dr. Manmohan Singh took the information of excellencies of Bagh prints and admired the craft person a lot.

== Awards and honour ==
=== International ===
- Award of excellence for handicraft by UNESCO 2014
- Seal of Excellence for Handicrafts by UNESCO 2007

=== National ===
- National award 2003 (Handicraft) by ministry of textiles, government of india.
- National award 2003 (Handloom) by ministry of textiles, government of india.

=== State level ===
- State award 1998-1999 by Government of Madhya Pradesh
