= Bagh, Dhar =

Bagh
- Census town
- Location in Madhya Pradesh, India Bagh (India)
- Coordinates: 22.37°N 74.77°E
- Country: India
- State: Madhya Pradesh
- District: Dhar

Government
  - Type: Sarpanch
  - Body: Gram panchayat

Area
  - Total: 4.94 km^{2} (1.91 sq mi)
- Elevation: 240 m (790 ft)

Population (2011)
  - Total: 9,274
  - Density: 1,880/km^{2} (4,860/sq mi)

Languages
  - Official: Hindi
- Time zone: UTC+5:30 (IST)
- PIN: 454221
- Telephone code: 07297
- ISO 3166 code: IN-MP
- Vehicle registration: MP-11
- Spoken Languages: Hindi, Bhili, Bhilali, Nimadi, English, Khatri

Bagh is a census town in Dhar district in the state of Madhya Pradesh, India. It is known for the Bagh Caves, which are late 4th- to 6th-century Buddhist rock-cut chambers with murals. The name of the town stems from the caves - according to local legend there were living tigers (bagh in several languages of India) in these abandoned Buddhist caves.

== History ==
In 1982, a hoard of 27 inscriptions issued by the Maharajas of Valkha was discovered at Risawala near Bagh. The inscriptions were issued from a place known as Valkha, which has led to suggestions that the name "Bagh" is derived from "Valkha". The inscriptions are dated to the years 38-134 of an unspecified calendar era. Historians D. C. Sircar and R. C. Majumdar theorized that the Maharajas of Valkha were subordinates to the Guptas, and the calendar era used in their inscription is the Gupta era starting from 319 CE. Thus, the Maharajas of Valkha can be dated to 4th and 5th centuries CE.

The next known ruler of the region is Maharaja Subandhu of Mahishmati. His Bagh Caves inscription is dated 167 (486 CE, assuming Gupta era). Art historian Walter M. Spink has identified Subandhu as the prince Vishruta mentioned in Dashakumaracharita. According to his theory, Subandhu or Vishruta was a Gupta prince, who established the dynasty that later came to be known as Kalachuri.

== Transport connectivity ==
=== By train ===
Nearest Railway stations are Dahod 100 km., Indore 150 km., Meghnagar 104 km., Ratlam 150 km, Khandwa 220 km.

=== By road ===
Bagh is well connected to Indore by road and Daily Bus Services.

=== By airport ===
The nearest airport is Indore.

== Bagh printing ==
The Khatris are a community whose inward beings dance the Sufi way. They came under the influence of a Sufi man and it stuck a long lasting chord. Originally Ajrakh printers they ventured into places to sell their fabrics and their enterprising ways kept them upfloat. From Larkana in Sind (today's Pakistan) to Pali, to the Marwadi Thar, to Manawar in Madhya Pradesh, their journey came to a stop and they settled down in Bagh in 1962, as they saw their grandfather and uncles returning to their ancestral land (Karachi, Pakistan) during Partition

Bagh is located at 22.37°N 74.77°E. It has an average elevation of 240 metres (787 feet).

== Demographics ==
As of 2011 India census, Bagh had a population of 9,274. Males constitute 51% of the population and females 49%. Bagh has an average literacy rate of 76%, higher than the national average of 59.5%; with 83% of the males and 69% of females literate. 15% of the population is under 6 years of age.

== Education ==
- Mahesh Memorial Public Higher Secondary School, Bagh
- City Convent Higher Secondary School, Bagh
- International Public School, Bagh
- Government School of Excellence, Bagh

== Notable people from Bagh ==
- Abdul Kadar Khatri (1961 - 2019) Master Craftsman
- Mohammed Yusuf Khatri, printer

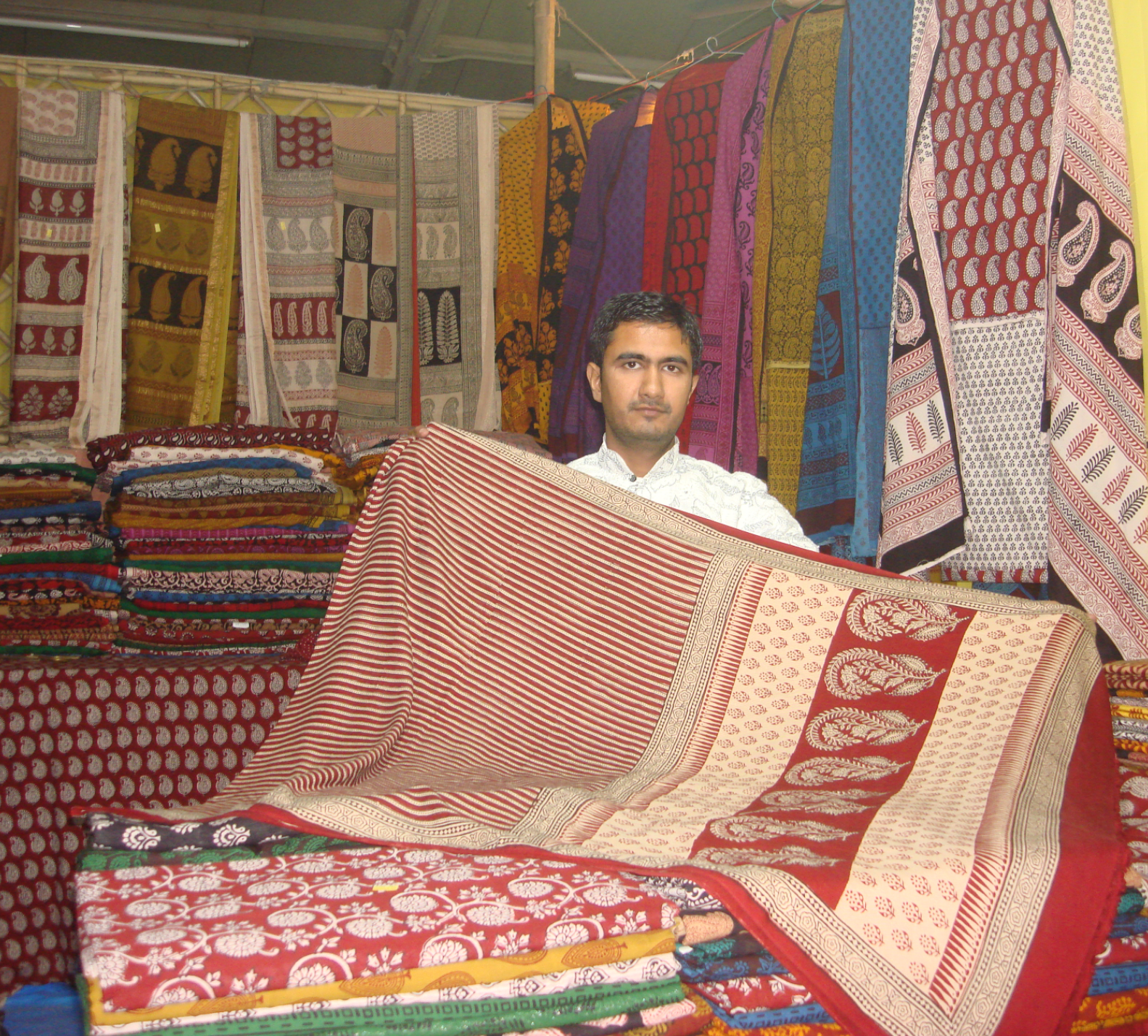
A traditional Bagh Print craftsman from Bagh, Madhya Pradesh
