= Bagru print =

Traditional hand block printing of Bagru, India

Bagru Print
- Geographical indication
- Description: Traditional hand block printing using natural dyes.
- Type: Handicraft
- Area: Bagru, Rajasthan
- Country: India
- Material: Cotton, silk, tussar, kota doria, chanderi

Bagru print is a traditional form of hand block printing originating from the town of Bagru, near Jaipur, in Rajasthan, India. The craft is practiced by the Chhipa community, known for their expertise in dyeing and block printing. It has been an integral part of Rajasthan's textile history for over 400 years.

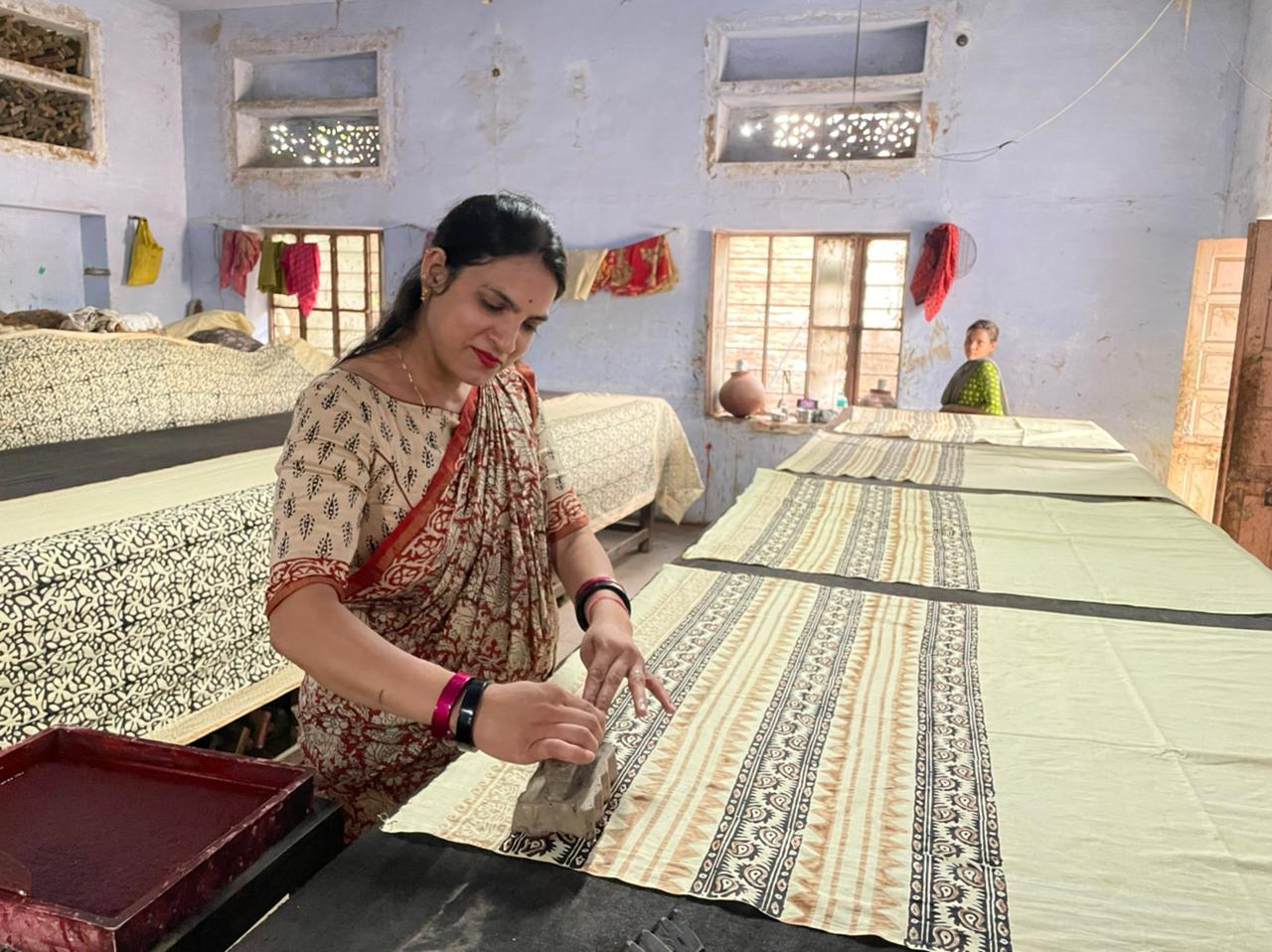
Woman doing Block Printing at Bagru village, Jaipur, India

== History ==
The tradition of Bagru printing is closely tied to the region of Bagru and its local community, the Chippas. The art form is deeply rooted in local culture and has been practiced by generations of artisans. These artisans utilize hand-carved wooden blocks to print intricate designs on cotton fabrics, a technique that has been passed down through the centuries.

The term "Chippa" refers to the artisans involved in both dyeing and block printing, which are vital components of the Bagru printing process.

== Techniques and characteristics ==
The Bagru print is characterized by the use of natural dyes, which are derived from plants and minerals. These dyes include indigo (for blue), madder root (for red), and iron filings (for black). The traditional printing technique involves applying the "Dabu" method, a mud-resist process in which clay, gum, and millet chaff are used to create resist patterns on the fabric.

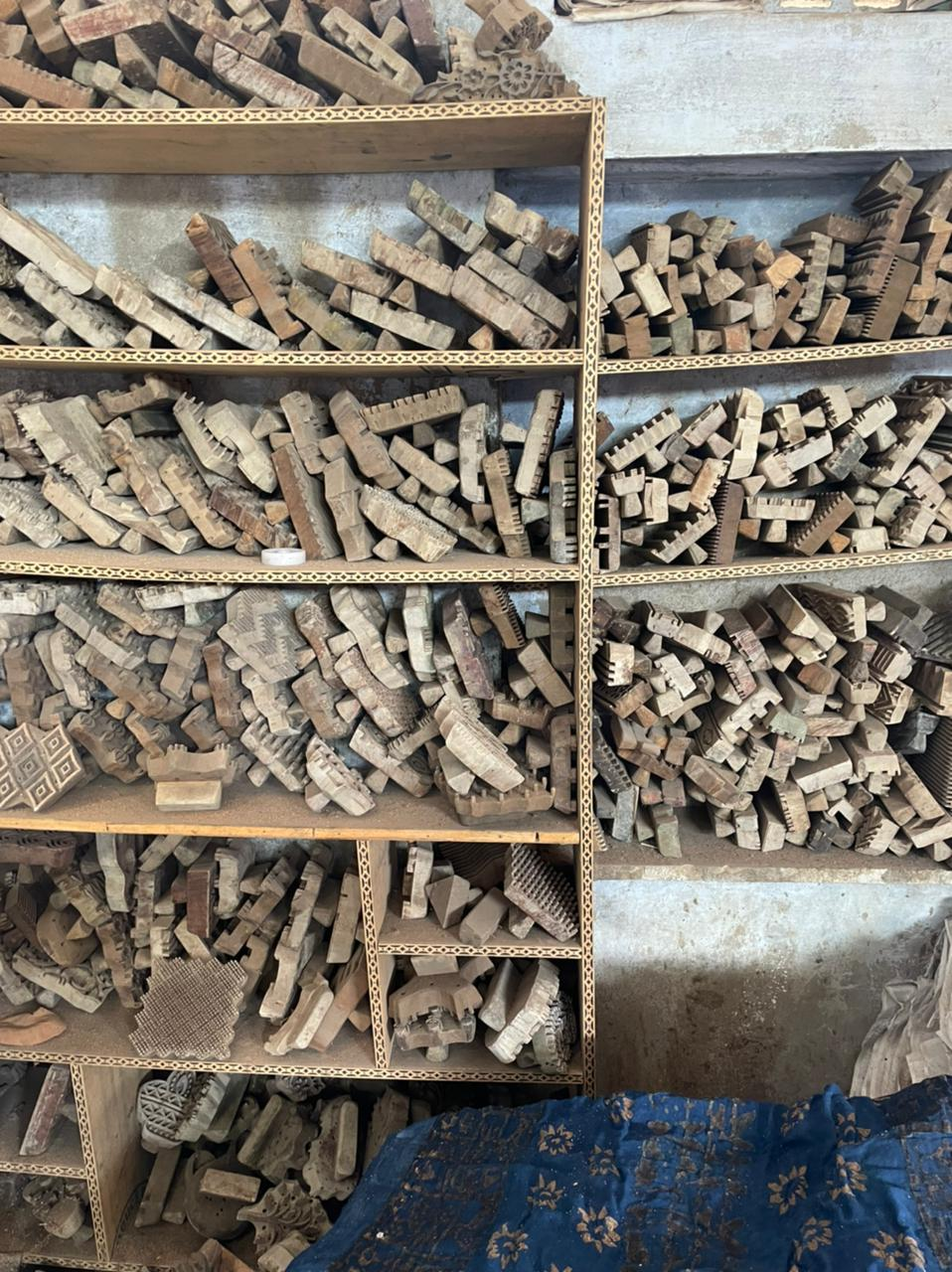
Wooden Printing Block Stamp

Wooden blocks are carved from hardwoods like sheesham or teak, chosen for their durability and ability to hold intricate designs. The process involves carving the block with specialized tools and using it to transfer patterns onto fabric. The resulting designs often feature floral patterns, geometric shapes, and motifs inspired by nature.

== Cultural significance ==
Bagru print has garnered international recognition, with the craft exported to countries such as the United Kingdom, the United States, Germany, Japan, and Australia. The craft has been crucial to the local economy in Rajasthan, supporting countless artisans and their families.

The craft has also been a point of pride in Rajasthan, associated with cultural identity. Prominent figures, including former Prime Minister Indira Gandhi, are known to have worn Bagru print sarees, which contributed to the art's growing popularity.

== Bagru Print GI Tag ==
In 2024, Bagru print was granted the Geographical Indication (GI) tag, which officially recognizes the craft's unique and authentic nature. This designation helps protect the traditional techniques from imitation and ensures that products made with Bagru print are properly identified and associated with their region of origin.

== Challenges ==
The Bagru print industry faces several challenges, including competition from mass-produced textiles and the rise of synthetic dyes, which threaten the preservation of traditional methods. Furthermore, the COVID-19 pandemic disrupted the global demand for Bagru printed textiles, affecting local artisans. However, efforts are being made to preserve the craft by promoting online sales and organizing exhibitions.

== Contemporary practice ==
Bagru print has seen renewed international demand in the 21st century, driven by consumer interest in sustainable and handmade textiles. Jaipur-based producers using the Bagru tradition now supply organic cotton home textiles — including bed linen, cushion covers, and table linen — to buyers in the United States, France, Germany, the United Kingdom, and Australia. Many of these producers operate under GOTS-compliant supply chains, combining traditional Bagru dyeing methods with organic cotton certification standards.

The 2024 GI tag has provided producers with greater protection against mass-market imitation. Craft organizations and government bodies including the Rajasthan Handicrafts Development Corporation continue to support training and market access for Chhipa artisans.

== See also ==
- Bagru
- Block printing in India
- Dabu printing
