= Sabyasachi Mukherjee =

Indian fashion designer (born 1974)

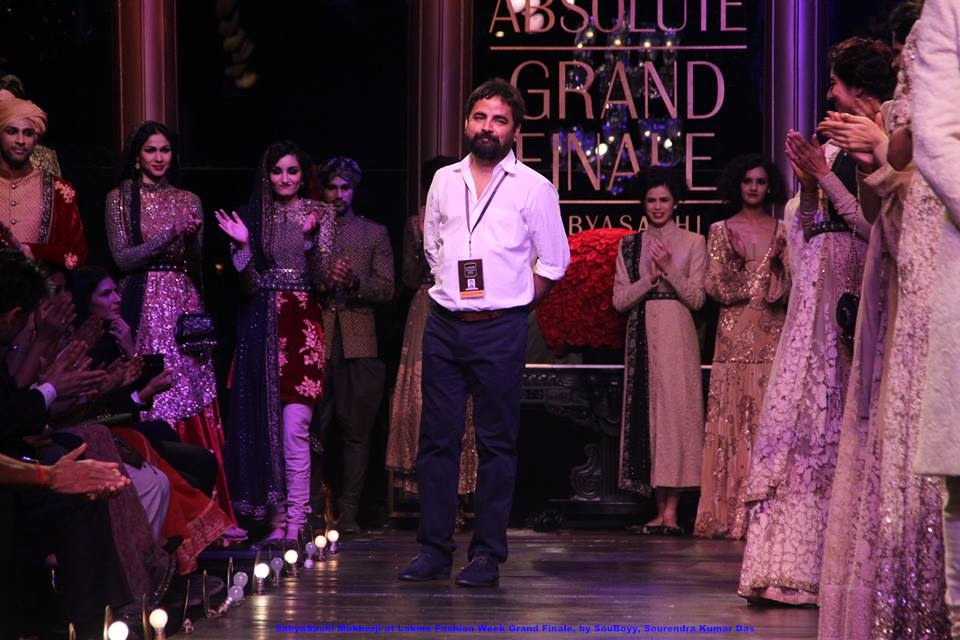
- Mukherjee at Lakme Fashion Week
- Born: 23 February 1974 (age 52); Kolkata, West Bengal, India
- Education: National Institute of Fashion Technology (NIFT); University of Calcutta; Sri Aurobindo Vidyamandir, Chandannagar
- Occupation: Fashion designer
- Label: Sabyasachi

Sabyasachi Mukherjee (born 23 February 1974) is an Indian fashion designer, jewellery designer, retailer, and couturier from Kolkata, West Bengal, India. Since 1999, he has sold designer merchandise using the label Sabyasachi. Mukherjee is one of the Associate Designer Members of Fashion Design Council of India and the youngest board member of the National Museum of Indian Cinema. He has designed costumes for Bollywood films such as Guzaarish, Baabul, Laaga Chunari Mein Daag, Raavan, and English Vinglish.

== Biography ==
=== Early life ===
Sabyasachi comes from a middle-class Bengali family. Sabyasachi is originally from Kankinara, West Bengal. His early education was from Sri Aurobindo Vidyamandir, Chandannagar.

=== Career ===
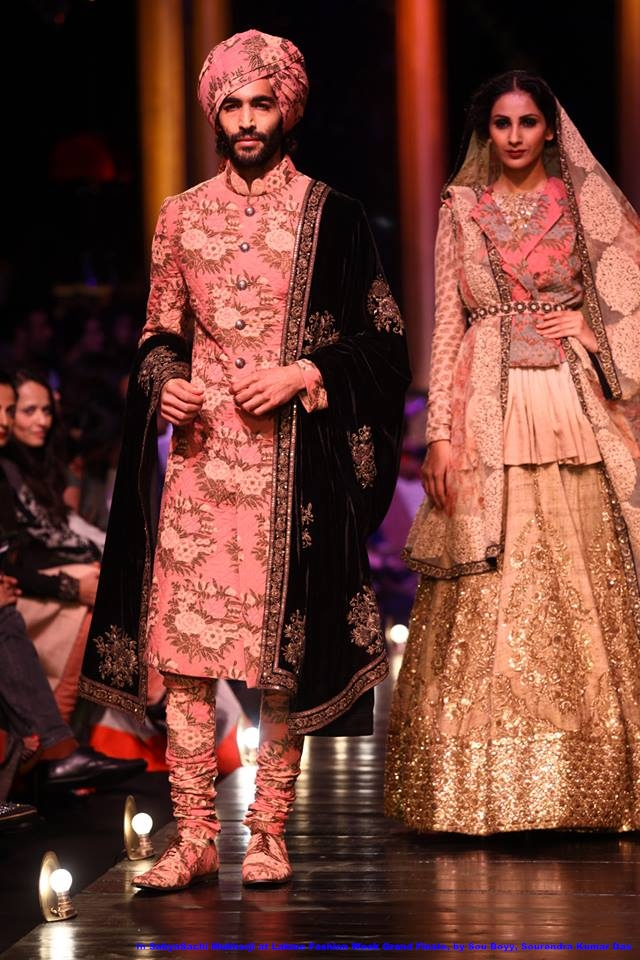
Models walking for SabyaSachi Couture

During the summer of 1999, Sabyasachi Mukherjee graduated from the National Institute of Fashion Technology. Four months later, he started his eponymous brand which began with a workforce of three people. In 2001, he won the Femina British Council's Most Outstanding Young Designer of India Award, which took him to London for an internship with Georgina von Etzdorf, an eclectic designer based in Salisbury. Returning home with ideas, Sabyasachi started retailing at all major stores in India.

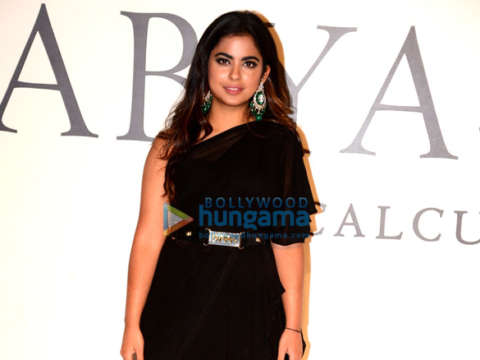
Isha Ambani Piramal, director of Reliance Jio and daughter of Mukesh Ambani in a SabyaSachi black sari at Sabyasachi's bash

In 2002, Sabyasachi Mukerjee participated at India Fashion Week, received positive feedback from the press. During the spring of 2003, he made his first international runway, with the "Grand Winner Award" at the Mercedes-Benz New Asia Fashion week in Singapore, which paved his way to a workshop in Paris by Jean Paul Gaultier and Azzedine Alaia. In his collection "Kora" at the Lakme Fashion Week 2003, he used unbleached and hand woven fabrics with Kantha and other hand embroideries.

In 2004, Sabyasachi presented his collection "The Frog Princess" at Kuala Lumpur Fashion Week and Miami Fashion Week. His showing in Browns earned him a retail place at a tiny London store voted by Vogue as the best shopping destination in the world.

In 2005, Sabyasachi presented the spring-summer collection "The Nair Sisters", inspired by hand block printing, embroideries, Bagru prints, and the extensive use of cotton and other hand woven fabrics. The collection was sold at Browns and Selfridges in London. He was requested to showcase his collections at the Oxford University annual black tie charity dinner fashion show.

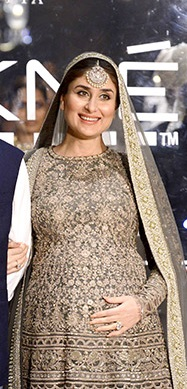
Indian actress Kareena Kapoor Khan in SabyaSachi at the finale of Lakme Fashion Week 2016

In 2006, Sabyasachi's debut Spring Summer collection’07 at New York Fashion Week earned him critical acclaim and his label started selling worldwide. The essence of this collection was based on folklore, glamour, simplicity, modern architecture, and intricate detailing. There was a marked influence on paintings from the seventeenth and eighteenth centuries like Brueghel, Claude Monet, and others. He used dark jewelled colours with muted shades accentuated with subtle texturing and indigenous embroidery. He is the only Indian designer to be a part of all three leading fashion weeks: New York, Milan and London. Sabyasachi believes that the unique positioning of Indian designers is due to his homeland's rich history and culture. He believes that Indian designers bring a flavour to the west that is no longer perceived as only exotic, but also a rich blend of individuality and sensitivity.

In 2007, Sabyasachi participated at the New York Fashion Week and at the London Fashion Weeks plus Bridal Asia 2007, Lakme Fashion Week and the Vogue launch event in India. His "Sanctuary" collection showcased at Lakme Fashion Week Fall Winter 08 received positive reviews from the fashion editor of the New York Times, Suzy Menkes.

Sabyasachi closed the third edition of PCJ Delhi Couture Week (8–12 August 2012) with his "New Moon" collection, inspired by the flavours of five cities: the world-straitjacket discipline of New York, the nostalgia of the British Raj in Kolkata, the subversive decadence of Berlin, the romanticism of Paris, and bohemian flair of Barcelona. Bollywood star Sridevi was the showstopper and walked the ramp for the designer in a sari. Sabyasachi showcased this collection in UAE as well. Sabyasachi launched in 2008 a line of jewellery exclusively designed by himself, in association with the GAJA brand. The collection was showcased at the Vogue Wedding Show in 2016. He launched his exclusive menswear collection featuring sherwanis, kurtas, and headgear at the Lakme Fashion Week Spring Summer 09 Grand Finale show. He also started a kids wear line under the label Chota Sabhya.

In 2012, Sabyasachi styled a calendar for which Bollywood actress Neha Dhupia dressed up as famous painter Frida Kahlo, who has been Sabyasachi's inspiration for the Grand Finale at WIFW Autumn-Winter 2011. The models walked the ramp wearing Frida Kahlo-esque rose headbands and wire-rimmed glasses.

Sabyasachi Mukherjee's Autumn Winter 2015 collection at Amazon India Couture Week (AICW) was a collaboration with French luxury footwear and fashion designer Christian Louboutin. 80 pairs of shoes, both for men and women, all embroidered with Sabyasachi's embroidery and embellished with hand-placed sequins, were created for the show. Louboutin also modified his signature Victoria heel for the collection, to be embroidered with Sabyasachi's embroidery using acid-dyed burnt zardozi and vintage Parsi gara. Sabyasachi has exclusively collaborated with Bergdorf Goodman for handcrafted pieces of fine and bohemian jewellery during January to March 2020. His estate in Alipore Calcutta was partly inspired from works of Bijoy Jain and Pierre Cardin.

In 2025, Sabyasachi designed the wardrobe of Bollywood megastar Shah Rukh Khan at the Met Gala in Manhattan. The outfit won rave reviews from fans for modelling a king-like outfit, including a sceptre crowned by an emblematic tiger's head, custom jewellery displaying "SRK", and a larger pendulum displaying "K", all of which, as Sabyasachi explained, were intended to empower Shah Rukh Khan to express himself personally and powerfully. Sabyasachi himself walked the Met Gala carpet during the ceremony.

== Design philosophy ==
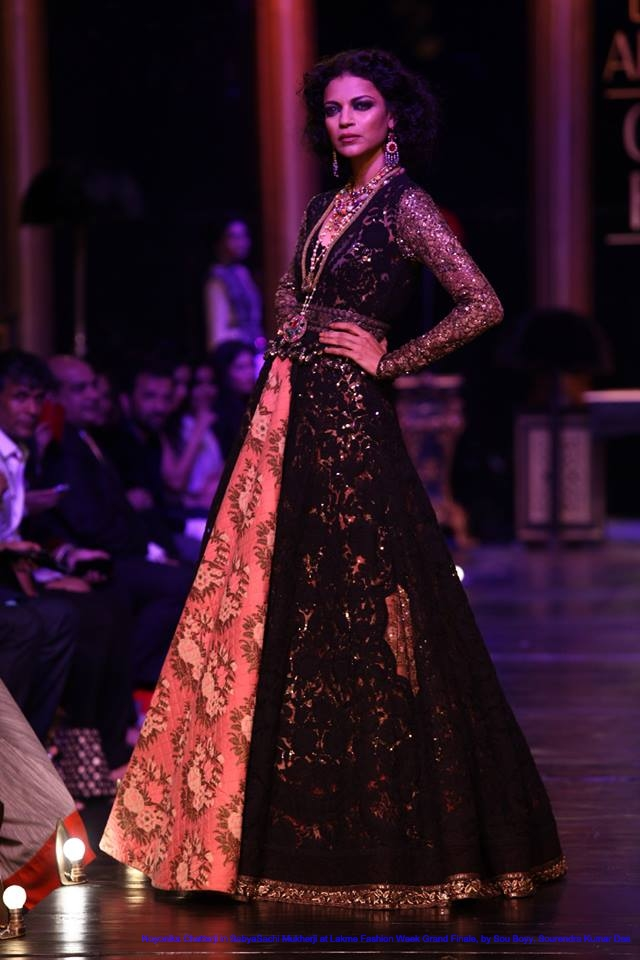
Noyonika Chatterji walking in SabyaSachi Couture

Sabyasachi's design philosophy is "personalised imperfection of the human hand". Deserts, gypsies, prostitutes, antique textiles and cultural traditions of his home town, Kolkata, have been a lifelong inspiration; Sabyasachi believes that "clothes should just be an extension of one's intellect". He uses unusual fabrics, texturing and detailing, fusion of styles, patch-work with embellishments in vibrant colours. His creations evoke images of ancient and medieval ages. He describes his own collections as "an International styling with an Indian soul".

He designs crafted bridal wear and rigorously structured pieces. On occasion, Sabyasachi draws inspirations from the wider world, such as the colourscapes of French impressionists Claude Monet and Henry Matisse in his clothes.

He uses classical Indian textile methods like bandhani, gota work, block printing, hand dyeing in construction of modern silhouettes.

== Revival initiatives ==
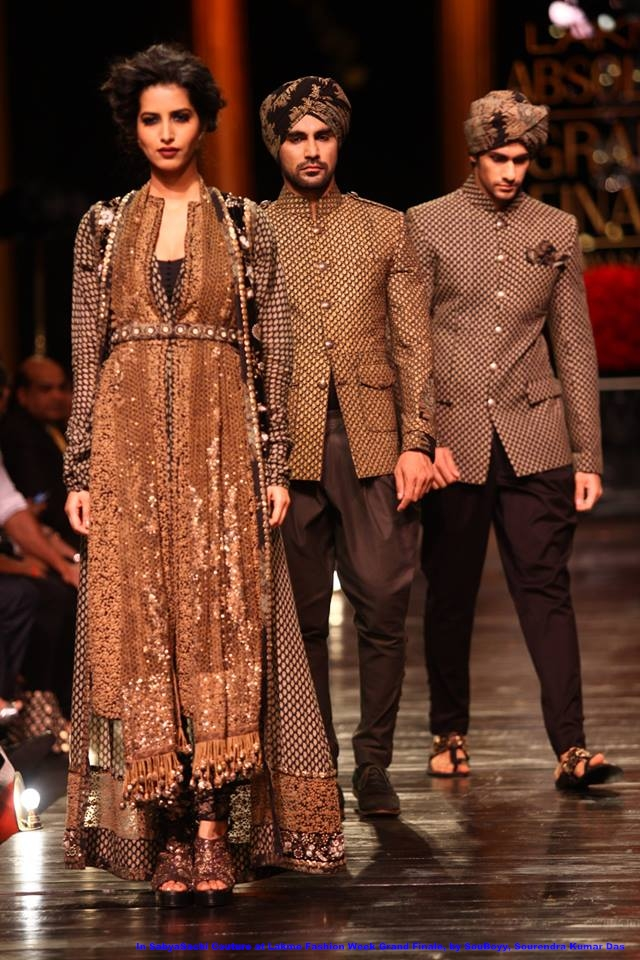
SabyaSachi Mukherji's show at Lakme Fashion Week

Mukherjee started a project called Save the Saree where he retails hand-woven Indian saris on a non-profit basis priced at ₹3,500 (US$36), where the entire proceed goes to the weavers of Murshidabad. This initiative is also strongly supported by Film industry divas like Aishwarya Rai Bachchan, Vidya Balan. He has been developing textiles from Dastkarin-Andhra Pradesh, Berozghar Mahili Samitiin-Bihar, Tantubay Samiti-Fulia and Kotpadin-Orissa. Sabyasachi uses rich Indian fabrics in his collection – extensive use of Banarasi fabric can be seen in his range. Over the past two years he has also been involved in reviving cotton Benarasi saris in pure khadi and vegetable hand block prints from Bagru, bringing them to the international platform.

Sotheby's London hosted an exhibition of contemporary design named 'Inspired by India' where Sabyasachi showcased his work of khadi. Sabyasachi's collection of Winter-Festive Lakme Fashion Week 2011 revived the finer version of khadi.

== Sabyasachi and Bollywood ==
Sabyasachi forayed into films by designing costumes for Sanjay Leela Bhansali's landmark film Black, which earned him critical acclaim along with the National Award in 2005 for the best costume designer for a feature film. Since then, he has designed for other Bollywood movies such as Baabul, Laaga Chunari Mein Daag, Raavan, Guzaarish, Paa, No One Killed Jessica and English Vinglish.

In 2012, Sabyasachi appeared on NDTV Goodtimes' show Band Baja Bride.

The entire trousseau collection of around 18 hand-crafted saris for Bollywood diva Vidya Balan's wedding was designed by Sabyasachi for which he specially sourced the silk from Chennai. Vidya Balan also wore seven of his outfits for her public appearances whilst serving on the competition jury panel at Cannes 2013.

One of Sabyasachi's most sold bridal pieces was named after Bipasha Basu as the 'Bipasha Blouse'. Originally created for Basu during the filming of Raavan, the piece was then put up for sale.

Anushka Sharma wore a pale pink lehenga and Virat Kohli wore an ivory raw silk sherwani designed by Sabyasachi at their wedding on 11 December 2017.

Deepika Padukone wore a red lehenga and Ranveer Singh wore a red raw silk sherwani designed by Sabyasachi at their high-profile wedding on 14 November 2018.

For their second wedding, both Nick Jonas and Priyanka Chopra wore custom looks by Sabyasachi. Chopra wore a crimson red lehenga made out of hand-cut organza flowers, French knots in silk floss, and Siam-red crystals. The outfit took 110 embroiderers in Calcutta and 3,720 hours.

Sabyasachi's celebrity clientele also includes Samantha Akkineni, Rani Mukerji, Sridevi, Katrina Kaif, Tabu, Shabana Azmi, Aishwarya Rai Bachchan, Anushka Sharma, Deepika Padukone, Priyanka Chopra, Shraddha Kapoor, Sushmita Sen, Radhika Pandit, Nita Dalal Ambani, Isha Ambani Piramal, Shloka Mehta Ambani, Radhika Merchant (members of Mukesh Ambani's family), and Kareena Kapoor Khan, among several others.

Internationally, actresses Renée Zellweger and Reese Witherspoon, among others, have sported Sabyasachi's label.

In 2024, Alia Bhatt donned a creative ensemble designed by Sabyasachi, making him the first Indian designer to walk the Met Gala red carpet in New York.

In 2025, Shah Rukh Khan donned a King-like costume designed by Sabyasachi, making Shah Rukh Khan the first Indian male actor to walk the Met Gala red carpet.

== Store locations ==
The brand has flagship store locations in Kolkata, New Delhi, Mumbai, Hyderabad, Bangalore, and New York City. Limited pieces are also carried by other retailers in various parts of India, as well as select international retailers in California, Atlanta, London and Dubai.

== Awards and distinctions ==
- Best Designer of Hindustan at the MTV Lycra style awards.
- Society Achievers award for the best new Indian designer.
- He is the only Indian designer to be requested to showcase at Italy's indigenous fashion showcase Milan Fashion Week 2004.
- Voted by Asia Inc. (a Singapore-based business magazine) as one of the ten most influential Indians in Asia.
