= Dabu printing =

Indian hand-block resist printing method

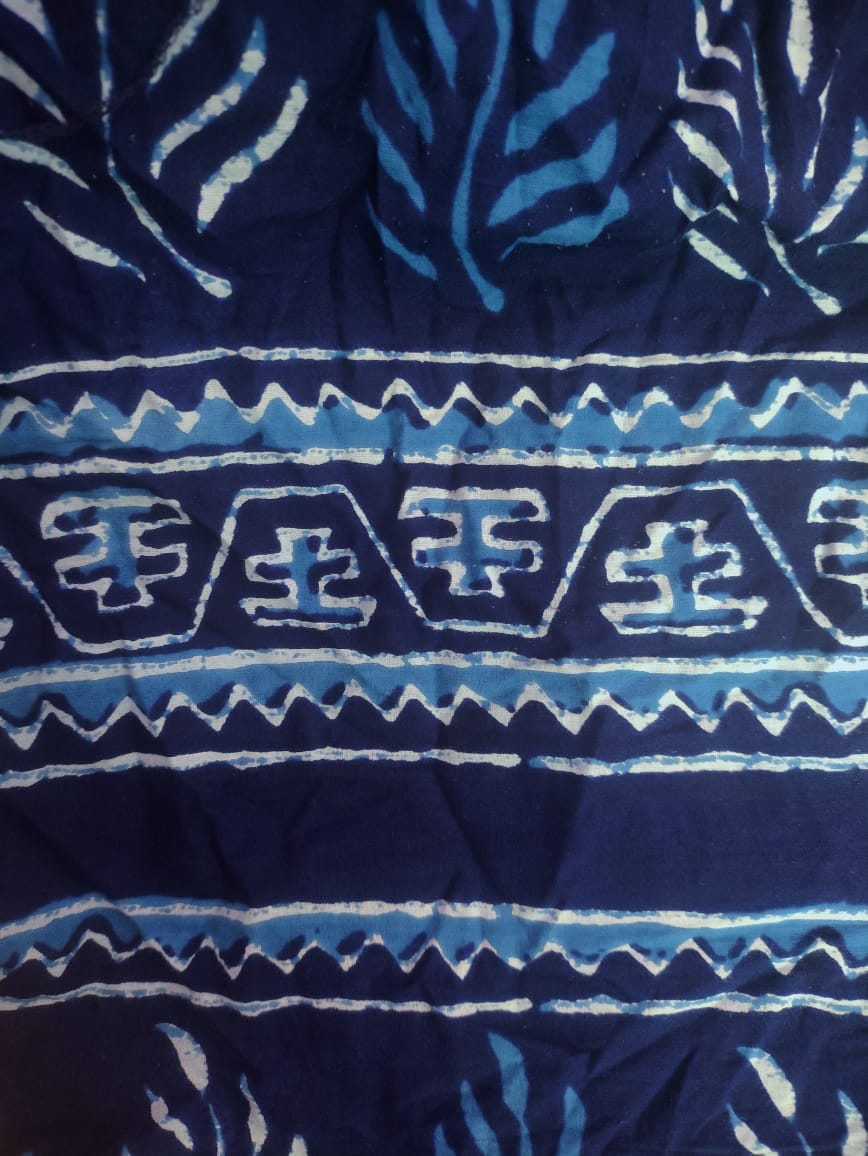
Dabu Printed Fabric

Dabu printing is a centuries-old Indian hand-block resist printing method based on the ancient rural textile craft of Rajasthan. It is done with natural substances—black clay, lime, wheat chaff, gum, and sawdust—to form the resist patterns and natural or vegetable dyes for dyeing the resist patterns, most often indigo. The method produces materials with complex designs and deep rich colors, typically enriched with successive layers of resist and dye deposits to create dramatic visual effects.

Dabu holds both aesthetic and cultural significance and is known for using natural dyes and handcrafted methods that reflect regional heritage. The process is a sequence of manual processes, from block carving and paste making to printing and dyeing, all of which are an expression of deep integration of technical expertise and cultural symbolism. Practised by the Chhipa community, the tradition has survived economic change, environmental pressures, and shifting market forces.

In the past several decades, there has been renewed interest in Dabu as a result of the slow fashion trend, awareness of sustainable textile issues, and worldwide appreciation of handmade products. Presently, fabrics printed with Dabu are utilized on garments, furnishings for the home, accessories, and design collaborations worldwide.

== History ==
The origin of the word "Dabu" is traced to the Hindi word "dabana," which means "to press." Local folklores have it that the method might have been accidentally discovered when mud-stained fabric resisted indigo dye when washed, leaving white motifs untouched. This is said to have initiated the resist-printing tradition in India. Though Rajasthan is currently the leading center for Dabu, some historians place similar practices in ancient China and other Asian regions.

India has a rich and historic tradition of cloth making and dyeing methods. Archaeological remains at places such as Mohenjo-Daro (around 2000 BCE) suggest that cotton clothes were already being colored and printed in the Indian subcontinent. In the Roman Empire, Indian fabrics, particularly cotton, were in great demand in the Mediterranean and Middle Eastern world. Significantly, pieces of cloth excavated in Fustat, just outside Cairo, and at Quseir al-Qadim in Egypt in the 1980s indicate the presence of 14th-century resist-dyed cloth thought to be from western India. These works show rich indigo colors and motif designs similar to those employed in Dabu printing, emphasizing the age and global popularity of this art.

In India, the village of Akola in Chittorgarh district is considered to be a center of origin for Dabu printing. In contrast to other Rajasthani prints like Bagru and Sanganeri, Dabu is different because it uses a mud-resist technique that gives a delicate texture and veined appearance to the printed designs. The designs have some visual resemblance to batik, but the process is entirely different: Dabu employs mud resist, whereas batik utilises wax.

During medieval and Mughal times, Dabu fabrics were supported by local aristocracy and worn on festivals and rituals. In the 20th century, however, Dabu printing declined with the advent of synthetic dyes, mechanised printing, and industrial production. The artisans suffered economic loss, and younger generations started abandoning the trade.

The revival process took off in the late 1990s and early 2000s by way of designer collaborations, grassroots NGOs, and government initiatives. Groups and brands such as Aavaran, Gaatha, etc. have been working on training artisans, documenting skills, and infusing Dabu into global fashion and global markets. The renewed interest in ethical fashion and green textiles has brought Dabu printing into the forefront once again, now not only valued as an art form, but as a badge of cultural endurance and sustainability.

== Technique ==
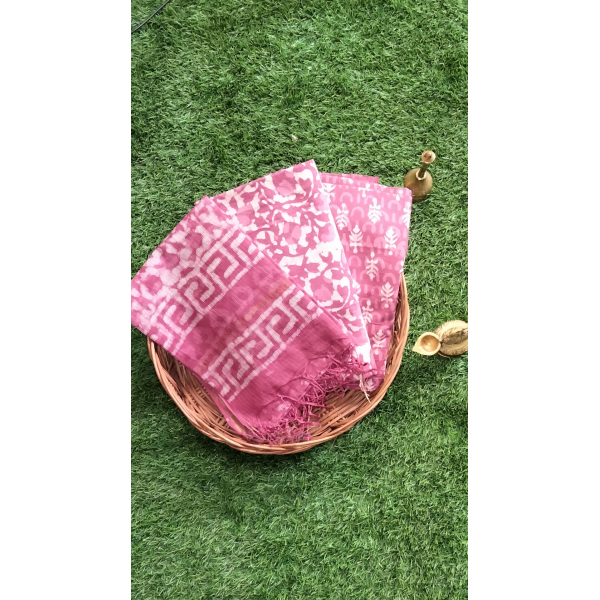
Dabu Print

=== Materials ===
Dabu printing employs eco-friendly and regionally available materials:

- Fabrics: Cotton, khadi, silk, crepe, georgette, and wool.
- Mud resist paste: A blend of black clay (kali mitti), lime (chuna), wheat chaff, and gum.
- Dyes: Natural dyes such as indigo, alizarin, turmeric, pomegranate rind, iron (ferrous sulphate), and Kesula flowers.
- Mordants: Harda (myrobalan), alum, and iron filings.
- Tools: Wooden printing blocks, printing tables (pathiya), indigo vats, sawdust, and earthen pots.

== Process ==
The process involves several precise, sequential steps:

1. Scouring: Raw grey fabric is soaked in a mixture of cow/sheep dung and water for 24 hours to remove starch, oils, and dirt. It is then rinsed and sun-dried.
2. Tannin Treatment: The fabric is treated with myrobalan to improve absorbency. This treatment turns the fabric yellowish and prepares it for mordanting.
3. Mud Resist Printing: Using hand-carved wooden blocks, artisans apply the Dabu paste to specific areas. Sawdust is sprinkled on the wet paste to set it and prevent smudging.
4. Dyeing: The fabric is dipped into a vat of natural dye, often indigo. After oxidation in open air, the fabric may be redipped multiple times for deeper shades.
5. Washing: The dried paste is washed off by soaking the fabric in water for several hours and beating it against stones to remove excess dye and mud.
6. Fixing Colors: Mordants such as alum or iron react with dyes to create specific colors (e.g., red from alizarin and alum, black from iron and harda).

This process may be repeated for layered effects, creating patterns with two or three colors—a practice known as "double Dabu" or "triple Dabu."

== Motifs and patterns ==
Dabu motifs are deeply inspired by nature and rural life, reflecting the regional culture and aesthetics. Traditional patterns include:

- Animal motifs - Peacocks , Elephants etc
- Floral motifs - Sunflowers ,mangoes etc.
- Geometric designs - Zigzags, dots, waves, lines, and concentric patterns.

The designs thus created are repeated over and over again all over the fabric. Sometimes, the mud paste cracks and leaks, creating a distinctive vein like effect similar to Batik.

These motifs are hand-carved into wooden blocks, often made from sheesham or teak, and sourced from Jaipur and nearby craft centers. Modern motifs now also include coconut trees, banyan leaves, abstract forms, etc.

== Geographical significance ==
Dabu printing flourishes largely in the Indian state of Rajasthan, where ancient customs are carefully conserved and practiced by community artisans. The process has firmly established itself in rural areas like Akola in Chittorgarh district, Bagru and Sanganer near Jaipur, and Pipar City in the Jodhpur district. All these places bring a local flavor to the art that is influenced by the local resources, beauty, and the community's way of life.

At Akola, the Dabu print is deeply rooted in custom, where skills have been transferred from generation to generation, maintained within closely clustered craft guilds. Here the designs tend to be earthy, strong, and rough-edged—resonating the semi-arid environment and agriculturally inclined genesis of the location.

Bagru, which is nearer to Jaipur, is famous for its finer Dabu motifs, frequently described as being intricate in pattern and naturally subtle in color usage. Being near urban markets has facilitated the Bagru artisans to give new-age touches to their designs while continuing to apply traditional mud-resist techniques, thus combining heritage with innovation in a vibrant synthesis.

Sanganer, although known for subtle yet elegant floral block prints, has also found Dabu crossover into its techniques. Here, artisans are experimenting with fusion styles, bringing Dabu into new product categories like home furnishings and urban apparel.

Pipar City, in the midst of Rajasthan, is also crucial to the tradition. It specialises in dense Dabu prints and labor-intensive vat dyeing. The artisans here get the finest black clay for the mud resist from riverbeds and lake basins, traveling long distances because of environmental degradation and water shortages.

== Sustainability ==
Dabu printing showcases principles of eco-design and sustainable practices:

Natural ingredients: Black clay, gum, lime, and sawdust are locally available.

Low energy usage: Sun drying and hand block printing minimise carbon emissions.

Water conservation: Less water compared to industrial dyeing.

Natural dyes: Minimised chemical runoff and promote eco-fashion.

Reusable dye vats: Particularly with indigo, vats are kept for extended periods with little waste.

Although, the process is challenged by environmental conditions in places such as Pipar City where groundwater contamination due to increasing BOD content and pH swings renders the water and mud undesirable for printing. The craftsmen have to seek 15–20 km insearch of clean material, resulting in additional time and cost to production.

== Design and innovation ==
Dabu printing has seen a design-led resurgence through collaborations with contemporary textile designers. Studios such as D'Art Studio (founded by Manisha Monga) and Aavaran (founded by Alka Sharma) have reinvented the technique for modern audiences. These designers have blended traditional methods with:

- Unconventional color palettes
- Geometric and abstract motifs
- Contemporary silhouettes in Indo-western fashion

Designers also play a vital role in bridging artisans with urban and international markets, ensuring fair compensation and preserving the authenticity of the craft.

== Global reach ==
In recent years, Dabu printing has grown in popularity beyond India, aligned with trends in sustainable and slow fashion. Its popularity is driven by:

- Timeless appeal of indigo
- Handcrafted, one-of-a-kind designs
- Compatibility with both ethnic and modern clothing

Export data from the Ministry of Commerce and Industry (2018) indicates a nearly 27% increase in natural dye exports, including indigo, which supports the growing demand for eco-conscious textiles.

== Preservation and promotion ==
Efforts towards maintaining Dabu printing combine training, infrastructural development, digital integration, and policy support. Different NGOs, craft groups, and governmental agencies have supported the conservation of this heritage craft.

Skill Training and Documentation: Training programs and workshopsorganized by organizations such as Aavaran and Dastkar seek to document traditional skills and involve the younger generation of artisans. The process ensures that knowledge is transmitted within artisanal communities.

Environmental and Infrastructure Support: Clean water access is becoming an issue, especially in areas such as Pipar City where contamination of groundwater compromises the mud and dye quality. Certain projects have provided water treatment equipment and rainwater harvesting to ensure sustainable production.

Digital Platforms and Market Access: Online platforms like Amazon Karigar, and GoCoop enable artisans to access larger markets, minimize intermediaries' reliance, and gain exposure. Certain artisan groups are directly employing social media and e-commerce platforms.

Government and Policy Assistance: Initiatives of the Ministry of Textiles such as the National Handicrafts Development Programme (NHDP) offer design, technology, marketing, and capacity-building assistance. Craft innovation is also facilitated by Design Resource Centers (DRCs).

All these initiatives try to safeguard the cultural purity of Dabu printing while making it ready for modern economic and ecological realities.

== See also ==
- Bagru printing
- Batik
- Kalamkari
- Ajrak
- Block printing
- Natural dyes

== Sources ==
1. Joshi, Pradeep. (2024). Proceedings for "International Conference on Innovation in Visual Arts (ICIVA’23)”.
2. Guru, Ramratan & Panigrahi, Satyanarayan. (2023). To study the traditional different printing techniques of India. LI. 204-209.
3. Hada, J.S., Meena, C.R. (2022). Dabu, The Sustainable Resist Printed Fabric of Rajasthan. In: Muthu, S.S. (eds) Sustainable Approaches in Textiles and Fashion. Sustainable Textiles: Production, Processing, Manufacturing & Chemistry. Springer, Singapore.
4. Kaur, Jasminder. "DABU-A Unique style of mud printing." Birbhum, Silpa Sadana, VisvaBharati, 2nd (2011): 157-163.
5. “Dabu” the resist print of Bagru. 2013, www.indianjournals.com/ijor.aspx?target=ijor:zijmr&volume=3&issue=5&article=009.
6. Hada, Janmay & Meena, Drchet. (2024). Creative design for sustainability: The case study of Dabu printing fabrics of Rajasthan.
7. Gupta, Toolika, Bhargav Mistry, and Barun Shankar Gupta. "A treatise on recent trends and sustainability in crafts & design." Published by: excel India publishers, New Delhi (2017).
8. Dhamija, J. (1979). "The Indian Crafts Revival"
9. Hada, J. (2015). "Natural Dyeing in Pipad Village, Rajasthan"
10. Vankar, P. (2000). "Chemistry of Natural Dyes"
11. Sethi, R. (2005). "Crafts in Contemporary Design Practice"
12. Liebl, M. & Roy, T. "Handmade in India: Traditional Craft Skills in a Changing World"
13. https://theprintroots.com/blogs/news/motifs-of-dabu-print-from-the-ensemble-of-the-printroots
14. https://www.utsavpedia.com/motifs-embroideries/daboo-print/
15. https://thedesigncart.com/blogs/news/dabu-print
16. https://gaatha.com/dabu-print-akola/
