= Block printing in India =

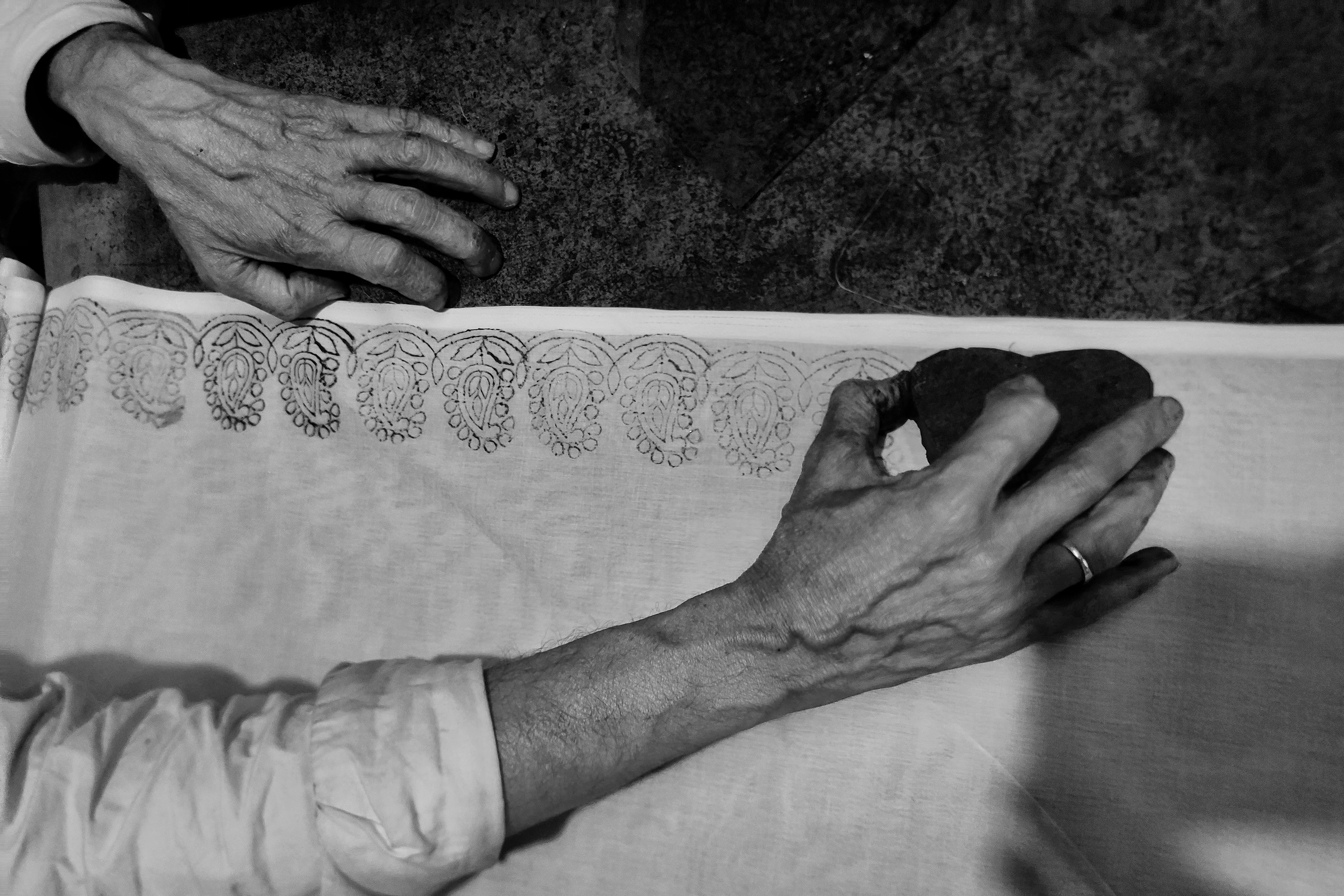
Method of block printing Chikankari in Lucknow (India)

Block printing in India is the traditional use of woodblock fabric printing in India. It is a traditional art and has a number of local variations. It consists of stamping colored designs on fabric using specially carved wooden blocks.

== History ==
Fabric printing is likely to have originated in China around 2500 BC.
