= Ram Kishore Chhipa =

Indian textile artisan

- Born: 20 July 1957; Bagru, Jaipur, Rajasthan, India
- Other name: Ramkishore Derawala
- Occupations: Textile artisan, Dabu printing specialist
- Awards: Padma Shri (2009); National Award (1987); Kala Shri Award (1991)

Ram Kishore Chhipa (born 20 July 1957) is an Indian textile artisan specializing in the traditional Dabu hand block printing technique from Bagru, Jaipur, Rajasthan. He is a Padma Shri awardee for his contributions to preserving and promoting this art form.

== Awards and recognition ==
- Padma Shri (2009) for his contributions to art."Padma Awards 2009" (PDF).
- National Award (1987) from the Office of the Development Commissioner (Handicrafts)."Press Information Bureau Release".
- Kala Shri Award (1991) from the Haryana Government
