= National Museum of Indian Cinema =

Indian museum in Mumbai, dedicated to cinema

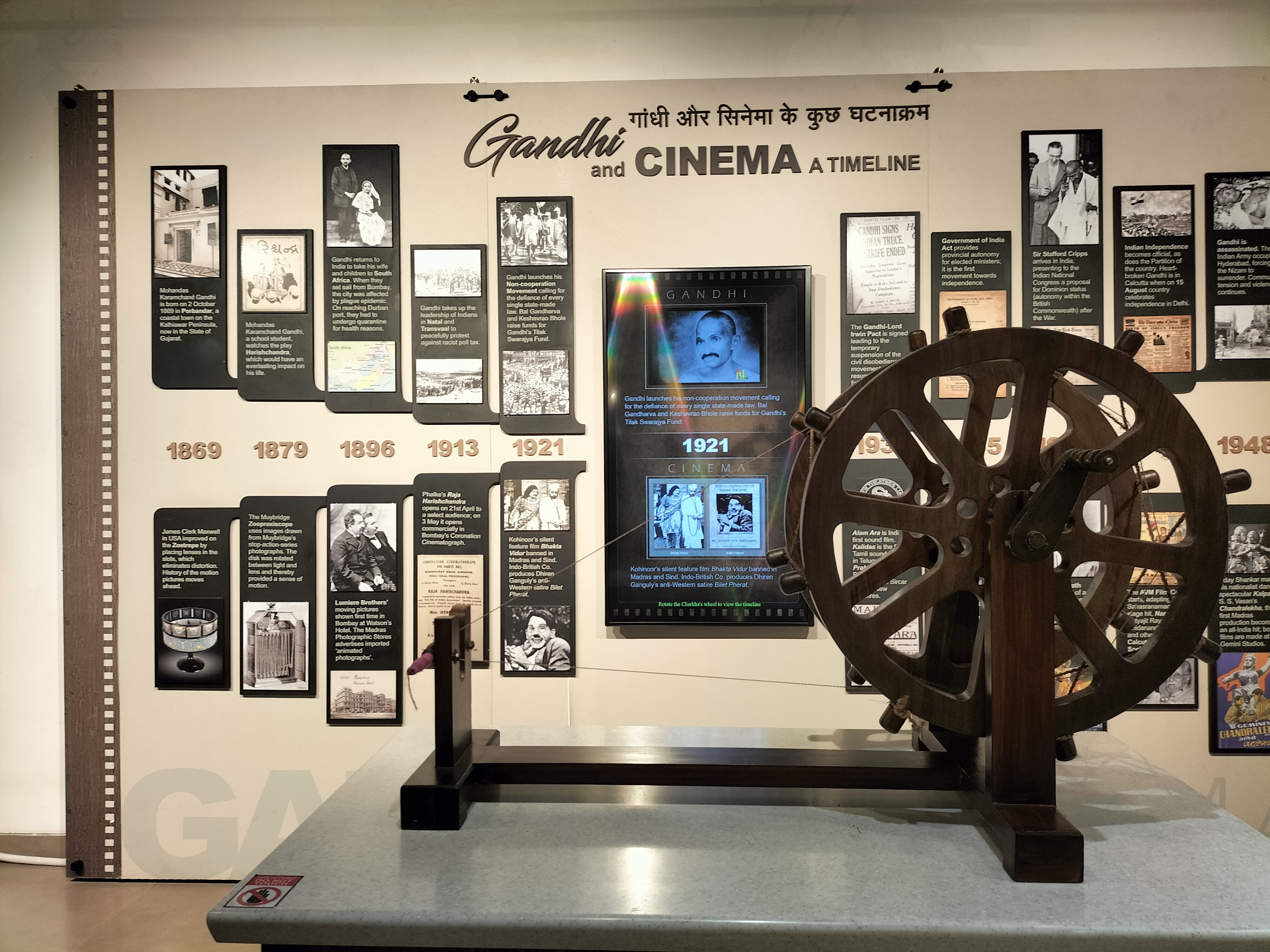
- "Gandhi and cinema" exhibit at the National Museum of Indian Cinema

- Location in Mumbai, Maharashtra
- Established: 19 January 2019
- Location: 2nd Floor, Phase 1, Films Division Complex, Pedder Road, Mumbai, Maharashtra 400026
- Coordinates: 18.9279°N 72.8284°E
- Type: Film museum
- Collection size: Artifacts, equipment, and memorabilia related to Indian cinema
- Founder: Government of India
- Website: National Museum of Indian Cinema

The National Museum of Indian Cinema (NMIC) is a museum located in Mumbai, Maharashtra, dedicated to the history and development of Indian cinema.

== History and architecture ==
The museum complex consists of two buildings:

- Gulshan Mahal - A restored 19th century Victorian-Gothic heritage bungalow, which was originally built in 1875.
- Modern Glass Galleries - A contemporary building with state-of-the-art exhibition spaces, designed by architect Raj Rewal.

== Exhibition galleries ==
=== Gulshan Mahal ===
The heritage building chronicles early Indian cinema, featuring:

- The arrival of cinema in India in 1896, with the first film screening by the Lumière brothers.
- India's first feature film, Raja Harishchandra, released in 1913.
- The transition from silent to talkie films in the 1930s.
- The evolution of Indian cinema through the first half of the 20th century, including the rise of Bollywood.

=== Glass Building Galleries ===
The modern structure showcases:

- Regional cinema across India, including films from Tollywood, Mollywood, and Kollywood.
- Technological innovations in filmmaking, including the use of special effects and animation.
- The evolution of contemporary Indian cinema, including the rise of independent films and digital platforms.
- A special gallery dedicated to Satyajit Ray, featuring his Academy Award and contributions to cinema.

== Collection ==
The museum houses an extensive collection, including:

- Vintage cameras, lights, and filmmaking equipment, such as the Arriflex camera used by Satyajit Ray.
- Interactive technology demonstrations, including a virtual reality experience of a film set.
- A timeline displaying landmark films across 100 years of Indian cinema.
- Memorabilia from iconic Bollywood films, including costumes and props.
- Historic artifacts from Mumbai's film industry, including vintage film posters and photographs.

== Visitor experience ==
The museum offers an immersive journey through Indian cinema, using:

- Storytelling presentations, including audio guides and interactive displays.
- Interactive galleries, including a gallery on film editing and sound design.
- Multimedia displays, including video installations and virtual reality experiences.
- Musical exhibits, including a gallery on film music and composers.
- Hands-on technology demonstrations, including a workshop on film-making techniques.
