= Bagru =

- Assembly map of Bagru constituency in Rajasthan.

- Location in Rajasthan, India
- Coordinates: 26.82°N 75.55°E
- Country: India
- State: Rajasthan
- District: Jaipur
- Elevation: 341 m (1,119 ft)

Population (2011)
  - Total: 31,229

Languages
  - Official: Dundhari, Hindi
- Time zone: UTC+5:30 (IST)
- Postal code: 303007
- Telephone code: +91-141 / 0141
- ISO 3166 code: IN-RJ

Bagru is a town and a municipality in Jaipur district (Tehsil Sanganer) in the state of Rajasthan, India. It is located approximately 32 km southwest of Jaipur, along the Jaipur-Ajmer Road.This is the city of Jugal Darbar. Where every year a huge Lakkhi fair of Jugal Darbar is organized.There is an old school named Government Senior Secondary School (that is now changed to Mahatma Gandhi Government School) established in 1933 and it has Bagru's Oldest Tree (Tamarind Tree) in it planted by its King. Here is a ground known as Baag (Dussehra Ground) (because it was a garden of Bagru's King), where Dasshera mela held every year. There is a lot to see and know here. People are very enthusiastic and helpful. There is a very ancient temple of Jugal Darbar here which is even older than the establishment of Bagru. Apart from this, there are other ancient and worth seeing temples like Pal Wale Balaji Temple, Sawa Ki Bagichi Wale Balaji, Tejaji Temple, Bhomiya Ji Temple etc.Bagru is also a best example of communal harmony where Hindu and Muslim communities have been living and celebrating festivals together for many years. There are also mosques and dargahs here.

== History ==
Bagru was the site of the Battle of Bagru in August 1748, a significant conflict between the forces of Ishwari Singh of Jaipur and Madho Singh I, supported by Maratha and other Rajput allies. This battle had a considerable impact on the political landscape of Rajasthan during that period.

The Thakur of Bagru, one of the foremost nobles of Jaipur, belonged to the Rajawat branch of the Chaturbhujot Rajputs, a branch of the Kachwaha Rajputs.

== Demographics ==
According to the 2011 census of India, Bagru had a population of 31,229. Males constitute 52% of the population, and females 48%. The average literacy rate of Bagru is 71.43%, which is lower than the national average of 74.04%, but higher than the state average of 66.11%. Male literacy is 66%, and female literacy is 34%. Approximately 18% of the population is under 8 years of age.

== Economy ==
Bagru is renowned for its traditional textile printing, particularly natural dyes and hand block printing. The town is home to the Chhipa community, who have practiced this craft for over a century. The Raiger community is also significant to Bagru's economy, specializing in leather processing and manufacturing, including footwear like "mochdi" and "Rajasthani Jutee".

=== Bagru Printing ===
The unique "Bagru prints" are a hallmark of the Chippa community, who have been involved in fabric printing traditions for over 100 years. These prints are made using wooden blocks and natural dyes, creating distinctive floral patterns and earthy tones. Artisans use traditional vegetable dyes, such as indigo for blue, pomegranate and indigo for green, madder root for red, and turmeric for yellow.

=== Dabu Printing (Mud Resist) ===
A significant technique used in Bagru's textile printing is Dabu printing, which involves applying a mud paste (Dabu) to the fabric in specific areas to resist the dye. This process creates unique patterns and textures on the fabric.

=== Jugal Darbar Mela (Lakhi Mela) ===
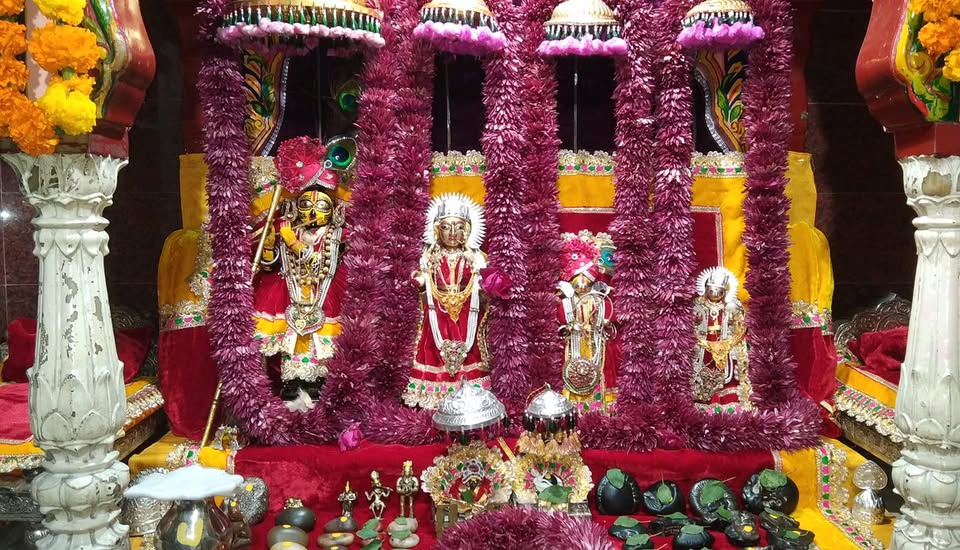
Shree Jugal Darbar Mandir Bagru Jaipur Rajasthan

The Jugal Darbar Mela, also known as the Lakhi Mela, is a significant three-day fair held annually in Bagru, Rajasthan. This fair is dedicated to the deity "Jugal Maharaj" (Lord Vishnu). The mela has a long history, with traditions dating back approximately 400 years. During the mela, "Jugal Maharaj" is taken out in a procession, and the fair features various cultural activities and attractions. The fair is organized starting from the full moon day of the Chaitra month.

== Notable people ==
- Ramzan Khan (Munna Master): A popular bhajan singer from Bagru, known for singing Ram-Krishna bhajans. He received the Padma Shri award for his contributions and his "gau seva" (cow service) work in Bagru.
- Ram Kishore Chhipa: A national award-winning artisan from Bagru, celebrated for his work in the Bagru printing tradition. He received the Padma Shri for his efforts in reviving and promoting traditional Bagru hand block printing.
