= Woodblock printing on textiles =

Process of printing patterns on textiles

A traditional woodblock printer in Bagh, Madhya Pradesh, India.

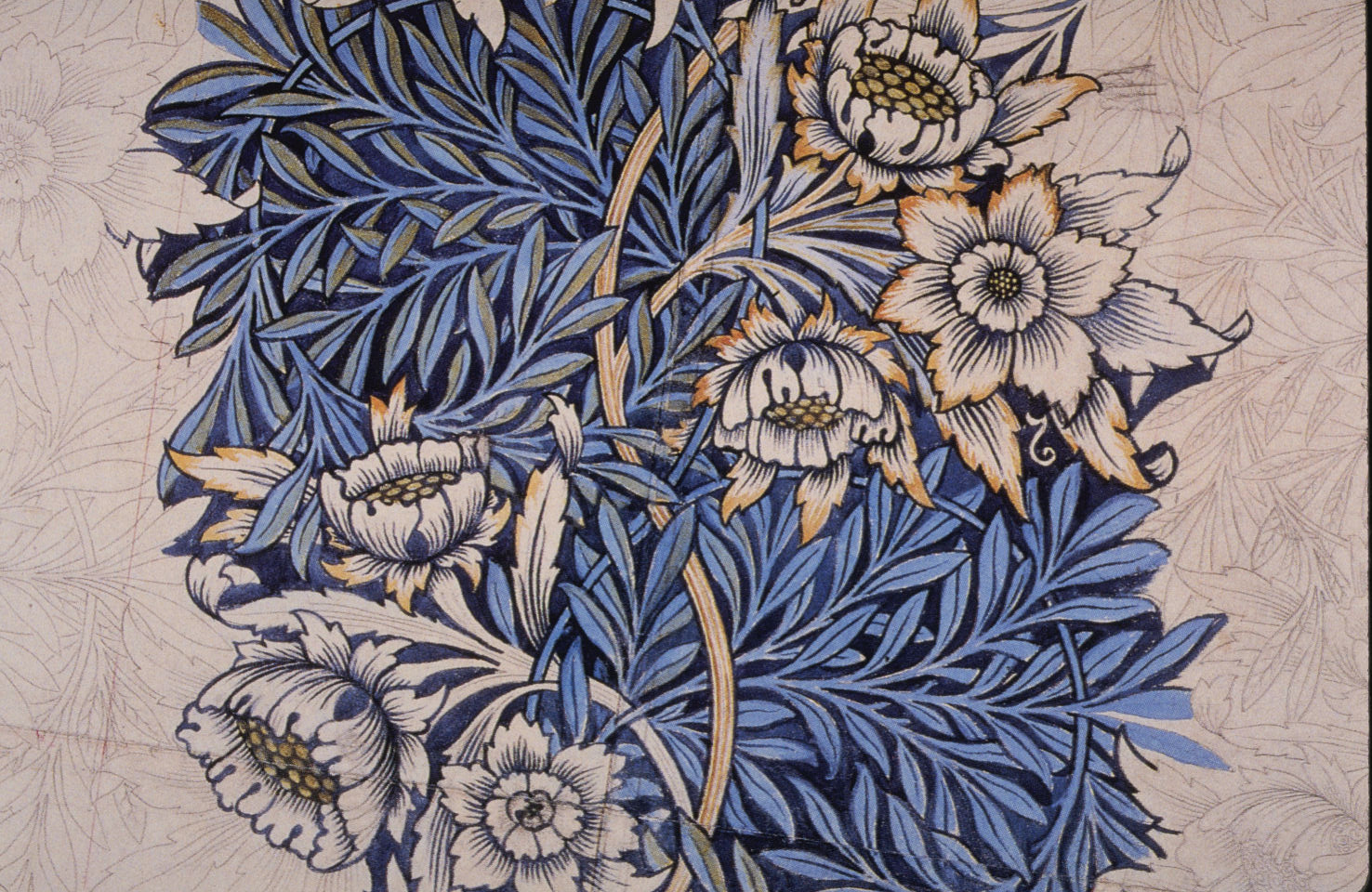
Design for a hand woodblock printed textile, showing the complexity of the blocks used to make repeating patterns in the later 19th century. Tulip and Willow by William Morris, 1873.

Woodblock printing on textiles is the process of printing patterns on fabrics, typically linen, cotton, or silk, by means of carved wooden blocks.

The 'woodblock' is known as chhapa in South Asian countries like India, Burma, Bangladesh, Nepal and Pakistan.

== Communities ==
There are many different communities in various parts of the world associated with the art of woodblock printing. For some, it is considered a traditional occupation.

Communities or classes such as Chhipi, Chhimba, Chhapa, Chhapola in India, craftsmen and merchant classes in China, and Ryōmin (良民) and Senmin (賤民) in Japan are involved in woodblock printing.

== History ==
=== Origins ===
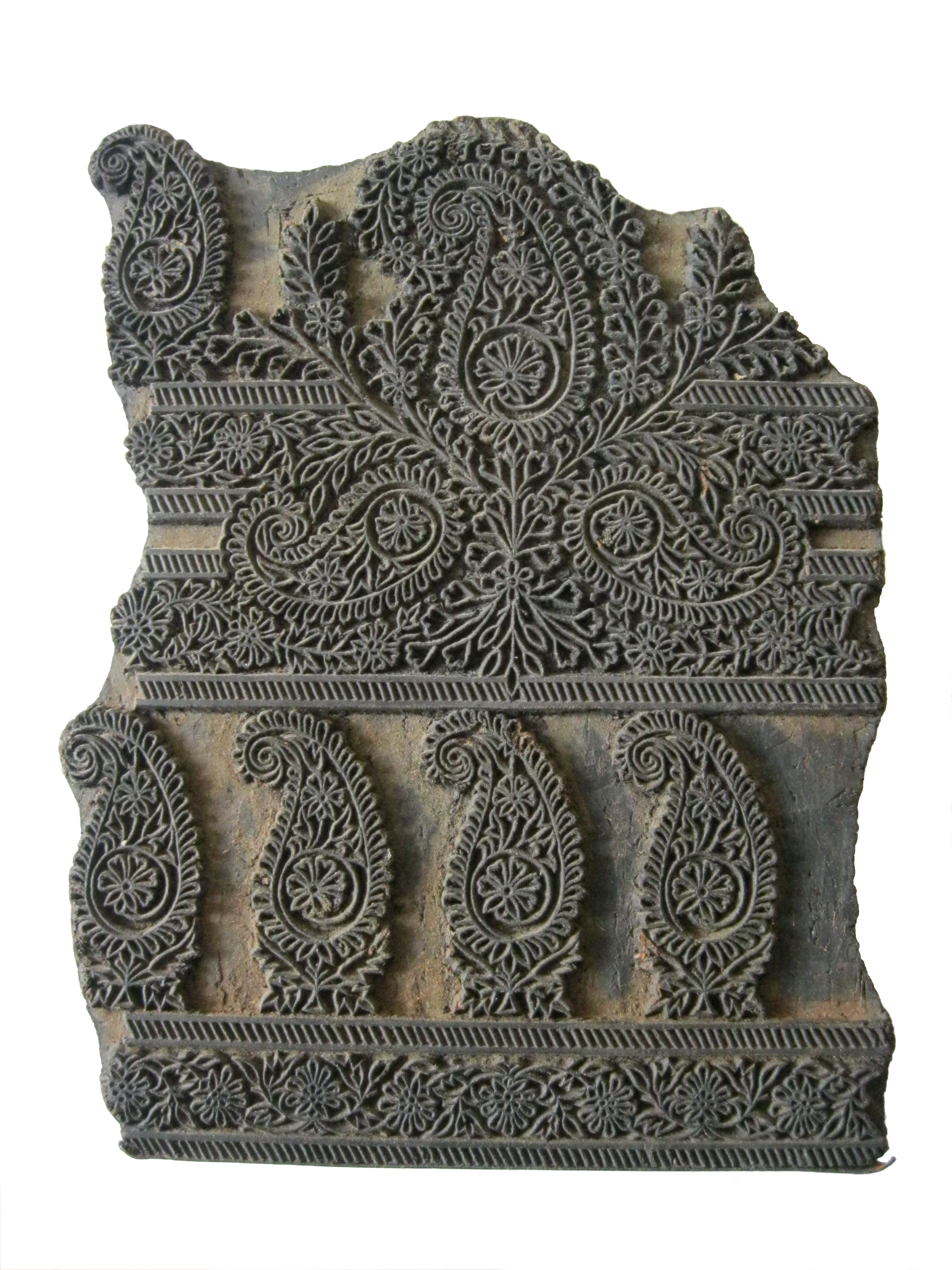
Woodblock, India, about 1900

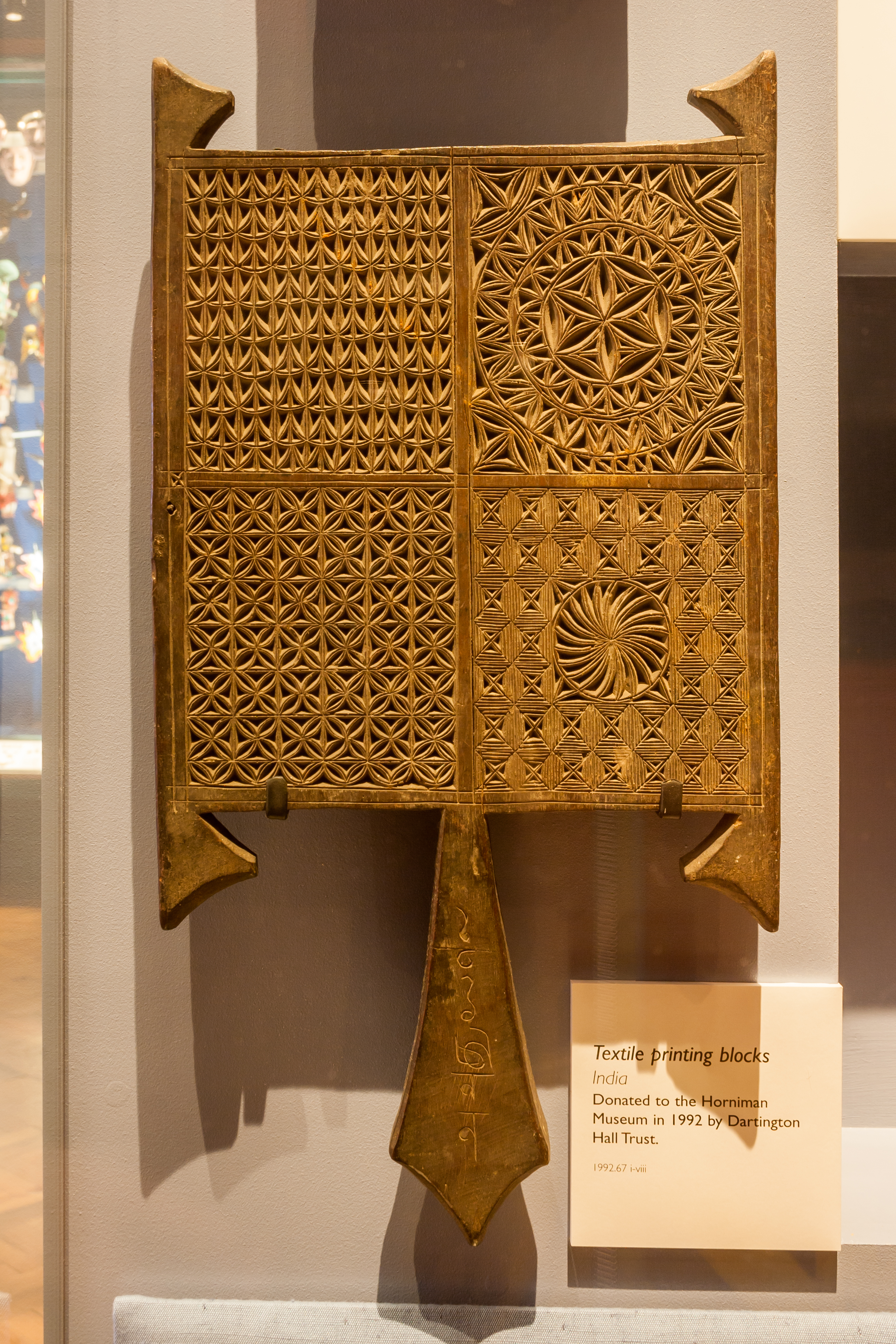
An Indian printing block at the Horniman Museum. Identical for Indian ethnic groups like chhipi, chhimba, chhapola

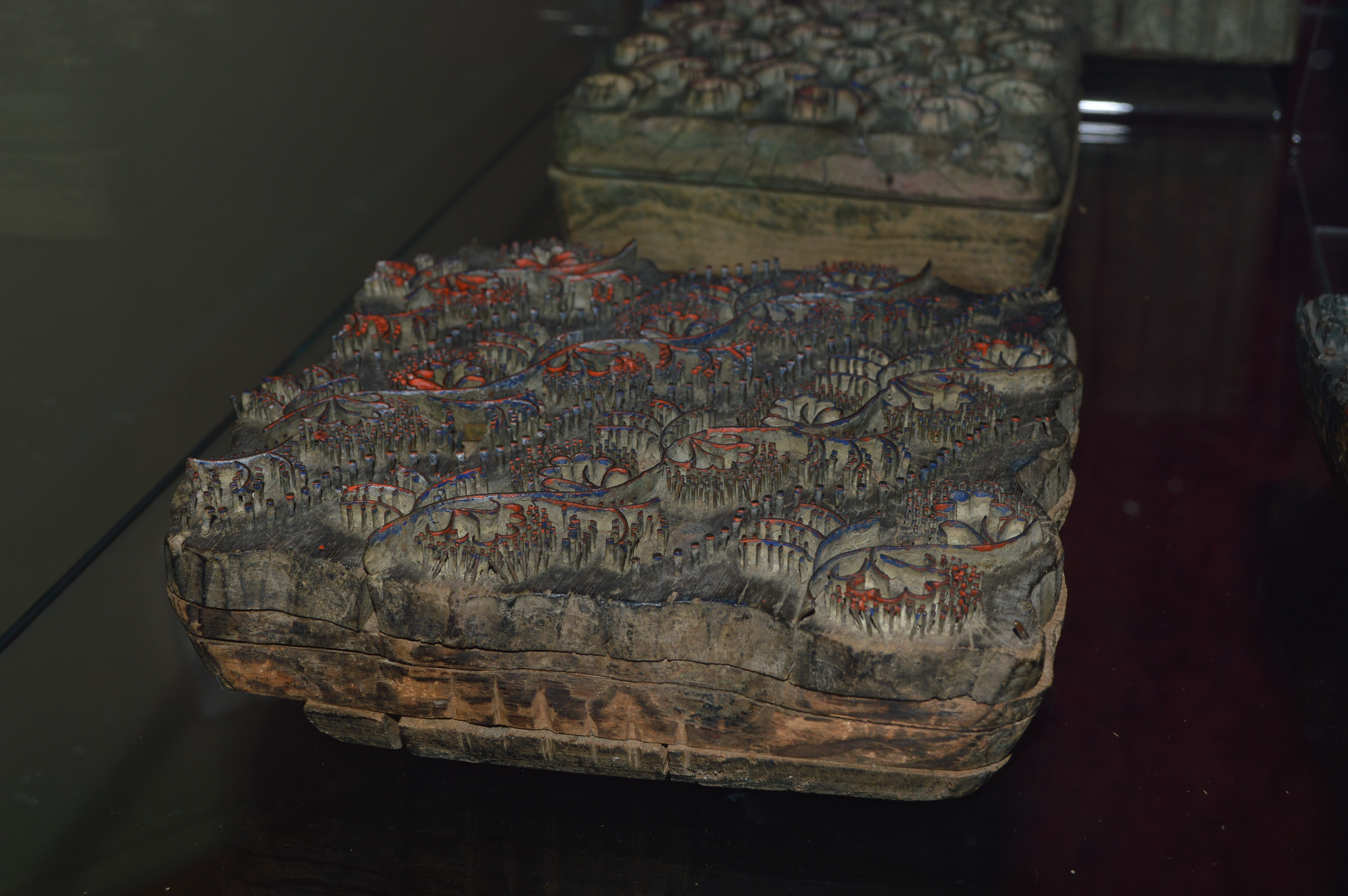
Textile printing blocks, Russian North, 19th century

Printing patterns on textile is closely related to other methods of fabric manipulation, such as by painting, dyeing, and weaving.

Woodblock printing on textiles can be traced back to the ancient use of stone blocks and wood, carved to make impressions on various materials. Ancient civilizations such as those in China, Egypt, and Assyria likely used printing on textiles alongside other materials from a very early period. For example, there is direct evidence that people in South Asia, including some from Punjab and Mumbai, extensively used printing for textile decoration from early on. Beginning in the 16th century, European, particularly Dutch merchants, bought printed and painted calico for trade. Despite the great skill displayed by the Chinese in ornamental weaving and other branches of textile art, there seems to be no direct evidence of their using printing for textile decoration as extensively as in India. In the nineteenth century, woodblock printing in Europe was developed and modified through the use of machinery, stereotypes, and engraved metal plates.

=== Ancient world ===
As in the case with weaving and embroideries, specimens of printed stuffs have of recent years been obtained from disused cemeteries in Upper Egypt (Akhmim and elsewhere) and tell us of Egypto-Roman use of such things. A few of these are now lodged in European museums. For indications that early Egyptians, Greeks and Romans were acquainted with the process, one has to rely upon less evidence. Of textiles painted by Egyptians there are many actual examples. Apart from these there are wall paintings, e.g., those of Beni Hasan (c. 2200–1800 BC), which depict Egyptian people wearing costumes irregularly patterned with spots, stripes and zigzags, which may have been more easily stamped than embroidered or woven. A more complicated and orderly pattern well suited to stamping occurs in a painting about 1320 BC, of Hathor and King Meneptha I. Herodotus also referred to the garments of the inhabitants of the Caucasus, describing representations of various animals.

When Alexander invaded India in 327 BC, there were reportedly block-printed textiles produced there.

Pliny the Elder describes a process employed in Egypt for the coloring of cloth. After pressing the material, which is white at first, they saturate it, not with colors, but with mordants intended to absorb color. He does not explain how this saturation is done. But as it is clearly for the purpose of obtaining a decorative effect, stamping or brushing the mordants into the material may be inferred. When this was finished the cloth was plunged into a cauldron of boiling dye and removed the next moment fully colored. It is a singular fact, too, that although the dye in the pan is of one uniform color, the material when taken out of it is of various colors according to the nature of the mordants that have been respectively applied to it. Egypto-Roman bits of printed textiles from Akhmim exhibit the use, some three hundred years later than the time of Pliny, of boldly cut blocks for stamping figure-subjects and patterns onto textiles. Almost concurrent with their discovery was that of a fragment of printed cotton at Arles in the grave of St Caesarius, who was bishop there about AD 542. Equal in archaeological value are similar fragments found in an ancient tomb at Quedlinburg. These, however, are of comparatively simple patterns.

=== Medieval Europe ===
Museum specimens establish the fact that more important pattern printing on textiles had become a developed industry in parts of Europe towards the end of the 12th and the beginning of the 13th century.

According to Forrer (Die Kunst des Zeugdrucks, 1898), medieval Rhenish monasteries were the cradles of the craft of ornamental stamp- or block-cutting, although it is now recognised that some of the examples he relied on are modern forgeries. In rare monastic manuscripts earlier than the 13th century, initial letters (especially those that recurred frequently) were sometimes stamped from hand-cut blocks, and German deeds of the 14th century bear the names of block cutters and textile stampers as witnesses. Amongst the more ancient relics of Rhenish printed textiles are some thin silken fabrics, impressed with patterns in gold and silver foil. Specimens of these, as well as of a considerable number of later variously dyed stout linens with patterns printed in dark tones or in black, have been collected from reliquaries, tombs, and old churches.

The first written reference to printed textiles in Europe is found in Florentine trade regulations from the fifteenth century. In 1437, Cennino Cennini published a treatise describing the technique.

=== Early modern Europe ===
Augsburg, famous in the 17th century for its printing on linens, etc., supplied Alsace and Switzerland with many craftsmen in this process. After the revocation of the edict of Nantes, French refugees took part in starting manufactories of both painted and printed cloths in Holland, England and Switzerland; some few of the refugees were allowed back into France to do the same in Normandy: manufactories were also set up in Paris, Marseilles, Nantes and Angers; but there was still greater activity at Geneva, Neuchâtel, Zurich, St Gall and Basel. The first textile printing works in Great Britain are said to have been begun towards the end of the 17th century by a Frenchman on the banks of the Thames near Richmond, and soon afterwards a more considerable factory was established at Bromley Hall in Middlesex; many others were opened in Surrey early in the 18th century. At Mulhouse the enterprise of Koechlin, Schmatzer and Dollfus in 1746, as well as that of Oberkampf at Jouy, led to a still wider spread of the industry in Alsace. In almost every place in Europe where it was taken up and followed, it was met by local and national prohibitions or trade protective regulations and acts, which, however, were gradually overcome.

== Technique ==
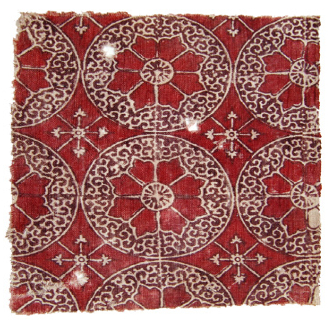
Textile fragment, 24 cm x 21 cm, made circa 1545 - 1645 AD. Produced in India for export, found in Fustat, Egypt. The brown colored pattern is formed by the use of a mordant applied to the ground cloth with a single stamp. The red dye was then painted on. The outline of the square block, forming four quarter circles with the star shape in the middle, is faintly visible.

=== Preparing the block ===
Woodblocks for textile printing may be made of box, lime, holly, sycamore, plane or pear wood, the latter three being most generally employed. They vary in size considerably, but must always be between two and three inches thick, otherwise they are liable to warping, which is additionally guarded against by backing the wood chosen with two or more pieces of cheaper wood, such as deal or pine. The several pieces or blocks are tongued and grooved to fit each other, and are then securely glued together, under pressure, into one solid block with the grain of each alternate piece running in a different direction.

The block, being planed quite smooth and perfectly flat, next has the design drawn upon, or transferred to it. This latter is effected by rubbing off, upon its flat surface, a tracing in lampblack and oil, of the outlines of the masses of the design. The portions to be left in relief are then tinted, between their outlines, an ammoniacal carmine or magenta, for the purpose of distinguishing them from those portions that have to be cut away. As a separate block is required for each distinct color in the design, a separate tracing must be made of each and transferred (or put on as it a termed) to its own special block.

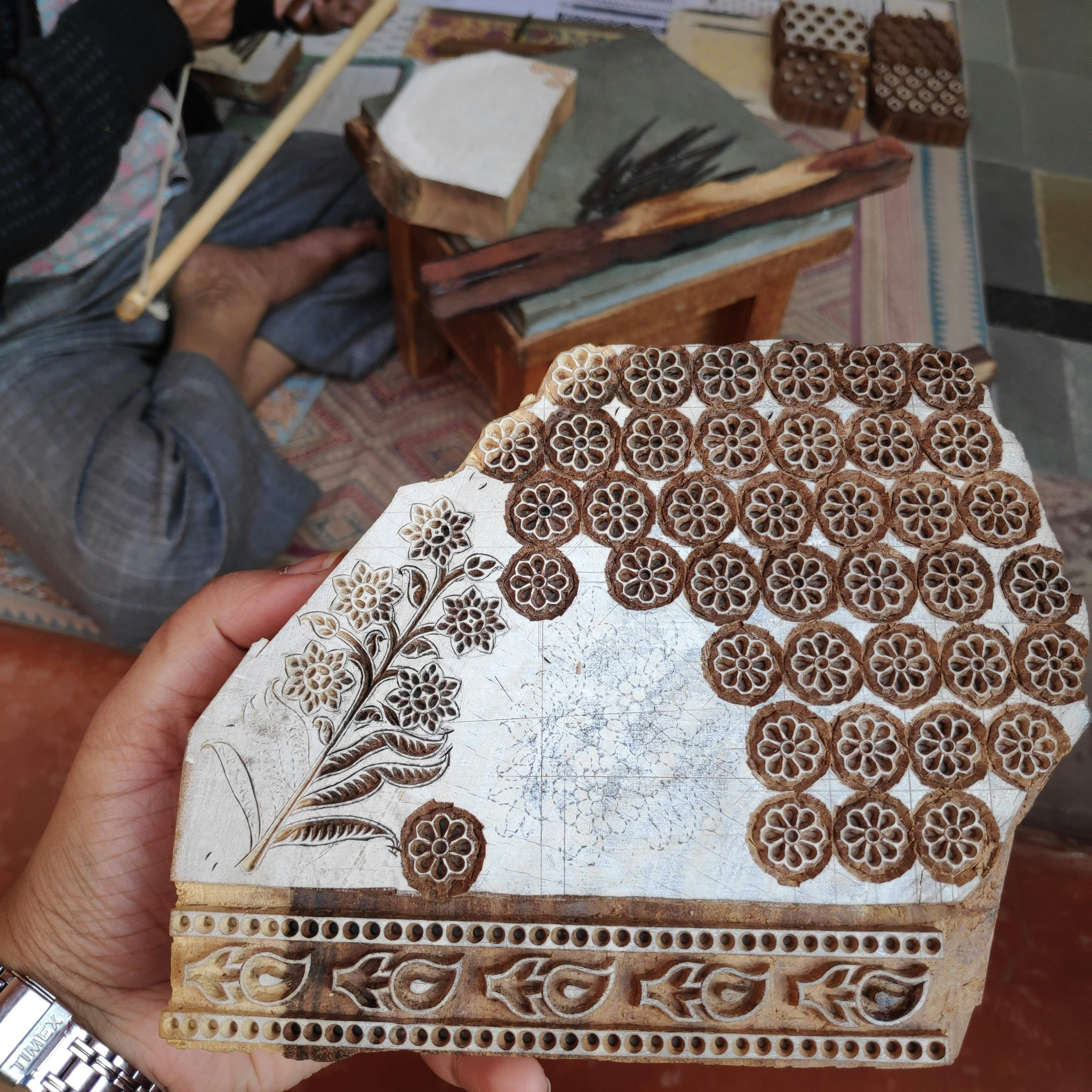
A master artist allows a close look at the wooden block he is carving at the Anokhi Museum in Jaipur, Rajasthan, India.

Having thus received a tracing of the pattern the block is thoroughly damped and kept in this condition by being covered with wet cloths during the whole process of cutting. The blockcutter commences by carving out the wood around the heavier masses first, leaving the finer and more delicate work until the last so as to avoid any risk of injuring it during the cutting of the coarser parts. When large masses of color occur in a pattern, the corresponding parts on the block are usually cut in outline, the object being filled in between the outlines with felt, which not only absorbs the color better, but gives a much more even impression than it is possible to obtain with a large surface of wood. When finished, the block presents the appearance of flat relief carving, the design standing out like letterpress type.

Fine details are very difficult to cut in wood, and, even when successfully cut, wear down very rapidly or break off in printing. They are therefore almost invariably built up in strips of brass or copper, bent to shape and driven edgewise into the flat surface of the block. This method is known as coppering, and by its means many delicate little forms, such as stars, rosettes and fine spots can be printed, which would otherwise be quite impossible to produce by hand or machine block printing.

Frequently, too, the process of coppering is used for the purpose of making a mold, from which an entire block can be made and duplicated as often as desired, by casting. In this case the metal strips are driven to a predetermined depth into the face of a piece of lime-wood cut across the grain, and, when the whole design is completed in this way, the block is placed, metal face downwards in a tray of molten type-metal or solder, which transmits sufficient heat to the inserted portions of the strips of copper to enable them to carbonize the wood immediately in contact with them and, at the same time, firmly attaches itself to the outstanding portions. When cold a slight tap with a hammer on the back of the limewood block easily detaches the cake of the type-metal or alloy and along with it, of course, the strips of copper to which it is firmly soldered, leaving a matrix, or mold, in wood of the original design. The casting is made in an alloy of low melting-point, anti, after cooling, is filed or ground until all its projections are of the same height and perfectly smooth, after which it is screwed onto a wooden support and is ready for printing. Similar molds are also made by burning out the lines of the pattern with a red-hot steel punch, capable of being raised or lowered at will, and under which the block is moved about by hand along the lines of the pattern.

=== Other tools ===
In addition to the engraved block, a printing table and color sieve are required. The table consists of a stout framework of wood or iron supporting a thick slab of stone varying in size according to the width of cloth to be printed. Over the stone table top a thick piece of woolen printer's blanket is tightly stretched to supply the elasticity necessary to give the block every chance of making a good impression on the cloth. At one end, the table is provided with a couple of iron brackets to carry the roll of cloth to be printed and, at the other, a series of guide rollers, extending to the ceiling, are arranged for the purpose of suspending and drying the newly printed goods. The color sieve consists of a tub (known as the swimming tub) half filled with starch paste, on the surface of which floats a frame covered at the bottom with a tightly stretched piece of mackintosh or oiled calico. On this the color sieve proper, a frame similar to the last but covered with fine woolen cloth, is placed, and forms when in position a sort of elastic color trough over the bottom of which the color is spread evenly with a brush.

=== Printing process ===
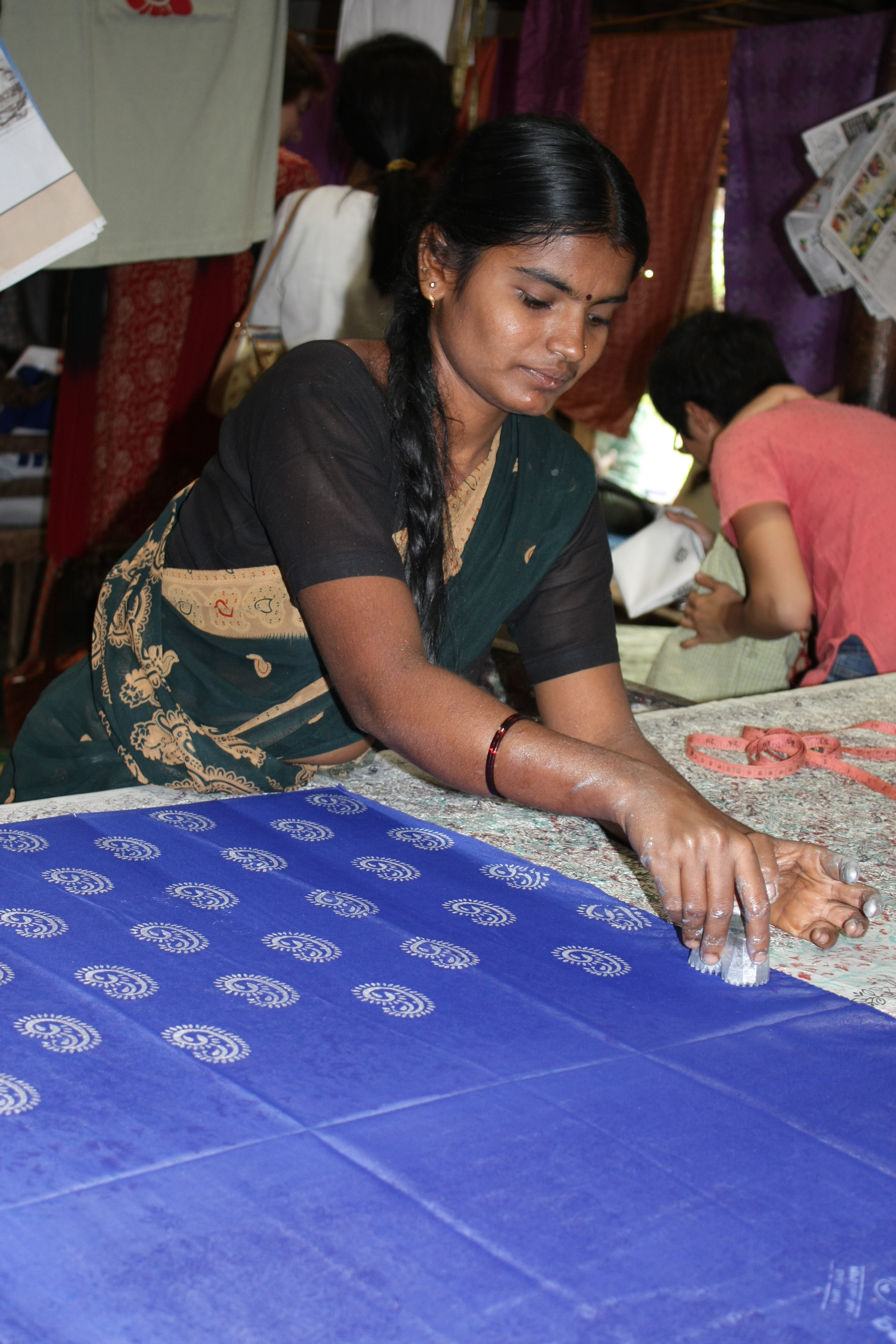
Woman doing Block Printing at Halasur village, Karnataka, India.

The printer commences by drawing a length of cloth, from the roll, over the table, and marks it with a piece of colored chalk and a ruler to indicate where the first impression of the block is to be applied.

The printer then applies the block in two different directions to the color on the sieve and finally presses it firmly and steadily on the cloth, ensuring a good impression by striking it smartly on the back with a wooden mallet. The second impression is made in the same way, the printer taking care to see that it fits exactly to the first, a point which he can make sure of by means of the pins with which the blocks are provided at each corner and which are arranged in such a way that when those at the right side or at the top of the block fall upon those at the left side or the bottom of the previous impression the two printings join up exactly and continue the pattern without a break. Each succeeding impression is made in precisely the same manner until the length of cloth on the table is fully printed. When this is done it is wound over the drying rollers, thus bringing forward a fresh length to be treated similarly.

If the pattern contains several colors the cloth is usually first printed throughout with one, then dried, re-wound and printed with the second, the same operations being repeated until all the colors are printed.

Many modifications of block printing have been tried from time to time, but of these only two tobying and rainbowing are of any practical value. The object of tobying is to print the several colors of a multicolor pattern at one operation and for this purpose a block with the whole of the pattern cut upon it, and a specially constructed color sieve are employed. The sieve consists of a thick block of wood, on one side of which a series of compartments are hollowed out, corresponding roughly in shape, size and position to the various objects cut on the block. The tops of the dividing walls of these compartments are then coated with melted pitch, and a piece of fine woolen cloth is stretched over the whole and pressed well down on the pitch so as to adhere firmly to the top of each wall; finally a piece of string soaked in pitch is cemented over the woolen cloth along the lines of the dividing walls, and after boring a hole through the bottom of each compartment the sieve is ready for use. In operation each compartment is filled with its special color through a pipe connecting it with a color box situated at the side of the sieve and a little above it, so as to exert just sufficient pressure on the color to force it gently through the woolen cloth, but not enough to cause it to overflow its proper limits, formed by the pitch-soaked string boundary lines.

The block is then carefully pressed on the sieve, and, as the different parts of its pattern fall on different parts of the sieve, each takes up a certain color that it transfers to the cloth in the usual way. By this method of tobying from two to six colors may be printed at one operation, but it is only applicable to patterns where the different colored objects are placed at some small distance apart.

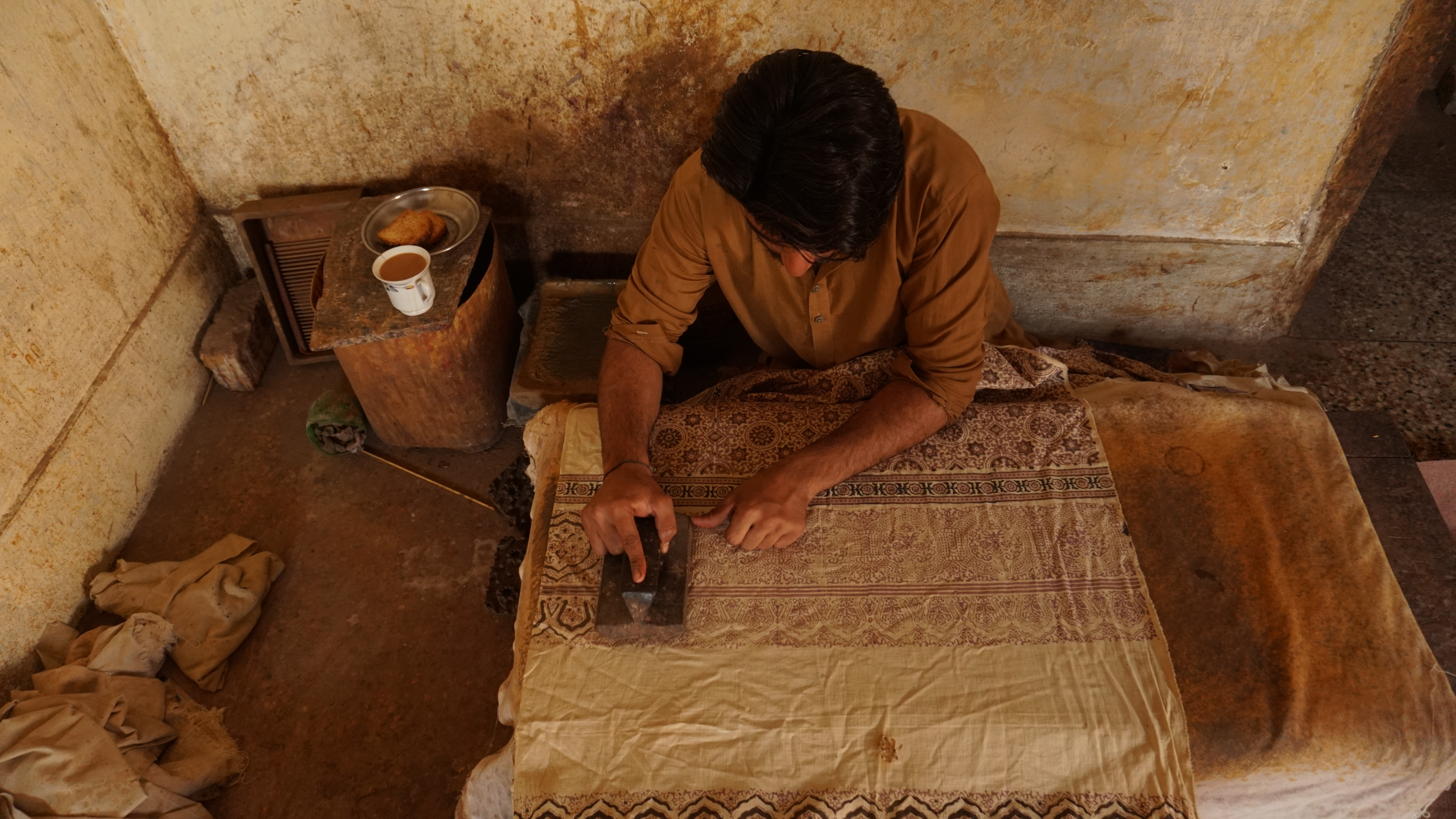
Block printing

== Contemporary practice ==
In India, hand block printing on textiles remains an active craft industry, particularly in Jaipur, Rajasthan, where it has been practised for centuries. Artisans continue to use carved wooden blocks and traditional dyeing methods—including natural dyes such as indigo, madder, and turmeric—to produce home textiles including bed linen, cushion covers, and table linen for domestic consumption and international export.

== See also ==
- Arjak
- Bagh Prints
- Rogan printing
- Bagru Print
