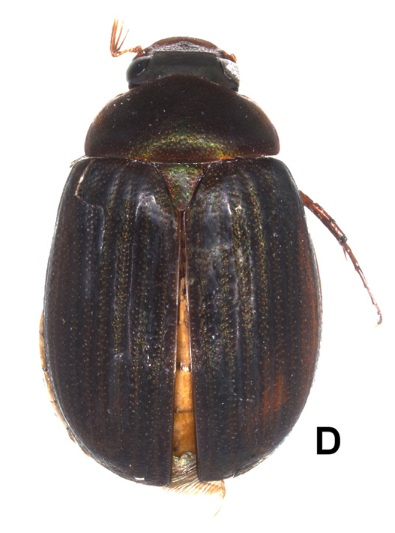

Scientific classification
- Kingdom: Animalia
- Phylum: Arthropoda
- Clade: Pancrustacea
- Class: Insecta
- Order: Coleoptera
- Suborder: Polyphaga
- Infraorder: Scarabaeiformia
- Family: Scarabaeidae
- Genus: Tetraserica
- Species: T. pailinensis

Binomial name
- Tetraserica pailinensis Fabrizi, Dalstein & Ahrens, 2019

= Tetraserica pailinensis =

Species of beetle

Tetraserica pailinensis is a species of beetle of the family Scarabaeidae. It is found in Cambodia.

== Description ==
Adults reach a length of about 8–8.5 mm. The surface of the labroclypeus and the disc of the frons are glabrous. The smooth area anterior to the eye is twice as wide as long.

== Etymology ==
The species is named after the type locality, Pailin.
