= Streptomyces roietensis =

Scientific classification
- Domain: Bacteria
- Kingdom: Bacillati
- Phylum: Actinomycetota
- Class: Actinomycetes
- Order: Streptomycetales
- Family: Streptomycetaceae
- Genus: Streptomyces
- Species: S. roietensis

Binomial name
- Streptomyces roietensis Kaewkla and Franco 2017

Type strain
- DSM 101729, NRRL B-65344, strain WES2

Species of bacterium

Streptomyces roietensis is a bacterium species from the genus of Streptomyces which has been isolated from the stem of a jasmine rice plant from Thung Gura Rong Hai in Thailand.

== See also ==
- List of Streptomyces species
