= Nuon Chea =

Cambodian politician and war criminal (1926–2019)

- នួន ជា
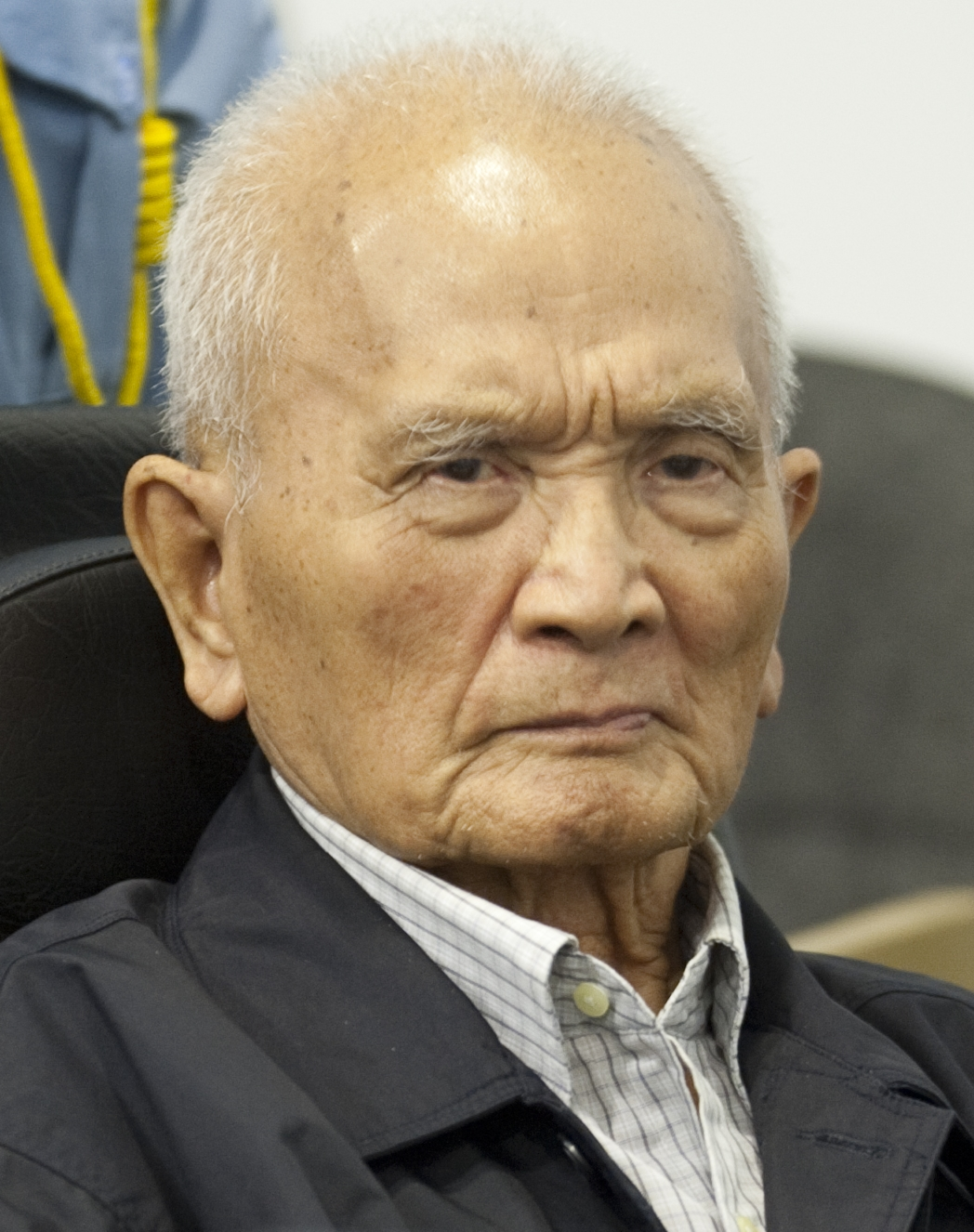
- Chea in 2013

President of the Standing Committee of the Kampuchean People's Representative Assembly
- In office 13 April 1975 – 7 January 1979
- President: Khieu Samphan
- Deputy: Chhit Choeun
- Leader: Pol Pot (General Secretary)
- Preceded by: Office established
- Succeeded by: Position abolished

Prime Minister of Democratic Kampuchea
- Acting; 27 September 1976 – 25 October 1976
- President: Khieu Samphan
- Leader: Pol Pot (General Secretary)
- Preceded by: Pol Pot
- Succeeded by: Pol Pot

Deputy Secretary of the Communist Party of Kampuchea
- In office 30 September 1960 – 6 December 1981
- General Secretary: Tou Samouth; Pol Pot
- Preceded by: Position established
- Succeeded by: None, party dissolved

Personal details
- Born: Lao Kim Lorn; 7 July 1926 Voat Kor, Battambang, Cambodia, French Indochina
- Died: 4 August 2019 (aged 93) Phnom Penh, Cambodia
- Resting place: Sala Krau, Pailin, Cambodia
- Party: Communist Party of Kampuchea (1960–1981)
- Other political affiliations: Communist Party of Siam
- Spouse: Ly Kimseng
- Children: 4
- Education: Thammasat University
- Criminal information
- Convictions: Crimes against humanity and genocide
- Penalty: Life imprisonment (2014)

Nuon Chea (Khmer: នួន ជា; born Lao Kim Lorn; 7 July 1926 – 4 August 2019), also known as Long Bunruot (ឡុង ប៊ុនរត្ន) or Rungloet Laodi (រុងឡឺត ឡាវឌី; Thai: รุ่งเลิศ เหล่าดี), was a Cambodian politician and revolutionary who was the chief ideologist of the Khmer Rouge. He also briefly served as acting Prime Minister of Democratic Kampuchea. He was commonly known as "Brother Number Two" (បងធំទី២), as he was second-in-command to Khmer Rouge leader Pol Pot, General Secretary of the Party, during the Cambodian genocide of 1975–1979. In 2014, Nuon Chea received a life sentence for crimes against humanity, alongside another top-tier Khmer Rouge leader, Khieu Samphan, and a further trial convicted him of genocide in 2018. These life sentences were merged into a single life sentence by the Trial Chamber on 16 November 2018. He died while serving his sentence in 2019. Nuon Chea was a proponent of what he called "Dialectical Materialist Buddhism".

== Early life ==
Nuon Chea was born as Lao Kim Lorn at Voat Kor, Battambang, on 7 July 1926. Nuon's father, Lao Liv, worked as a trader as well as a corn farmer, while his mother, Dos Peanh, was a tailor. An interview by a Japanese researcher in 2003 with Nuon Chea quoted that Liv was Chinese, while Peanh was the daughter of a Chinese immigrant from Shantou and his Khmer wife. In 2011, however, Chea told the Khmer Rouge Tribunal that he was only a quarter Chinese through his half-Chinese father. As a child, Nuon Chea was raised in both Chinese and Khmer customs. The family prayed at a Theravada Buddhist temple, but observed Chinese religious customs during the Lunar New Year and Qingming festival. Nuon Chea started school at age seven, and was educated in Thai, French, and Khmer.

In the 1940s, Nuon Chea studied at Wat Benchamabophit School and Faculty of Law, Thammasat University, in Bangkok and worked part-time for the Thai Ministry of Foreign Affairs. He began his political activities in the Communist Party of Siam in Bangkok. In September 1960 he was elected Deputy General Secretary of the Workers Party of Kampuchea, which was later renamed the Communist Party of Kampuchea (CPK). In Democratic Kampuchea, he was generally known as "Brother Number Two". Unlike most of the leaders of the Khmer Rouge, Chea was not educated in France.

== Career ==
As documented in the Soviet archives, Nuon Chea played a major role in negotiating the North Vietnamese invasion of Cambodia in 1970, with the intent of forcing the collapse of Lon Nol's government:

"In April–May 1970, many North Vietnamese forces entered Cambodia in response to the call for help addressed to Vietnam not by Pol Pot, but by his deputy Nuon Chea. Nguyen Co Thach recalls: "Nuon Chea has asked for help and we have liberated five provinces of Cambodia in ten days." In 1970, in fact, Vietnamese forces occupied almost a quarter of the territory of Cambodia, and the zone of communist control grew several times, as power in the so-called liberated regions was given to the CPK [Khmer Rouge]. At that time, relations between Pol Pot and the North Vietnamese leaders were especially warm."

The North Vietnamese trusted Nuon Chea more than Pol Pot or Ieng Sary, although Chea "consistently and consciously deceived the Vietnamese principals concerning the real plans of the Khmer leadership." As a result, "Hanoi did not undertake any action to change the power pattern within the top ranks of the Communist Party to their own benefit." According to Dmitry Mosyakov:

"In October 1978, Hanoi still believed that 'there were two prominent party figures in Phnom Penh who sympathized with Vietnam—Nuon Chea and the former first secretary of the Eastern Zone, So Phim. Vietnamese hopes that these figures would head an uprising against Pol Pot turned out to be groundless: So Phim perished during the revolt in June 1978, while Nuon Chea, as it is known, turned out to be one of the most devoted followers of Pol Pot—he did not defect to the Vietnamese side....It is difficult to understand why until the end of 1978 it was believed in Hanoi that Nuon Chea was 'their man' in spite of the fact that all previous experience should have proved quite the contrary. Was Hanoi unaware of his permanent siding with Pol Pot, his demands that 'the Vietnamese minority should not be allowed to reside in Kampuchea', his extreme cruelty, as well as of the fact that, 'in comparison with Nuon Chea, people considered Pol Pot a paragon of kindness'?"

The Kampuchean People's Representative Assembly held its first plenary session during 11–13 April 1976, where Chea was elected president of its Standing Committee. He briefly held office as acting prime minister when Pol Pot resigned for one month, citing health reasons.

When the Vietnamese captured Phnom Penh in January 1979, Nuon Chea was forced to abandon his position as president of the Assembly. Prison commander Kaing Khek Iev (also known as Comrade Duch) described Chea as "the principal man [responsible] for the killings", and stated that Chea "ordered me to kill all the remaining prisoners" at Tuol Sleng shortly before the regime's ouster; Chea was reportedly "furious" that Duch failed to destroy Tuol Sleng's extensive archives documenting torture and mass murder at the prison before the Vietnamese took the site.

In December 1998, Chea surrendered as part of the last remnants of Khmer Rouge resistance which was based in Pailin near the Thailand border. The government under Prime Minister Hun Sen, himself a former member of the Khmer Rouge, agreed to forsake attempts to prosecute Chea, a decision that was condemned by Western nations. American journalist Nate Thayer, the last person to interview Pol Pot, described Nuon Chea as "probably more guilty than Pol Pot himself for the actual killings that went on while the Khmer Rouge were in power."

== Arrest and trial ==
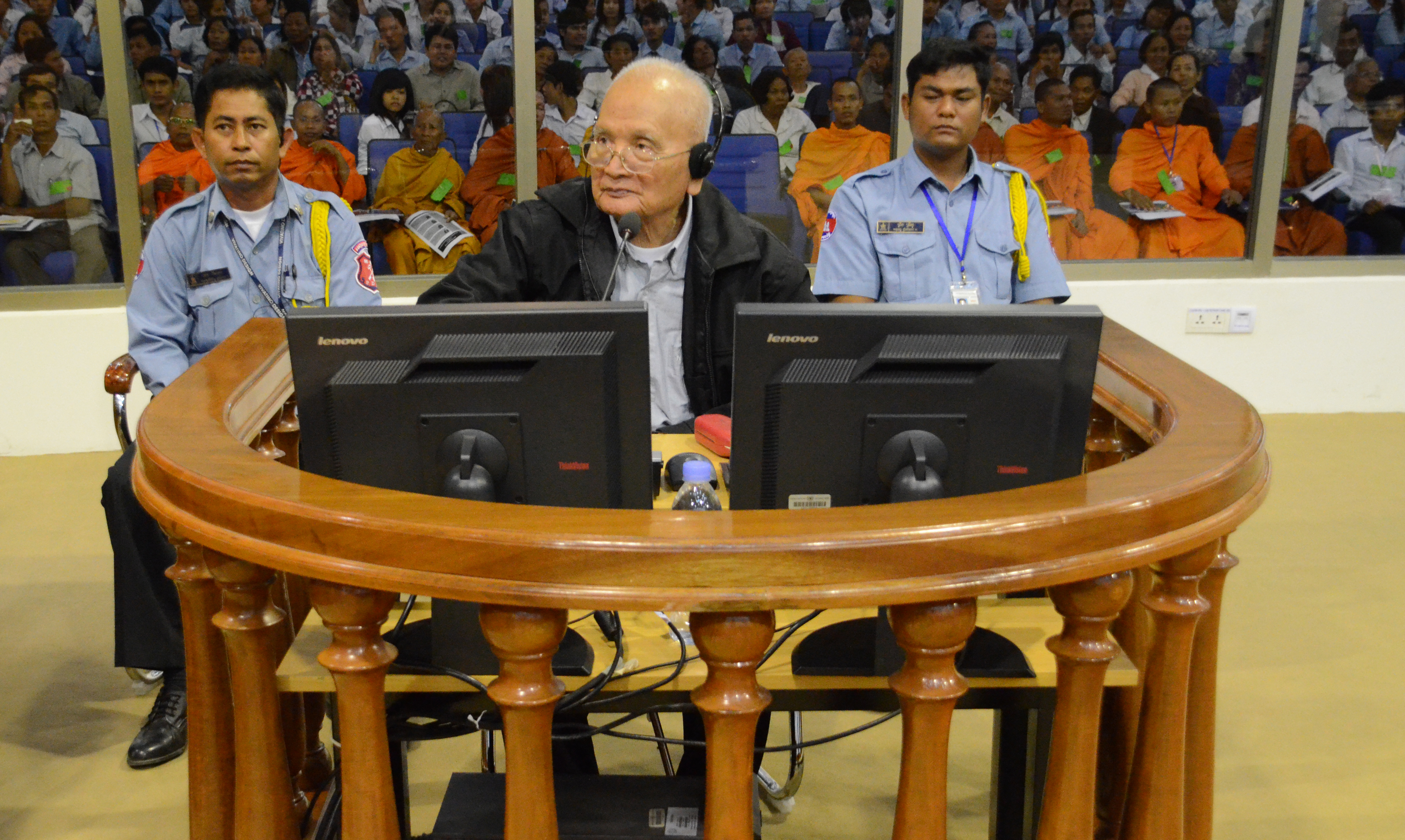
Chea on trial at the Khmer Rouge Tribunal, 5 December 2011

On 19 September 2007, Chea (aged 81) was arrested at his home in Pailin and flown to the Khmer Rouge Tribunal in Phnom Penh, which charged him with war crimes and crimes against humanity. He was held continuously in detention after his arrest. In February 2008, Chea told the court that his case should be handled according to international standards. He argued that the court should delay proceedings because his Dutch lawyer, Michiel Pestman, had not yet arrived.

In May 2013, Chea told the court and the victims' families, "I feel remorseful for the crimes that were committed intentionally or unintentionally, whether or not I had known about it or not known about it." On 7 August 2014, the court convicted Chea of crimes against humanity and sentenced him to imprisonment for the remainder of his life. His lawyer immediately announced that Chea would appeal against his conviction. Chea faced a separate trial for the crime of genocide in the same court. The court found him and Khieu Samphan guilty of genocide against the Vietnamese people and the Chams on 16 November 2018. These life sentences were merged into a single life sentence by the Trial Chamber on 16 November 2018.

In his closing brief before the court, numbering some 500 pages, Chea "blamed Vietnamese agents for virtually everything that went wrong during Khmer Rouge rule". He also denied responsibility for mass killings, but this was contradicted by detailed documentation left behind by the Khmer Rouge regime itself, including bizarre "confessions" extracted under torture at Tuol Sleng and photographs of purge victims, as well as a recording made by a Cambodian journalist prior to Chea's 2007 arrest in which Chea admitted: "Believe me, if these traitors were alive, the Khmers as a people would have been finished. ... If we had shown mercy to these people, the nation would have been lost."

== Death ==
Nuon Chea died on 4 August 2019 at the Khmer–Soviet Friendship Hospital in Phnom Penh, aged 93. He had been hospitalized since 2 July for improper blood circulation to his toe, which turned black. Lack of proper blood flow led to infection of his toe, which eventually killed him, most likely by causing sepsis of blood and eventual multiple organs failure. His body was later brought to Sala Krau, Pailin, before cremation in accordance with Buddhist tradition.

== See also ==
- Enemies of the People
- Cambodian genocide

Political offices
Preceded by Pol Pot	Prime Minister of Democratic Kampuchea; 1976	Succeeded by Pol Pot
