= Y Chhean =

Cambodian politician

Y Chhean is a Cambodian politician. He belongs to the Cambodian People's Party and was elected to represent Pailin in the National Assembly of Cambodia in 2003.

His wife is provincial governor Ban Sreymom.
