= Kula people (Asia) =

Kula
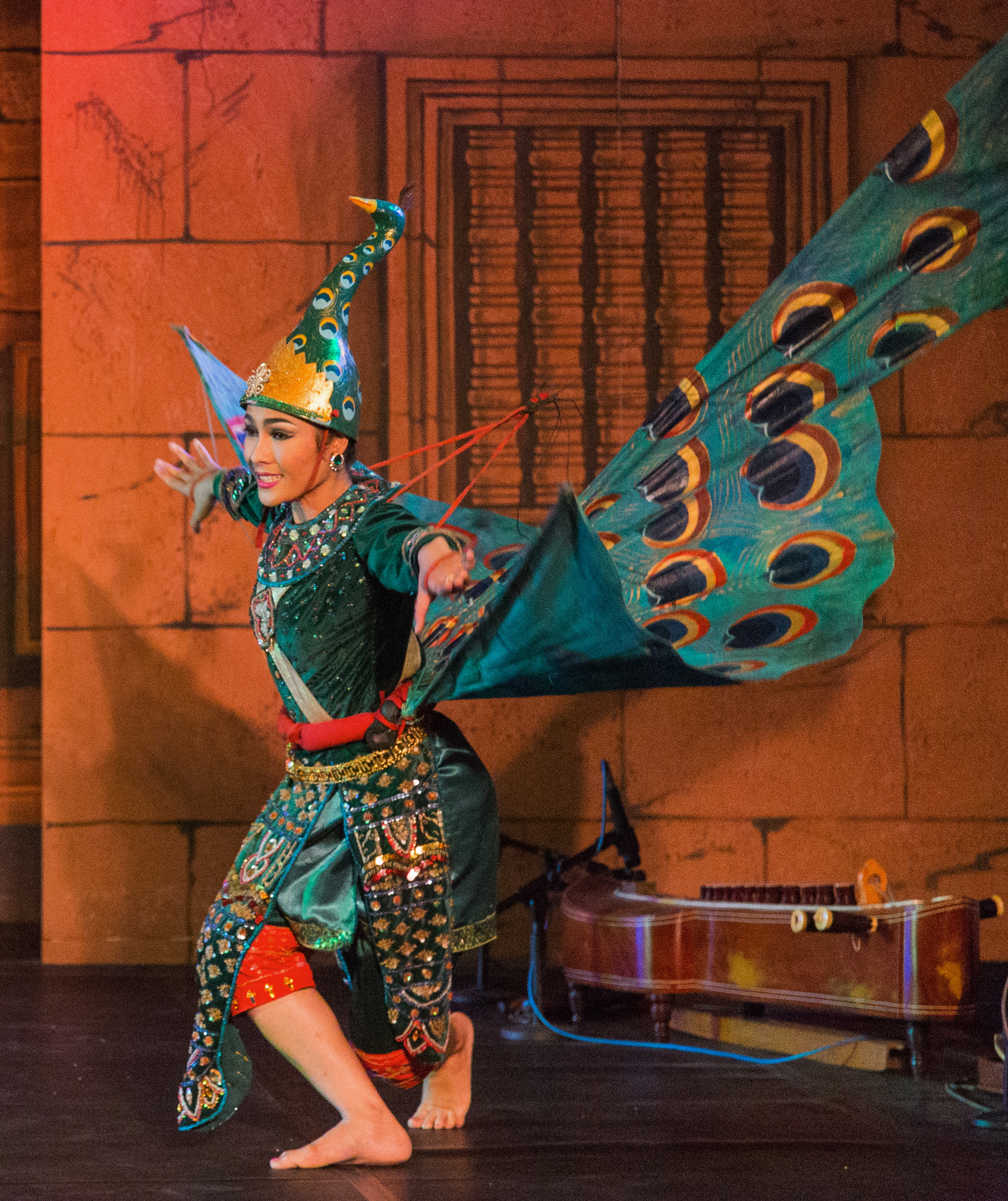
- Pailin Peacock Dance is a traditional Kula dance from Pailin province in Cambodia.

Regions with significant populations
- Cambodia, Thailand

Languages
- Burmese, Shan, Pa'O, Mon, Khmer, Thai, Isan

Religion
- Theravada Buddhism, Animism

Related ethnic groups
- Bamar, Shan, Pa'O, Mon, Jingpo

The Kula people (Thai: กุลา; Khmer: កុឡា, Kŏla [kolaː]; also spelt Gula and Kola) are the descendants of migrants from Burma who settled in the Pailin-Chanthaburi region along the Cambodia–Thailand border during the 19th century. To which Burmese ethnic group the Kulas belong remains uncertain, with some speculating a Bamar, Shan or multi-ethnic heritage.

== Terminology ==
The term Kula appears to be referring to a variety of Burmese ethnicities forming a community in regions along the border between Cambodia and Thailand. Indeed Thai documents from the 1870s and 1880s use the words Toongsoo (တောင်သူ Taungthu in Burmese) and Kula interchangeably. Toongsoo (or Tongsú) was used in the 19th century as a designation for the Karen tribe in general, but also for a Tai trader tribe closely related to Shan people known for dealing in elephant and horses. The Shan pronunciation of the Burmese word taungthu "hill man", refers to the Pa'O, an ethnic group within the Karen people.

Kula also refers to miners in the Chanthaburi and Pailin provinces who are believed to be of Burmese descent. At the end of the 19th century, it was discovered that the Mon had also immigrated to the area, further muddying the definition. Cambodians sometimes refer to them as "the jungle people," as the jungle in the region originally stretched from Dawei to Mawlamyine.

During the 19th century, the residents of Pailin province were reported to be Bamar, Pégouan, Shan and Toung-thoo. They had been trading in the northern regions of Thailand during the reign of Rama III (1824-1851), expanding into the northeast regions during the reign of Rama IV (1851-1868). In Battambang province in Cambodia, to which Pailin province formerly belonged, records from 1910 indicate a population comprising 4,000 Burmans and 500 Shan inhabitants. Étienne Lunet de Lajonquière, a French military officer, described Pailin and the nearby town of Bo-Ya-Ka in 1910 as primarily Bamar settlements. The appearance of the houses and the architecture of the pagodas were said to be reminiscent of Mawlamyine in Burma. He further adds:

"In the streets, Burman people walk around, wearing silk turbans in the elegant Burman fashion, their hair styled in cylindrical buns resembling crowns. The men stroll around smoking enormous cigars, while the women, tightly wrapped in their multicoloured silk sarongs, walk in lines, carrying large baskets of flowers to the pagoda altars."

== Languages ==
The Kula people speak Burmese, Shan, Pa'O and Mon as first languages. Many also speak Khmer or Thai as second languages.

== History ==
=== Journey in Thailand ===
Kula merchants traded in Isan and along the banks of the Mekong. Their presence in Isan is recorded as early as the reign of King Rama IV. The first written record of Kula in the region comes from a dispute between a Kula merchant over the purchase of 577 cattle from the governors of Roi Et, Suwannaphum, and Khon Kaen, who refused to hand over the cattle. The Kula were protected at that time by Britain, therefore Bangkok acted as mediator and returned the 2764 baht owed.

Kula merchants travelled in caravans, some of which consisted of 100 or more people who rode in ox carts and on horses and elephants. The merchants would buy and sell many types of items including elephants, ivory, horns, tusks and antlers, silk, water buffalo, firearms, and other assorted items. Smaller caravans would consist of only 5 to 50 members and would be heavily armed with knives and swords but also sacred magic charms for protection. The Kula distinguished themselves by being nomadic and staying in temples, or in the jungle, prairies and forests. The Thung Kula Ronghai, or 'plain of the crying Kula' is so named in memory of the nomadic Kula. It is a vast, arid plain, with areas of the swamp as well. Sparsely populated during the early 19th century, many caravans would become lost, never to find their way out. The communities in the plain erected large wooden poles and planted trees as route markers. There were five main routes through the plain: from Dong Paya Fai, Nakhon Ratchasima to Pak Phriao, Saraburi; from Dong Paya Klang, Nakhon Ratchasima to Sanam Chang, Lopburi; from Thanko pass in Nakhon Ratchasima into Kabin Buri District, Prachinburi through Panatnikom in Saraburi to Phanom Sarakham District, Chachoengsao; from Mottama, Mawlamyine, Myanmar to Phetchabun to the Rahaeng Subdistrict in Tak; and from the Jorn Pass in Surin to Sisophon, Cambodia.

As travelling merchants, the Kula played a major role in providing communities in Isan with essential goods, skills and information. They aided the spread of skills such as ironwork and goldsmithing in rural communities and spread information from town to town. As the regional economy advanced and began to prosper, the Kula faced competition from Chinese and Indian merchants as well as individual Thai. Paved roads and railways were built, linking Bangkok and Nakhon Ratchasima, making goods more easily available to remote regions also contributed to the decline of Kula trading. When the Bowring Treaty ended, it sealed the demise of Kula merchant-caravans in Thailand. Small caravans of Kula still continued to travel to Thailand into the 20th century and many Kula descendants living in northern Thailand still practice their nomadic tradition of trading throughout Isan, though they sell pottery and artificial flowers now.

Kula would sometimes settle in a community once they married, while others returned to Cambodia once the trading era was over. Many Kula traditions and customs have disappeared over the generations through assimilation with local Thai and Lao communities.

=== Journey in Cambodia ===
Kula horseman in Pailin, Cambodia, an area famous for its sapphires. From Five Years in Siam by H. Warington Smyth, 1898.

During the 19th century, many Kula immigrated to Pailin, Cambodia. According to R. Blandat, a group of Shan from Chanthaburi found a precious stone that they mined. They told the Kula, who, as traders, made money from the venture. Rumours of the gem attracted Chinese, Laos and Vietnamese to the area. The wealthier Kula in Bangkok and the Shan royalty also immigrated to Cambodia, due to economic reasons.

Because of the large Kula population being centred in a small area, the residents sought to set up their own state. Another wave of migrants arrived from Burma in the late 19th century and early 20th century. On the Cambodian side of the Thai-Cambodia border, Lung Musu discovered, in 1890, a sapphire field in Pailin. Lung returned to Yangon, Burma where he showed the sapphire to the local Shan community. The local merchants organized an expedition first to survey the land and then to recruit Shan families from Laikha, Mok Mai and Meng Nai to settle the area. They constructed a Buddhist temple and a monastic order to take control of the mine. More Shan continued to flock to the area and built Wat Phnom Yat.

The Kula who lived in Pailin worked in the mines and also in the new business of heating. During the French Indochina period, a French gem merchant conducted experiments with the Pailin stones, which showed their efficacy in heat retention. The local French maintained a good relationship with the Kula, and as such many Kula travelled to France to study, returning to Cambodia afterwards.

During that time, Pailin's economy grew and the livelihood of the Kula people grew with it. In the 1960s, Pailin became a tourist destination, jolting the Kula people into the modern-day, forcing their culture to change. For example, Kula traditionally kept their hair long and braided, and the men wore sarongs but with increased knowledge of the outside world, many Kula cut their hair cut and started wearing trousers.

=== Khmer Rouge ===
The Khmer Rouge rule struck the Kula people hard. Pailin became a Khmer Rouge stronghold for 30 years, while the Kula people were forced to become soldiers on the border of Lao. Some fled to Thailand while the rest were put to hard labour in the mines. This era is known as the time when the Kula culture was lost.

== Culture ==
Many Kula traditions have roots in the Bamar and Shan cultures.

=== Clothing and cultural dress ===
The Kula style of dress is similar to that of people in Pailin, including the traditional umbrella. Kula used to be referred to as "Burmese Cambodian" or "Khmer Shan" but are no longer called either of those.

The majority of travelling merchants were male and dressed differently from the locals. Most of their attire was described as similar to the clothing of Burma, Mon, Dai or Shan while some dressed like Karieng. Kula pants are mostly made from cotton and dyed in dark colours. Pants were wide-legged and ankle or knee-length, much like Chinese shorts, and were fastened with drawstrings. Men would also wear sarongs, checkered and in dark colours.

Sue Taek Bung shirts are collared shirts, made from a single piece of cloth buttoned in the front. Most shirts were black, dark blue and white in colour. The longyi or sarong, is often sown in a cylindrical shape, worn from the waist to the feet. It is secured with a knot. It is made from cotton or, occasionally, silk. Men almost always wear a white eingyi shirt with a Mandarin collar, sometimes with a taikpon jacket. Taikpon is usually white, grey, black or terracotta. Men also wear a gaung baung turban and velvet slippers. The Kula hairstyle includes long hair tied on top of the head under the turban.

Women wear calf-length longyi in solid colours, flower prints or patterns. They are often red-based with stripes or small checks, similar to Mon styles. Royal women wore a long dress called a thin-dai, which was decorated with many threads. Blouses were highly ornamented with silver and were colourful. Women tie a shawl over their shoulders and wear hair bands with flowers in them. Like the men, women carry umbrellas made from bamboo and wear slippers called hnyat-phanat made of velvet or leather. Women pierced their ears and wore kajorn, or earrings, made from silver. Kajorn were worn in pairs, while regular earrings were worn only on the left earlobe. All of these clothes were exchanged for bright colored clothing during celebrations. The clothing is very similar to what is worn by the Shan in Burma.

=== Cuisine ===
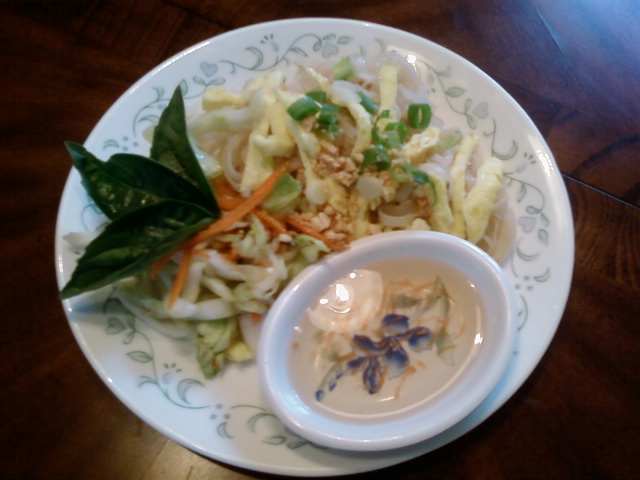
Kola noodles

In Pailin, Kula cuisine is distinct from Burmese cuisine. It includes noodles, boiled eggs, peanuts, pickles and/or a choice of meat. These have all spread to other parts of Thailand and Cambodia.

Moreover, Kula merchants ate plain rice and would always carry kitchenware and utensils made from brass along with them on their travels. They mostly made and prepared their own meals and would eat among themselves because they had strict rules regarding proper food. Kula do not eat meat from cows, ox or water buffalo. Their restraint from these meat products was based upon the fact that the animal provided labour and was also the main part of their trade. They would only make meals from animals who were still fresh and died of known causes.

They would also not eat frogs or fish that were found dead rather than killed for their meat. Vegetables were common in Kula diet, and were consumed in many varieties. The Kula were experts in plant lore from their reliance on the natural resources that were available during their travels. Tea was often consumed in place of water and was a regular staple at their homes and during their travel. Alcohol consumption was forbidden because Kula merchants practised magic to protect them on their journeys and alcohol was believed to prevent this.

=== Architecture ===
The houses in Pailin are built from wood panels, 8 cm (3.1 in) to 1 m (3 ft 3 in) wide, and include a wide door. In the middle of houses, there are shrines to Gautama Buddha. The Kula often plant roses in front of their homes.
