= Black rice =

Type of rice

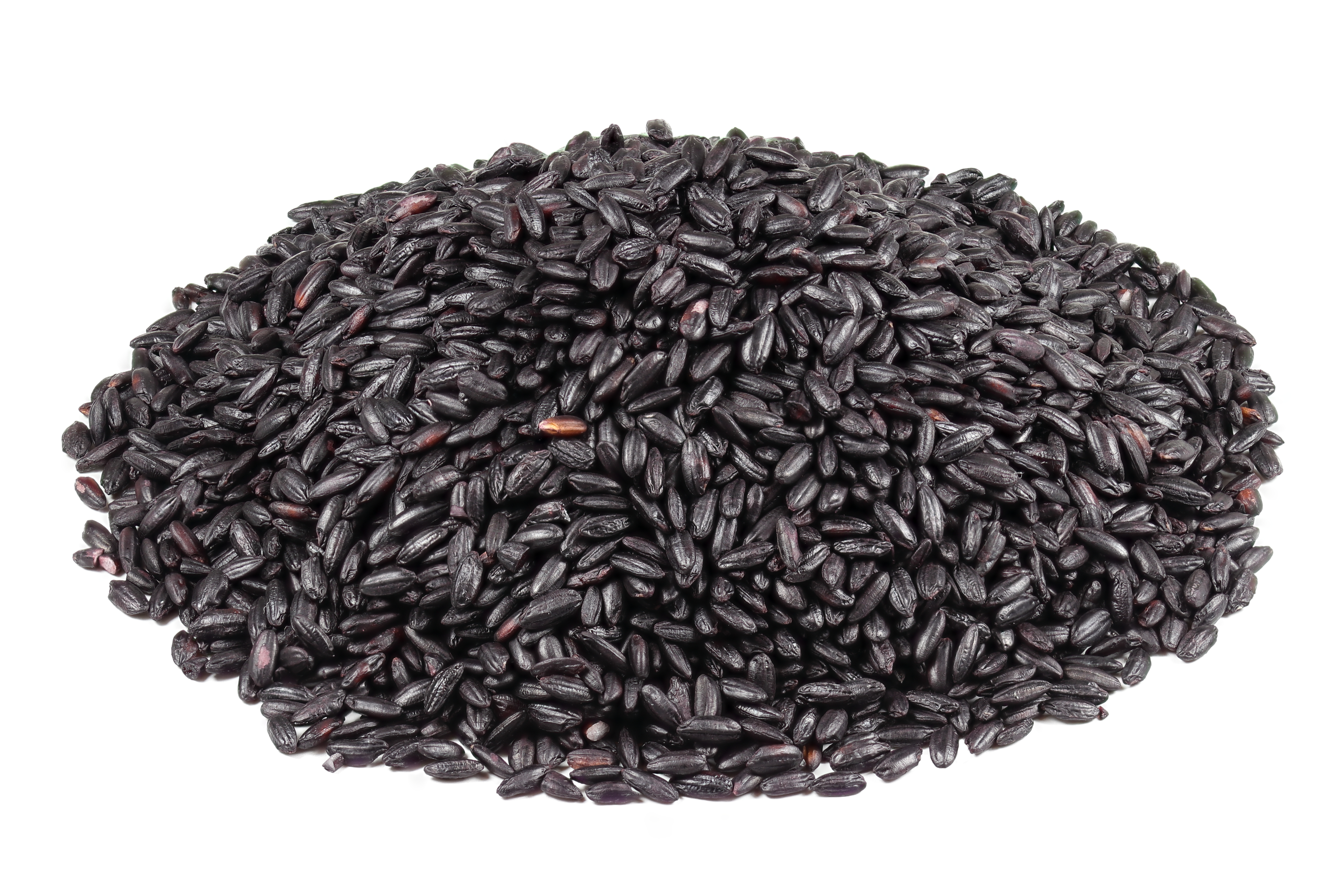
Black rice

Black rice, also known as purple rice or forbidden rice, is a type of rice of the species Oryza sativa, some of which are glutinous rice.

There are several varieties of black rice, including Indonesian black rice, Philippine heirloom balatinaw black rice, pirurutong black glutinous rice, and Thai jasmine black rice. It is also known as chak-hao in Manipur, India and as "kavuni arisi" or "kavuni rice" in Tamil Nadu, India.

The bran hull (outermost layer) of black rice contains high levels of anthocyanin pigment. The grain has a similar amount of fiber to brown rice and like brown rice, has a mild, nutty taste.

Black rice has a deep black color and usually turns deep purple when cooked. Its dark purple color is primarily due to its anthocyanin content, which is higher by weight than that of other colored grains. It is suitable for creating porridge, dessert, traditional Chinese black rice cake, bread, and noodles.

== History ==
In marketing, black rice may be called "forbidden rice", based on claims that it was once reserved for Chinese royalty. Its rarity, color, and low yield may have contributed to its association with privilege and imperial use in ancient China.

Rice, black, cooked
Nutritional value per 100 g (3.5 oz)
- Energy: 100 kcal (420 kJ)
- Carbohydrates: 21.21 g
- Sugars: 0.73 g
- Dietary fiber: 1.8 g
- Fat: 0.34 g
- Protein: 3.97 g
Vitamins and minerals
Vitamins	Quantity %DV^{†}
Thiamine (B1)	4% 0.052 mg
Riboflavin (B2)	7% 0.086 mg
Niacin (B3)	8% 1.279 mg
Pantothenic acid (B5)	8% 0.38 mg
Vitamin B6	8% 0.134 mg
Folate (B9)	7% 26 μg
Minerals	Quantity %DV^{†}
Calcium	0% 3 mg
Copper	13% 0.12 mg
Iron	3% 0.6 mg
Magnesium	8% 32 mg
Phosphorus	7% 82 mg
Potassium	3% 100 mg
Sodium	10% 238 mg
Zinc	12% 1.33 mg
- Other constituents: Quantity
- Water: 73 g
- Link to USDA FoodData Central entry
- ^{†}Percentages estimated using US recommendations for adults, except for potassium, which is estimated based on expert recommendation from the National Academies.

The blackness trait occurred from alteration of a gene called Kala4, which activates the production of anthocyanin pigments. The black tropical japonica gene may have spread into rice subspecies via natural transfer of genes through multiple crosses and by purposeful cultivation for the black trait.

== Nutrition ==
Cooked wild black rice is 73% water, 21% carbohydrates, 4% protein, and 0.3% fat (table). In a reference amount of 100 g (3.5 oz), cooked black rice supplies 100 calories of food energy, and is a moderate source (10-19% of the Daily Value, DV) of sodium, zinc, and copper (10-13% DV, table).

== Gallery ==
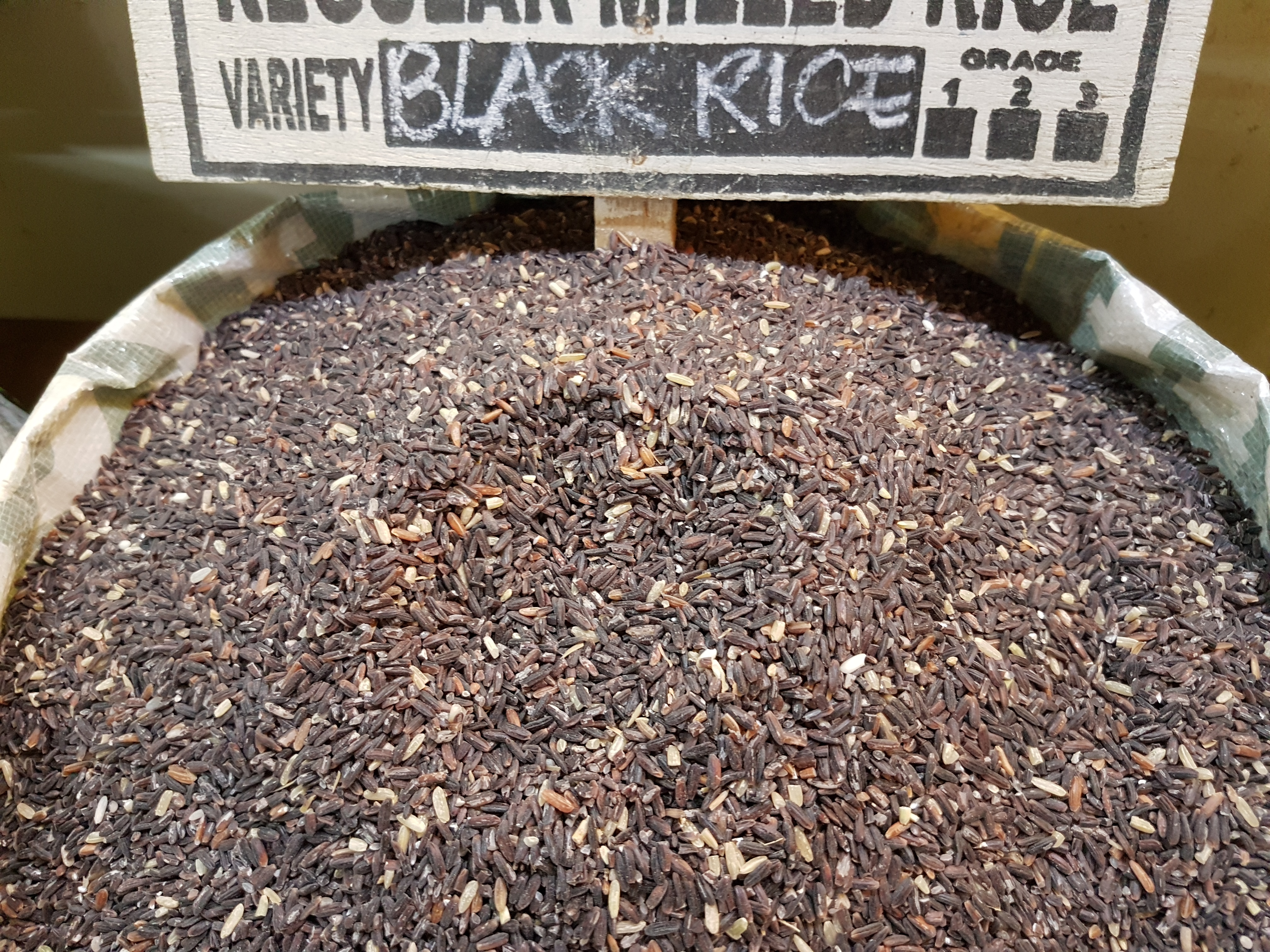
Balatinaw (or Balatinao), an heirloom black rice from Mountain Province, Philippines

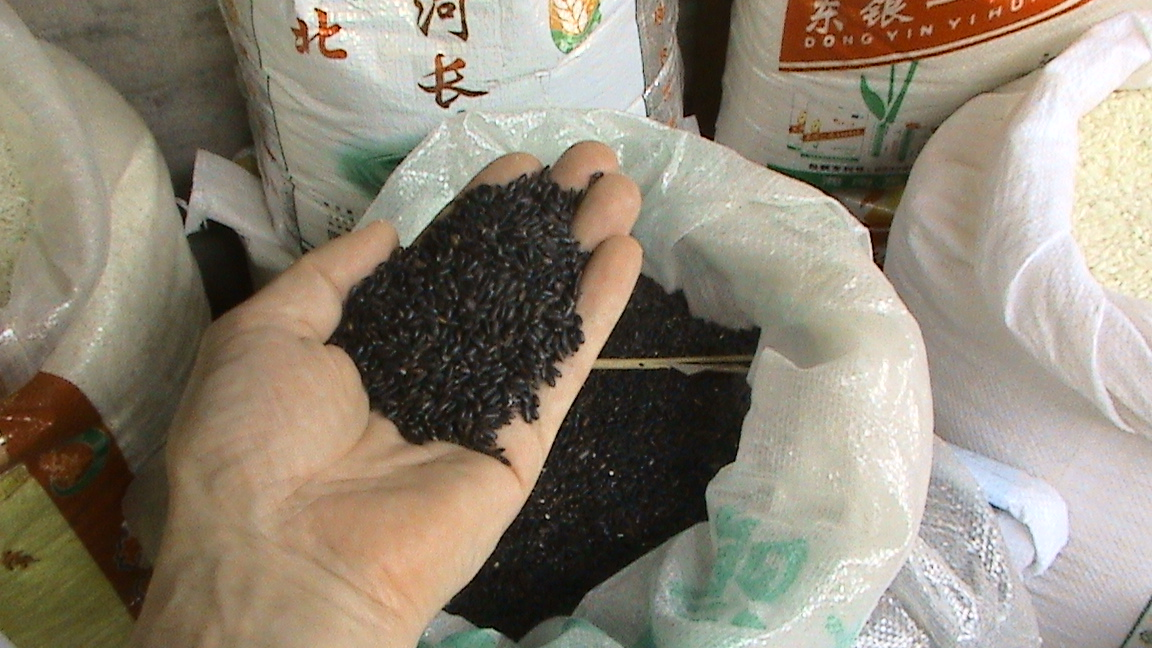
Black rice, China

== See also ==
- Arròs negre
- Riceberry
- Wild rice
