= Sala Krau District =

District in Pailin Province, Cambodia

Sala Krau សាលាក្រៅ
- District
- Sala Krau District ស្រុកសាលាក្រៅ
- Location in Cambodia
- Country: Cambodia
- Province: Pailin

Area
  - Total: 575 km^{2} (222 sq mi)

Population (1998)
  - Total: 7,106
- Time zone: UTC+7 (ICT)

Sala Krau (Khmer: សាលាក្រៅ, Saléa Krau) is a district located in Pailin Province, western Cambodia. The district is subdivided into 4 communes and 43 villages. According to the 1998 census of Cambodia, it had a population of 7,106.

There is an official road international border crossing with Thailand in this district located at Phsar Prum. The border crossing is connected with Pailin by National Road 57. The checkpoint on the Thai side is called the Ban Phakkat Permanent Border Crossing (Thai: จุดผ่านแดนถาวรบ้านผักกาด) and is located in Khlong Yai sub-district, Pong Nam Ron district, Chanthaburi province.

Sangkat (Communes)	Krom (Villages)
Sala Krau	Spung, Veal, Tuol, Leav, Kuy, Ou Ressey Kroam, Kok Keo, Sre An Tak
Stueng Trang	Thnal Bat, Stueng Trang, Phnum Krenh, Ou Kunthy Dova, Baysei, Phnum Preal, Dei Saeit, Ou Doun Ta Kroam, Ou Don Ta Loeu, Prey Chun Teas, Phteas Sbouv (Phteah sbov), Koun Damrei, Toul Khos, Anlong Reaksa, Tomnob, Dei Sa Thma
Stueng Kach	Kngak, Ta Ngen Kraom, Ou Beng, Bos S'am, Doung, Stueng Kach, Boeng Prolit, Sla, Rathkraoh Chheh, Tuek Chenh, Ou Ro El, Phsar Prum, Ou Chheu Kram
Ou Andoung	Thnal Totueng, Koun Phnum, Thnal Kaeng, Boeng Trakuon, O Andoang, Ou Ressey Loeu
