= Thung Kula Ronghai =

Natural region in Northeastern Thailand

Thung Kula Ronghai (Thai: ทุ่งกุลาร้องไห้, IPA: [tʰûŋ kulaː rɔ́ːŋ hâːj]) is a natural region in northeastern Thailand. Its area is around 2.1 million rai (or 3,200 km^{2}). It lies in the provinces of Surin, Maha Sarakham, Yasothon, Sisaket, and Roi Et.

== History and legend ==
Its name translates to 'fields of the crying Kula'. Legend has it that the Kula, from Mottama, Myanmar, traveled through this plateau. The Kula were known for their endurance and toughness. They spent several days traveling the region without passing any villages or finding water. The surroundings had no trees to provide shade. It was only arid land. Trekking through this area was very difficult. The dry land and scarceness of water supply exhausted the Kula and made them weep.

Historically, Thung Kula Ronghai had suffered desert-like conditions during dry season and flooding during rainy season. Soils were plagued by salinity. The area has since been reclaimed and today the region has become a well-known Hom Mali rice producing area of Thailand.

== Tung Kula Lake ==
Tung Kula Lake is an artificial lake which is also a reservoir in Surin province. The lake's surface area is around 1.2 km2.
