= Voat Ko =

Voat Ko ឃុំវត្តគរ
- Commune
- Location within Cambodia
- Coordinates: 13°05′N 103°12′E
- Country: Cambodia
- Province: Battambang Province
- District: Battambang District
- Villages: 6
- Time zone: UTC+07

Voat Ko (Note: Khmer: ឃុំវត្តគរ; Khŭm Voăt Kô, [ʋŏət kɔː]) is a khum (commune) of Battambang District in Battambang Province in north-western Cambodia. It is the birthplace of Nuon Chea, one of the leaders of the Khmer Rouge.

== Villages ==
- Voat Ko
- Chrap Krasang
- Ballang
- Khsach Poy
- Damnak Luong
- Kampong Seima
