= Ban Sreymom =

Cambodian politician (born 1975)

- បាន ស្រីមុំ

Governor of the Pailin province
- Incumbent
- Assumed office 18 December 2020
- Monarch: Norodom Sihamoni
- Prime Minister: Hun Sen; Hun Manet
- Preceded by: Phan Chanthul

Personal details
- Born: 1975 (age 50–51)
- Party: Cambodian People's Party
- Spouse: Y Chhean

Ban Sreymom (Khmer: បាន ស្រីមុំ; born 1975) is a Cambodian politician. She has been serving as the Governor of the Pailin province since 2020, and was the second woman governor of a Cambodian province after Mithuna Phuthong. Ban previously served as member of the National Assembly between 2013 and 2020.

== Career ==
Ban was born in 1975. She first became involved in politics, at least as far as the 2003 local elections in Pailin province, and joined the Cambodian People's Party.

Once in Pailin, Ban opened a karaoke bar which went on to become the largest in the region and was a regular haunt for senior provincial officials. She later became president of the Cambodian Red Cross in the province, succeeding Ieng Sary’s daughter. In 2006, she and her husband were embroiled in controversial land seizures.

Between 2013 and 2020 Ban served as member of the National Assembly for Pailin province. She served as vice-chair of the Committees on Human Rights, Petitions, Investigation and Relations with the Senate, as well as the Committee on Education, Youth, Sport, Worship, Religious Affairs, Culture and Tourism. She also led the Union of Youth Federations of Cambodia in Pailin.

On 18 December 2020, Ban was appointed by royal decree as governor of Pailin Province to replace Phan Chanthul, becoming the second female provincial governor after Mithuna Phuthong. She resigned from the National Assembly at the end of 2020. At her inauguration, she pledged to work towards the recovery of the province following the impact of the COVID-19 pandemic.

== Personal life ==
Ban married Y Chhean, whom she met at her karaoke bar and also served as Pailin governor.
