= Riceberry =

Variety of rice

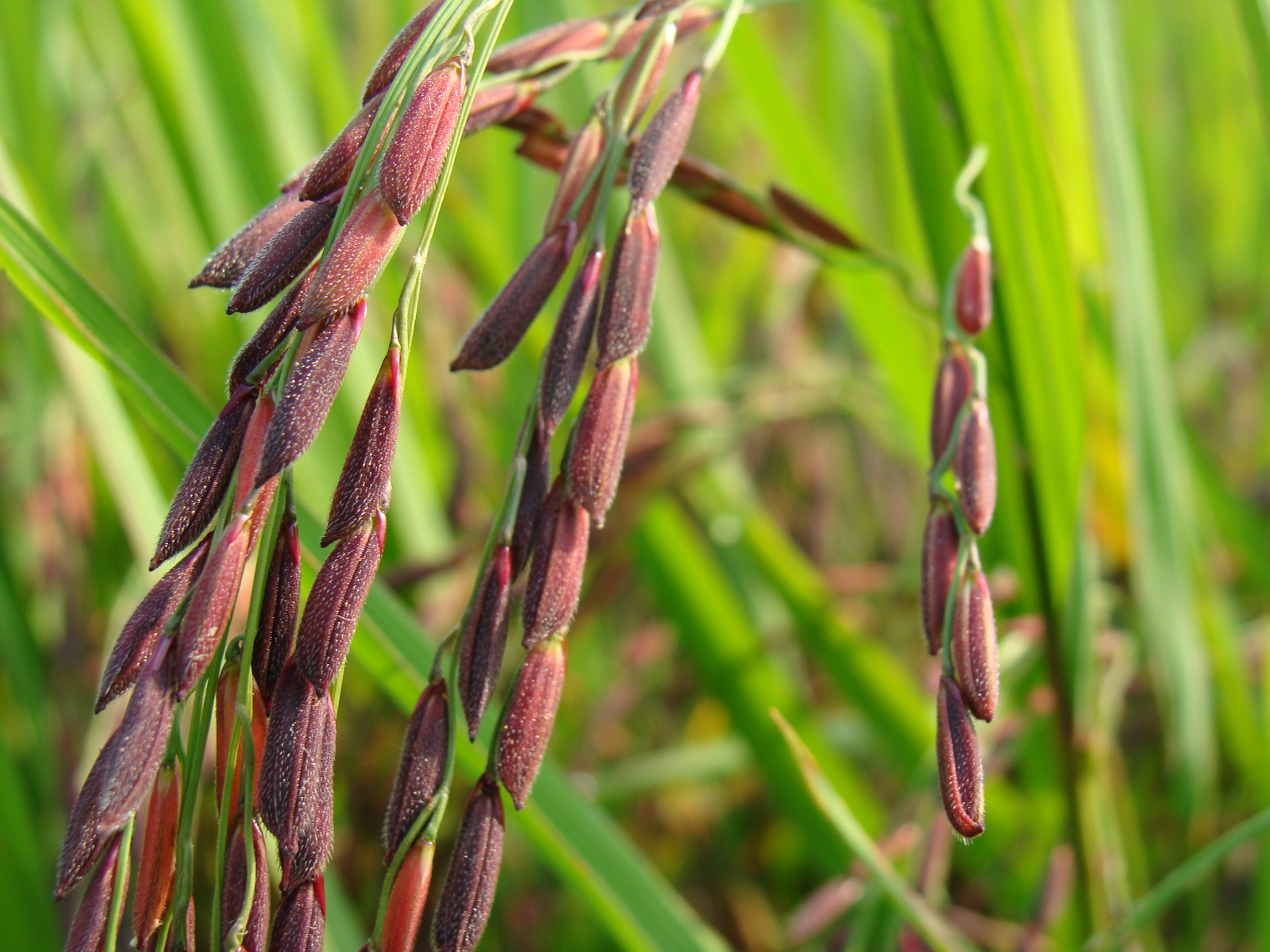
Riceberry

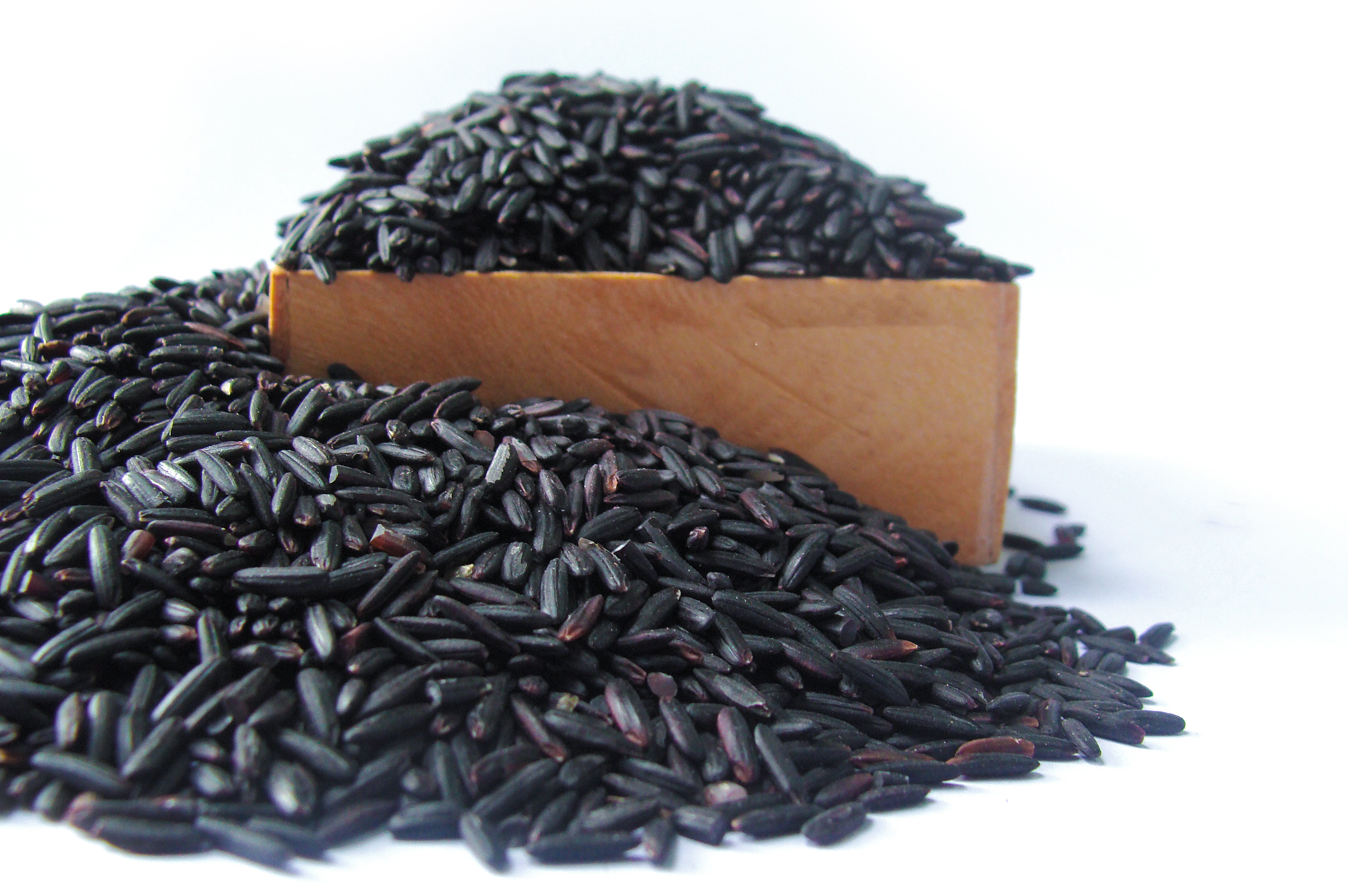
Whole grain riceberry

Riceberry (Thai: ข้าวไรซ์เบอร์รี่) is a rice variety from Thailand, a cross-breed of kao-jao hom nin (a local non-glutinous purple rice) and hom mali rice. The variety was created in 2002 by the Rice Science Center, Kasetsart University's Kamphaeng Saen Campus in Nakhon Pathom, Thailand. The outcome is a soft, deep purple whole grain rice.

Riceberry is grown primarily in northern and northeastern Thailand. The wet season months of August through December are suitable for riceberry planting.

== Characteristics ==
Characteristics	
Plant height	105–110 cm (41–43 in)
Days to maturity	130
Yield	1,875–3,125 kg/ha (1,673–2,788 lb/acre)
Grain length (brown rice)	7.2 millimetres (9/32 in)
Grain length-width ratio	>3.0
Pericarp color	deep purple
Head rice (%)	50
Amylose content (%)	15.6
Gel temperature	< 70 °C (158 °F)

== Governmental support ==
The Thailand Commerce Ministry aims to increase riceberry cultivation from 5,000 rai to 20,000 rai (3,200 hectares) by 2018 to address in the world market demand for organic brown rice. The yield from 5,000 rai amounts to only 1,500 tonnes, which is around half the national average. Demand for premium organic rice is still small, accounting for only one to two percent of total rice exports, but as riceberry sells for two or three times the price of white rice, it has the potential to increase farming incomes. As of 2015 Riceberry sold in the domestic market for about 50 baht a kilogram, while the export price was 200 baht per kilogram.
