= Pailin municipality =

Pailin municipality ក្រុងប៉ៃលិន
- City Municipality
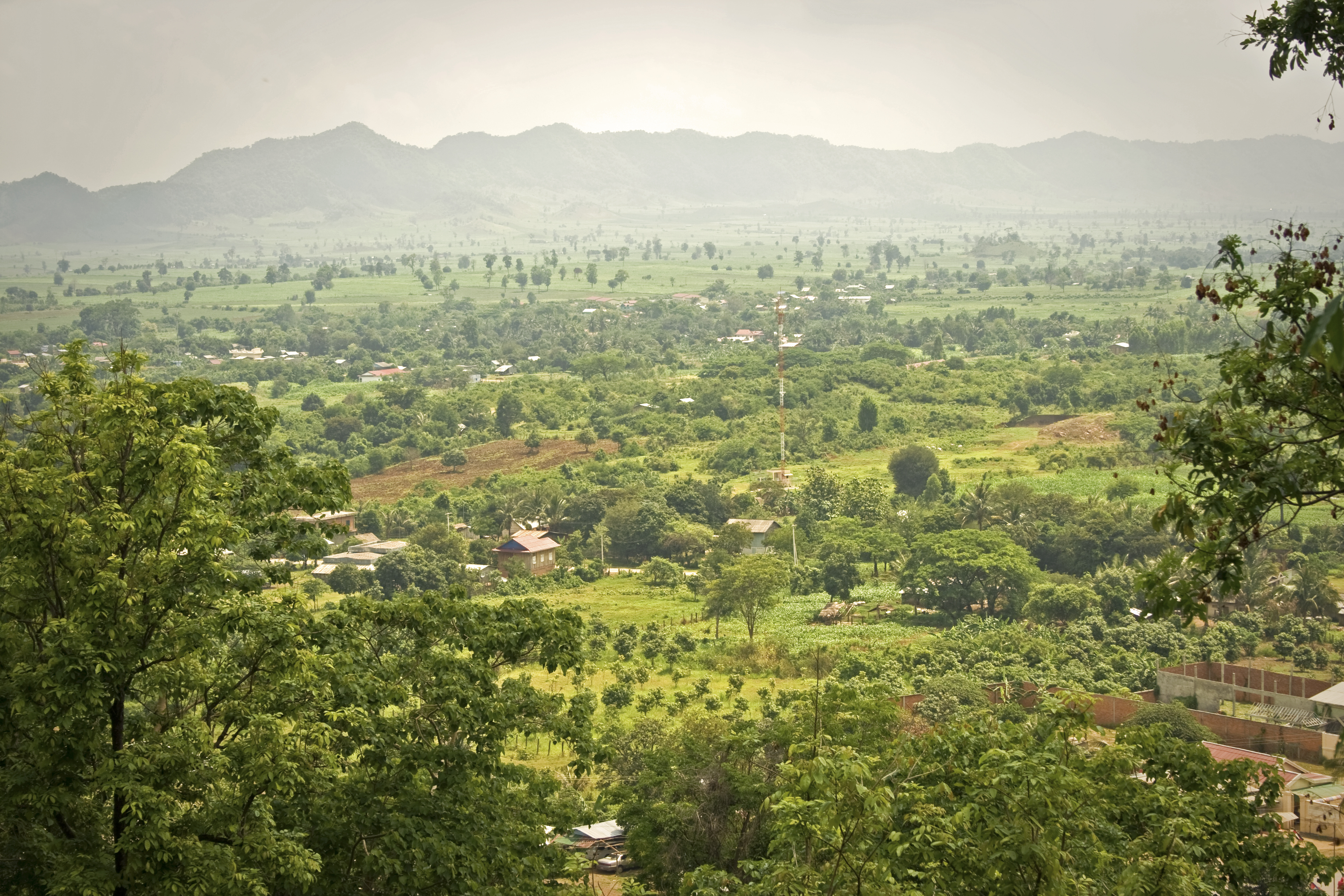
- Outskirts of Pailin City as viewed from Phnom Yat, 2011

- Pailin Municipality (red) within Pailin Province

- Location in Cambodia
- Coordinates: 12°51′16″N 102°36′23″E
- Country: Cambodia
- Province: Pailin

Government
  - Type: City Municipality

Area
  - Total: 575 km^{2} (222 sq mi)

Population (2019)
  - Total: 37,393
- Time zone: UTC+7 (ICT)

Pailin municipality (Khmer: ក្រុងប៉ៃលិន) is a municipality (krong) covering the southern part of Pailin province in north-western Cambodia on the border with Thailand. The municipality is subdivided into 4 communes (sangkat) and 36 villages (phum). According to the 1998 and 2008 census of Cambodia, the 575 km2 city had a population of 15,800 and 36,354 respectively.

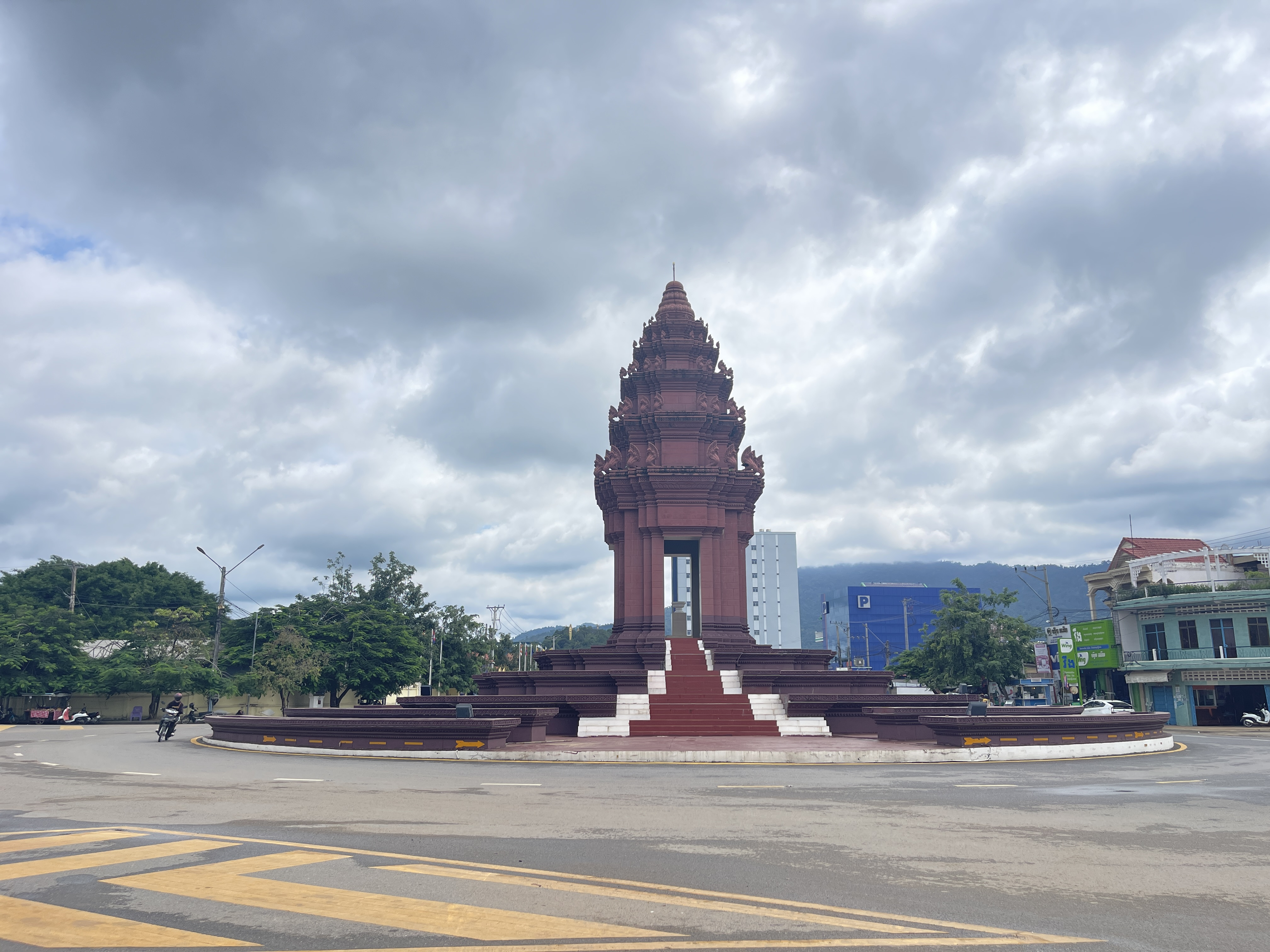
Independence Monument (Pailin)

== History ==
Pailin City was founded under the Khmer Empire, where it was an important trading centre. It continued to be an important centre for commerce during French colonial control, where several French-owned businesses and plantations were established. During the late 1800s, the area saw an influx of migrants from Burma who became the Kula people of the Pailin-Chanthaburi region. In 1922, the Kula people established a pagoda on top of the 60 metres (200 ft) tall Phnom Yat.

=== During the Cambodian Conflict ===
After the Vietnamese invasion of Cambodia and the flight of the Khmer Rouge government from Phnom Penh, the municipality and wider province was occupied by the remaining forces of the Khmer Rouge under the Provisional Government of National Union and National Salvation of Cambodia and its predecessors.

Since 1979, the urban centre of Pailin has been abandoned due to the war. In July 1989, Khmer Rouge forces began attacking the area. In September 1989, Vietnam began withdrawing its forces from Cambodia. Meanwhile, Khmer Rouge forces increased engagements against the Vietnamese-backed State of Cambodia over control of Pailin City and surrounding ruby and sapphire mines. Beginning on 17 September, the Khmer Rouge began launching 800 to 2,000 shells per day onto Pailin, and according to Deputy Defence Minister Ke Kim Yan, the shells were being fired from Khmer Rouge positions in Thailand. On 23 September, Defense Minister Tea Banh acknowledged the Khmer Rouge's capture of land around Pailin in the government's first admission of losing territory in the war.

==== Under Khmer Rouge control ====
During the 1980s and 1990s, Pailin municipality served as a stronghold and resource centre for the Khmer Rouge. In particular, the municipality served as source of gems and logging which financed guerrilla fighters. Gems such as rubies, sapphires, and amethysts allowed Khmer Rouge guerrilla fighters to finance themselves.

The ruby mining workforce numbered in the thousands and consisted mostly Thai and Burmese miners. The conditions for the miners were tough, with frequent cases of malaria and typhoid among themselves. For them to work on 1 cubic yard (0.76 m^{3}), each miner required a license issued by the Khmer Rouge costing ฿6,000 (US$240 in 1990). The rubies were then traded to makeshift markets on the other side of the border in Bo Rai district in Thailand, earning the Khmer Rouge around a million dollars per month. According to the Los Angeles Times in 1990, there was an estimated 15-year supply of rubies left in Pailin.

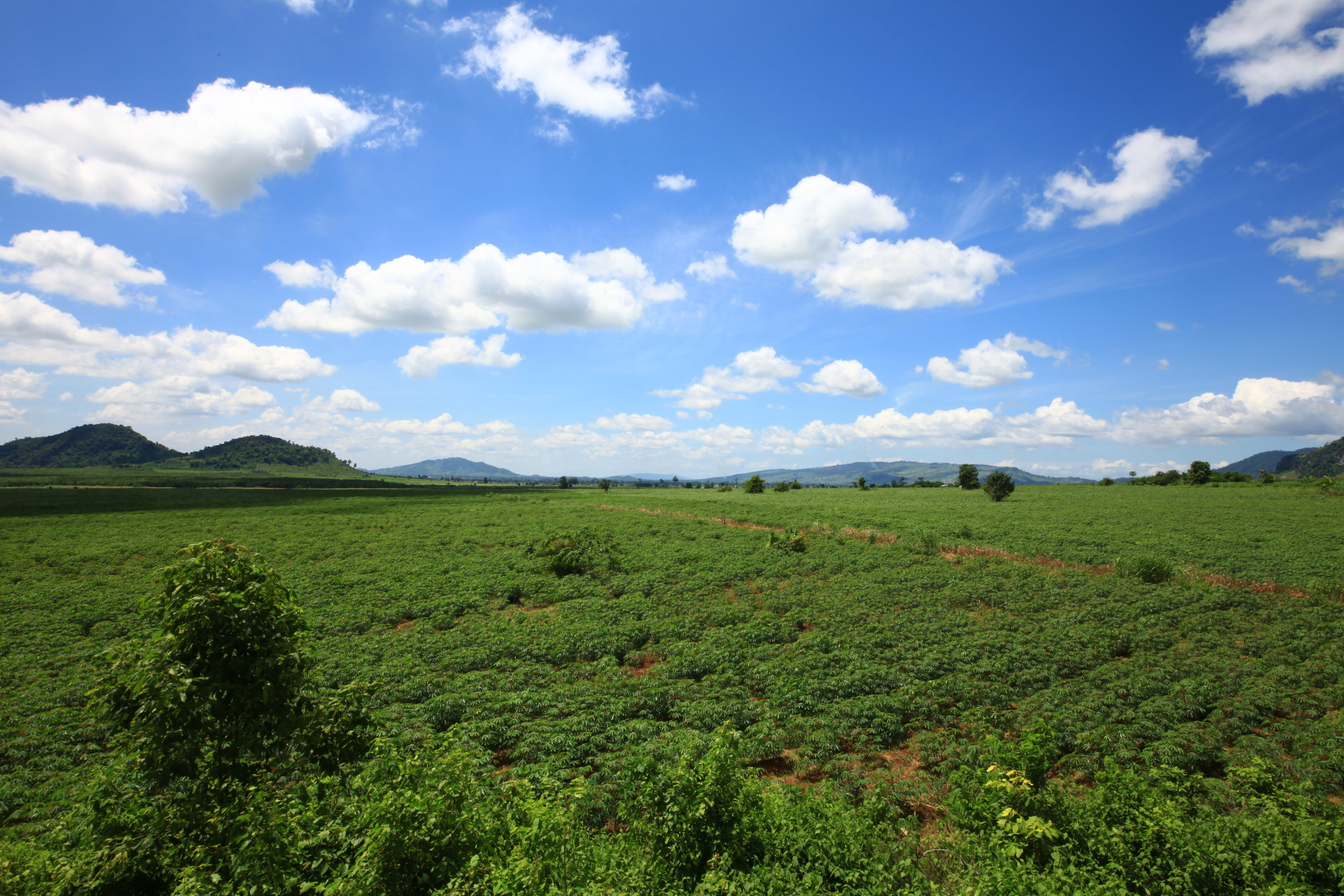
Cassava plantation with the Cardamom Mountains in the background

Under Khmer Rouge control, the area was ruled with little freedoms and under strict control. Khmer Rouge authorities also discouraged religion among the population. According to Human Rights Watch, the Khmer Rouge established a re-education camp for civilian administrators near Pailin City in the early 1990s. The 1994 rice harvest in Pailin was disastrous due to flooding, deforestation, and placer mining.

In early 1994, the new monarchist government in Phnom Penh launched its 1994 dry season offensives. The offensive aimed at taking Pailin began on 17 March and consisted of 7,000 soldiers. During the push along Route 10, many villages and homes were pillaged by government forces. On 19 March, government forces retook Pailin while Khmer Rouge forces dispersed into surrounding areas. The offensive caused the exodus of 25,000 to 30,000 civilians into Thailand, who were later denied access and sent back to Pailin. However, government control over Pailin was short, and on 19 April the Khmer Rouge recaptured the city with 3,000 troops. By May, the frontlines returned to what they were before the offensive. The loss of Pailin initiated King Sihanouk to propose peace talks between the government and Khmer Rouge, which failed.

== Climate ==
Climate data for Pailin (1982–2024)
Month	Jan	Feb	Mar	Apr	May	Jun	Jul	Aug	Sep	Oct	Nov	Dec	Year
Mean daily maximum °C (°F)	31.0 (87.8)	31.3 (88.3)	32.9 (91.2)	33.4 (92.1)	33.5 (92.3)	33.7 (92.7)	33.6 (92.5)	33.3 (91.9)	32.9 (91.2)	31.7 (89.1)	30.4 (86.7)	29.9 (85.8)	32.3 (90.1)
Mean daily minimum °C (°F)	21.0 (69.8)	21.9 (71.4)	23.0 (73.4)	23.1 (73.6)	24.2 (75.6)	24.5 (76.1)	24.4 (75.9)	23.7 (74.7)	22.3 (72.1)	21.6 (70.9)	21.5 (70.7)	20.4 (68.7)	22.6 (72.7)
Average precipitation mm (inches)	11.7 (0.46)	32.4 (1.28)	86.4 (3.40)	139.2 (5.48)	199.3 (7.85)	201.6 (7.94)	245.1 (9.65)	292.4 (11.51)	342.1 (13.47)	296.5 (11.67)	176.3 (6.94)	10.9 (0.43)	2,033.9 (80.08)
Source: World Meteorological Organization

== Administration ==
Communes (sangkat)	Villages (phum)
Pailin	Ou Tapuk Loeu, O Ta Prang, Sound Am Pao Khang Lech, Suon Ampov Khang Koet, Wat, Toek Thla, Ta Gen Loeu, Ba Den Neiv, Toul Kheiv, Pa Hi Tboang, Pa Hi Choeng
Ou Ta Vau	Khlong, Koun Phnum, Ou Tavau, Kbal Pralean, Die Kra Hom, Kra Chab, Ou Process
Tuol Lvea	Tuol Lvea, Chamkar Kaphe, Ou Chra Kandal, Ou Chra Khang Kaeut, Ou Chra Leu, Ou Ta Puk Kraom, Ou Peut, Tuol Sralau, Tuol Nimit, Viel Vong, Thmey
Bar Yakha	Ou Chra Lech, Ou Snguot, Roung Chak Tuek Kak, Ba Yakha, Ba Tangsu, Bahuy Khmaer Cheung, Bahuy Khmaer Tboung
