= Jasmine rice =

Thai rice variety

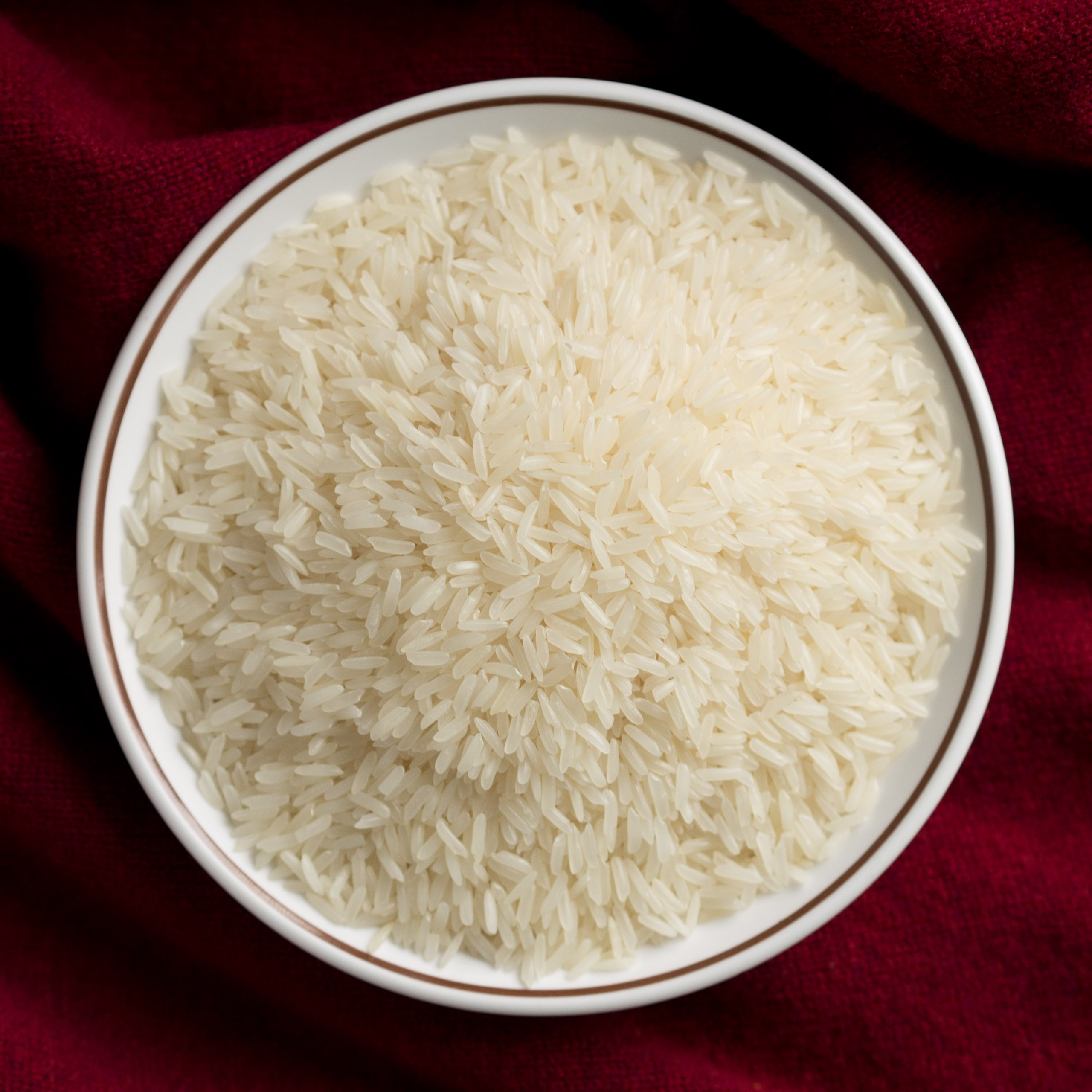
- Close-up of uncooked grains
- Species: Oryza sativa
- Cultivar group: Jasmine
- Cultivar: Hom Mali (Thailand), Phka Rumduol (Cambodia), ST25 (Vietnam), and others
- Origin: Thailand

Jasmine rice (Thai: ข้าวหอมมะลิ; RTGS: Khao hom mali; Thai pronunciation: [kʰâːw hɔ̌ːm malíʔ]) is a long-grain variety of fragrant or aromatic rice. Its fragrance, reminiscent of pandan (Pandanus amaryllifolius) and popcorn, results from the rice plant's natural production of aroma compounds, of which 2-acetyl-1-pyrroline is the most salient. A rapid loss of aromatic intensity leads many Southeast Asians and connoisseurs to prefer each year's freshly harvested "new crop" of jasmine rice. Jasmine rice is a member of the species Oryza sativa.

Jasmine rice is grown primarily in Thailand (Thai hom mali or Thai fragrant rice), Cambodia (phka rumduol or Cambodian jasmine rice), Laos, and southern Vietnam. It is moist and soft in texture when cooked, with a slightly sweet flavor. The grains cling and are somewhat sticky when cooked, though less sticky than sticky or glutinous rice (Oryza sativa var. glutinosa), as it has less amylopectin. It is about three times as sticky as American long-grain rice.

To harvest jasmine rice, the long stalks are cut and threshed. The rice can then be left in a hulled form called paddy rice, de-hulled to produce brown rice, or milled to remove the germ and some or all of the bran, producing white rice.

Jasmine rice is not directly related to the shrub of the same name.

== Origin ==
The origin of jasmine rice can be traced to Ban Laem Pradu in Phanat Nikhom District, Chonburi Province where the original Khao Dawk (Note: 'Dawk' and 'Dok' are alternative spellings of the same Thai word, which is pronounced similarly. 'Dawk' is more commonly used than 'Dok' and both mean 'flower' in Thai.) Mali rice was discovered. The rice sample, known as "Sample 105," was selected for its slender, jasmine-white long grain and natural fragrance similar to pandanus leaf and was brought to Bang Khla District, Chachoengsao Province in mid-1940s to early 1950s. Eventually, the rice was officially named Khao Dawk Mali 105 (Thai: ข้าวดอกมะลิ 105, lit. 'Jasmine flower rice 105'), which is often shortened to "Khao Hom Mali" (Thai: ข้าวหอมมะลิ, lit. 'Jasmine rice') or simply "Hom Mali" (Thai: หอมมะลิ, lit. 'Fragrant jasmine'), and is now grown primarily in the Northeast region of Thailand, specifically in Thung Kula Rong Hai.

== Types ==
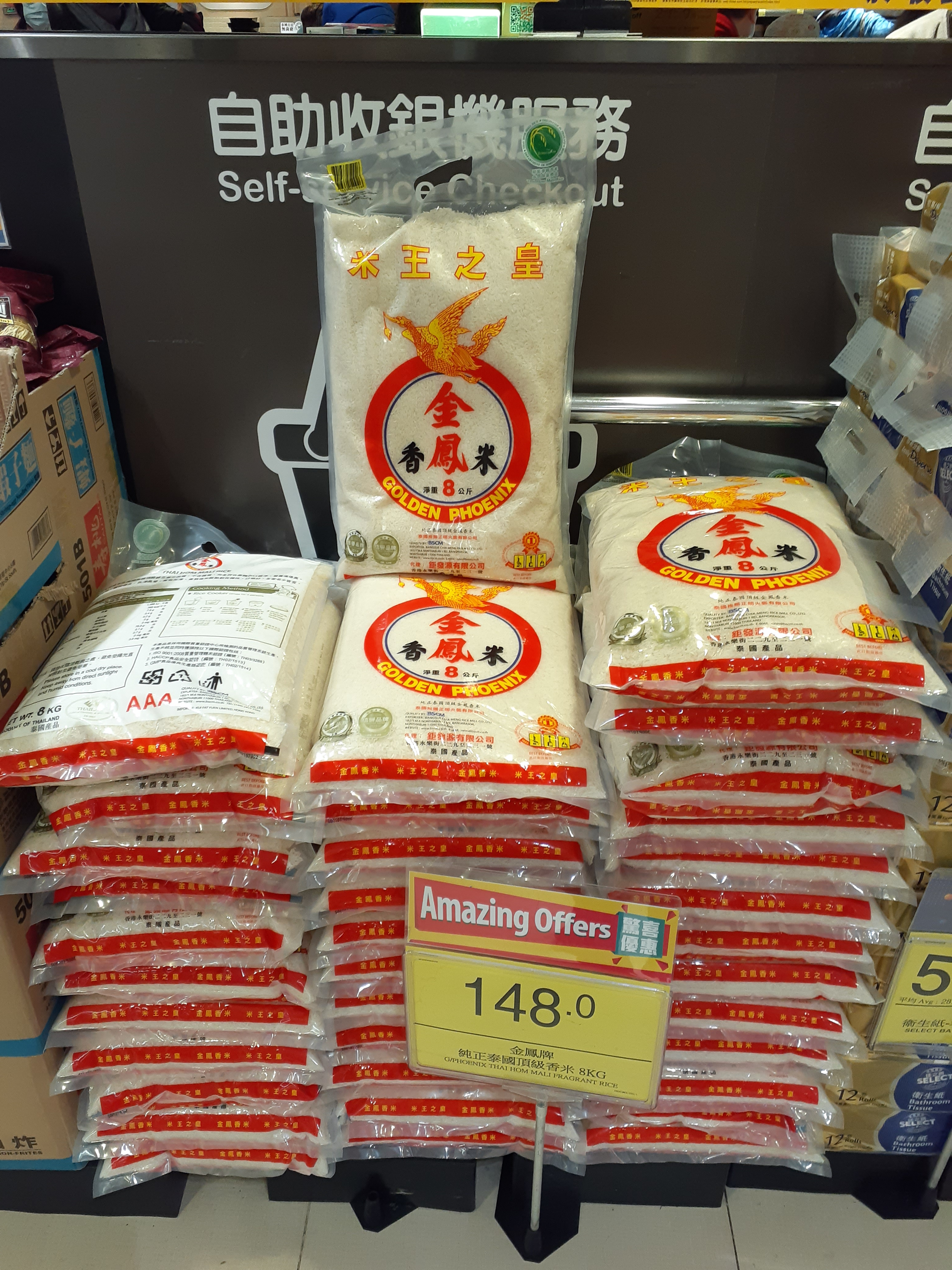
Thai Hom Mali rice (with the green seal from the Thai Department of Foreign Trade) on sale at a supermarket in Hong Kong

Thai jasmine rice and Cambodian rice share many of the same characteristics and grow mainly in neighboring geographic areas on opposite sides of the northeastern Thai-Cambodian border. Cambodian jasmine rice is cultivated in Cambodia and processed as white (milled and polished) and brown rice. Distinct Cambodian jasmine rice varieties include these three, phka rumduol, phka romeat, and phka rumdeng. Recent DNA fingerprint analysis, carried out with 18 markers, shows that all three varieties possess 18 known fragrance alleles. Two varietals (phka rumduol and phka rumdeng) are distinctly Cambodian with 17 markers in identical positions, with Thai jasmine rice and one fragrance marker each in a different position. The analysis of Cambodian phka romeat shows all 18 markers in identical positions with the trademarked Thai jasmine rice Thai hom mali.

Jasmine rice, though grown in Laos and southern Vietnam (in the Mekong Delta), is not the predominant rice variety in these regions. Glutinous rice is more common in Laos, while regular Oryza sativa predominates in Vietnam.

Thai jasmine rice from Thailand has a slender shape. The two types of Thai jasmine rice are white and brown. The vast majority of jasmine rice exported overseas to Singapore, Hong Kong, North America, and Europe is Thai jasmine rice, with a small minority from Vietnam. In Thailand it is thought that only Surin, Buriram, and Sisaket Provinces can produce high quality hom mali.

=== White jasmine rice ===
White rice is often preferred for taste, texture, and ease of digestion. When cooked, white jasmine rice has a dry texture. The aroma is caused by the evaporation of 2-acetyl-1-pyrroline.

=== Brown jasmine rice ===
Brown jasmine rice retains the light tan outer layer on the rice grain. It has greater health benefits than white jasmine rice because it still has the bran. Brown jasmine rice has a flavor like oats and contains gamma oryzanol which can decrease cholesterol in blood vessels. Brown jasmine rice has vitamins such as vitamin A, vitamin B, and beta-carotene and it contains antioxidants which support the working of the nervous system.

=== Glycemic index ===
Jasmine rice has a glycemic index of 68–80. Foods with a glycemic index of 55 or lower are preferred in the diet of diabetics due to their slower absorption which prevents large spikes in blood sugar after consumption. Not all rice has a high glycemic index. Basmati rice, for example, has a relatively low glycemic index of 59. However, it is uncommon for rice to be eaten alone. It is usually eaten with other foods that can reduce its glycemic index by 20–40 percent.

== Culinary uses ==
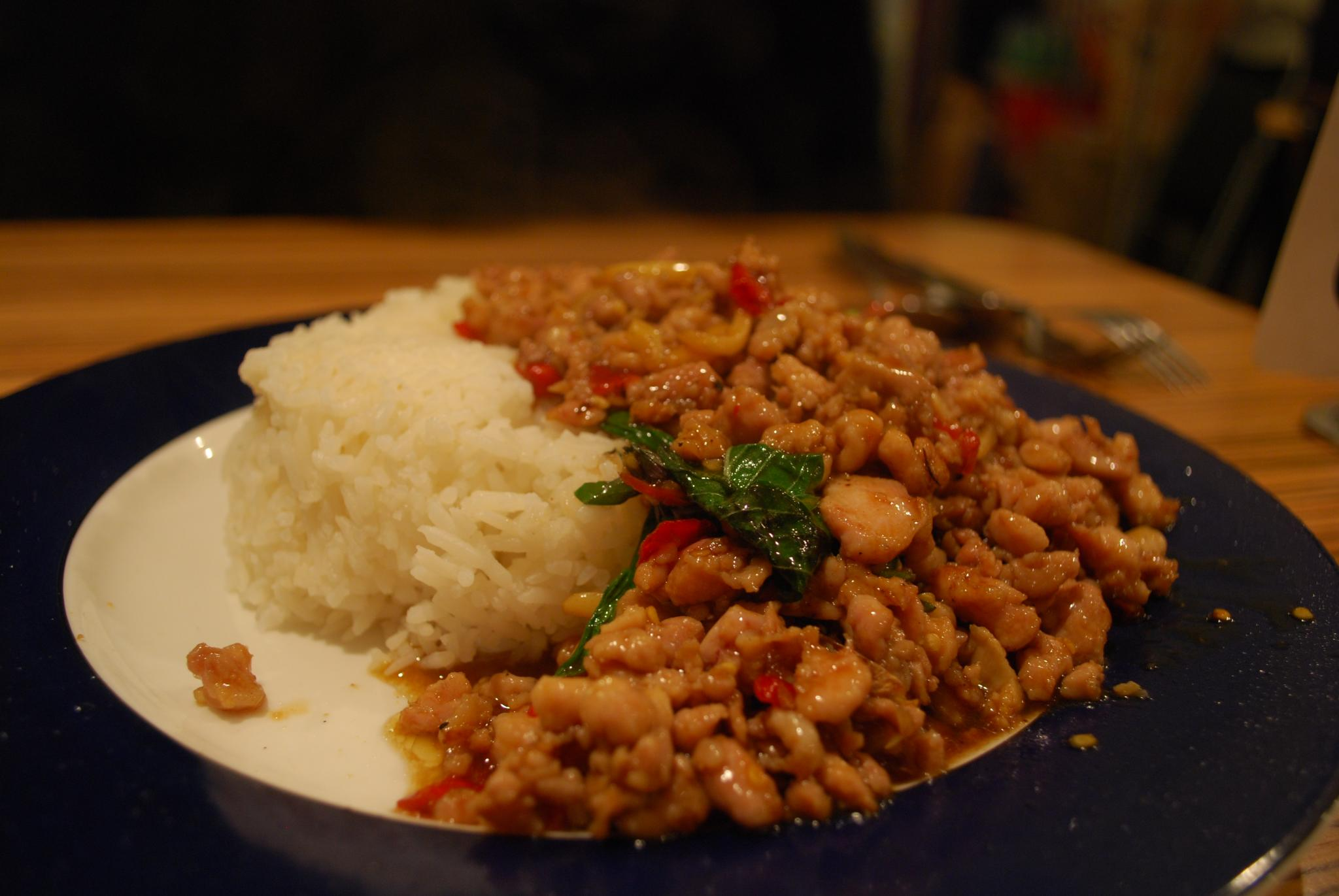
Steamed jasmine rice with holy basil and chicken stir fry

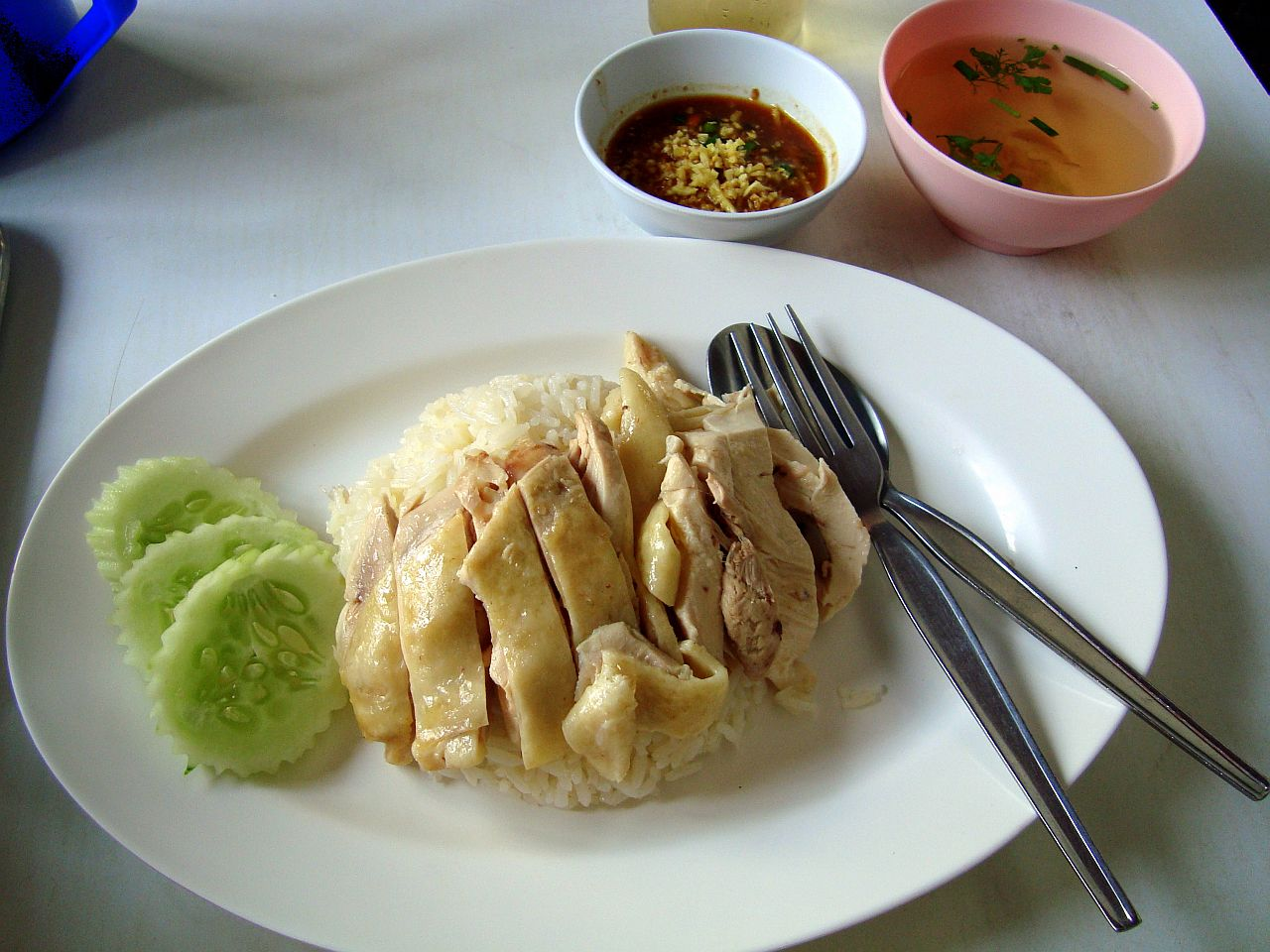
Thai style khao man gai (Hainanese Chicken Rice)

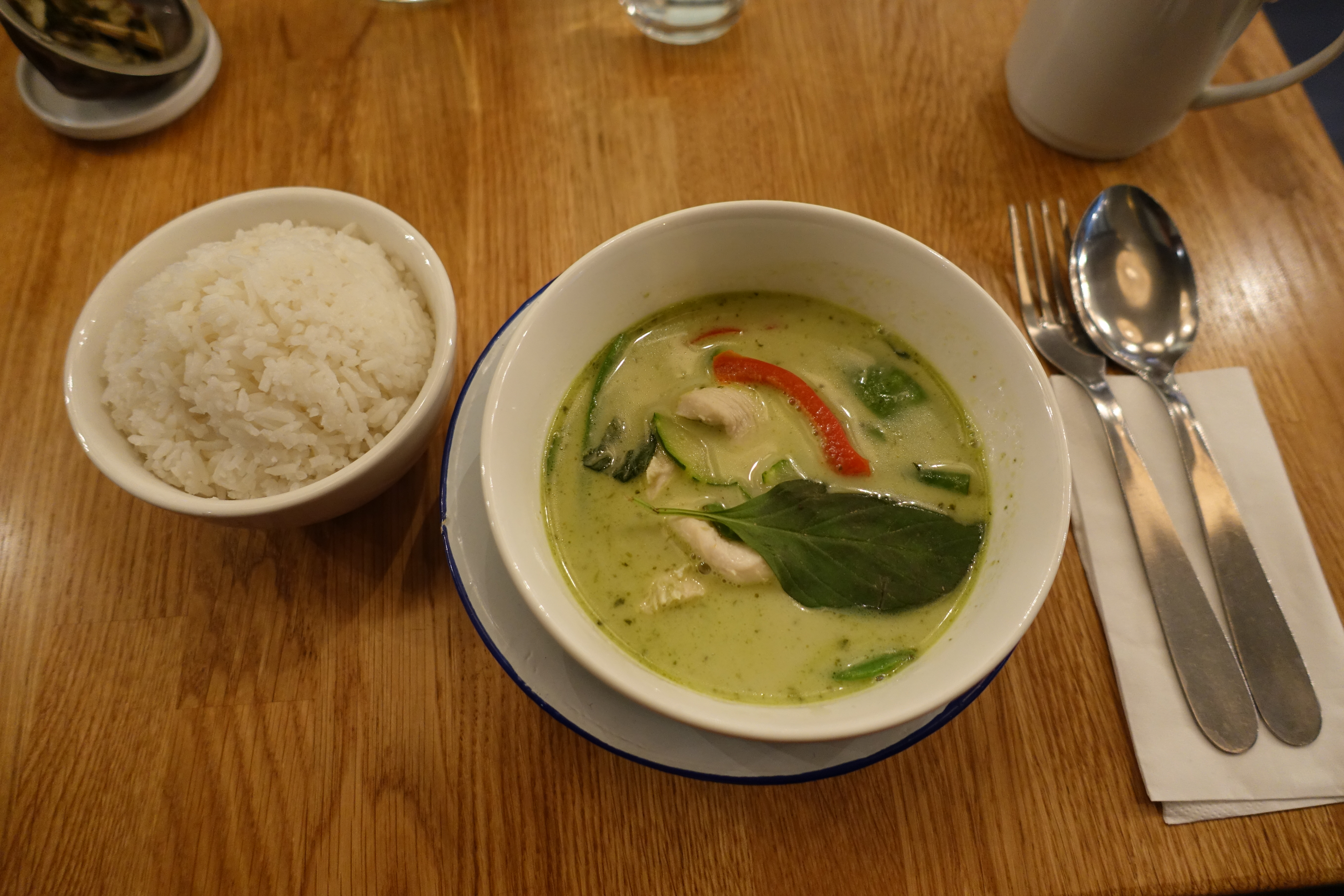
Thai green curry with a side of jasmine rice

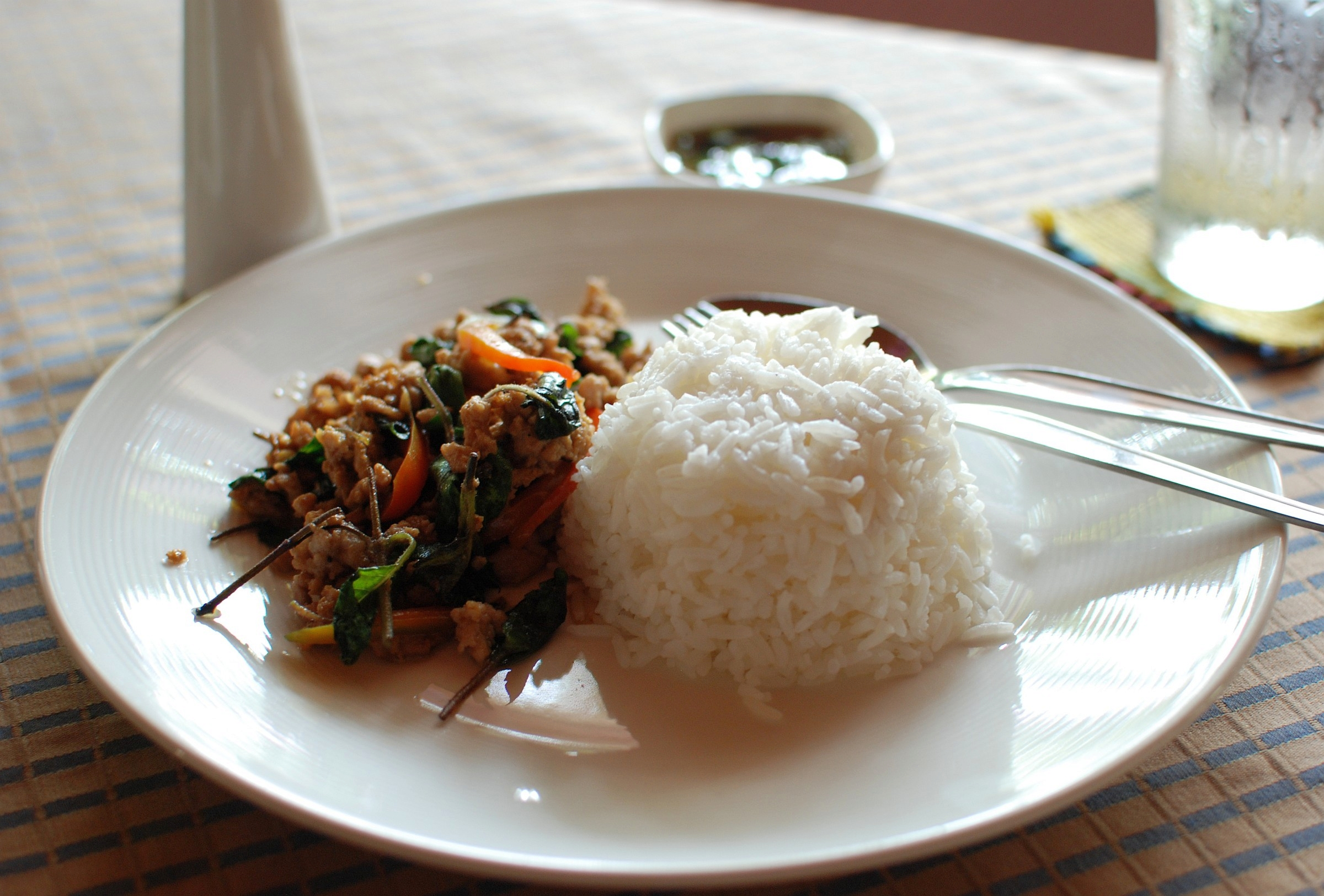
Thai phat kaphrao

Steamed jasmine rice is ideal for eating with stir fries, with grilled, fried, or braised food items, and in soups (when cooked slightly drier by adding a little less water during cooking).

Jasmine rice is frequently served at Thai, Vietnamese, and Cambodian restaurants worldwide. But it is not the rice traditionally used in Indian, Chinese, or European dishes.

== Recognition ==
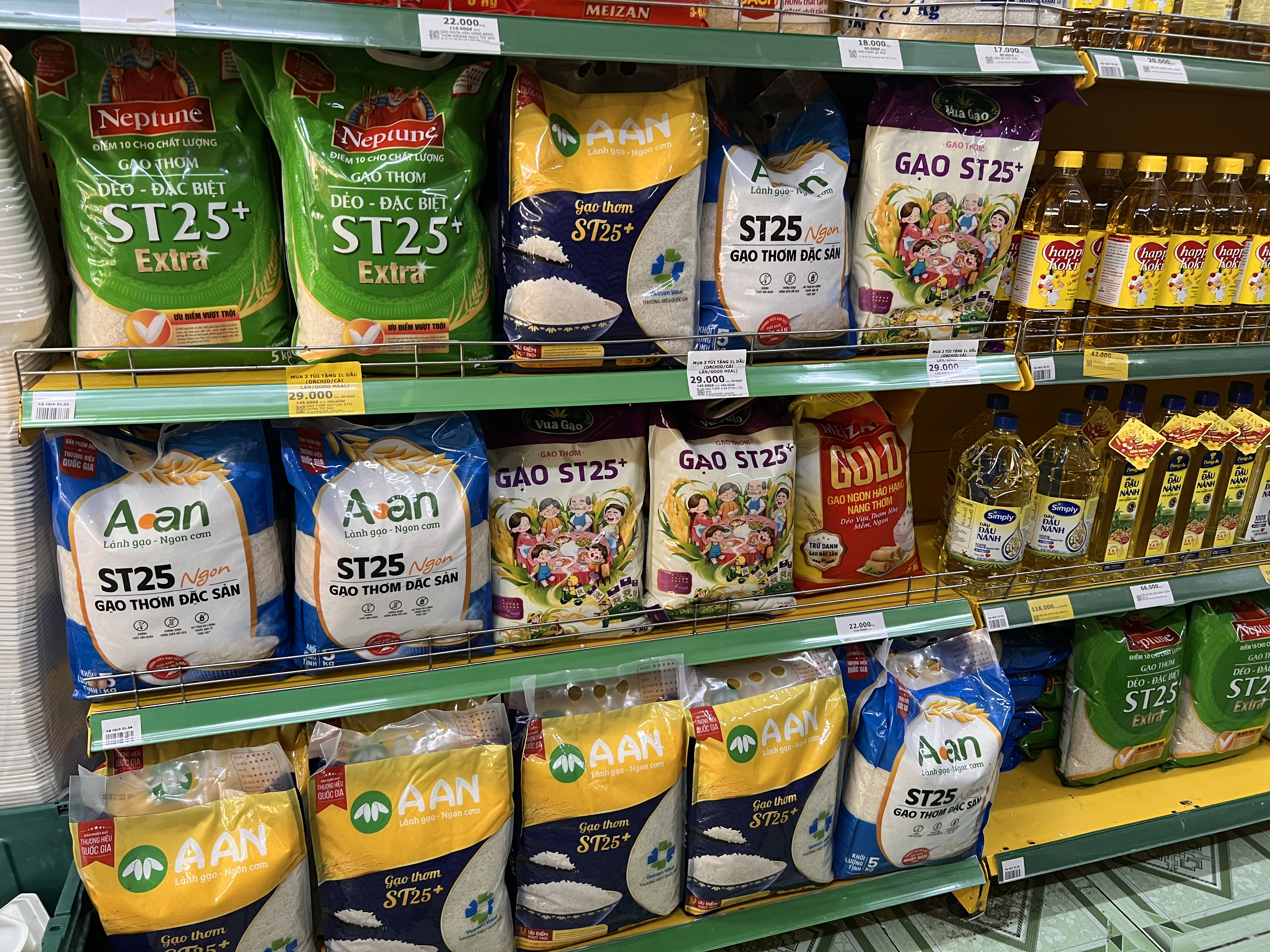
ST25 rice bags on sale at a Vietnamese grocery store

At the 2017 World Rice Conference held in Macau, Thailand's hom mali 105 (jasmine) rice was declared the world's best rice, beating 21 competitors. Thailand had entered three rice varieties in the competition. This marked the fifth time in the prior nine years that Thai jasmine rice has won the honor. The judges of the competition were chefs from Macau restaurants. Criteria were taste and the shape of the rice grains. Cambodia finished second, Vietnam third.

More recently, on 17 November 2022, the Phka Rumduol jasmine variety of rice from Cambodia was crowned the World’s Best Rice for the fifth time at the TRT (The Rice Trader) World Rice Conference which took place in Phuket, Thailand. In 2025, Phka Rumduol and ST25 from Vietnam shared this top honor.

In September 2026, jasmine rice became popular in the US, with North America ranking as the 2nd largest global market for the variety, accounting for 35% of the market share.

== See also ==
- Ambemohar rice, a short-grain aromatic variety from India
- Basmati rice, a long-grain aromatic variety from India and Pakistan
- Riceberry, a Thai rice variety that is a hybrid of Jao Hom Nin and Khao Dok Mali 105
- List of rice varieties
- Thung Kula Ronghai, a well-known Thai Hom Mali growing region
- Jasmine, a genus of flowering plants
