= Pailin province =

Province of Cambodia

Pailin Province ខេត្តប៉ៃលិន
- Province

Khmer transcription(s)
  - Khmer: ខេត្តប៉ៃលិន
  - UNGEGN: Khaet Pailĭn
  - ALA-LC: Khett P″aiin
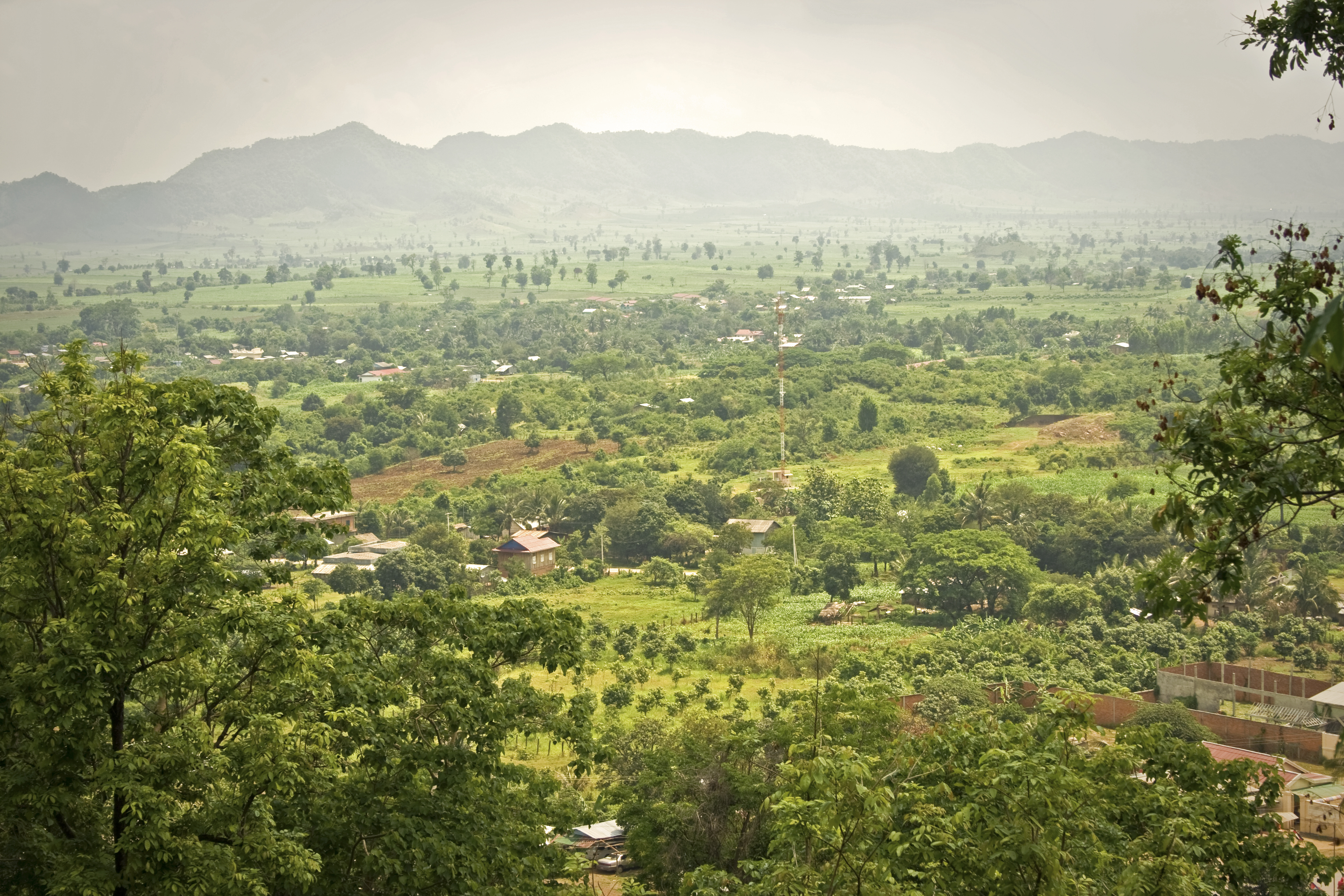
- Pailin countryside from Phnom Yat

- Seal

- Map of Cambodia highlighting Pailin
- Coordinates: 12°51′02″N 102°36′34″E
- Country: Cambodia
- Founded: 1909
- City–municipality: 31 July 1997
- Province: 22 December 2008
- Capital: Pailin
- Subdivisions: 1 municipality; 1 district

Government
  - Governor: Ban Sreymom (CPP)
  - National Assembly: 1 / 125

Area
  - Total: 803 km^{2} (310 sq mi)
  - Rank: 23rd

Population (2024)
  - Total: ▼79,445
  - Rank: 24th
  - Density: 94/km^{2} (240/sq mi)
  - Rank: 15th
- Time zone: UTC+07:00 (ICT)
- Dialing code: +855
- ISO 3166 code: KH-24
- Website: www.pailin.gov.kh

Pailin Province (Khmer: ខេត្តប៉ៃលិន, Khaet Pailĭn, Khmer pronunciation: [paj lɨn]; lit. 'blue sapphire') is a province in western Cambodia at the northern edge of the Cardamom Mountains near the border of Thailand. This province is surrounded by Battambang province and was officially carved out of Battambang to become a separate administrative division after the surrender of the Ieng Sary faction of the Khmer Rouge in 1996. Pailin is known to much of the world for having long been a stronghold of the Khmer Rouge, remaining under their control long after they were defeated in 1979 and serving from 1994 to 1998 as the capital of the Provisional Government of National Union and National Salvation of Cambodia. Within Cambodia, Pailin is known for its natural resources, namely precious gems and timber.

Once a part of the powerful Khmer Empire, Pailin was conquered in 1558 by the Burmese under Bayinnaung and later ruled by the Siamese (Thai) until 1907 and from 1941 to 1946, when it was returned to Cambodia. It was known to the Thai as "Phailin" (Thai: ไพลิน, Thai pronunciation: [pʰāj.lin]). There is still a vibrant border crossing point in Pailin. On 22 December 2008, King Norodom Sihamoni signed a Royal Decree that changed the municipalities of Kep, Pailin, and Sihanoukville into provinces, as well as adjusting several provincial borders.

== History ==
Pailin was founded during the Khmer Empire, where it existed as an important trading center. It continued its role as a center of trade and commerce under French colonial rule, which saw the establishment of French-operated stores and plantations. Between the late 19th century to the early 20th century, the area saw an influx of multi-ethnic Burmese immigrants from Mogok and other areas of Burma who became collectively known as the Kula people. The Kula settled around Pailin and built various structures based on traditional Burmese architecture. In the 1870s, various sapphire and ruby veins in the area began to be discovered. The reason for Burmese attraction to the area was due to the alkali basalt volcanic origins of Pailin's Phnom Yat deposit which mirrored that of Mogok's gem fields. Archival collections had stated that the Kula elite had created a "state within a state" by the 1890s; instead of relying on subsistence agriculture, Pailin's miners had imported products from abroad.

Under Siamese rule, Pailin's gem industry was exploited on a major scale. The Siam Exploring Company reported that monopoly extraction rights were given to British firms and subcontracted to Burmese operators such as Maung Soy. According to a scientific study done by the Gemological Institute of America (GIA), around 90% of the world's fine sapphire productions were from Pailin until the area's transfer to French Indochina. Up until the early 1970s, Pailin was a prosperous region stemming from its extensive gem deposits. During that time it was one of the most popular destinations for tourists and businessmen from around Cambodia.

=== Cambodian Conflict ===
Due to its resources, it was one of the first areas sought after by the Khmer Rouge when they began their major offensive against the Khmer Republic government. Pailin remained one of the last major strongholds of the Khmer Republic government extending a few days past the Fall of Phnom Penh. Some residents had taken to this window to flee Cambodia due to Pailin's proximity to the Thai border after hearing of the Khmer Rouge's actions from refugees escaping other cities. Pailin was captured by the Khmer Rouge on April 20, 1975 with little to no resistance since Khmer Republic soldiers had departed the city. In only a few days, residents were rounded up for a forced march to the countryside to work in rice paddies. Those believed to have connections to the government were killed. The Khmer Rouge used proceeds from mining in the Pailin area to fund their offensive and later their government once they gained national power. When the invading People's Army of Vietnam ousted them from power, they retreated to Pailin, where many former Khmer Rouge leaders remain today. It was the capital of the Provisional Government of National Union and National Salvation of Cambodia.

=== Post-Khmer Rouge ===
Some leaders went into hiding in fear of punishment for their crimes, although other leaders lived openly in the province. As of September 2007, Pailin's remaining Khmer Rouge leaders were being rounded up to face justice by an international tribunal, including Khieu Samphan and Nuon Chea.

Since the war, Pailin had suffered an economic decline and failures of local businesses. However, the now politically stable area is seeing a new wave of tourism focused on its ancient temples, natural forests, and wildlife, and especially its gem markets.

== Government ==
In 1909, the French colonial administration established Pailin as a district. During the Sangkum Reastr Niyum, Sihanouk's government established Pailin as a sub-province. Under the Khmer Republic, Pailin was divided into four districts: Pailin, Kamrieng, Samlout, and Vattanasangkom.

Until 2001, Pailin was part of Battambang Province, then elevated to city/municipal status, and then again to provincial status, and thus became an autonomous zone of its own.

The current governor of Pailin province is Ban Sreymom, appointed by royal decree on 18 December 2020. Sreymom is a member of the ruling Cambodian People's Party and previously represented Pailin constituency in the National Assembly. She is the second woman in Cambodian history to serve as a provincial governor.

When the Khmer Rouge forces surrendered in the late 1990s, the Cambodian government, headed by Hun Sen, allowed former members to manage modern-day Pailin as a special administrative area to facilitate and maintain peace.

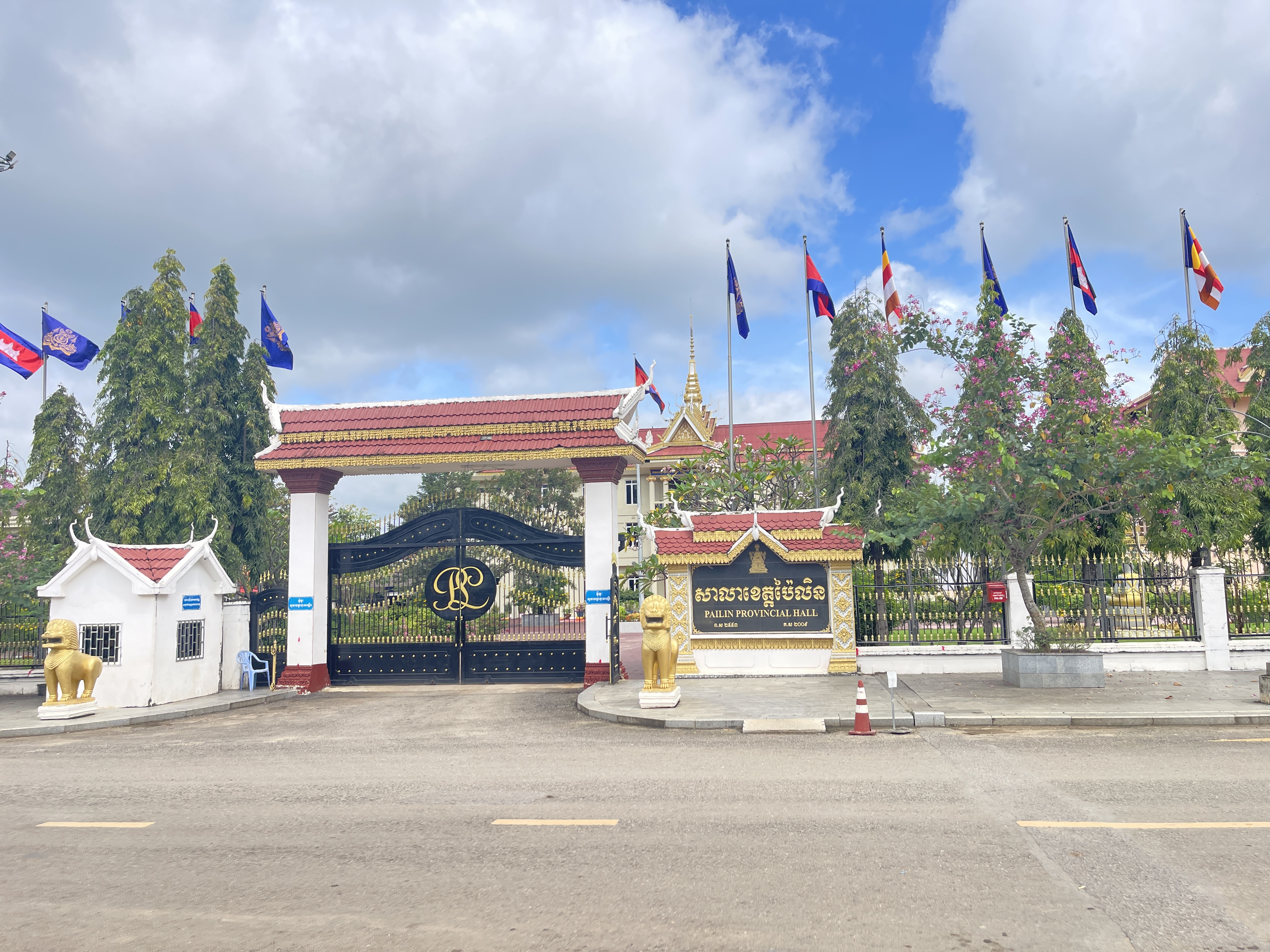
Pailin Provincial Hall in Pailin City next to Independence Monument

=== Administrative divisions ===
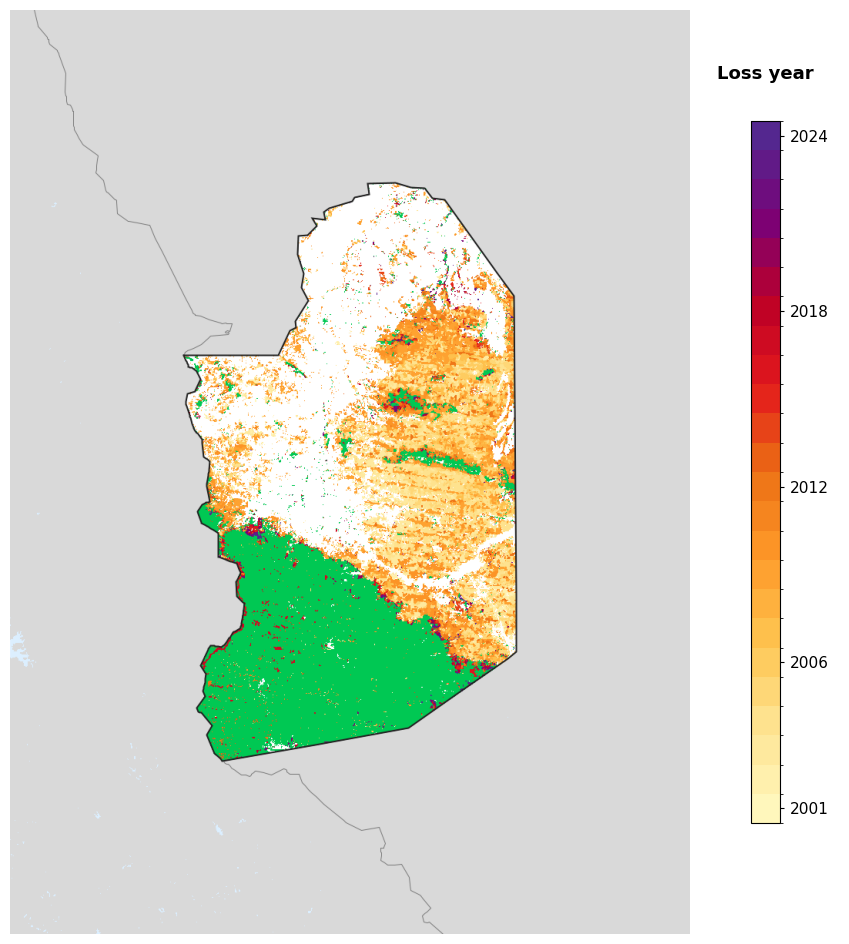
Tree-cover loss year in Pailin, 2001-2024, from the Global Forest Change dataset.

The province is divided into 1 municipality and 1 district, further divided into 8 communes.

Map	#	ISO code	Name	Khmer	Population	Subdivisions
Map	— Divisions —					
		24-02	Sala Krau	សាលាក្រៅ	7,106	4 sangkat
		24-01	Pailin	ប៉ែលិន	37,393	4 sangkat

== Demographics ==
According to the National Institute of Statistics of the Ministry of Planning, the total population of the province in 2013 was 65,792, which grew to 67,166 in 2014. In the latest census conducted in 2019, the province's population was 71,600. Between 1998 and 2008, Pailin had the largest annual growth rate of any province in Cambodia at 11.2%. It then became one of the smallest, with an annual growth rate between 2008 and 2019 being at 0.1%.

== Economy ==
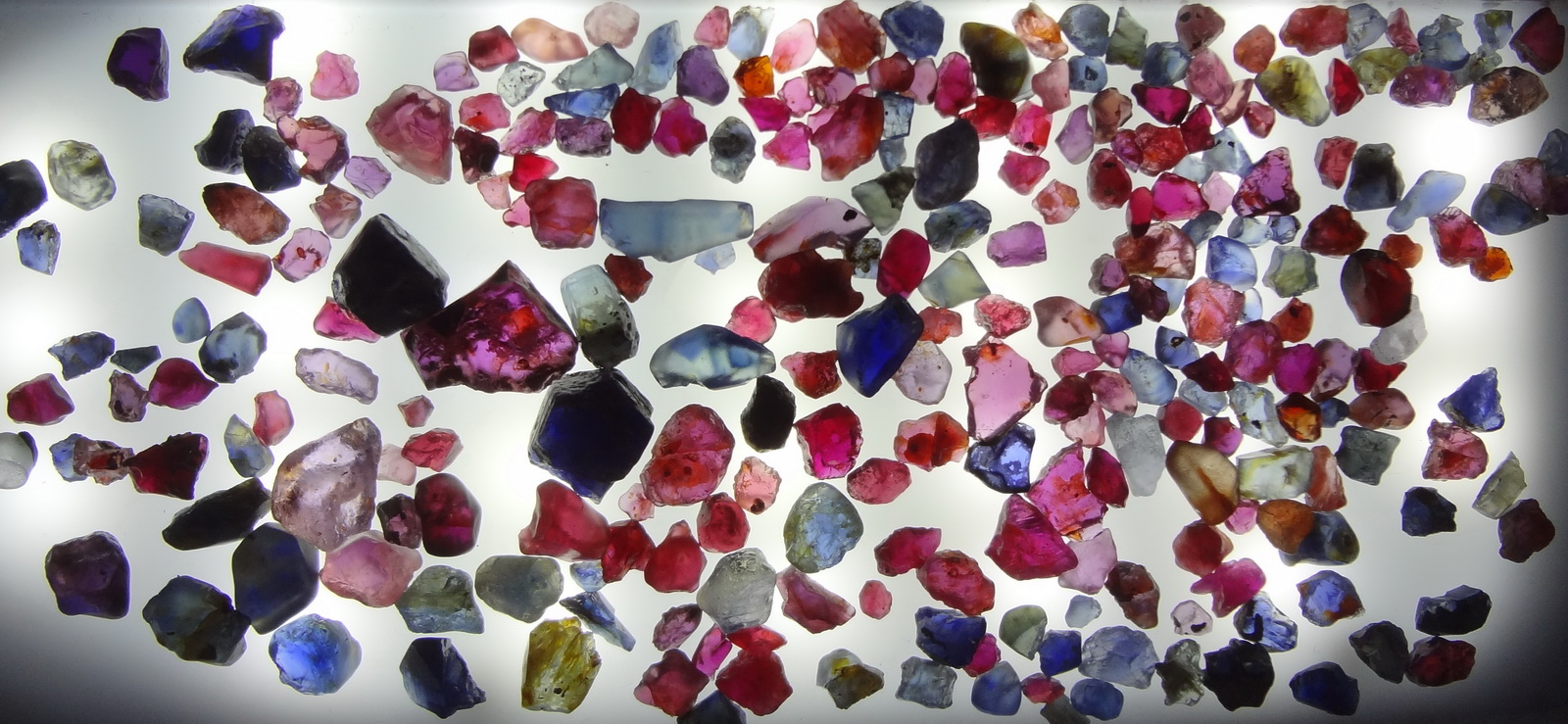
Rubies and sapphires from Pailin

Prior to the Khmer Rouge, Pailin's economy was relatively wealthy and business oriented, dominated by gem mining and tourism. However, the region was almost mined clean during the Cambodian Genocide. The Khmer Rouge logged the area extensively creating great environmental damage.

Merchants in Pailin will accept Cambodian riels, US dollars, and Thai baht; US dollars are preferred.

=== Agriculture ===
Unlike in most of Cambodia, Pailin is composed primarily of uplands where little rice is grown. This makes it very difficult for farmers to rely on subsistence agriculture. Crop failures trigger foraging which has caused land mine accidents. Many farmers produce non-traditional crops for the markets, including sesame, mung, and soya. In 2003-04, it produced 17,204 tons of maize, the second-highest yield produced in the country.

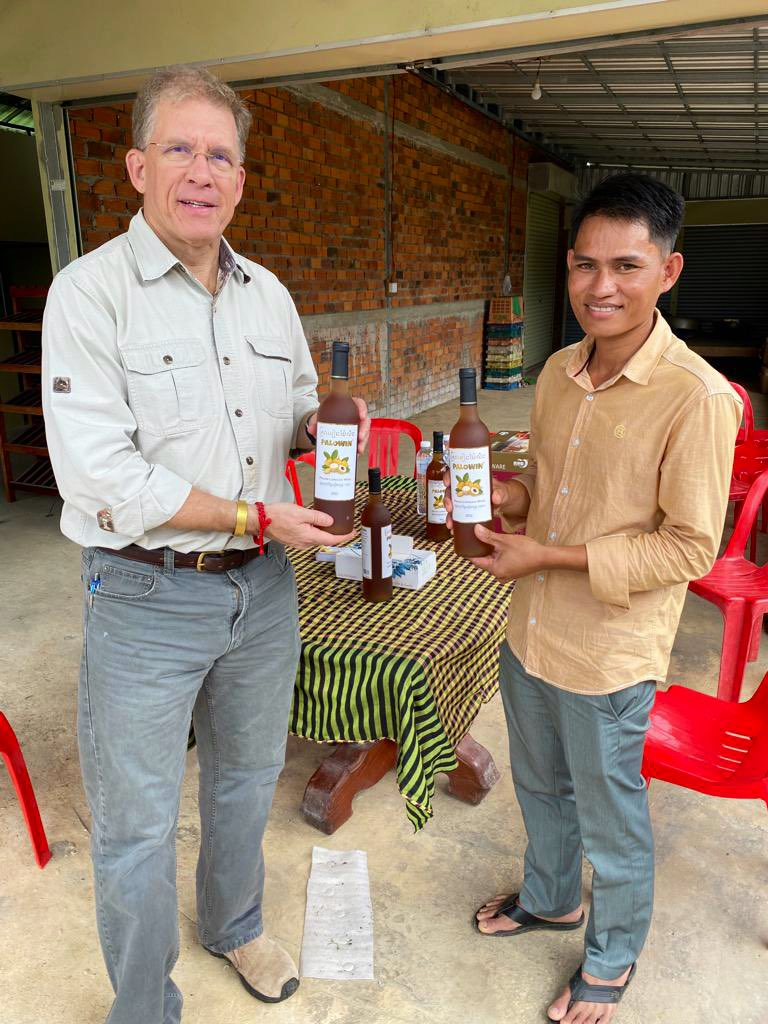
Patrick Murphey and Vouch Thuch holding Vouch's longan wine, 2022

==== Longan farming ====
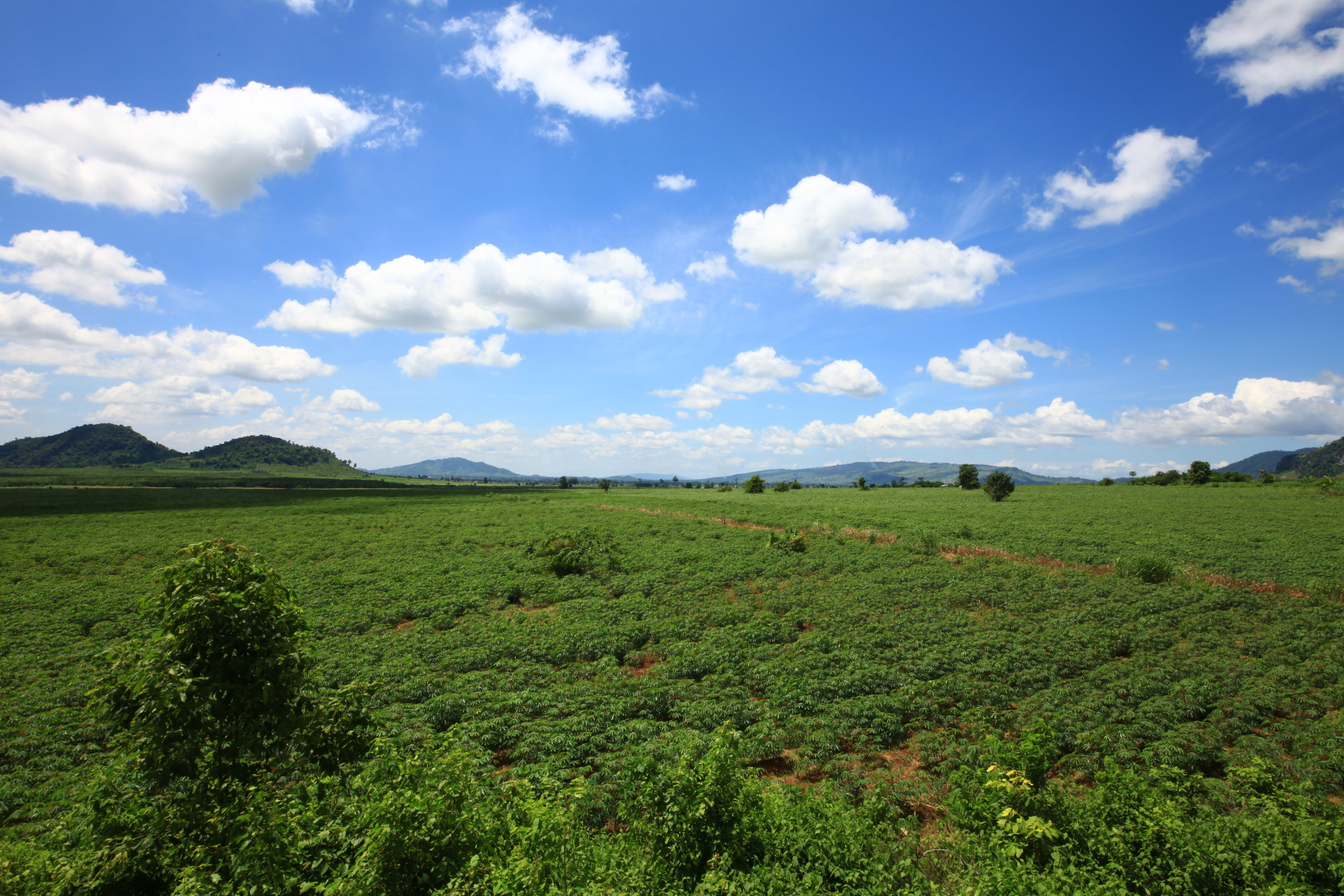
Cassava plantation with the Cardamom Mountains in the background

According to the Mekong Institute in 2013, longans were the third most important crop in Pailin province, behind cassava and maize. In Pailin, they are usually harvested between August and December. The most common variety of longans farmed is Pailin longans, which are farmed primarily in Battambang, Banteay Meanchey, and Pailin provinces. In 2012, longan planting areas in the province occupied 425 hectares (1,050 acres) and produced 1,000 tons, increasing to almost 4,000 hectares (9,900 acres) in 2024. Around 60% of Pailin longans produced in 2012 were supplied to the domestic market, while 40% were sold to Thai buyers. From January to November 2022, farmers harvested 6,900 tonnes of longan, with 500 tonnes being exported to China. Longans have only been approved for export directly to China since 27 October 2022. Chinese demand for Pailin longans then rose, with China becoming the largest export market in the first half of 2023.

Vouch Thuch (born 1983) is believed to be the first longan wine maker in Cambodia and operates the local Pailin Longan Wine Handicraft in the province. Arriving in Pailin in 2000, he saw that longan lacked the market and started the longan wine business in 2008, trademarked as 'Palowin'. He replicated this with mangoes and mango wine. In July 2022, his winery was visited by U.S Ambassador to Cambodia W. Patrick Murphy.

== Tourist attractions ==
Wat Phnom Yat

The main complex was built by Shan migrants from Myanmar in 1922. It is considered the heart of Pailin and is the most popular holy site in the province.

Wat Rattanak Sophoan

At the foot of Phnom Yat is another temple named Wat Rattanak Sophoan. It is believed to have been first constructed during the 15th century and has a syncretism of Burmese and Khmer ornamental design. The temple is known for its gate with three Angkorean-styled spires. On the walls of the temple enclosure surrounding the pagoda is a bas-relief depicting the Hindu saga of the churning of the Ocean of Milk.

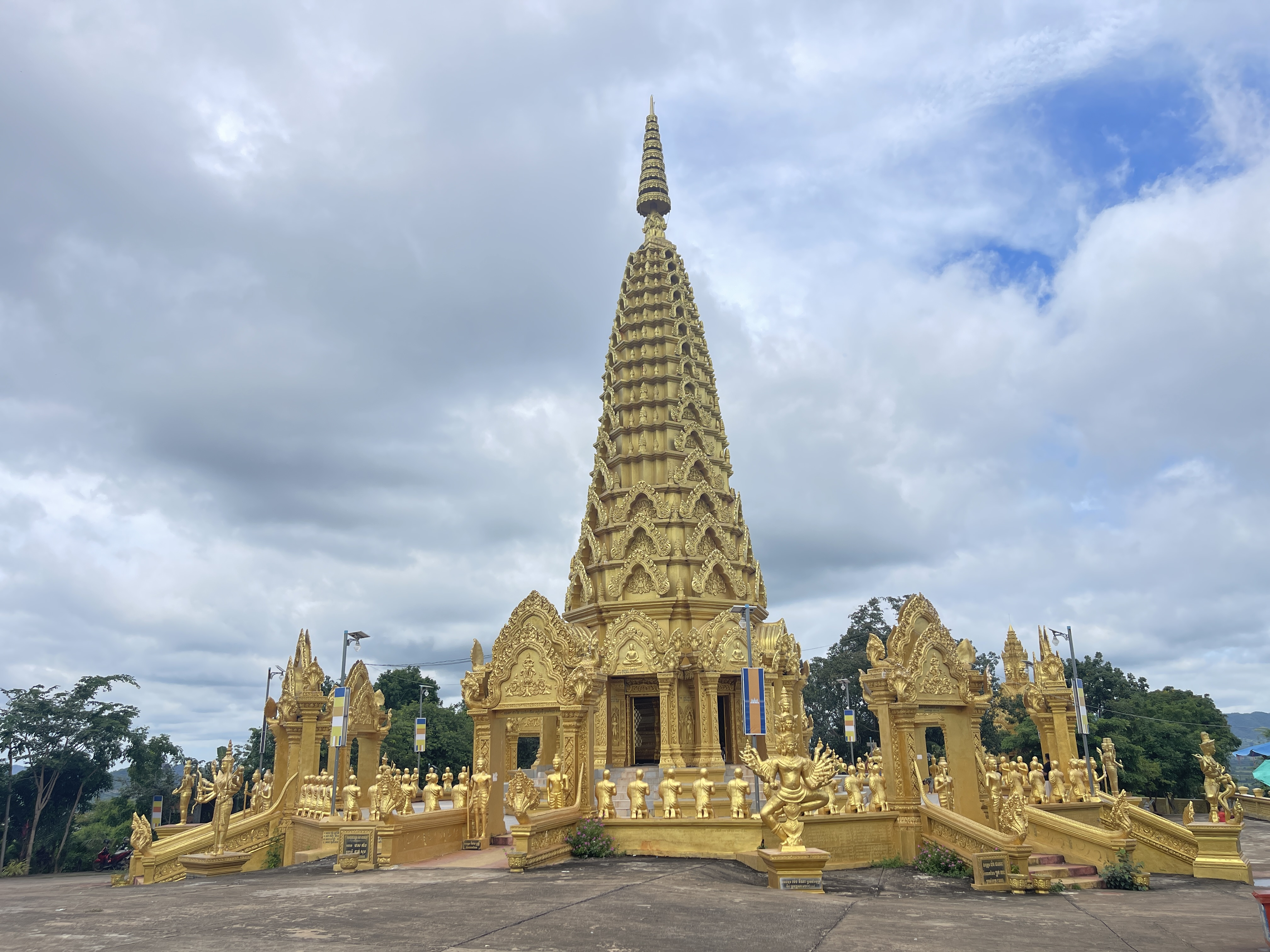
The Eight Doors Pagoda (Phnom Yat)

== Culture ==
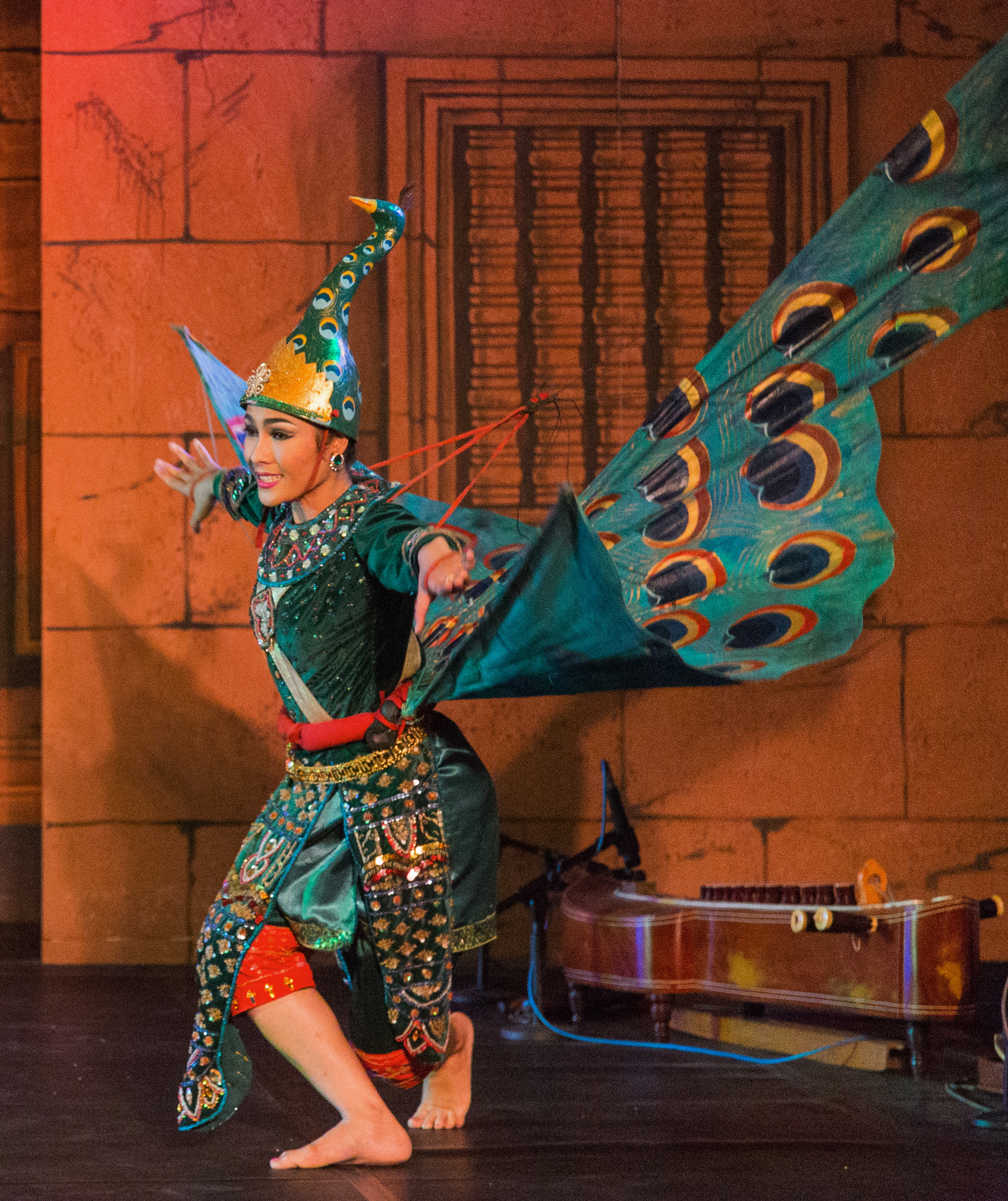
Pailin peacock dance performed in Phnom Penh, 2016

Pailin's culture is distinct from Khmer culture. Before the Khmer Rouge period, Pailin's culture was predominantly Shan Burmese and had much in common with that Thailand and Myanmar. This affinity is shown in the region's cuisine, dress, temple architecture, festivals, and arts. The Shan (one of the many ethnic minorities of Burma), arrived to Pailin from Burma in the 1920s and are considered a part of the Kula people.

There are several dialects spoken locally, including Khmer, Shan, and Kula. The local Khmer dialect shows influence in tone and pronunciation from the Burmese language as well as the Kham Muang and Mon languages.

=== Cuisine ===
In Pailin, there are a few different kinds of foods. Some Kula foods are distinct from Burmese cuisine. The most popular dish from Pailin is known as, Kula noodles (មីកុឡា, mee kola). It is a vegetarian noodle dish made from thin rice stick noodles, steamed and cooked with soy sauce and garlic chive, sometimes mixed with some meats and small lobster. Other dishes include Tom yum from Thailand and Mon banana pudding from Burma. These have all spread to other parts of Thailand and Cambodia, but normally in versions that are flavored more sweetly than the Pailin version, especially in Phnom Penh.

=== Clothing ===
The Traditional clothes of Pailin are Longyi, also known as Sarong. The cloth is often sewn into a cylindrical shape. It is worn around the waist, running to the feet. It is held in place by folding fabric over, without a knot. It is also sometimes folded up to the knee for comfort. These traditional "longyi" have about 2 meters in length of a swan. The cloth is made of cotton and sometimes of silk. Kula men wear ankle-length patterns of checks, plaids, or stripes, "Longyi" in any kind of color. The Men always wear their white eingyi shirt, which has a mandarin collar, and sometimes also wear a traditional jacket called taik-pon over their eingy. It has white, grey, black, or terracotta colors. They put the gaung baung turban on their head and wear simple rubber or velvet slippers on their feet.

For Kula women, calf-length longyi are available in solid colors, flower prints, and many kinds of designs. They often have a red-based color, with partial stripes or very small checks similar to what Mon wear. They also often have horizontal or vertical stripes in the middle part. Royalty traditionally wore a long dress called "thin-dai" decorated with many threads. It was always worn by a lord's daughter and the king of the province's lady. The Women wear a blouse and shirt, which is known as an eingyi. The shirt is decorated with several colors and many pieces of silver. The shirt also has horizontal or vertical stripes in the middle part in a beautiful color. Kula women tie a traditional shawl on their eingyi and lay it on their shoulders. Women tie a band on their head and wear flowers in their hair in a ponytail. They sometimes carry a traditional umbrella made from bamboo. The footwear worn are simple slippers of leather or velvet called Hnyat-phanat.

All of these costumes are usually shiny with bright colors and resembles the attire worn by the Shan in Burma.

Houses in Pailin are commonly built from wood, about 8 centimeters to 1 meter thick, with a wide entrance door. Usually in the middle of these houses is a small prayer area. Spirit houses are commonly placed outside believed to ward off evil spirits. The Kula often plant roses in front of their homes.

== Land mines ==
Pailin and Cambodia, in general, was extensively mined during the three decades of war and remain home to numerous land mines and unexploded ordnance. People are cautioned to stay on marked roads. De-mining remains ongoing with UN help.

== Health ==
Malaria epidemics were common in Pailin due to resistance to anti-malaria drugs. Resistance first appeared around the Cambodian-Thai border in the late 1950s, including Pailin, and then spread to Africa by the early 1980s. Multiple waves of resistance have occurred following the first wave. Although the cause is unknown, many believe that the local strain of malaria parasites or the ecology of the region may have special features that have caused the high resistance rate.
