= Madhupur pineapple =

Geographical Indications in Bangladesh

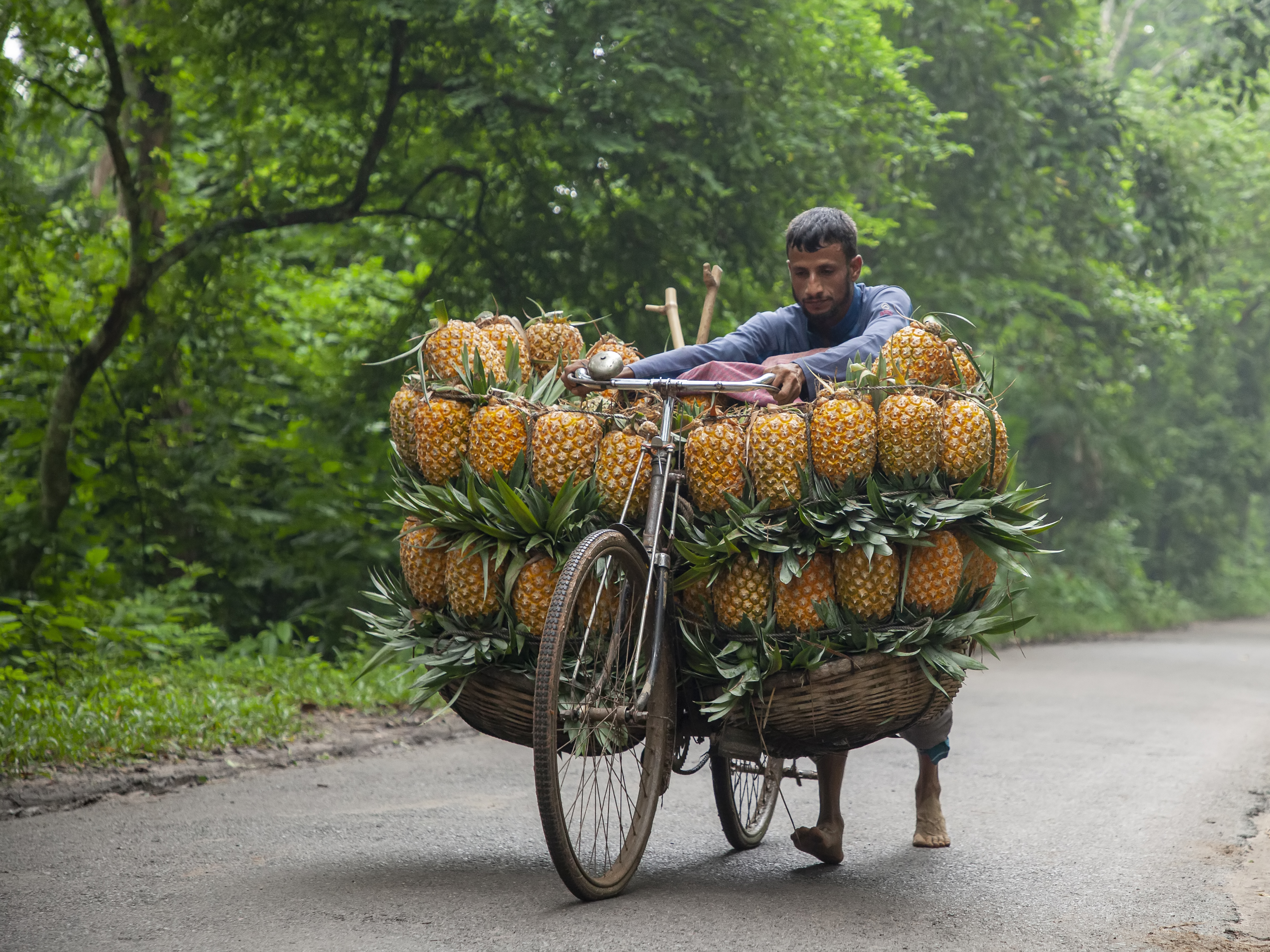
Madhupur pineapple

Madhupur pineapple (Bengali: মধুপুরের আনারস) is an agricultural product cultivated in the Madhupur region of Tangail district, Bangladesh. Madhupur pineapple received Geographical Indication (GI) tag on 24 September 2024.

== History ==
The cultivation of pineapples in Bangladesh was initiated in 1942 by Mizi Dayamai Sangma, a member of the small indigenous Garo community in Idilpur village of Madhupur Upazila. He visited his relatives in Meghalaya, India, and brought back 750 pineapple saplings to start a pineapple plantation at his own home.

== Cultivation ==
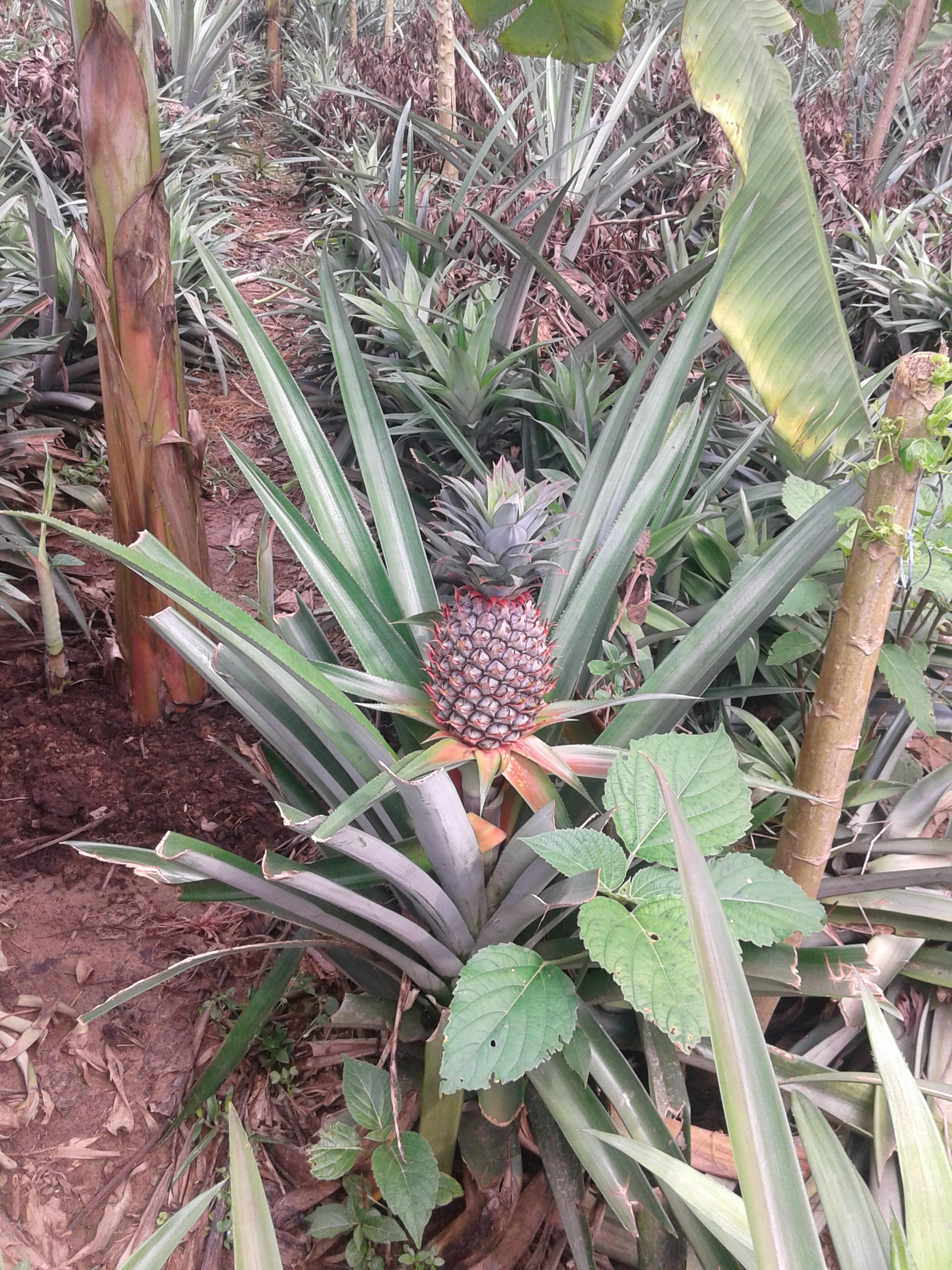
Pineapple cultivation in the green gardens of Madhupur

Although pineapple is cultivated in almost all unions of Madhupur, the highest cultivation is in Arankhola, Sholakuri, and Aushnara unions. The high, red soil in this region is quite suitable for pineapple cultivation, and the pineapple cultivation season begins in the rainy season. From preparing the seedbed for pineapple cultivation, it takes about 18 months to produce a single fruit. Pineapple farmers in this region rely more on organic farming methods, where the use of organic fertilizers is common. Farmers limit the use of chemical fertilizers and cultivate pineapples using organic methods, which helps to maintain the taste and nutritional value of the fruit.

== Varieties of pineapples ==
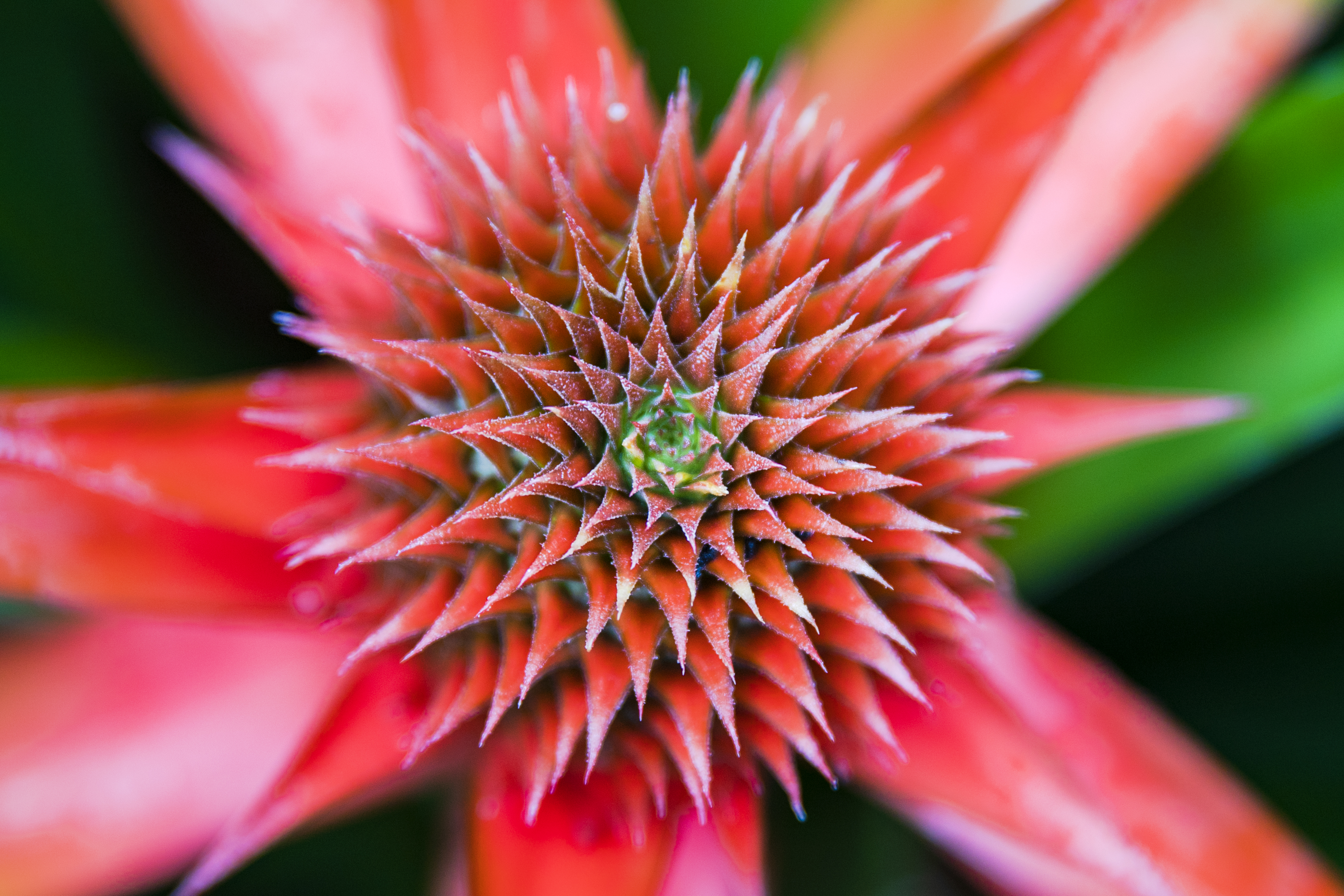
A pineapple inflorescence or flower captured from a pineapple orchard in Madhupur

The special varieties of Madhupur pineapple include:

- Giant Kew (locally known as Calendar)
- Honey Queen (Jaldugi/Jaldungi)
- Ashwina
- MD-2

== See also ==
- Tulshimala rice
- Kataribhog rice
- Khirsapat mango
- List of geographical indications in Bangladesh
