= Kalijira rice =

Geographical Indications in Bangladesh

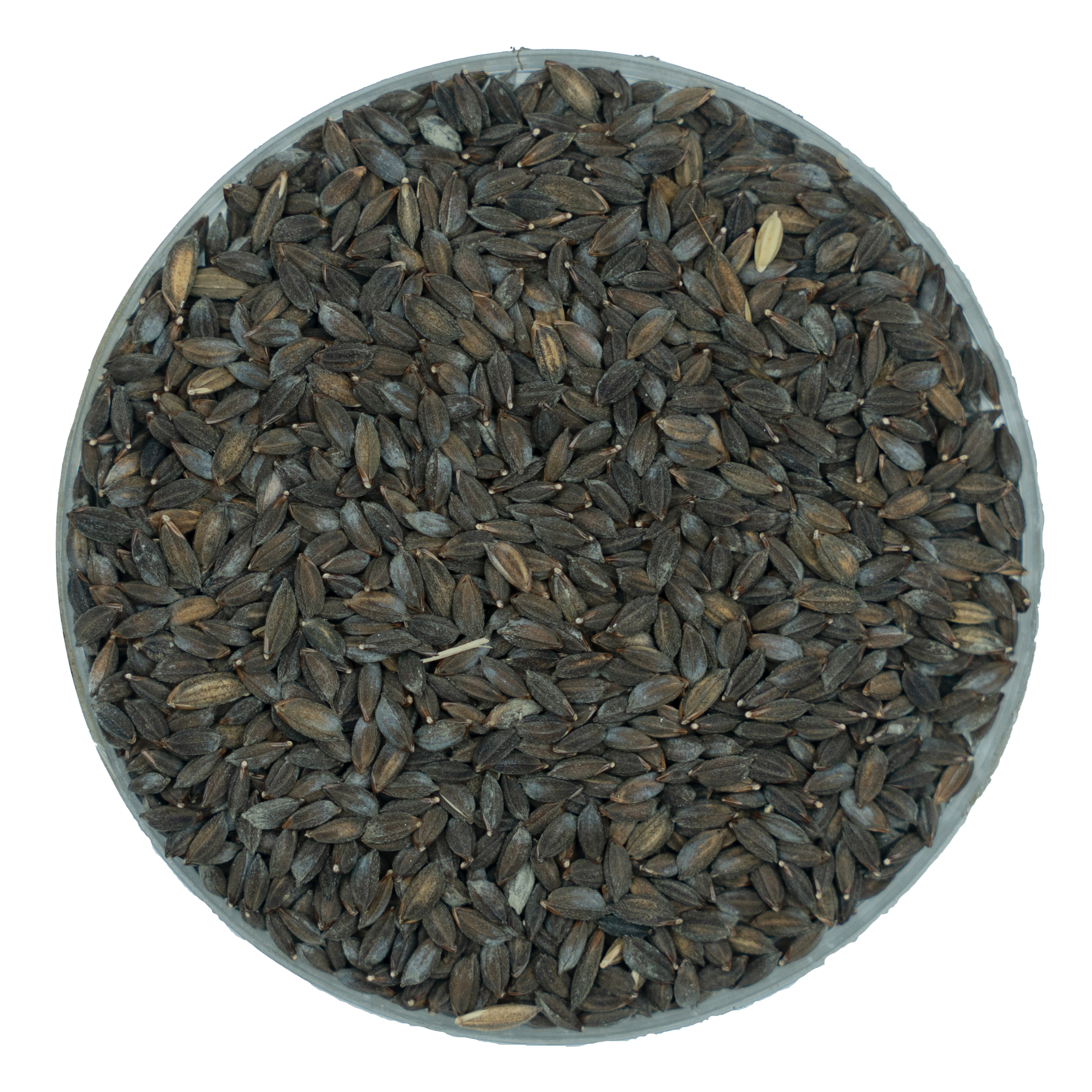
Kalijira rice

Kalijira rice (Bengali: কালিজিরা চাল) is a premium variety of small, slender-grained aromatic rice that is mainly produced in Bangladesh. Its name comes from its resemblance to Kalo jeera or black cumin (Elwendia persica) before milling, due to its black husk. Unlike Basmati rice, Kalijira is slightly sticky when cooked. It is used in several traditional Bengali dishes such as Khichuri, Biryani, Pulao, Jorda, and Kheer. Often referred to as the "Prince of Rice," it is considered one of the finest aromatic rice varieties in Bangladesh and holds a geographical indication (GI) certification.

== Cultivation ==
Kalijira rice is primarily cultivated in the northern regions of Bangladesh, particularly in Dinajpur and Rangpur. Despite its high quality, cultivation has decreased over time due to competition from higher-yielding varieties.

Kalijira rice is one of several fine-grain varieties, including Kasibinni, Begunbichi, Jamai Bhog, and Dadkhani, which are traditionally served to guests in rural Bangladesh.

== Export ==
Kalijira rice is a significant export product for Bangladesh, with high demand in South Asia, the Middle East, and Europe.

== See also ==
- Kataribhog rice
- Tulshimala rice
- List of geographical indications in Bangladesh
