= Geographical indications in Bangladesh =

A geographical indication (GI) is a name or sign used on certain products which corresponds to a specific geographical location or origin (e.g., a town, region, or country). The GI tag ensures that only registered authorized users or residents of the specified geographic region have the right to use the popular product name. Jamdani was the first GI recognized by Government of Bangladesh in 2016.

List of Products Registered as Geographical Indications in Bangladesh:

Serial No.	Geographical Indication	Type	Registration Date	Certificate Issuance Date	District/Region
1	Jamdani	Handicraft	September 1, 2015	November 17, 2016	Dhaka
2	Ilish	Agriculture	November 13, 2016	August 17, 2017	Bangladesh
3	Khirsapat mango	Agriculture	February 2, 2017	January 27, 2019	Chapainawabganj
4	White clay of Bijoypur	Mineral	February 6, 2017	June 17, 2021	Netrokona
5	Kataribhog rice	Agriculture	February 6, 2017	June 17, 2021	Dinajpur
6	Kalijira rice	Agriculture	February 7, 2017	June 17, 2021	Bangladesh
7	Shataranji	Handicraft	July 11, 2019	June 17, 2021	Rangpur
8	Rajshahi silk	Handicraft	September 24, 2017	June 17, 2021	Rajshahi
9	Muslin	Handicraft	January 2, 2018	June 17, 2021	Dhaka
10	Bagda Shrimp	Agriculture	July 4, 2019	April 24, 2022	Khulna
11	Fazli (mango)	Agriculture	March 9, 2017	April 25, 2023	Rajshahi, Chapainawabganj
12	Tulshimala rice	Agriculture	April 11, 2018	June 12, 2023	Sherpur
13	Tiler Khaja	Food stuff			Kushtia
14	Madhupur pineapple	Agriculture		September 24, 2024	Tangail
15	Curd of Bogra	Food stuff		June 26, 2023	Bogra
16	Muktagacha Monda	Food stuff			Mymensingh District
17	Biroi rice	Agricultural			Mymensingh
18	Ras Malai	Food Stuff			Comilla District
19	Nakshi Kantha	Handicraft	July 17, 2019		Jamalpur
20	Jamurki Sandesh	Food Stuff	April 30, 2025	April 30, 2025	Tangail
