= Kalonunia rice =

Type of non-Basmati aromatic rice from West Bengal, India

Kalonunia rice (কলোনুনিয়া চাল)
- Geographical indication
- Description: Kalonunia rice is an aromatic rice cultivated in West Bengal
- Type: Aromatic rice
- Area: Northern parts of West Bengal
- Country: India
- Registered: 02 January 2024
- Official website: ipindiaservices.gov.in

Kalonunia rice is a variety of non-Basmati, aromatic, black textured small rice mainly grown in the Indian state of West Bengal. It is a common and widely cultivated crop in districts of Cooch Behar, Jalpaiguri and Alipurduar along with some parts of Darjeeling & Kalimpong districts of West Bengal.

Under its Geographical Indication tag, it is referred to as "Kalonunia Rice".

== Name ==
The word "Kalonunia" is derived from "Kalo", meaning black in the state language of Bengali, representing the black-husked grain, and "Nunia", indicating a local rice group of West Bengal. Kalonunia is also reported as Kala nenia, Kala nina, or Kala nooniah.

=== Local name ===
It is known as Kalonunia chaal (কলোনুনিয়া চাল) or simply as Kalonunia. "Chaal" means rice in the local state language of Bengali.

== Description ==
Some of the uses and characteristics of Kalonunia rice:

=== Characteristics ===
- It is noted for its vibrant black husk appearance and non-sticky texture. This blast resistant rice variety has a wide genetic base providing protection against pests, diseases, pathogens, and climate fluctuations. It also requires less fertilizer compared to other varieties.

=== Uses ===
- This rice is used as an everyday plain rice, as an alternative to Basmati. It is also used to prepare traditional sweet dishes, grain dust for local sweet dishes like Pithe and Patisapta, and Payesh during rituals and special functions. Additionally, it is used to make puffed rice, known locally as Muri, Bhat, and in the preparation of Bhat (boiled rice), Polao, or Bhog (Khichdi).

== Geographical indication ==
It was awarded the Geographical Indication (GI) status tag from the Geographical Indications Registry under the Union Government of India on 2 January 2024 (valid until 11 March 2034).

State Agricultural Management & Extension Training Institute (SAMETI) from Narendrapur, proposed the GI registration of Kalonunia rice. After filing the application in March 2021, the rice was granted the GI tag in 2024 by the Geographical Indication Registry in Chennai, making the name "Kalonunia rice" exclusive to the rice grown in the region. It thus became the third rice variety from West Bengal after Tulaipanji rice and the 26th type of goods from West Bengal to earn the GI tag.

The GI tag protects the rice from illegal selling and marketing, and gives it legal protection and a unique identity.
