= Khirsapat mango =

Edible mango cultivar

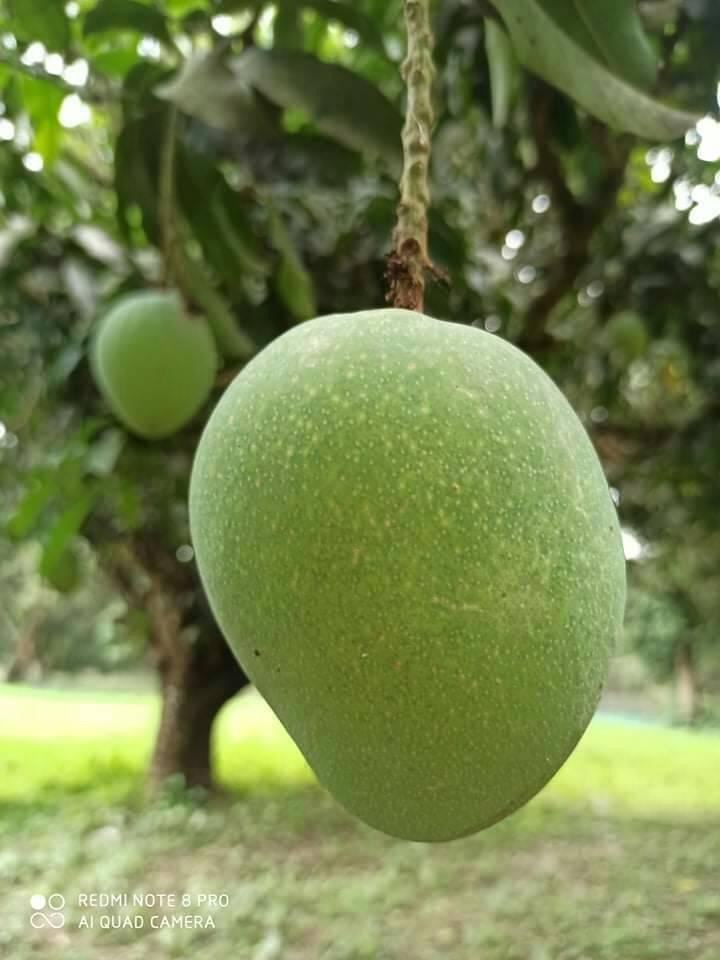
Khirsapat mango of Chapainawabganj

Khirsapat mango (Bengali: খিরসাপাত আম) is a variety of mango. It starts ripening from the beginning of summer. The fruits are drupes, and are medium-sized and round in shape. They are approximately 8 cm long, 7 cm wide, and weigh about 264 grams. The stalk of the Khirsapat mango is quite thick and firm. The skin is smooth, and when ripe, the upper part turns yellow. The middle to lower part of the mango remains light green. The edible portion is 67.2%. The flesh is fiberless and yellowish. The fruit is aromatic, juicy, and sweet.

== Geographical indication products ==
Chapai Nawabganj District's "Khirsapat" mango is the third geographical indication (GI) product of Bangladesh. With the GI tag, this mango has been recognized as a unique product of Bangladesh. The history of Khirsapat mango cultivation dates back nearly 200 years. Maharaja Sutasansu Kumar Acharya Bahadur of Mymensingh established an orchard in Kansat, Chapainawabganj, where Khirsapat mangoes were cultivated along with other varieties. Currently, this variety is commercially cultivated in five upazilas of Chapainawabganj district. Presently, Khirsapat mangoes account for 30% of mango production in Bangladesh.

== Khirsapat and Himsagar ==
Although Khirsapat and Himsagar mangoes are often considered to be the same, but they are actually two different varieties. Khirsapat mangoes are primarily found in Chapainawabganj, Bangladesh, and Malda district, India. Himsagar is a famous mango from West Bengal, India, and is a geographical indication product. In Bangladesh, Himsagar mangoes are cultivated in Satkhira, Rajshahi, and Naogaon districts. When ripe, the upper part of the Khirsapat mango turns yellow, while the Himsagar mango remains a greenish-yellow color even when ripe. Khirsapat mangoes are slightly larger and wider at the stalk. There is also a smaller variety of Khirsapat called Khudkhirsapat. Khudkhirsapat has a slightly darker green color. Although both varieties have similar prices, Khirsapat mangoes are sweeter. The climate of Chapainawabganj is particularly suitable for growing Khirsapat mangoes. Due to its sweet taste, the demand for Khirsapat mangoes is increasing both domestically and internationally. Khirsapat and Himsagar mangoes look almost identical, which is why many people often mistake one for the other.

== Location and time ==
The peak season for Khirsapat mangoes is from the 7th to the 30th of June. Once harvested, the mangoes can be stored at home for 6 to 8 days. Khirsapat mangoes have a very high yield and are highly commercial due to high demand. Chapainawabganj district, especially Shibganj Upazila, is the largest producer of Khirsapat mangoes. Approximately 35,000 tons of Khirsapat mangoes are produced annually on 3,400 hectares of land in Chapainawabganj district. Apart from Chapainawabganj, Khirsapat mangoes are also cultivated in Rajshahi, Natore, Dinajpur, Bogura, and Naogaon districts. However, after Chapainawabganj, Rajshahi is the leading producer of Khirsapat mangoes.

Chapainawabganj district falls under the high Ganges River flood plain of Agricultural Ecological Zone 11. A soil pH of 6.5-7.5 is required for producing good quality Khirsapat mangoes, which is available in this area. The climate of this region also affects the quality of the mangoes. Generally, the weather is dry and cool during the flowering stage of the mango trees, and dry and hot (28-35 degrees Celsius) during the growth and ripening stage, which results in good yield and quality of the mangoes. If there is rainfall during the flowering stage or after the emergence of flower buds, the mangoes may be attacked by various diseases and pests. Excessive rainfall during the growth and ripening stage can deteriorate the quality of the mangoes. Although mangoes are produced in other districts of the country, the unique soil and climatic conditions of Chapainawabganj enable the production of a higher quantity of Khirsapat mangoes.

=== Cultivation ===
To prepare a plot for a mango orchard, the land should be thoroughly cultivated first. Then, following a design, mango saplings should be planted at specific locations using the popular square method. The beginning of the rainy season, especially the months of Asharh and Srabon, is the ideal time for planting mango trees. It's best to avoid planting saplings during excessive rainfall. After digging the holes, they should be left to dry in the sun for 10-15 days. When filling the holes, mix 10 kg of cow dung manure, 50 grams of TSP, 250 grams of MP, 250 grams of gypsum, and 50 grams of zinc sulfate with the top soil and fill the hole, placing the mixed soil at the bottom and the bottom soil at the top. 10-15 days after filling the hole, plant the sapling straight in the middle of the hole and press the soil around it. After planting, the tree should be watered and tied to a sturdy stake. When the sapling is 2-3 years old and new branches sprout from the base, they should be pruned. Any physical deformities in the tree should be pruned. When the tree is 4-5 years old, it should bear mangoes. In fruiting trees, remove suckers, dry branches, and diseased branches. Fertilize the mango tree twice a year. Apply fertilizer once at the beginning of the rainy season and once after the rainy season, followed by the necessary irrigation. If flower buds appear on the mango tree but do not bloom and the mangoes become like pea seeds, irrigation should be provided in both these conditions. The main pests of the mango tree include the mango fruit borer and the fruit fly. These can be controlled by applying approved insecticides and the bagging method. Among the diseases of mango, anthracnose and fruit rot are the most common. These diseases can be controlled by using approved fungicides and by treating the mangoes in hot water after harvesting.

== See also ==
- List of geographical indications in Bangladesh
- Fazli (mango)
