= Mission Organic Value Chain Development for North Eastern Region =

A scheme of the Indian government

Mission Organic Value Chain Development for North Eastern Region (MOVCD-NER) is a central sector scheme under the Government of India's organic scheme which aims at development of organic value chains in the North East Region of India. The scheme is being implemented in all eight states of the North East India namely Arunachal Pradesh, Assam, Manipur, Meghalaya, Mizoram, Nagaland, Sikkim and Tripura since 2015-16.

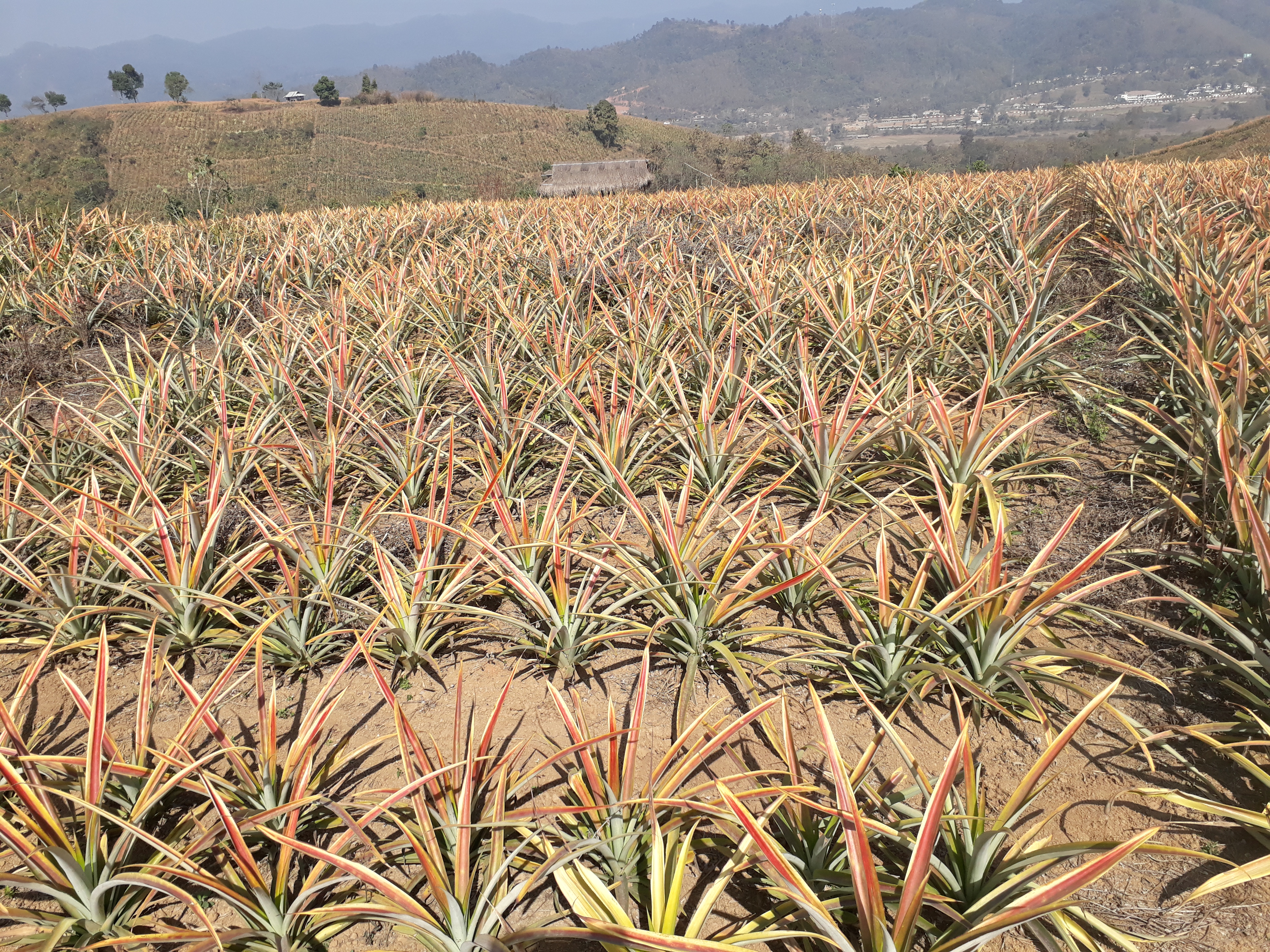
Pineapple FPO in Nagaland

The scheme entails creation of 100 FPO/FPC across the eight states comprising a total area of 50000 hectare. As of 2018, 50,000 farmers have been engaged under the scheme. The scheme provides support to the complete value chain through inputs, seeds, organic certification, creation of facilities for collection, aggregation, processing, marketing and brand building initiative. Organic certification of the land under the FPOs is done by a third-party certification body under the National Programme for Organic Production (NPOP), which is mandatory for exports.

== Background ==
India’s North-East region has witnessed a very limited use of agro-chemicals with farmers using traditional methods and on-farm inputs for farming. The region is also characterized by a diverse agro-ecological zones, variable terrain and sufficient rainfall to support a wide variety of fruit, grain and spice crops. The organic credentials of the region received a boost in the year 2016 when Sikkim was declared India’s first organic state by Prime Minister Narendra Modi. MOVCD-NER scheme was conceptualized to explore this untapped potential for organic in the region.

== Scheme components ==
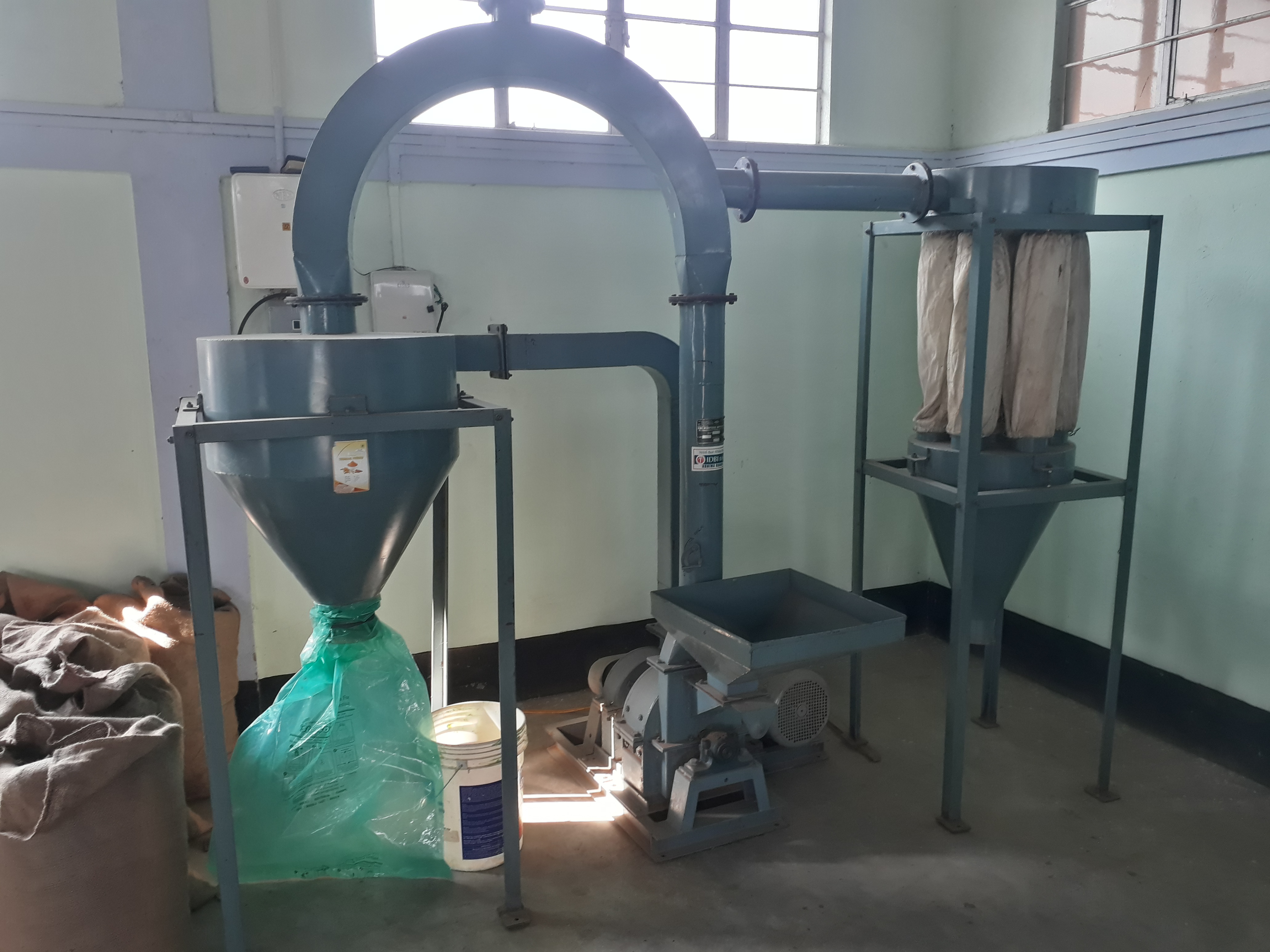
Turmeric Powdering Unit in Dimapur, Nagaland

The scheme has been divided into various value chain components which includes Production, Processing and Marketing for which support is provided to the farmer/FPO in terms of organic inputs, organic certification, processing and storage infrastructure. Under its Value Chain Processing component, the scheme offers subsidies to FPOs and private investors to set up processing and post-harvest infrastructure such as integrated processing units, collection centres, grading and sorting centres, cold storage units, and refrigerated transport. Subsidies of up to 50% can be availed by private companies while the FPOs can avail a 75% subsidy.

== Scheme subsidies ==
The scheme offers financial assistance for setting up the following:

1. Functional infrastructure for collection, aggregation, grading units and North-Eastern (NE) organic bazaar @ Rs. 15 lakh (75% subsidy).
2. Integrated Processing Units with Total Financial Outlay (TFO) of Rs. 600 lakh or more limited to 75% to Farmer Producer Companies (FPCs) and 50% to private entrepreneurs as credit linked back ended subsidy.
3. Integrated pack house with 75% subsidy to FPCs on TFO of 50 lakh or more and 50% to private entrepreneurs or maximum of 37.50 lakh whichever is less as credit linked back ended subsidy.
4. Transportation/ 4-wheeler up to TFO of 12 lakh (50%).
5. Refrigerated transport vehicle/ Pre-cooling/ cold stores/ ripening chambers up to TFO of 25 lakh (75% subsidy to FPC and 50% to private).

== Crops ==
The FPOs of the MOVCD-NER scheme grow a variety of spices, fruits and grain crops like turmeric, Ginger, large cardamom, chilli, pineapple, kiwi, mandarin, red rice, Black Aromatic Rice (Chakhao), Kachai Lemon, glutinous rice, etc.
