= White Clay =

White Clay may refer to:

- White clay, another name for the clay mineral kaolin

== Places ==
United States

- White Clay Hundred, an unincorporated subdivision of New Castle, Delaware
- White Clay Creek, a tributary of the Christina River, in southern Pennsylvania and northern Delaware

Bangladesh

- White clay of Bijoypur, a significant mineral resource located in the Bijoypur area of Durgapur Upazila in the Netrokona district of Bangladesh.

== See also ==
- Whiteclay (disambiguation)
