= White clay of Bijoypur =

Geographical Indications in Bangladesh

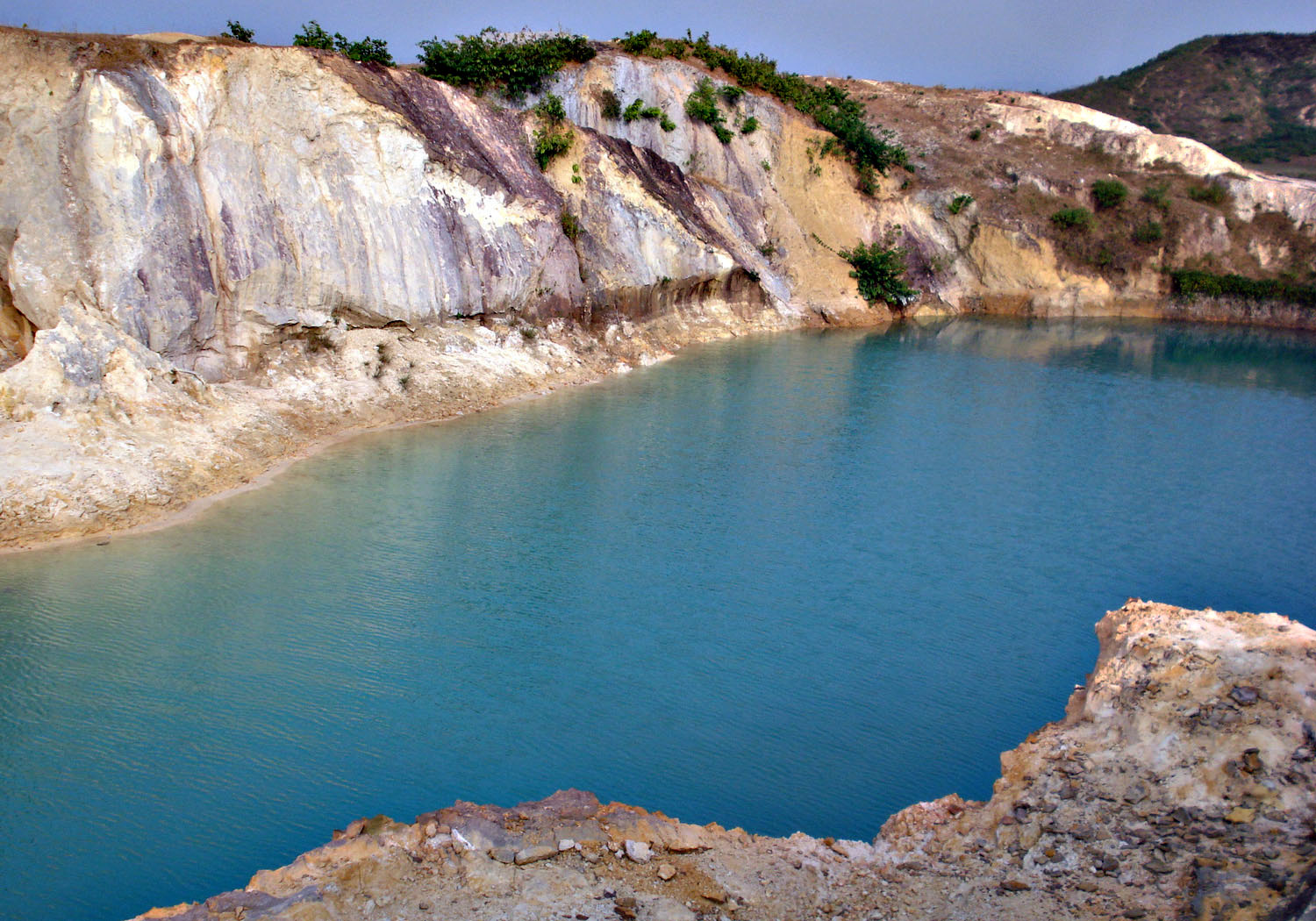
White clay of Bijoypur

The white clay of Bijoypur (Bengali: বিজয়পুরের সাদামাটি), also known as porcelain clay or kaolin, is a significant mineral resource located in the Bijoypur area of Durgapur Upazila in the Netrokona district of Bangladesh. The presence of white clay in this region was identified through a geological survey in 1957. In 2021, the white clay of Bijoypur was recognized as a Geographical Indication (GI) of Bangladesh.

== Geographical location and area ==
The white clay mine of Bijoypur is located approximately 7 kilometers northwest of the Durgapur Upazila Parishad, in the Arapara and Maizpara mouzas of Kullagora Union. This mineral region is approximately 15.5 kilometers long and 600 meters wide, consisting of small and large hills, mountains, and flat land.

== History and discovery ==
The white clay hills of Bijoypur are primarily from the Tertiary period. The presence of this white clay was identified during a geological survey in 1957. Kohinoor Aluminum Works began commercial extraction of white clay in 1960. Subsequently, 13 test wells were drilled in 1964–65, and commercial extraction of the clay began in 1968. According to the preliminary survey, there are approximately 24.7 million metric tons of white clay reserves in this region, which is capable of meeting Bangladesh's demand for 300 years.

== Origin and characteristics ==
White clay is primarily composed of the mineral kaolinite, which is widely used in the ceramic industry. The White clay from Bijoypur is naturally rich in kaolin or aluminum, making it renowned for its high-quality porcelain. This clay is commonly used in the production of ceramic utensils, tiles, sanitary ware, and glass.

== Tourism and biodiversity ==
The White clay mining area of Bijoypur is now a popular tourist destination. In 2016, the extraction of White clay was halted by court order, which is considered an important step for environmental conservation and safeguarding the livelihoods of local people. Although mining activities are currently suspended, the area contains layers of soil in various colors, including black, reddish, brown, purple and blue, alongside the white clay. Additionally, the beauty of small and large hills, mountains, and blue water lakes attracts tourists.

== Images ==
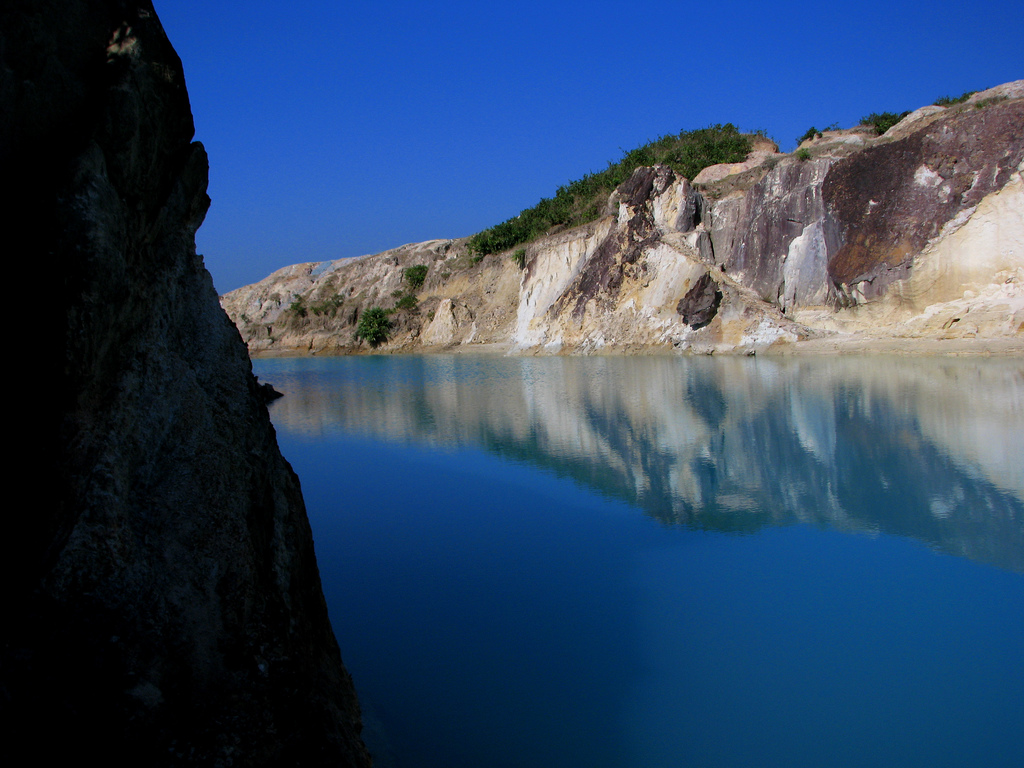
Lake located at the White Clay hills in Bijoypur

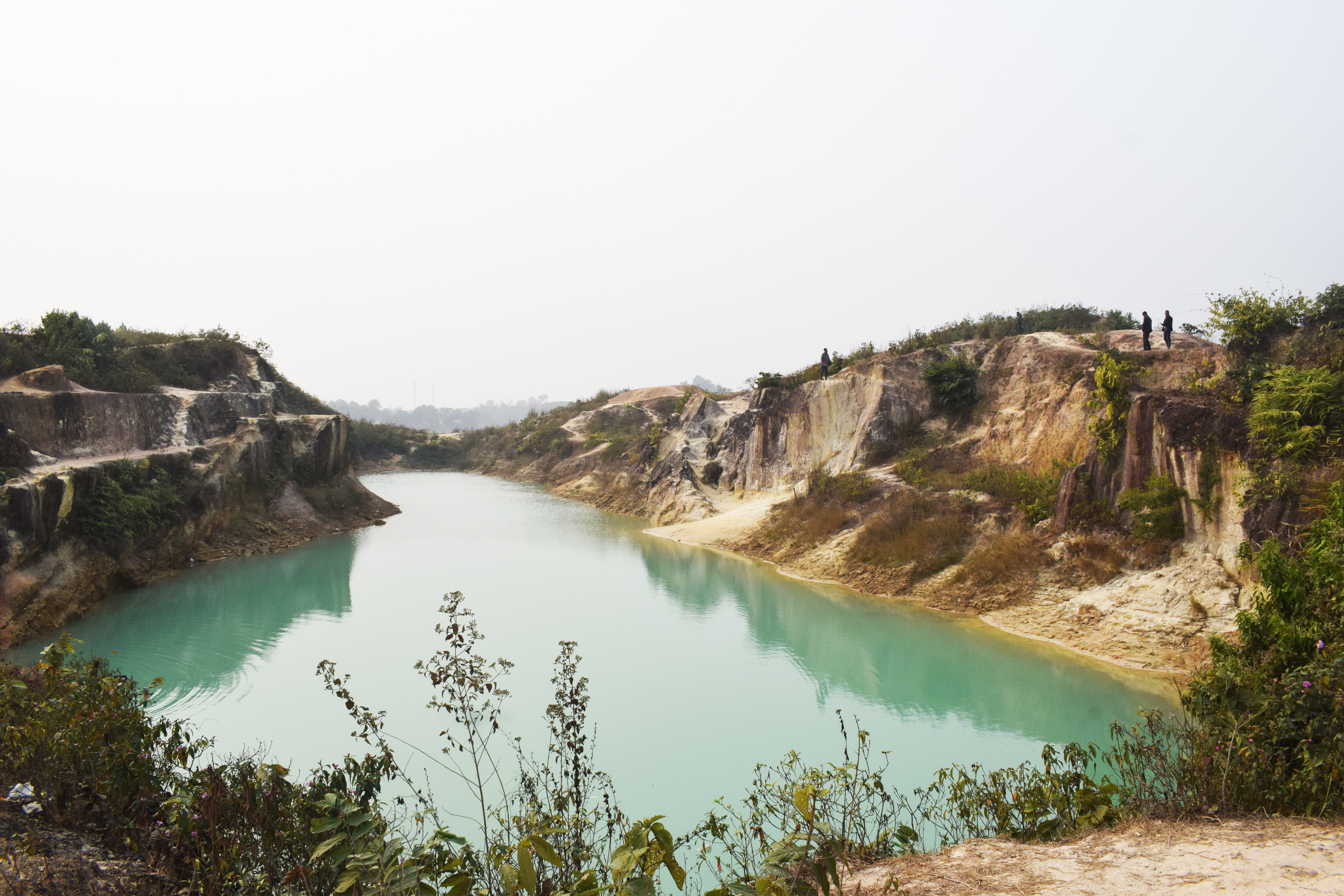
Lake located at the White Clay hills in Bijoypur

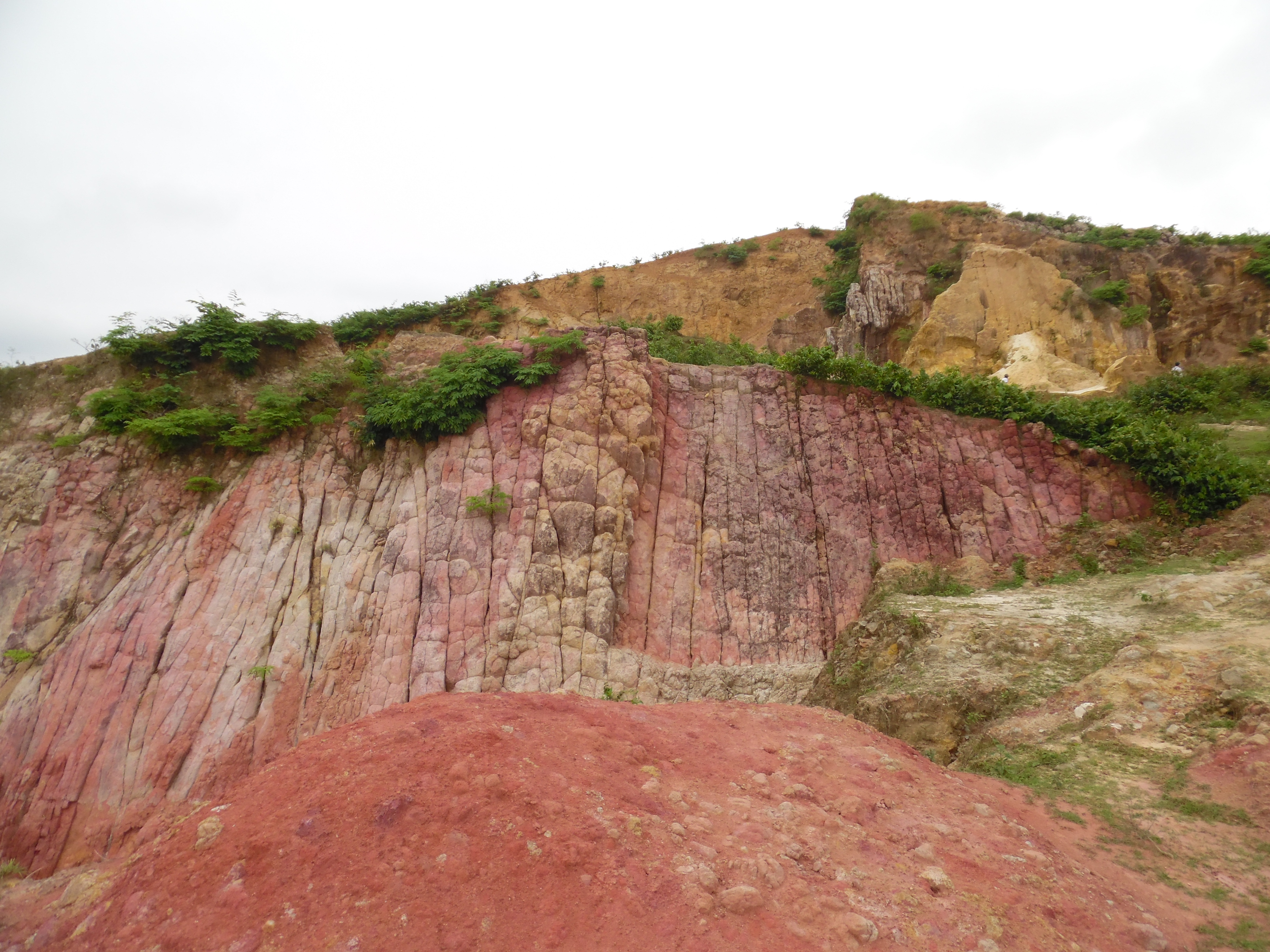
White Clay hills in Bijoypur

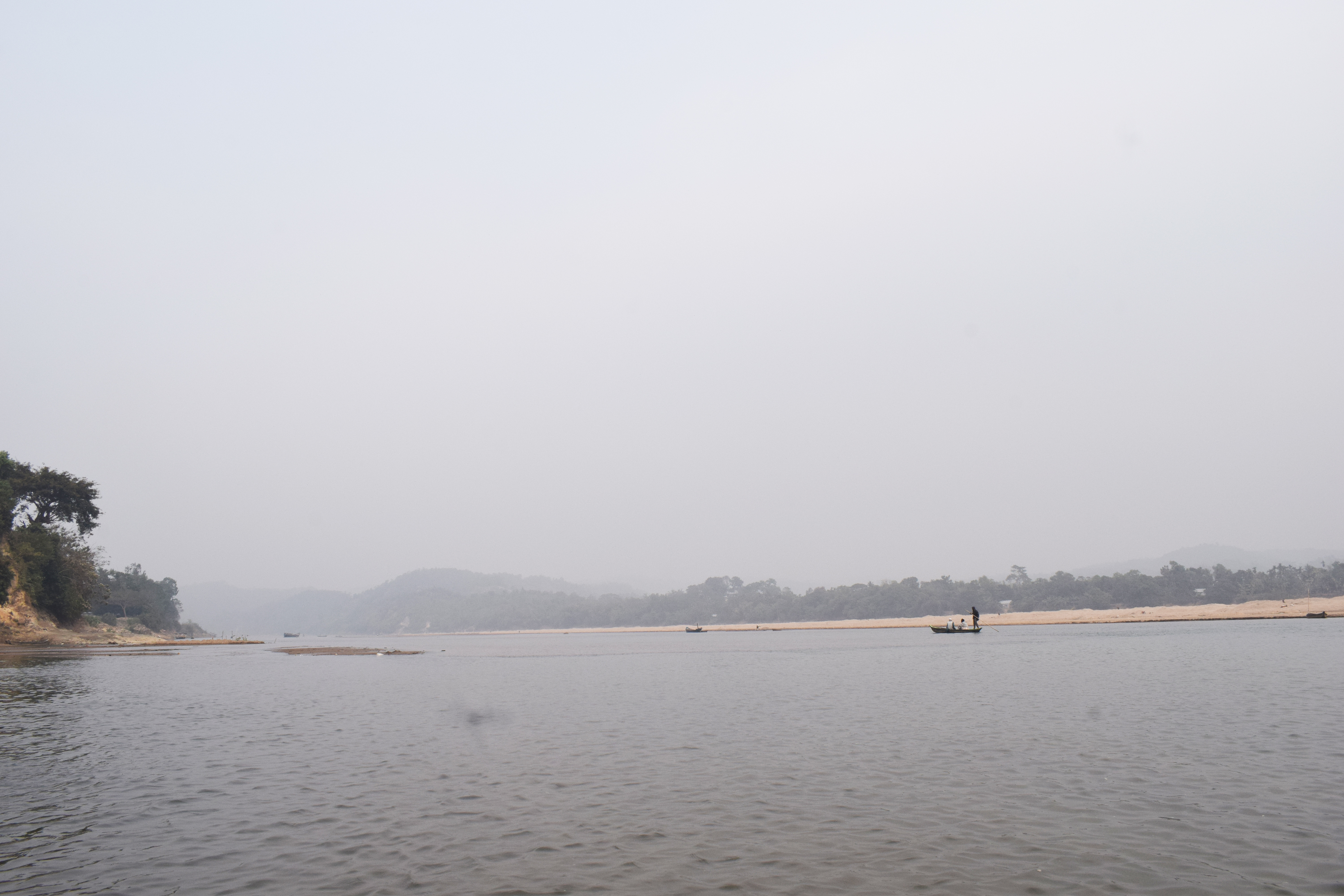
Someshwari River at Bijoypur Boat Ghat

== See more ==
- Shataranji
- Madhupur pineapple
- List of geographical indications in Bangladesh
