= Wehani rice =

Variety of aromatic brown rice

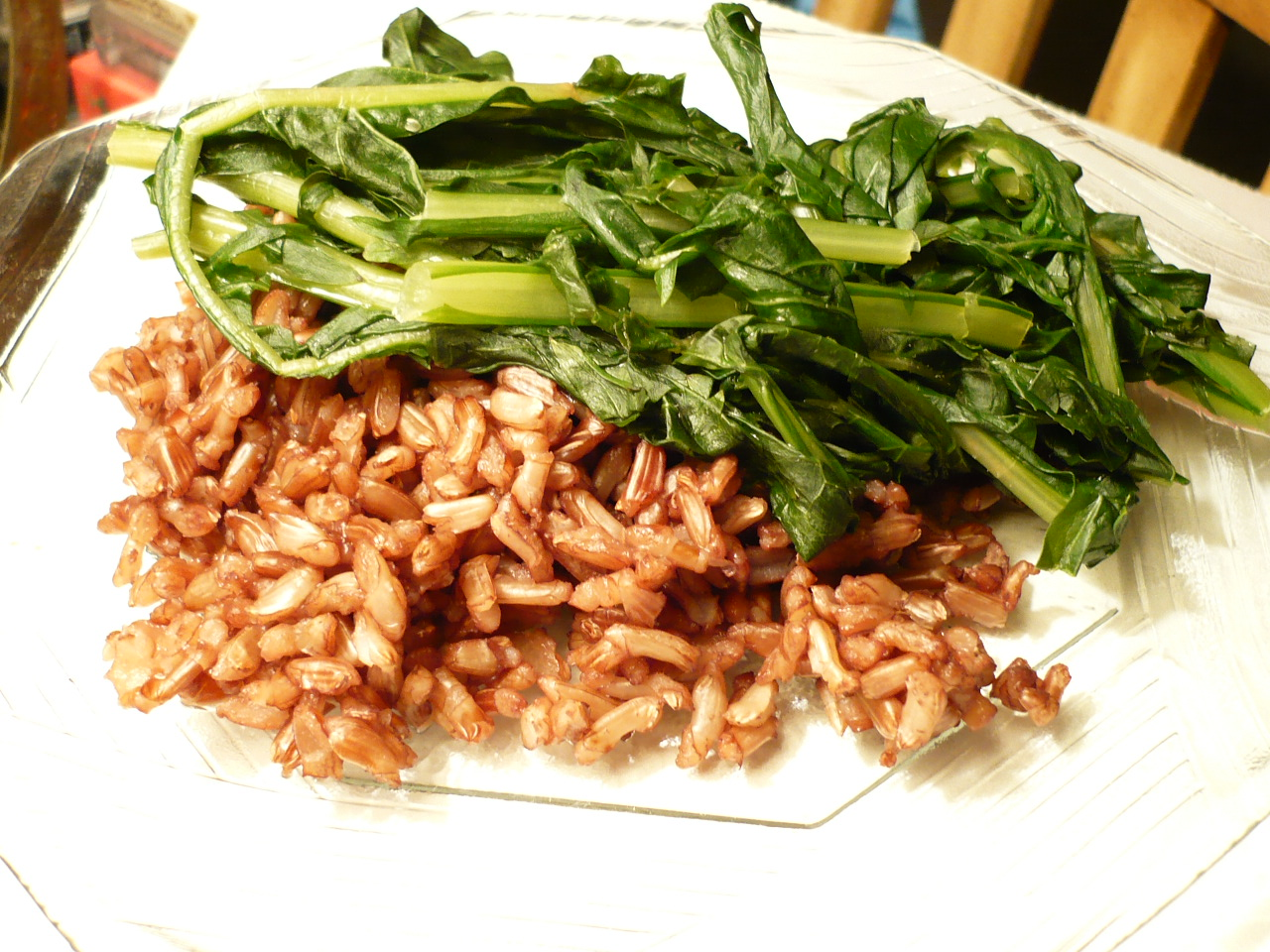
- A plate of Wehani rice, with sautéed dandelion greens
- Alternative names: California Red Jasmine Rice
- Type: Brown rice
- Place of origin: Richvale, California
- Created by: Lundberg Family Farms
- Invented: c. Late 20th Century

Wehani rice, also known as California Red Jasmine Rice, is a variety of aromatic brown rice developed in the late 20th century by Lundberg Family Farms of Richvale, California. The name of the rice originates from the brothers of the family, Wendell, Eldon, Homer, Albert, and Harlan Lundberg.

Wehani rice was developed from basmati rice seeds, which originate from India. The grains of Wehani rice are reddish-brown in color and resemble wild rice. When cooked, the rice produces an aroma similar to that of hot buttered popcorn or peanuts and is slightly chewy in texture.

Being developed from basmati rice, this variety of rice can be classified as Oryza sativa, or Asian rice. It can be placed more specifically in the indica subspecies.

== See also ==
- List of rice varieties
- Ambemohar
- Basmati rice
- Jasmine rice
- Oryza sativa
