= Aromatic rice =

Type of rice

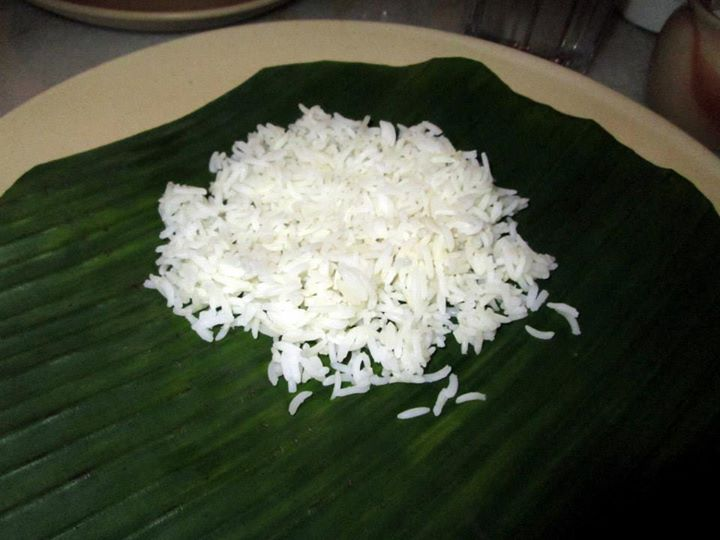
Aromatic Gobindobhog rice

Aromatic rice is one of the major types of rice. It is a medium- to long-grained rice. It is known for its nutty aroma and taste, which is caused by the chemical compound 2-acetyl-1-pyrroline. Varieties of aromatic rice include Ambemohar, Basmati, Jasmine, Radhunipagal, Sona Masuri, Tulaipanji, Tulshimala, Wehani, Kalijira, Kala Namak Kalanamak rice, Chinigura, Gobindobhog, Kali Mooch and wild Pecan rice. When cooked, the grains have a light and fluffy texture except for Gobindobhog rice which is sticky in texture.

Aromatic rice produces more 2-acetyl-1-pyrroline than usual due to a loss-of-function mutation in the BADH2 gene. The BADH2 mutation can be transferred by conventional breeding; it is a recessive trait. Gene editing can be used to induce a similar mutation in ordinary rice, turning them aromatic without affecting other traits.

The aromatic cultivar group originated in the Indian subcontinent about 2400–4000 years ago, from an admixture of the newly-introduced japonica rice (carrying the BADH2 mutation) and the local aus rice. Not all members of the cultivar group are fragrant. The aromatic group is considered part of the japonica subspecies.
