= Whiteclay =

Whiteclay may refer to the following places:

- Whiteclay, Nebraska, an unincorporated community in the United States
- Whiteclay Lake, a lake in Ontario, Canada

== See also ==
- White Clay (disambiguation)
