= Radhunipagal rice =

Variety of rice cultivated in India

Radhunipagal Rice
- Geographical indication
- Alternative names: রাঁধুনিপাগোল চাল
- Description: An aromatic rice cultivated in West Bengal
- Type: Aromatic rice
- Area: Southern region of West Bengal
- Country: India
- Registered: 31 March 2025
- Official website: ipindiaservices.gov.in

Radhunipagal is a rice cultivated in West Bengal, India. It is a brownish white colored small grain aromatic rice with a sweetish taste. It has some medicinal properties also as it is an iron (Fe) and zinc (Zn) rich rice variety.

Radhunipagal has been traditionally cultivated in the southern region of West Bengal for centuries. With the introduction of high-yielding varieties over the past 50 years, its cultivation has moved to marginal status in various blocks of this region. Around 10,000–12,000 farmers in West Bengal traditionally cultivate Radhunipagal rice.

Radhunipagal is used to prepare Payesh and Pitha. Bhog or Khichuri is made from its atap chal (soft-textured raw rice), which is used during puja or religious festivals.

== Geographical area of cultivation ==
Radhunipagal rice is traditionally cultivated in the lower gangetic plains and Rarh regions of West Bengal. With the introduction of high-yielding varieties over the last 50 years, its cultivation has moved to marginal areas in different blocks of the districts in the region. Radhunipagal rice is cultivated in about 1,500–2,000 hectares of land in West Bengal every year during the Kharif season.

== Geographical Indication ==
Radhunipagal Rice received a geographical indication registration in the month of March 2025.

== Bibliography ==
- Registrar of Geographical Indications (30 November 2024). "Geographical Indications Journal 200". Geographical Indications Journal. 200. Geographical Indications Journal.
