= Ambemohar rice =

Variety of short-grained rice

Ambemohar is an aromatic rice variant grown in the foothills of the Western Ghats region of the state of Maharashtra in India.

== History and etymology ==
The word Ambemohar means mango blossom in the Marathi language, which is spoken in the state of Maharashtra where the cultivar originates. The rice has a strong aroma reminiscent of mango blossoms, and has been cultivated in the region for a long time. A century ago about 54,000 tons of the variety was produced in the Mulshi region of the Pune district.

== Production and cultivation ==
The variety is grown in the foothills of the Western Ghats region of the state of Maharashtra in India. It is a low yielding rice (1.9 ton/ha). The grains are short (5.5 mm) and wide (2.2 mm) compared to the well known basmati rice. Both varieties have similar degree of fragrance. The variety is therefore included in the class of Aromatic rice such as Basmati. The short cooked grains have a tendency to break easily and stick together.

The mango blossom like smell of this variety is attributed to a volatile aromatic chemical compound 2-Acetyl-1-pyrroline (2AP).

== Related varieties ==
Ambemohar is low-yielding compared to other varieties of rice, primarily because it is susceptible to diseases. The hybrid called Indrayani with ambemohar parentage was released in 1987. It was developed by Rice Research Centre near Lonavala. Indrayani has also been modified to form new varieties of rice such as Phule Maval and Phule Samrudhi.

== Uses ==
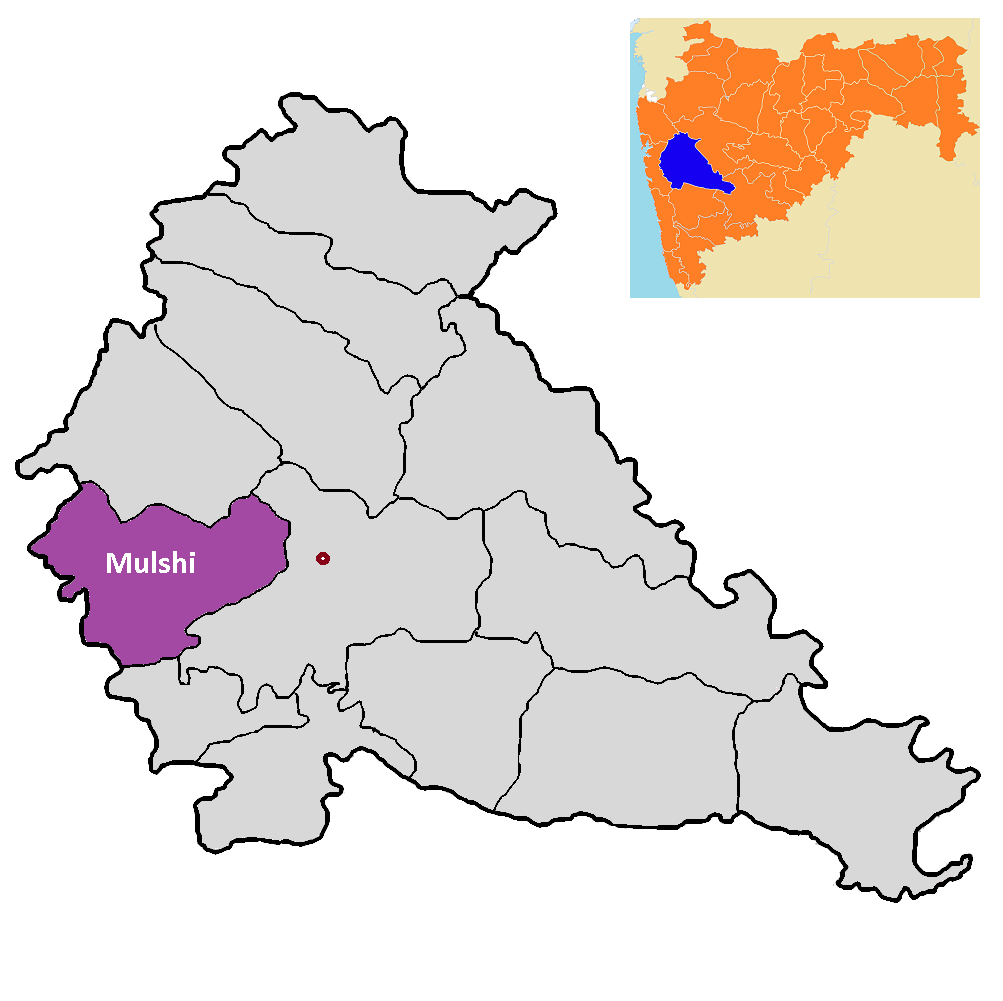
Location of Mulshi Taluka in Pune district

Ambemohar rice is used to prepare a thick soup of rice and milk called ‘Bhatachi Pej’ locally, mainly for children, elderly people and patients. (Rice Kanji). The rice is also used in religious and wedding ceremonies. In Mulshi region of Pune district, it is used for making ‘Vapholya’ - A traditional food item prepared during Makar Sankranti festival. The rice has been used for making soft Idli and crispy dosa. It is also used for making puffed rice called Kurmure in the Marathi language. The bran from the rice is used for oil extraction or for Mushroom cultivation.

This rice is also used to prepare flour for "ukdiche modak" during Ganeshotsav, has surged to a record Rs 220 - 260 per kg which is a significant jump from Rs 150 - 160 in June 2025.

== Geographical indication ==
Mulshi Taluka sub-division of Pune district in the eastern foothills of the Sahyadri range has been granted the Geographical Indication for Ambemohar.

== Lookalikes ==
It is now rare to find farmers who grow Ambemohar regularly. Since the production cost is high, the retail cost in turn has to be high. So, retailers in Maharashtra, pass off lookalikes as original Ambemohar to gain higher profit margins. This has further discouraged the production of Ambemohar, since the farmers can earn more profit themselves by growing lookalikes. Jeera Sambhar rice from Andhra Pradesh and Jawaful from Madhya Pradesh are the most popular lookalikes sold by retailers.

== See also ==
- Basmati rice
- Jasmine rice
- List of rice varieties
- Oryza sativa
- Wehani rice
