= Tulaipanji rice =

Rice cultivar from India

Tulaipanji Rice
- Geographical indication
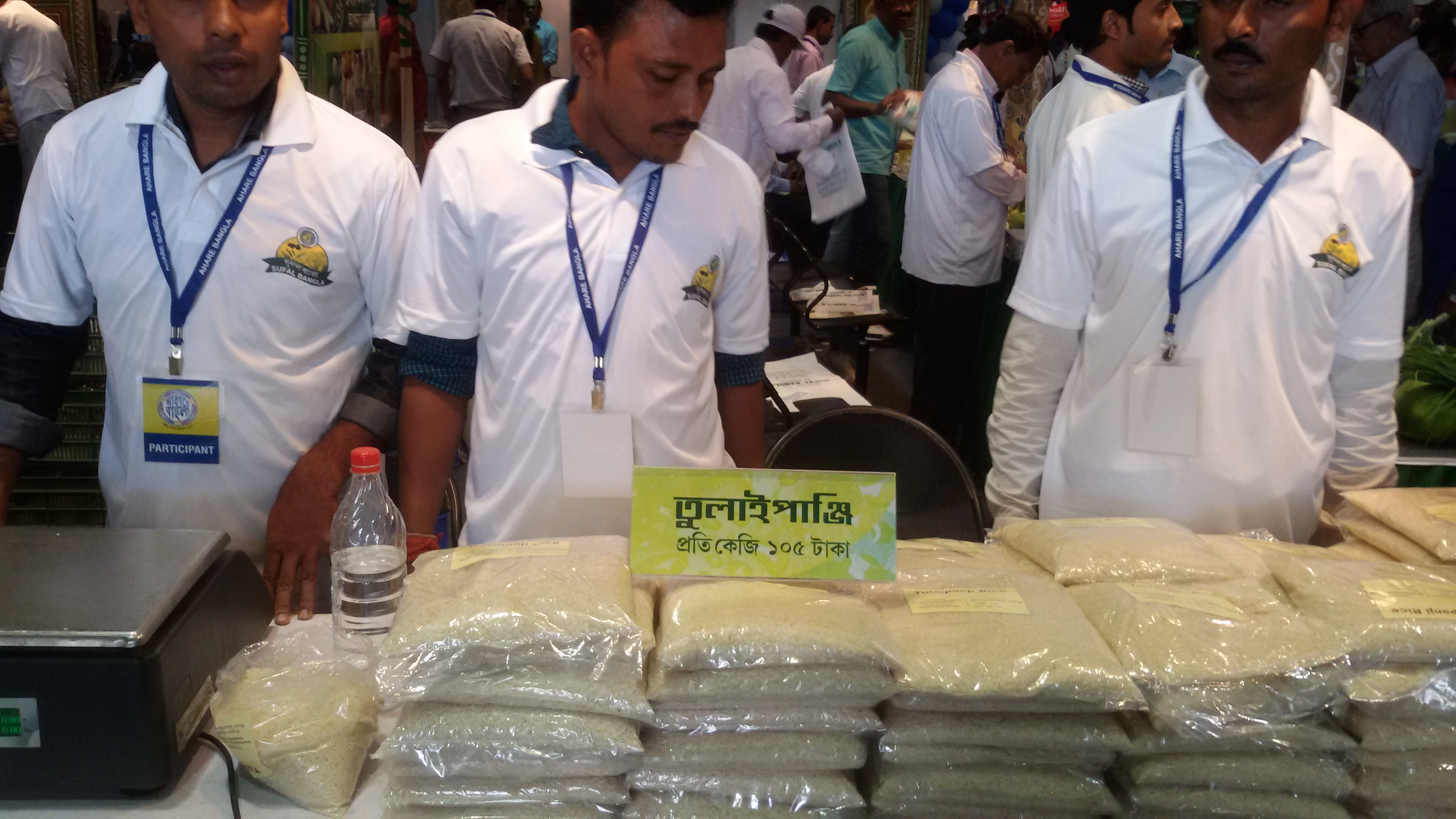
- Tulaipanji rice being sold by Sufal Bangla at Bangiya Khadya Utsav 2015
- Alternative names: তুলাইপাঞ্জি চাল
- Description: Tulaipanji is a aromatic rice cultivated in West Bengal
- Type: West Bengal aromatic rice
- Area: Raiganj subdivision of North Dinajpur district
- Country: India
- Registered: 24 October, 2017
- Official website: ipindiaservices.gov.in

Tulaipanji (Bengali: তুলাইপাঞ্জি) is an Indian rice cultivar from West Bengal, India. It is an indigenous aromatic rice grown mainly in the Raiganj subdivision of Uttar Dinajpur district and some pockets of Dakshin Dinajpur district. In 2012, the Government of West Bengal sent Tulaipanji rice to the food festival at the London Olympics.

Tulaipanji is an indigenous aromatic rice landrace grown mainly in Raiganj sub-division of North Dinajpur district of West Bengal, India. The aroma and quality of this rice variety are strongly associated with its native origin.

Tulaipanji is categorized as 'non-Basmati aromatic rice'. It has medium-long slender grain with an average length of 5.5 mm, length/breadth ratio of 3.4 and elongation ratio of 1.6. Cooked rice is bright in appearance, non-sticky and friable due to high amylose content. Tulaipanji contains amylose – 28.3%, protein – 7.3%. It has comparable quality parameters like 77.1% hulling, 65% milling, 54.2% head rice recovery and alkali value at 4.0.

Traditionally, Tulaipanji is grown without using any fertilizer in mid-land to high-land condition and preferably in jute harvested fields, after rainy season during the August–December period. Low soil fertility and moisture stress generally prevail in the growing field and believed to be the key factor behind the aroma. Inorganic fertilizers are generally not used due to the reduction in aroma and other qualitative parameters.

== Detailed descriptive parameters of Tulaipanji rice ==
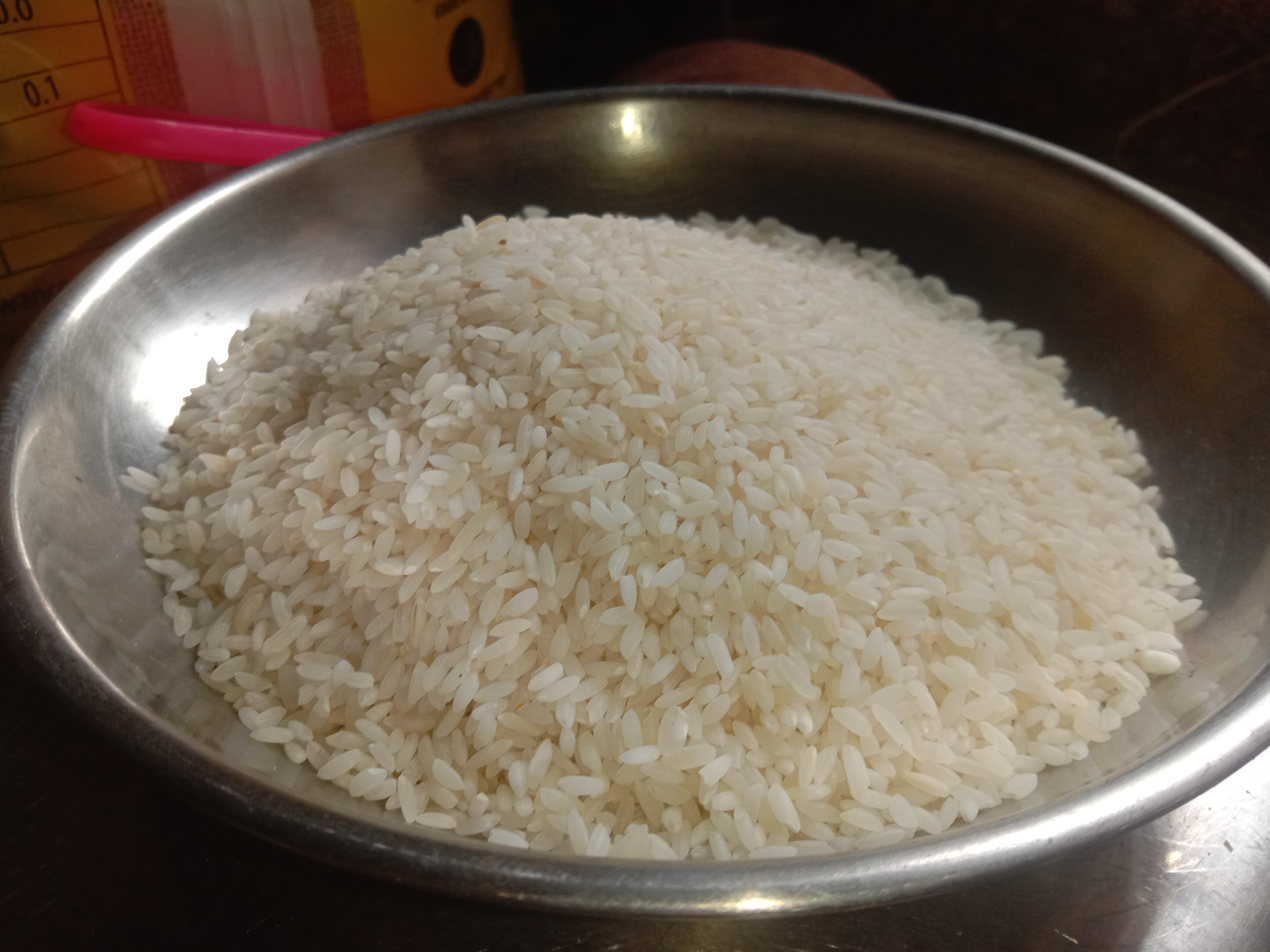
Tulaipanji rice at a Bengali household in India

The Tulaipanji rice when cooked turns out to be whitish-yellow, slender and non-sticky. The rice is valued in the preparation of pulao, fried rice and biryani. Tulaipanji is also known for its disease-pest resistance quality.

Parameter	Value
Kernel length (mm)	5.2
Kernel breadth (mm)	1.8
L/B ratio	2.8
Kernel type	Medium slender
Kernel color	White
Amylose (%)	16.7
Protein (%)	7.1
Elongation ratio	1.7
Aroma	Medium

== Geographical Indication ==
It was registered as a geographical indication in India in 2017.

== See also ==
- Gobindobhog
- Kanakchur
