= Jaynagarer Moa =

Confectionery of West Bengal, India

- Geographical indication
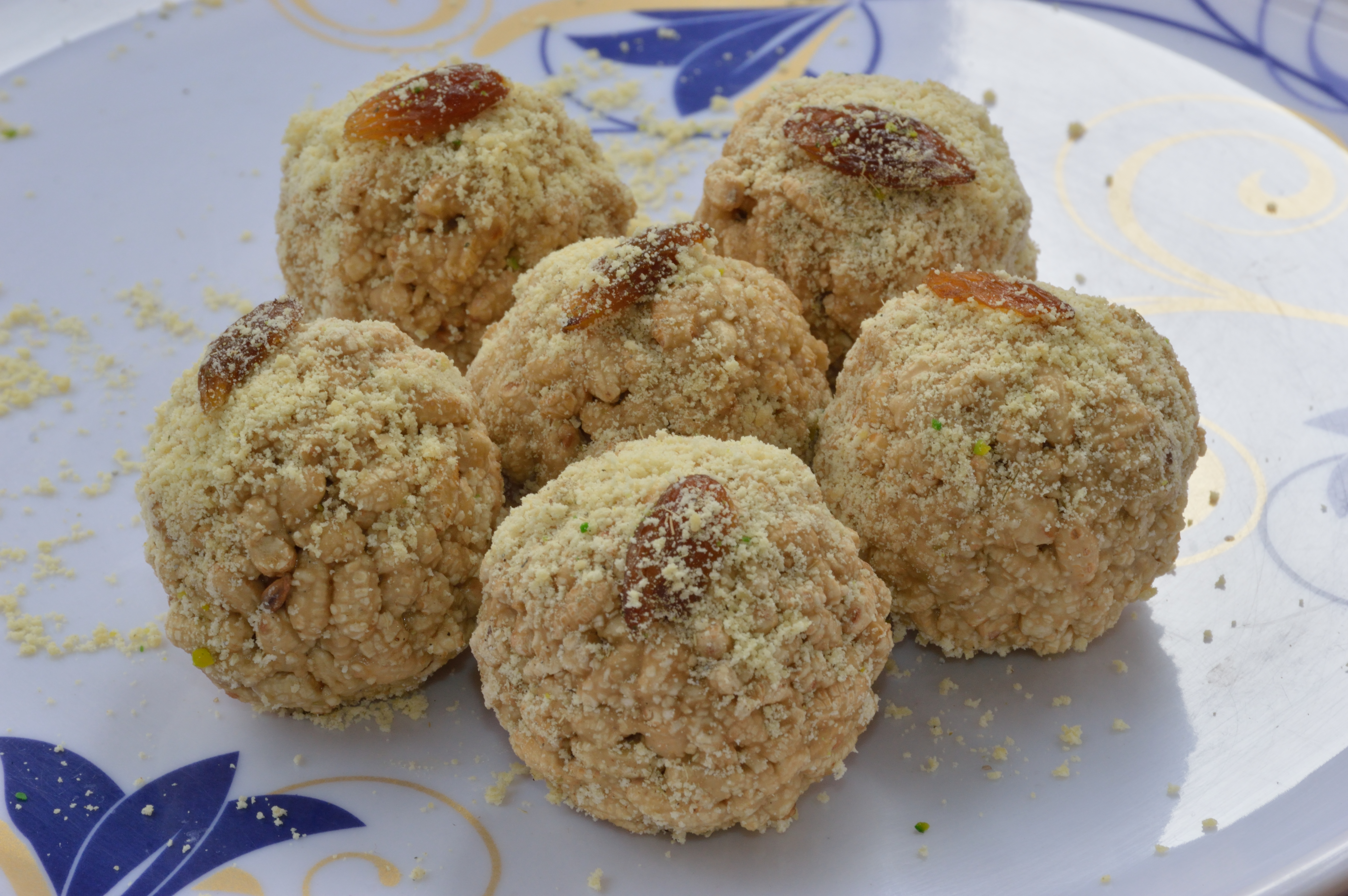
- Jaynagarer Moa
- Alternative names: জয়নগরের মোয়া
- Description: Confectionery of Bengal
- Type: Foodstuff
- Area: Jaynagar Majilpur, South 24 Parganas, West Bengal
- Country: India
- Registered: 23 March 2015; 11 years ago
- Material: Date Palm, Jaggery, Kanakchur Khoi, Gawa Ghee, Cardamom and Poppy Seed
- Official website: https://joynagarermoa.com/

Jaynagarer Moa (Bengali: জয়নগরের মোয়া) is a seasonal Bengali sweetmeat delicacy prepared from date palm jaggery and Kanakchur khoi. This variety of Moa originated in Jaynagar Majilpur of the South 24 Parganas district in the Indian state of West Bengal. It is now a popular sweet, being produced in Kolkata and elsewhere, sometimes with cheaper ingredients and chemical flavours. Jaynagarer Moa was given a Geographical Indication tag in 2015 which will enable the product to be protected from unauthorised use and piracy.

== History ==
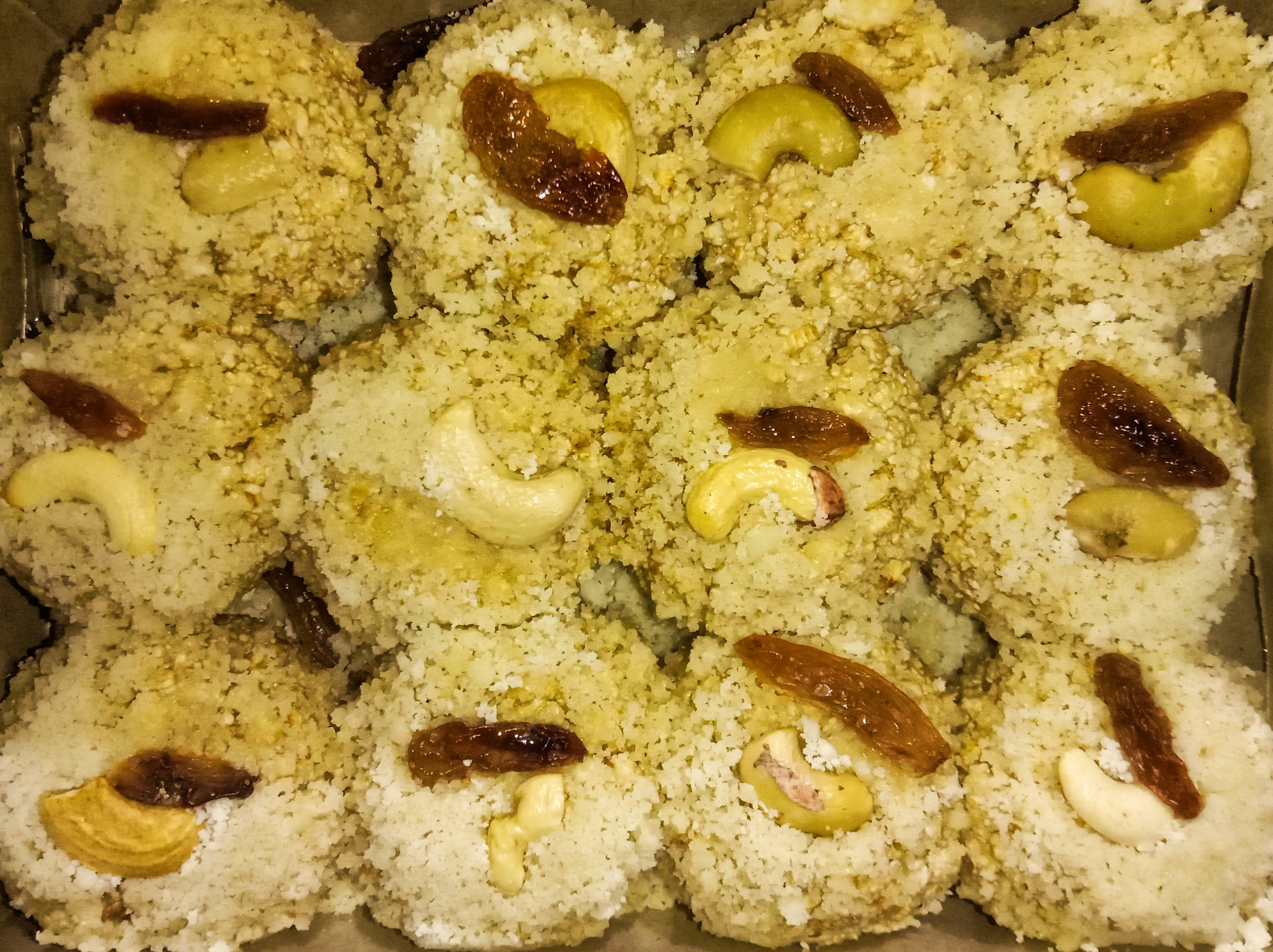
Jaynagarer Moa in West Bengal

In 1920s two friends Purna Chandra Ghosh (aka Purna) and Nityagopal Sarkar (aka Buchki) started selling the Moa in local weekly markets and it came to be known as Buchki's Moa, which later came to be known as Joynagarer Moa. In 1929 Buchki and Purna set up their own sweet shop named Sri Krishna Mistanna Bhandar in Jaynagar Majilpur Town, near Jaynagar Majilpur railway station. The shop is still in operation and is managed by the granddaughter of Ghosh.

== Recipe ==
Jaynagarer Moa is made with Nolen Gur (jaggery made from date palm tree extract with exquisite taste and aroma), Kanakchur khoi (a form of popped rice made from a special variety of aromatic rice), Gawa ghee (a type of clarified butter made from cow's milk), elach (cardamom), and posto (poppy seed). Both Nolen Gur and Kanakchur rice are winter products (available around November to January) and hence Jaynagarer Moa is available during this period only. The ordinary or common Moa is a small crispy ball made of puffed rice ("Muri" rather than "Khoi") and jaggery. It is produced in homes all over Bengal and is also generally available in grocery shops in small plastic packets, throughout the year.

There are over 250 sweetmeat shops around Jaynagar, which produce Jaynagarer Moa with the original ingredients.

== Challenges ==
The popularity of the dish has led in recent years to sweetmeat makers all over West Bengal, particularly Kolkata, producing large quantities of Jaynagarer Moa using cheaper ingredients flavoured with chemical aromatics and marketing them as Jaynagarer Moa.

Since 2013, date palm jaggery became harder to come by due to the decrease in the number of date palms in West Bengal and the shift of members of the Shiuli community, traditional producers of "Nolen Gur" from date palm juice, to other professions. Similarly, Kanakchur rice is a local variant which grows only in winter and through traditional fertiliser-free techniques only.
