= Kanakchur =

Aromatic rice from West Bengal, India

Kanakchur (Bengali: কনকচূড়) is an aromatic rice cultivar from West Bengal, India. It has a slender grain and sweet aroma. The popped rice prepared from Kanakchur retains the aroma. The popped Kanakchur and Nalen Gur is used to prepare the Jaynagarer Moa.

== See also ==
- Jaynagarer Moa
- Gobindobhog
