= Lundberg Family Farms =

Farm in Richvale, California

Coordinates: 39°29′59″N 121°44′53″W

Lundberg Family Farms, based in Richvale, California, United States, is a farm that produces rice and rice cakes. They also market organic foods. It is family owned and they have been committed to organic farming, especially rice products. It was the first business to produce and market a brand of organic rice in the United States. Today it is one of the United States' top brands of organic products, with 14,000 acres (57 km^{2}) under management.

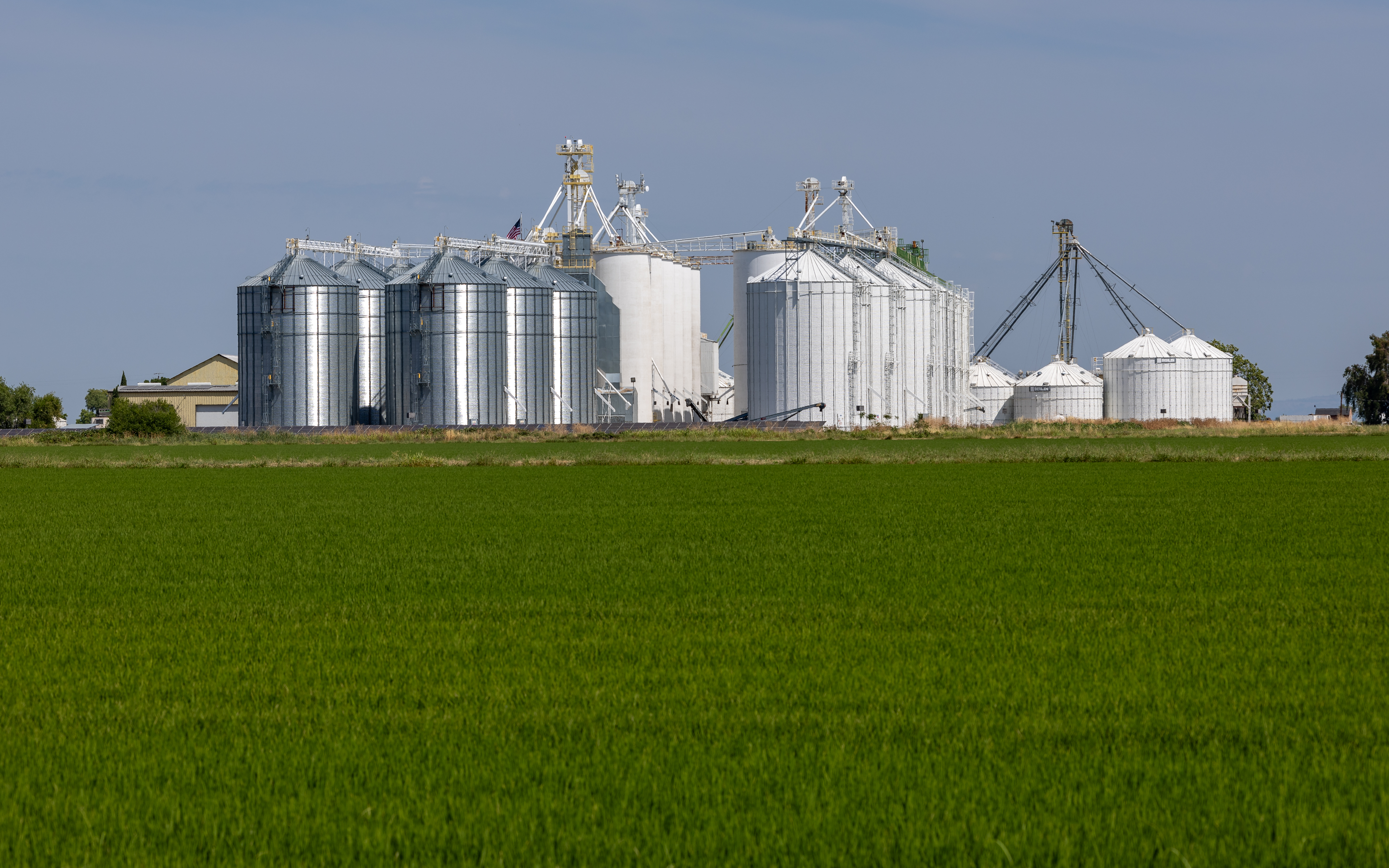
Lundberg Family Farms in Richvale, Butte County, California; rice fields in the foreground

== History ==
Albert and Frances Lundberg, the grandparents of the current Lundbergs, traveled west to Richvale, California, in 1937 from Nebraska, seeking their fortunes out west after the Great Depression. In Nebraska they had farmed wheat and corn, but they found that their 40 acres (160,000 m^{2}) of hard clay in California were better suited for rice. Since the beginning they have been early pioneers in ecologically sound agriculture. While Albert Lundberg's neighbors were burning leftover rice stalks, for example, Albert devised a way to plow those stalks back into the field as fertilizer. Because of this early focus, the Lundbergs were the first American farmers to market a brand of organic rice products. In order to accomplish this, Albert's sons Wendell, Eldon, Harlan, and Homer had to build their own mill and establish a company which they called Wehah Farm, after their initials.

The Lundbergs have grown from 40 acres (160,000 m^{2}) to their current 14,000 acres (57 km^{2}) since their inception.

== Business model ==
Lundberg Family Farms is uncommonly large among organic farms. It is also vertically integrated (meaning that the systems for producing, handling, and distributing their products is also owned by Lundberg Family Farms), as many corporate agribusinesses are. It owns about 5,000 acres (20 km^{2}) and contracts for another 9,000 acres (36 km^{2}). Around 70 percent is farmed organically, but the company calls the remainder "eco-farmed", which means that it is farmed with pesticides and fertilizers that are carefully chosen for minimal environmental damage. On the eco-farmed portion they use one insecticide, eight selected herbicides, some conventional fertilizers, and fewer cover crops. The conventional methods mean less labor and less cost, allowing the company to compete in conventional markets.

The company is still owned by the Lundberg family.

== Sustainability ==
The Lundbergs have been consistently recognized for their efforts in sustainability. In 2004 Lundberg Family Farms was awarded the Green Power Leadership Award by the Environmental Protection Agency of the United States for offsetting 100% of its power with wind energy certificates, making it one of the largest purchasers in California and the first organic food manufacturer to do so.

The company is currently a member of the EPA's Green Power Partnership where it is listed as the only agribusiness running on 100% green power.
