= Richvale, California =

Richvale
- census-designated place
- Location in California
- Coordinates: 39°29′38″N 121°44′41″W
- Country: United States
- State: California
- County: Butte

Area
  - Total: 0.927 sq mi (2.401 km^{2})
  - Land: 0.927 sq mi (2.401 km^{2})
  - Water: 0 sq mi (0 km^{2}) 0%
- Elevation: 108 ft (33 m)

Population (2020)
  - Total: 234
  - Density: 252/sq mi (97.5/km^{2})
- Time zone: UTC-8 (Pacific (PST))
  - Summer (DST): UTC-7 (PDT)
- ZIP Code: 95974
- Area codes: 530, 837
- GNIS feature IDs: 231556; 2612486

Richvale (also, Richland, Silbys Switch, Silsby) is a small village (population 234) in Butte County, California, United States, south of Chico and west of Oroville. The primary crop grown in the area surrounding Richvale is rice, irrigated from the Oroville Dam on the Feather River. Several farmers in the area are known for organic farming. The population was 234 at the 2020 census.

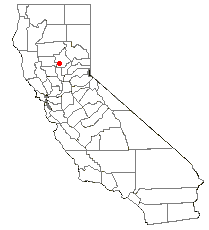
Location of Richvale, California

The ZIP Code is 95974. The community is served by area code 530.

== History ==
Legend says that the name "Richvale" (meaning "fertile valley") was coined by con men to sell worthless plots of land to wheat farmers from Nebraska and Kansas. The developers (Richvale Land Company) changed the name from Selby Switch (a railroad siding) to Richvale in 1909. The place was settled in 1911, and a post office opened that same year.

Farmers in the Midwest were shown lush pictures of California's Sacramento Valley and San Joaquin Valley and sold land at outrageous prices. The soil near Richvale is nothing like the fertile soil of the San Joaquin Valley, being composed mostly of clay instead of loam. The dominant soil is Esquon clay, a poorly drained vertisol. The locals call the soil "adobe" due to its high clay content. The land is unsuitable for vineyards, orchards, and most other crops. Some buyers took one look at the soil and returned to the Midwest. Those who stayed built a community from the muddy ground up: a post office (1912), roads, an irrigation and drainage district, a hotel (1913), a church (1913), a cooperative (1914 and still operating, the Butte County Rice Growers Association), a school (1914), and a grocery store (1920). During a second wave of migration Dust Bowl farmers came west during the Great Depression.

Due to the adobe soil's ability to retain water and remain flooded, the ground makes a near-ideal rice paddy, and rice has become the primary crop of the area. Irrigation is provided by plentiful surface water from the Feather River.

In 2005, 33,500 acres (136 km^{2}) of rice were served by the Butte County Rice Growers Association. Current storage capacity is 3,200,000 short hundredweight (150,000 t). With time and a lot of hard work, the town of Richvale lived up to its name as rice farming provided an abundant livelihood for the original settlers and their offspring.

The history of Richvale was recently written by the Richvale Writing Group (with Teresa Ward) and published by The Community Foundation of Richvale in a book (Richvale: A Legacy of Courage, Dedication, and Perseverance) with 364 historical photographs.

== Geography ==
Richvale is located at 39° 29' 38" North, 121° 44' 41" West at a mean elevation of 108 feet (33 m) above sea level.

== Demographics ==
Historical population
Census	Pop.	Note	%±
2010	244		—
2020	234		−4.1%
U.S. Decennial Census; 2010

Richvale first appeared as a census designated place in the 2010 U.S. census.

The 2020 United States census reported that Richvale had a population of 234. The population density was 252.4 inhabitants per square mile (97.5/km^{2}). The racial makeup of Richvale was 198 (84.6%) White, 4 (1.7%) African American, 1 (0.4%) Native American, 1 (0.4%) Asian, 0 (0.0%) Pacific Islander, 11 (4.7%) from other races, and 19 (8.1%) from two or more races. Hispanic or Latino of any race were 33 persons (14.1%).

The whole population lived in households. There were 83 households, out of which 26 (31.3%) had children under the age of 18 living in them, 40 (48.2%) were married-couple households, 7 (8.4%) were cohabiting couple households, 15 (18.1%) had a female householder with no partner present, and 21 (25.3%) had a male householder with no partner present. 21 households (25.3%) were one person, and 10 (12.0%) were one person aged 65 or older. The average household size was 2.82. There were 56 families (67.5% of all households).

The age distribution was 58 people (24.8%) under the age of 18, 19 people (8.1%) aged 18 to 24, 44 people (18.8%) aged 25 to 44, 55 people (23.5%) aged 45 to 64, and 58 people (24.8%) who were 65 years of age or older. The median age was 39.0 years. For every 100 females, there were 125.0 males.

There were 94 housing units at an average density of 101.4 units per square mile (39.2 units/km^{2}), of which 83 (88.3%) were occupied. Of these, 70 (84.3%) were owner-occupied, and 13 (15.7%) were occupied by renters.

== Education ==
The CDP is served by the Biggs Unified School District.

== Places of interest ==
- Richvale Airport, 1764 Richvale Highway
- Richvale Cafe, 5285 Midway- Closed
- Richvale Community Church, 5219 Church Street
- Richvale Elementary School, 5236 Church Street
- Richvale Fire Department, 1236 School Street
- Richvale Post Office (ZIP Code 95974), 5205 Church Street
- Lundberg Family Farms, 5311 Midway
- Butte County Rice Growers Association, 1193 Richvale Highway

== Notable people ==
- Doug LaMalfa (1960–2026), U.S. Representative of California's 1st congressional district
