= Himsagar =

Edible fruit cultivar

Mangifera 'Himsagar'
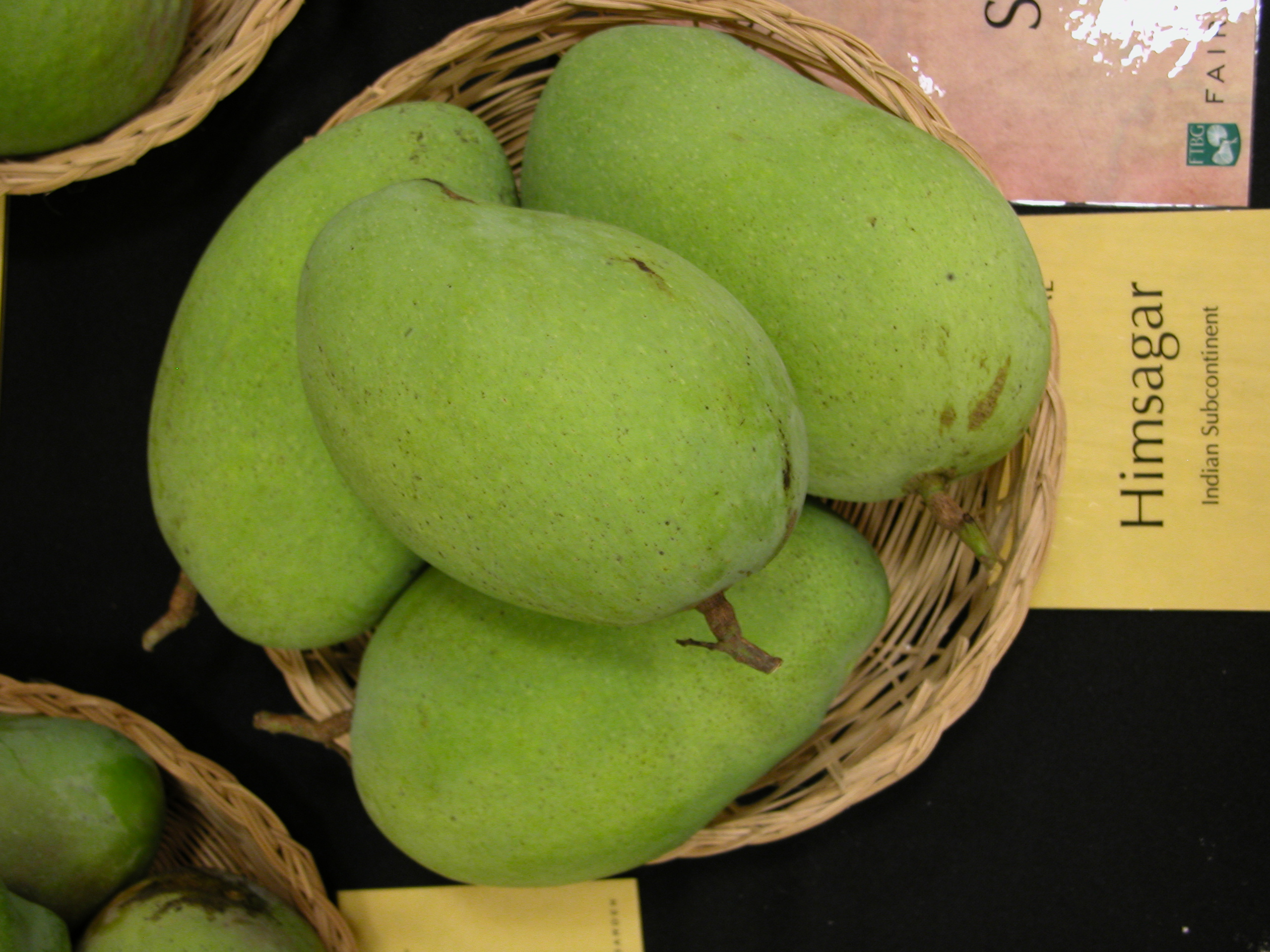
- 'Himsagar' mangoes on display at the 15th Annual International Mango Festival in Florida, United States in 2007
- Genus: Mangifera
- Species: Mangifera indica
- Cultivar: 'Himsagar'
- Origin: Bengal

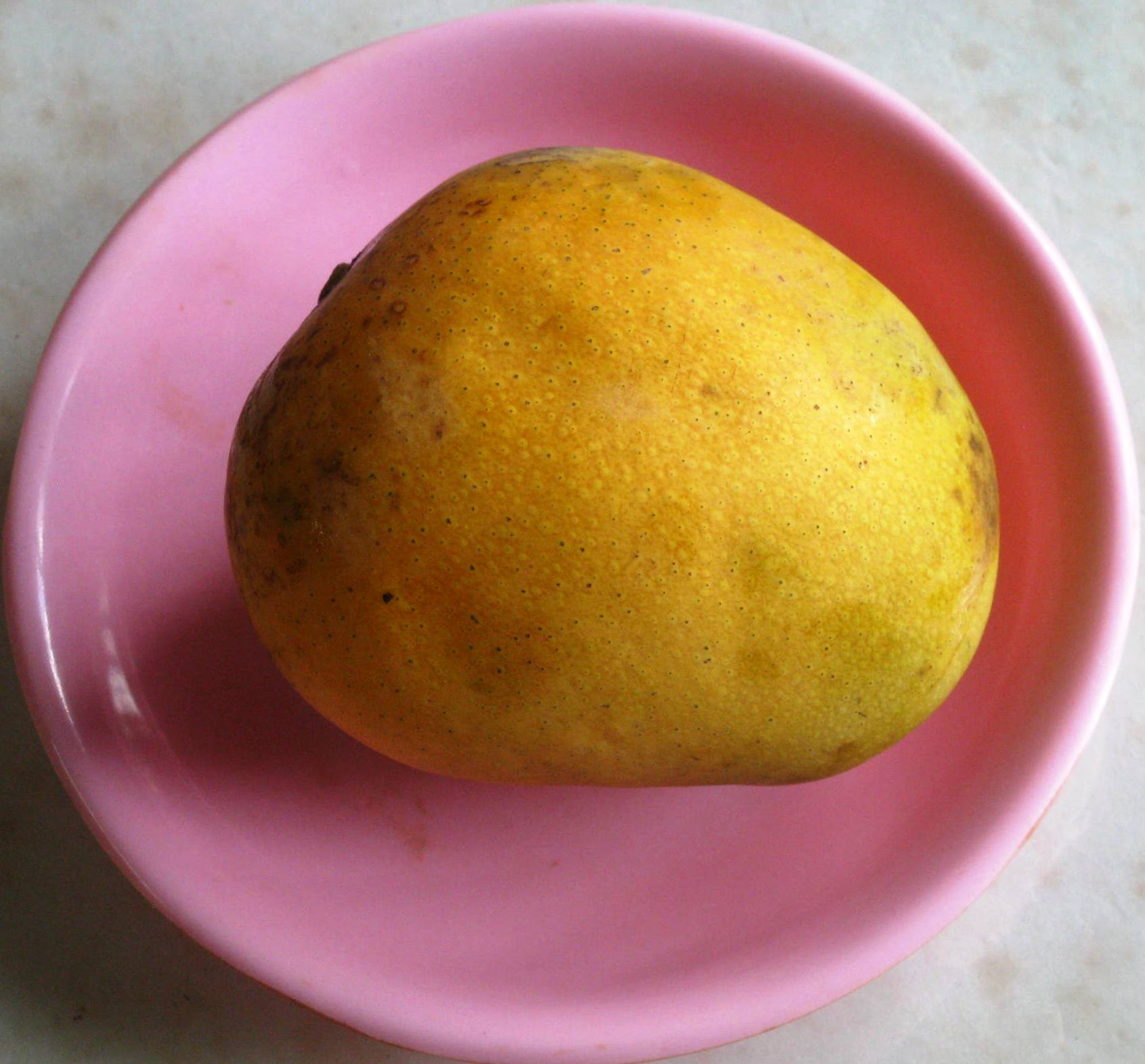
A 'Himsagar' mango

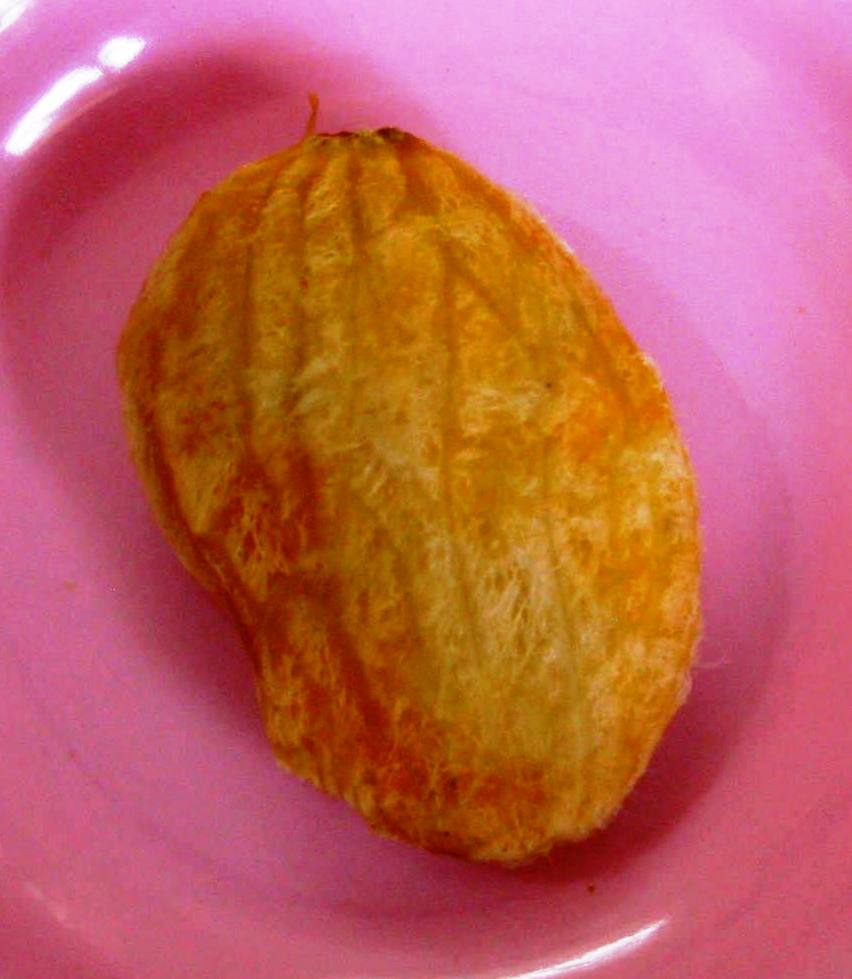
'Himsagar' mango stone (seed)

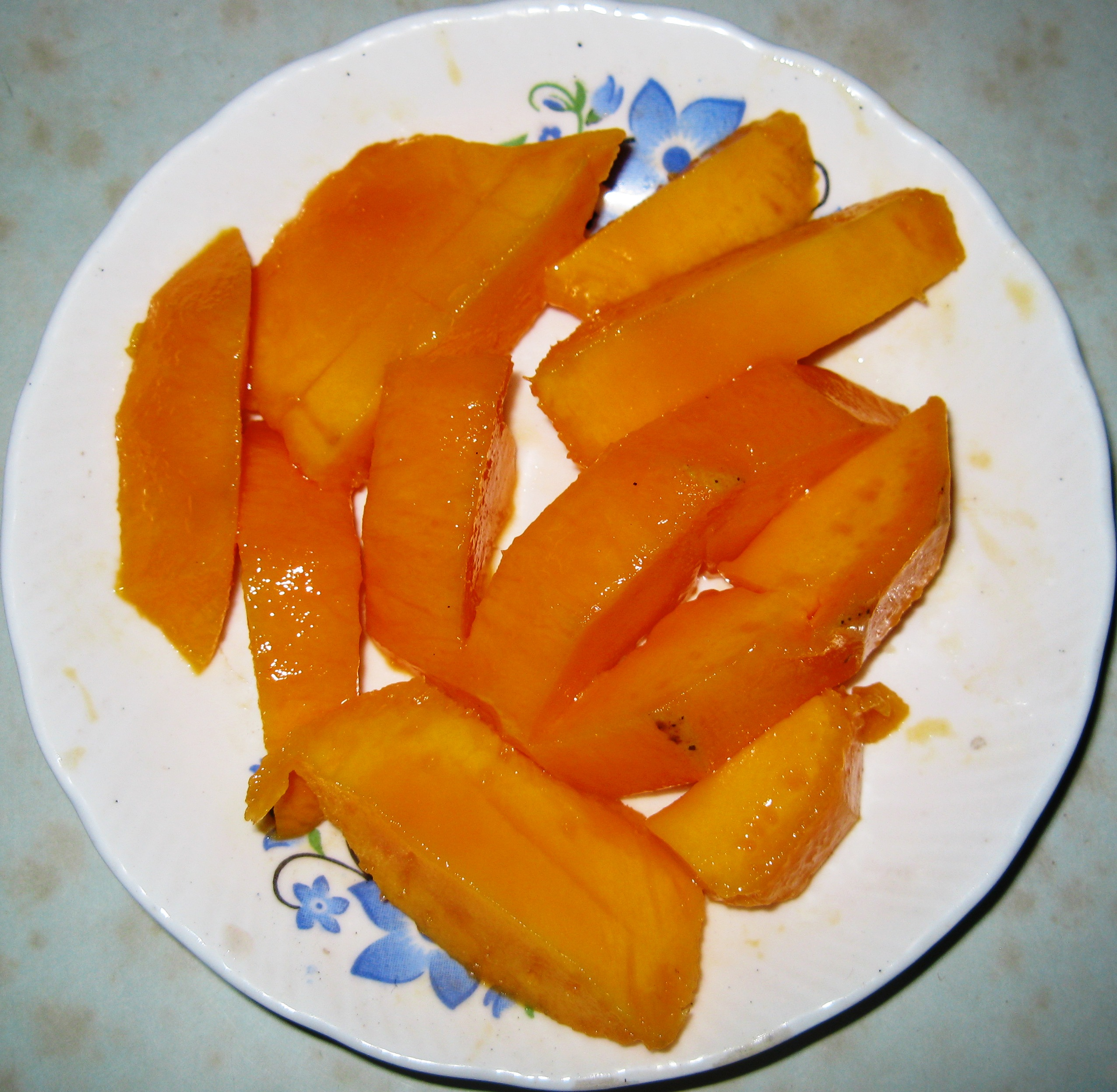
'Himsagar' mango (sliced)

The Himsagar (Bengali: হিমসাগর, romanized: Himsāgar) mango is a mango cultivar, originating in the modern-day Bangladesh and state of West Bengal in India. A very popular variety in India and Bangladesh, the inside of Himsagar is yellow to orange in colour and does not have any fibre. The fruit is medium-sized and weighs between 250 and 350 grams, out of which the pulp content is around 77%. It has a good keeping quality. It is also known as Khirsapati.

Himsagar ripens in May and it is available in the market from the second week of May to the end of June. It is also known as Kishan Bhog in Bihar. It is mainly grown in the Chapai Nawabganj district of Bangladesh and the Malda, Murshidabad, Nadia, Hooghly districts of West Bengal, India. This cultivar is registered under the protected Geographical Indication index with G.I. Registration No. 112.
