= Shataranji =

Traditional handicrafts of the Rangpur region and GI product of Bangladesh

Shatranji
- Geographical indication
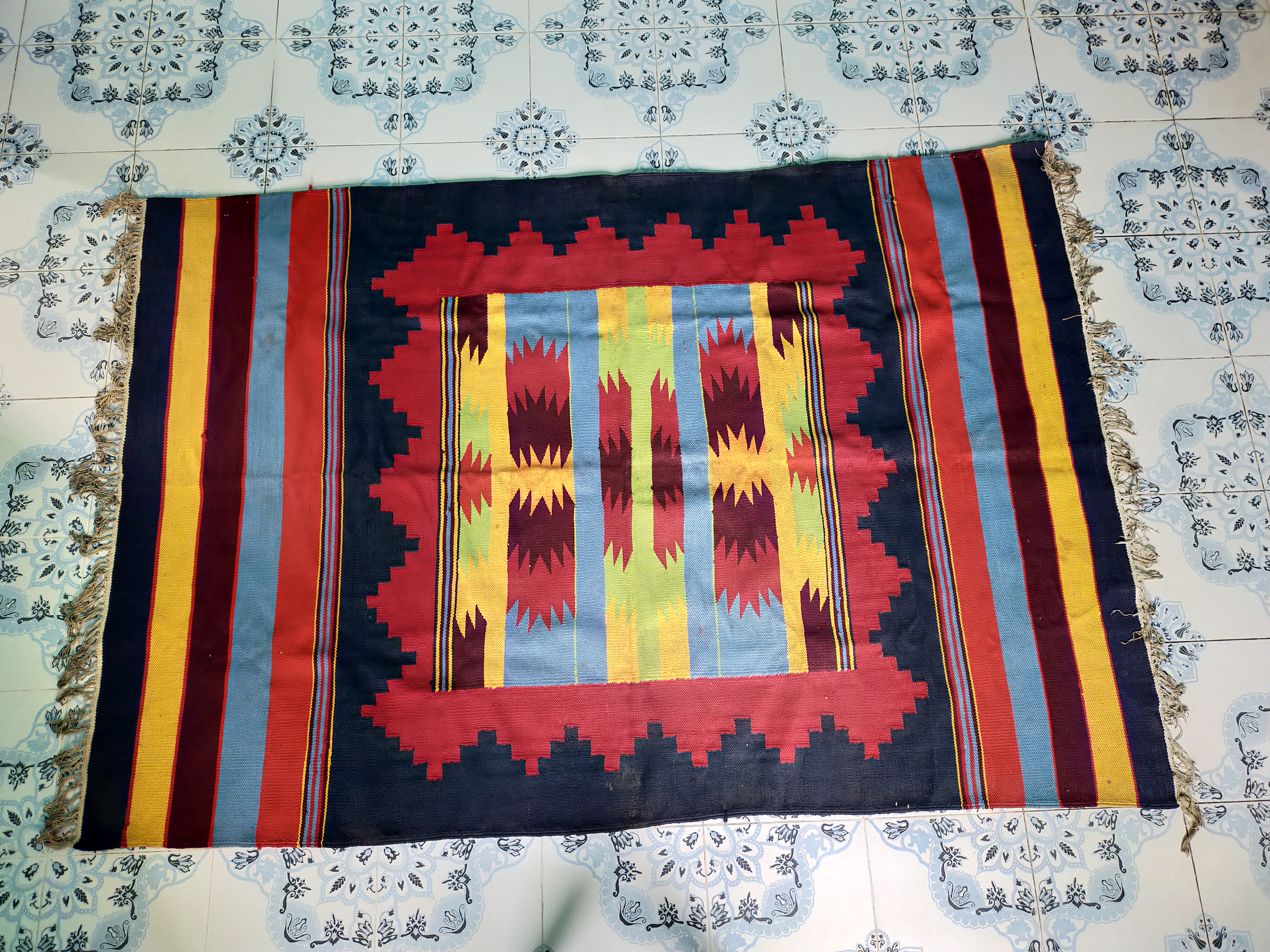
- Shataranji, a traditional handicraft of the Rangpur region and GI product of Bangladesh
- Description: A traditional handicraft of Rangpur region of Bangladesh
- Country: Bangladesh
- Material: Fabric

Shataranji (Bengali: শতরঞ্জি) is a weaving technique traditionally used in the Rangpur region of Bangladesh. In 2021, it was declared a Geographical Indication Product of Bangladesh. It is used to produce carpets that are fashionable, artistic, and practical, especially when used as a blanket. Due to the expense involved in its production, Shataranji has historically been considered a symbol of aristocracy.

== History ==
Shataranji is believed to date back to the Mughal Empire by locals, however, the exact origin of Shataranji is unknown. The weaving techniques are passed down from generation to generation among the same weaver families. In the 1830s, Ms. Nisbet, a British civil servant and then Collector of Rangpur, visited the village of Peerpur, nearby Rangpur. This led to his discovery of local villages where locals weaved using Shataranji. Impressed by the product, Nisbet used his government influence to promote it; the region was named Nisbetganj in his honor. During British rule, Shataranji carpets became commonplace throughout the Indian subcontinent, being exported to various locations in Sri Lanka, Burma, Indonesia, Thailand and Malaysia. After the Partition of India, Shataranji started losing popularity, nearly becoming extinct. It has seen a resurgence in the past few decades due to demand increase, the appreciation for handloom process and increased marketing.

== Weaving style ==
Shataranji is a handloom process; no modern technology is used. The most common materials used to weave Shataranji are cotton yarn, jute yarn, wool, among others. Ropes made out of fibers are woven in geometrical patterns, typically measured by hand. During this process, specialized techniques and different colors are used to create unique geometrical patterns and designs. Designs represent the weaver's own expertise, techniques, and style, and typically draw on local traditions from Bangladesh and northern India.

Typically, a Shataranji measures at least 30 x 20 inches, with the largest being 30 x 20 feet. A 6 x 9 foot carpet requires two workers to work for two full days, while a 1.5 x 3-foot carpet requires one weaver to work for 3 hours.
