= Tulshimala rice =

Geographical Indications in Bangladesh

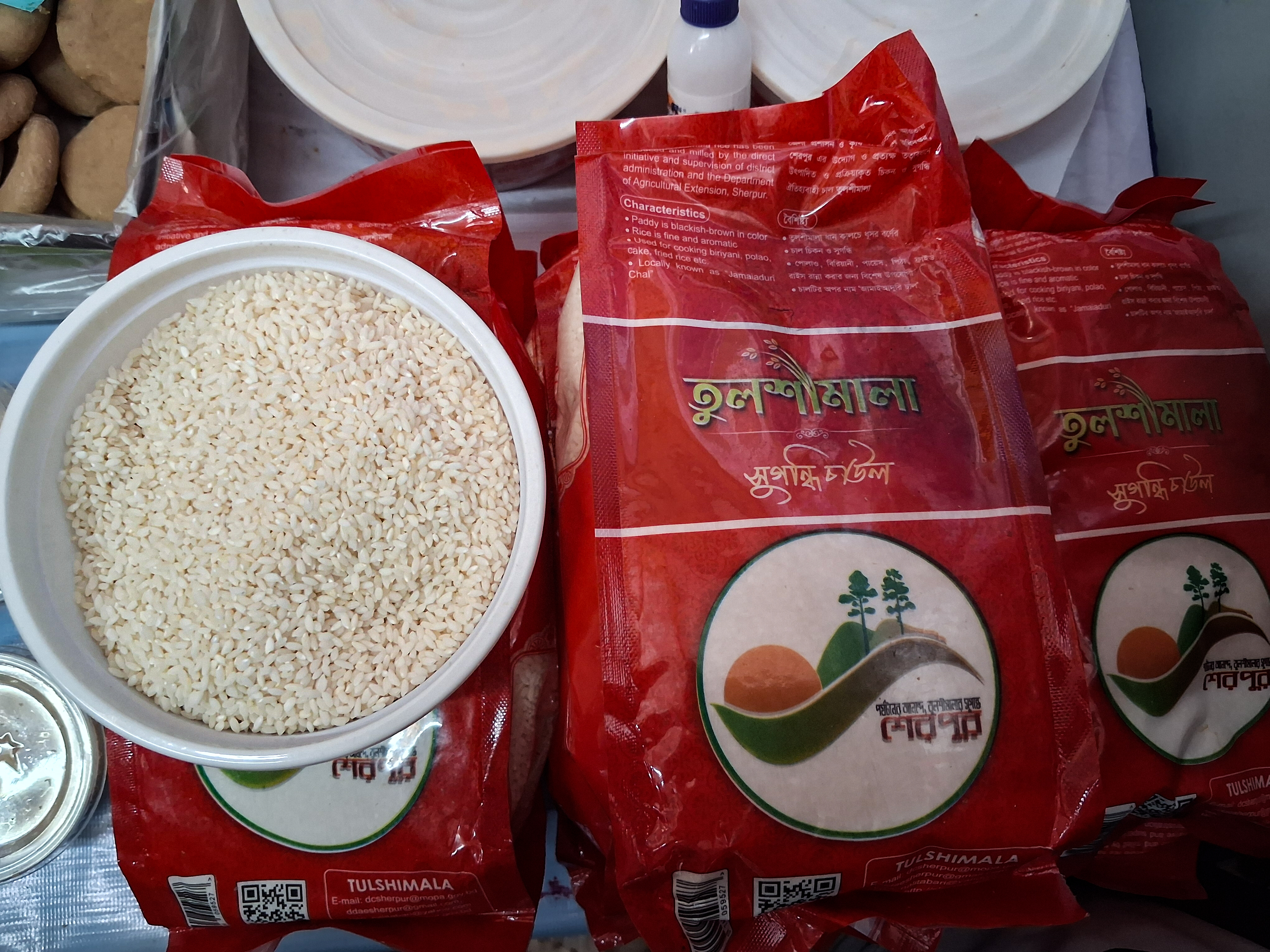
Tulshimala rice, The Market of Tradition 2025

Tulshimala is a photoperiod-sensitive Aman variety of rice. It is planted from the last week of July to the first week of August. Flowers bloom from the end of October to mid-November. Harvesting takes place from the first to the last week of December (mid-Ogrohayon to early Poush). Without a plant protection measure, the yield is 2.50 to 2.75 metric tons per hectare, and with plant protection measures, the yield is 3.00 to 3.25 metric tons per hectare. The maturity period is 125-140 days (depending on the variety and yield). The rice is dark gray in color. The average weight of 1000 grains is 11 grams (dry grain). On April 11, 2018, the Sherpur District Administration filed an application for Geographical Indication (GI) registration of Tulashimala rice with the Department of Patents, Designs, and Trademarks (DPDT). After completing all the necessary procedures, Tulashimala rice from Sherpur was registered as the 14th Geographical Indication product in the country on June 12, 2023.

== Quality ==
Tulshimala rice plants typically grow to a height of 110-185 cm. On average, each plant has 8-10 tillers. The average length of the panicle is 22-24 cm, which can be longer when propagated through balling. Each panicle contains an average of 140-180 grains. This variety is drought-resistant. It is commonly cultivated by farmers as an aman variety. It is particularly suitable for areas prone to sudden floods. Balling, a method of replanting rice plants in the same field, generally reduces the incidence of diseases and pests. The plants are also less prone to lodging. Since balling results in taller seedlings, they can be transplanted in standing water up to 1.5 feet deep.

== Uses ==
This fragrant, smooth, and delicious rice is a versatile ingredient, ideal for preparing dishes such as pilaf, biryani, kheer, khichri, plain rice, pitha, and fried rice.

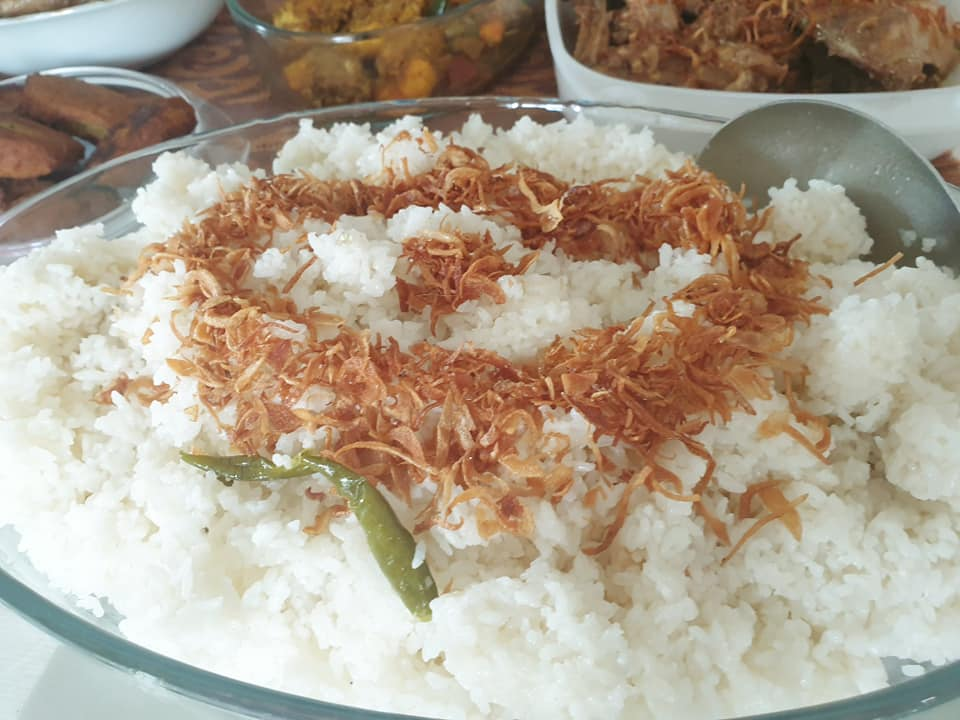
Pilaf made with fragrant Tulshimala rice

The fame and prosperity of Sherpur's Tulshimala rice dates back hundreds of years. Recently, Sherpur district has branded its fragrant rice as Tulshimala. Although various districts in the country produce different varieties of fragrant rice, Sherpur's fragrant Tulshimala rice is unique in terms of quality, standard, and aroma. The practice of gifting fragrant Tulshimala rice to relatives during festivals and serving it as pulao to welcome new sons-in-law is a cherished tradition in Sherpur district. This rice, often called "son-in-law's favorite rice", is renowned for its exceptional taste and aroma.

== See also ==
- List of geographical indications in Bangladesh
- Kataribhog rice
- International Rice Research Institute
