= Fazli (mango) =

Edible fruit cultivar

Mangifera 'Fazli'
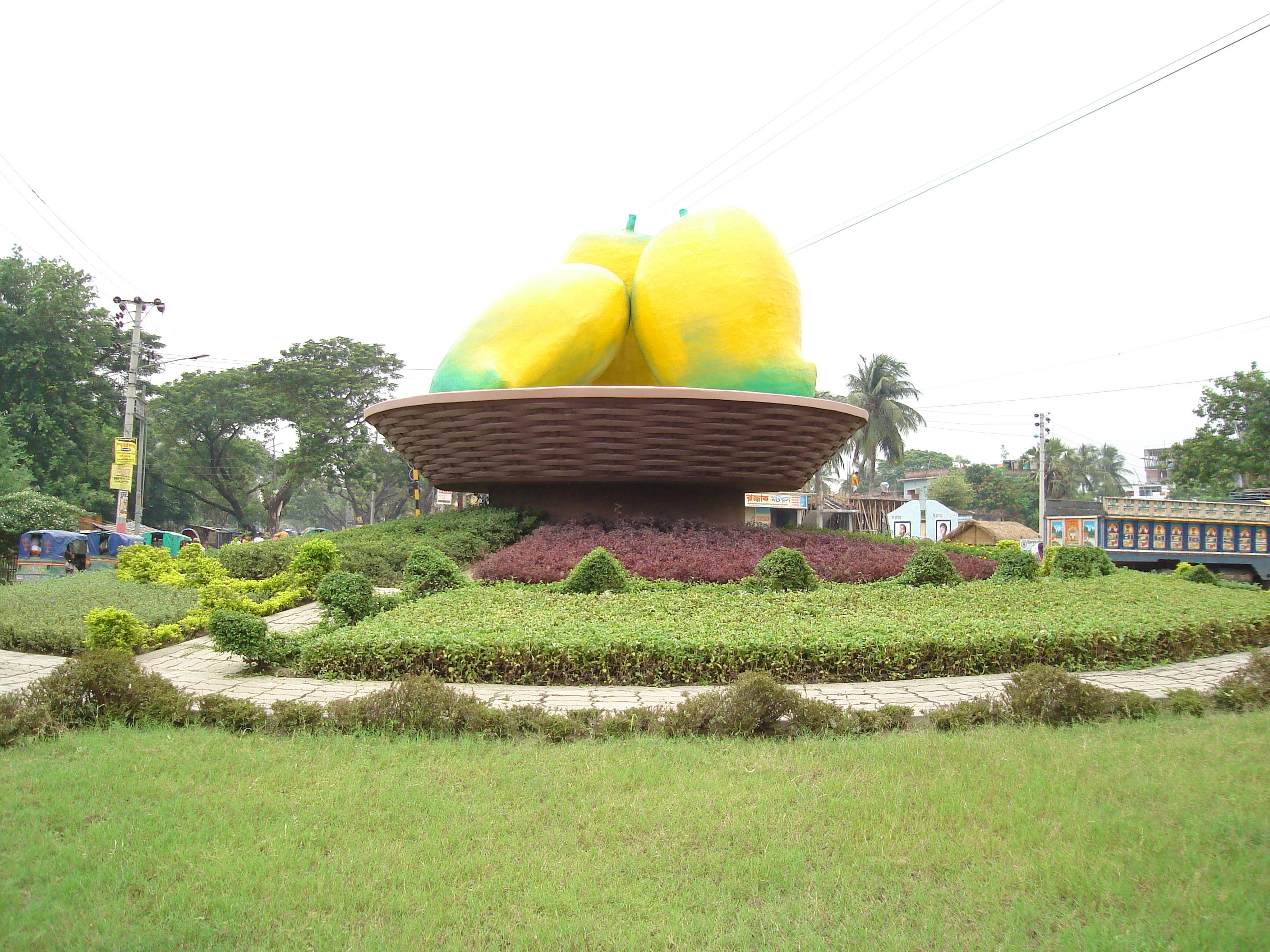
- A roundabout depicting the Fazli Mango in Rajshahi
- Genus: Mangifera
- Species: Mangifera indica
- Cultivar: 'Fazli'
- Origin: Bangladesh, India

The 'Fazli' mango is a mango cultivar primarily grown in Malda and Murshidabad in West Bengal, India and Rajshahi Division in Bangladesh. It is a late maturing fruit, available after other varieties. Fazlis are commonly used in jams and pickles in the cuisine of the Indian subcontinent. Each Fazli mango can be quite large, weighing up to a kilogram. Rajshahi Division in Bangladesh is the major producers of Fazli. An important commercial variety, it is increasingly being exported.

In 2009, India filed a Geographical Indication for the name Fazli, but this is likely to be shared with Bangladesh. There is a dispute over this issue regarding registration to the WTO manual by India. In 2021, another Geographical indication status was given to Bangladesh.
