= Gobindobhog rice =

Type of rice

Gobindobhog Rice
- Geographical indication
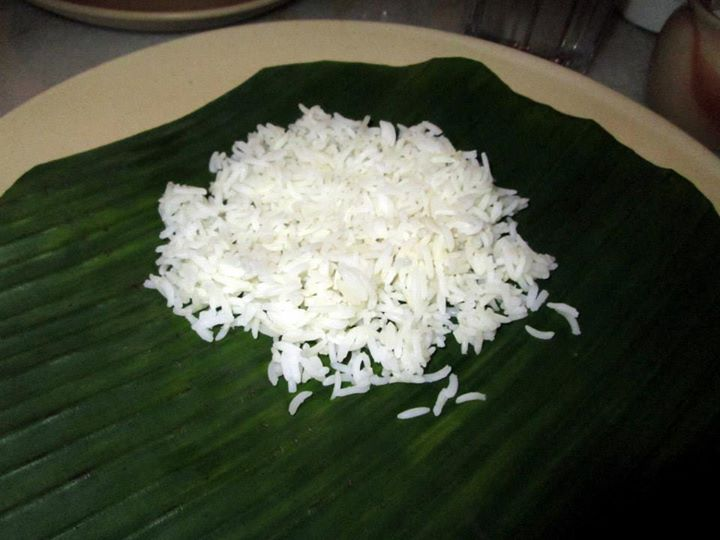
- Gobindobhog rice on banana leaf
- Alternative names: গোবিন্দভোগ চাল
- Description: Gobindobhog is an aromatic rice cultivated in West Bengal
- Type: Aromatic rice
- Area: Bardhaman, Hooghly, Nadia and Birbhum
- Country: India
- Registered: 24 october, 2017
- Official website: ipindiaservices.gov.in

Gobindobhog (Bengali: গোবিন্দভোগ) is a rice cultivated mostly in West Bengal in India. It is a short grain, white, aromatic, sticky rice having a sweet buttery flavor.

== Etymology ==
It derives its name from its usage as the principal ingredient in the preparation of the offerings to Govindaji, the family deity of the Setts of Kolkata.

== Cultivation ==
Gobindobhog was traditionally cultivated in the districts of Bardhaman, Hooghly, Nadia and Birbhum. Later, it began to be cultivated in Bankura and Purulia.

It is also grown in other states. For instance:

- In Bihar it is cultivated in Kaimur, naugachia and other rice bowl areas.
- In Northern Districts of Chhattisgarh it is cultivated in Sarguja Division and is called Vishnu Bhog or Govind Bhog. It is known to have been the favorite rice of Hon' President of India Dr. Rajendra Prasad, where King of Sarguja regularly sent it to the Rashtrapati Bhavan, Delhi from Ambikapur.

== Geographical indication ==
In August 2017, Gobindobhog rice was officially granted the geographical indication by the Government of India.

It has many traditional Bengali recipes intended for it specifically.
