= Kataribhog rice =

Geographical Indications in Bangladesh

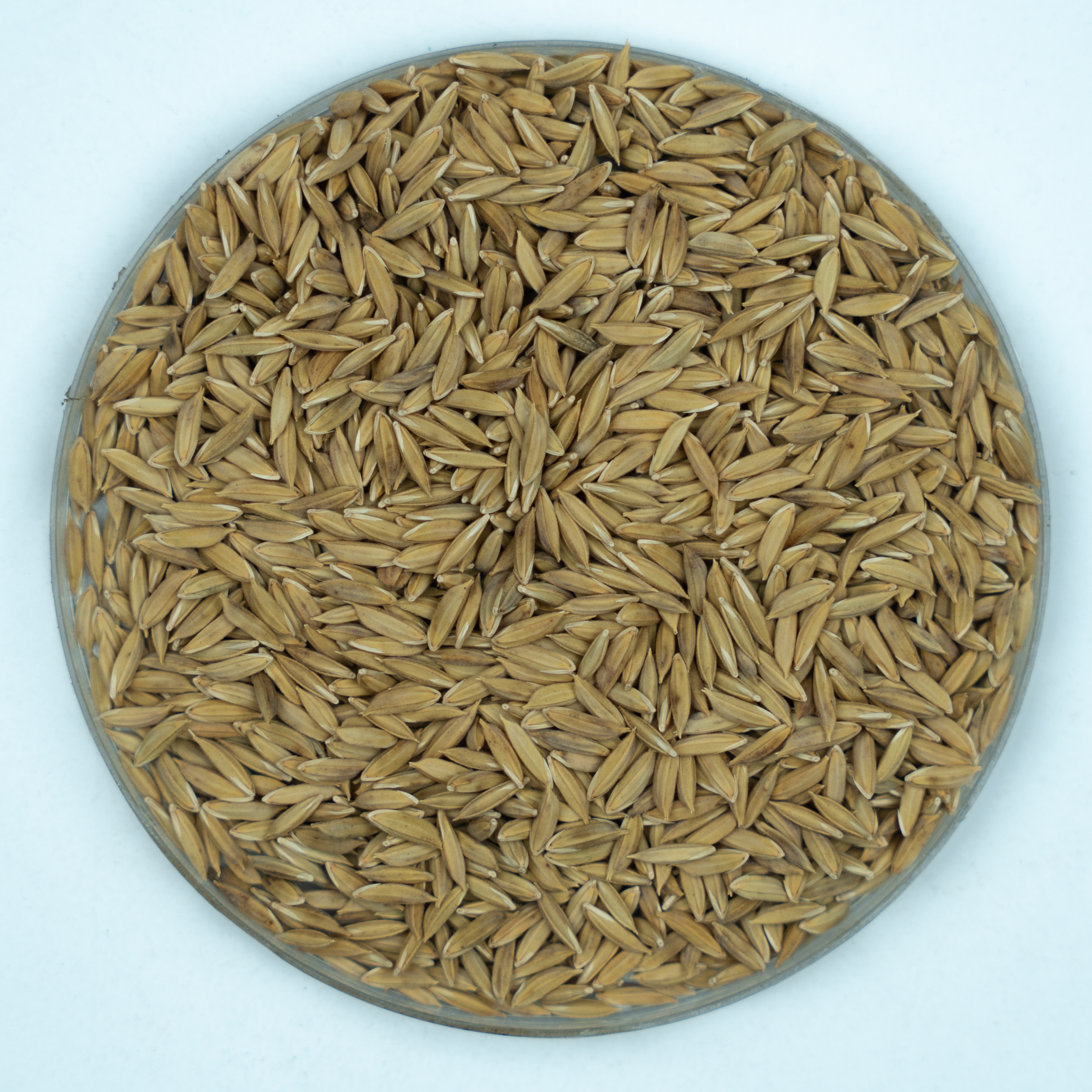
Kataribhog rice

Kataribhog is a fragrant rice in Bangladesh. It is mainly found in Dinajpur area. Kataribhog of Dinajpur is a Geographical Indication(GI) product of Bangladesh.

== Quality ==
This rice looks slender and long. Its tip is a little sharp and curved like a knife. This is not the case in all areas of Bangladesh. Even in Dinajpur, this special variety of paddy is cultivated only in Fashilahat, Choto Baul, Bara Baul, Karimulapur, Khanpur of Dinajpur Sadar Upazila, Kaugaon, Bistopur, Talpukur Mukundapur, Durgadanga, Viail, Paschim Baul and Kaharole upazilas of Chirirbandar Upazila. High sandy-loamy soils are suitable for Kataribhog cultivation.

== Historical legend ==
It is said that Mughal emperor Aurangzeb once summoned King Prannath of Dinajpur to his court on charges of corruption. Prannath took precious stones and Kataribhog rice gifts to the emperor. The emperor was more pleased to receive the Kataribhog rice than the gift of jewels and was pleased to give Prannath the title of 'Maharaja'.

== Uses ==
The Flattened rice made from Kataribhog rice is well-known. pilaf, biryani, zarda, kheer, phirni, etc., can be prepared with this rice. This rice is fragrant and delicious.

== See also ==
- Rice production in Bangladesh
- Tulshimala rice
- List of geographical indications in Bangladesh
