= List of rice cultivars =

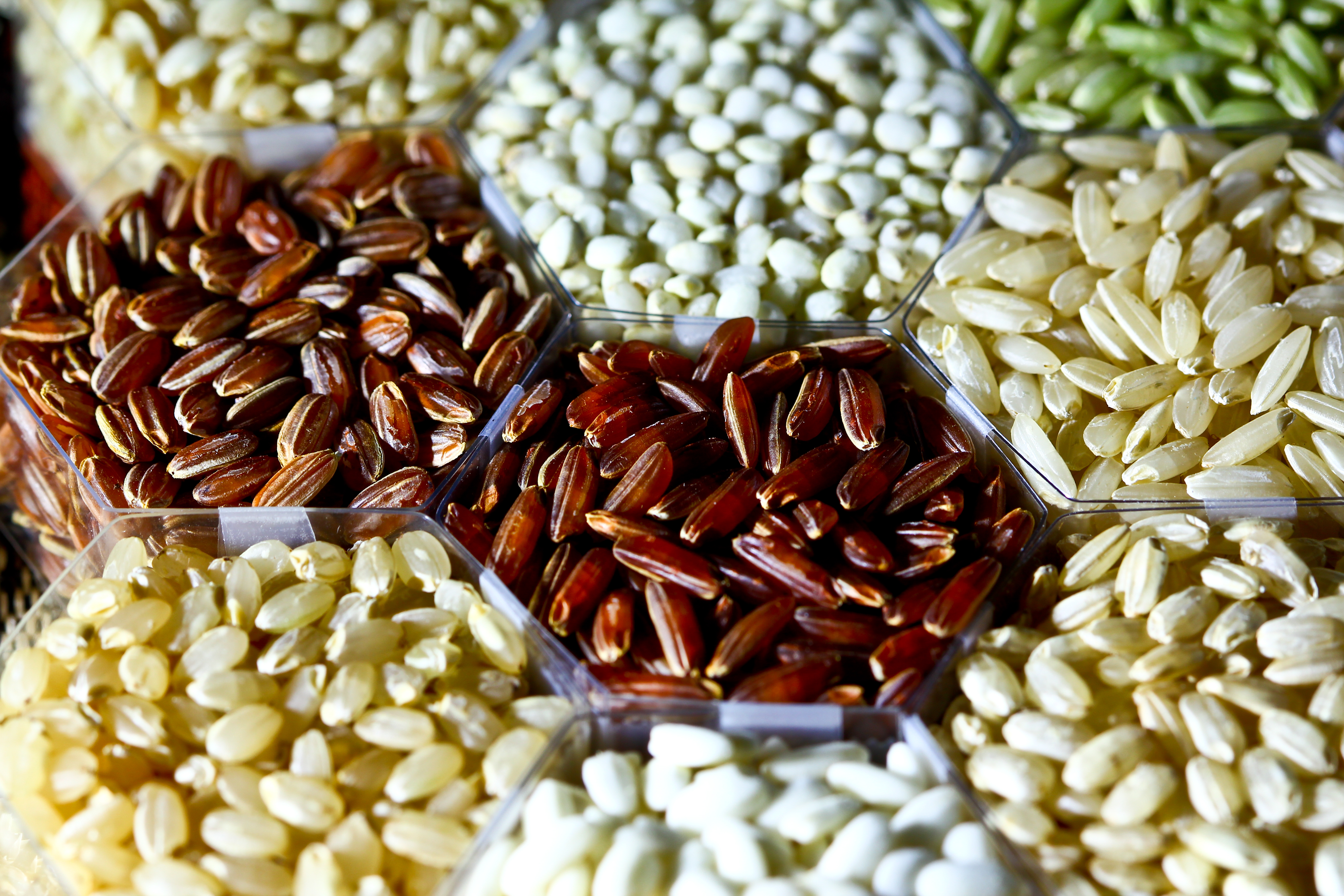
Rice can come in many shapes, colours and sizes.

This is a list of rice cultivars, also known as rice varieties. There are several species of grain called rice. Asian rice (Oryza sativa) is most widely known and most widely grown, with two major subspecies (indica and japonica) and over 40,000 varieties. Also included in this list are varieties of African rice (Oryza glaberrima) and wild rice (genus Zizania).

Rice may vary in genetics, grain length, color, thickness, stickiness, aroma, growing method, and other characteristics, leading to many cultivars. For instance, over nine major rice cultivars exist to make sake alone. The two subspecies of Asian rice, indica and japonica, can generally be distinguished by length and stickiness. Indica rice is long-grained and unsticky, while japonica is short-grained and glutinous.

Rice can also be divided based on processing type into the two broad categories of brown and white. Brown rice is whole grain, with only the inedible hull of the seed removed, while white rice additionally has the bran and germ removed through the process of milling. Milled rice may not necessarily actually be white in color; there are purple, black, and red variants of rice, which can be eaten whole grain or milled.

The cultivars listed in this article may vary in any number of these characteristics, and most can be eaten whole grain or milled (brown or white). However, there are often strong cultural preferences for one or the other, depending on variety and region.

== North American varieties ==
- Texas rice
- Texmati
- Brazos
- Gulfrose
- Madison
- Pecos
- Rico
- Wild rice (Zizania aquatica)

=== California varieties ===
- California New Variety rice
- Calhikari-201
- Calmati-201
- Calmochi rice
- Caloro
- Calrose rice
- Calusa
- Nishiki rice
- Wehani rice

=== Canadian varieties ===
- Northern Wild rice (also known as Canadian Wild rice (Zizania palustris))

=== Carolina varieties ===
- Carolina Gold
- Charleston Gold

=== Texas varieties ===
- Texas rice
- Texas wild rice (Zizania texana)

=== Louisiana varieties ===
- Blue Rose
- Earl
- Mercury
- Nato
- Pecan rice
- Popcorn rice
- Vista

== African varieties ==
- Abakaliki rice
  - Grown in the states of Abakaliki and Ebonyi in eastern Nigeria
  - Cultivated thrice a year
  - Sweet and easy to cook
- African rice
- Ekpoma rice
- New Rice for Africa
- Ofada rice
  - Grown in Ofada, Nigeria
  - Aromatic

== Australian varieties ==
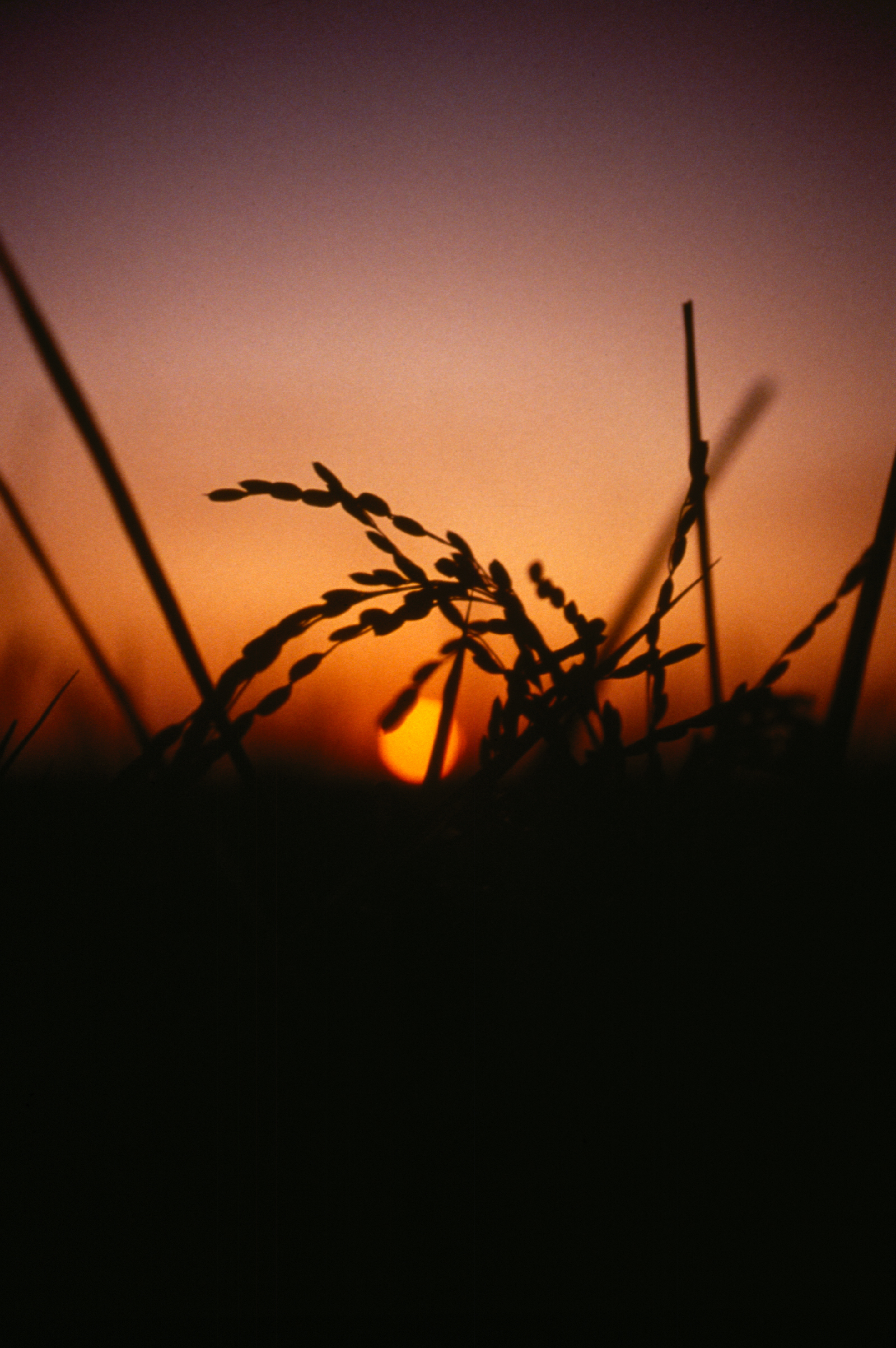
Rice being grown in Australia

- Doongara
  - semi-dwarf long grain, hard cooking (high amylose)
- Illabong
  - semi-dwarf arborio style
- Koshihikari
  - tall short grain Japonica style
- Kyeema
  - tall long grain, fragrant
- Langi
  - semi-dwarf long grain, soft jade cooking (low amylose)
- Opus
  - semi-dwarf short grain Japonica style
- Reiziq
  - semi-dwarf medium grain
- Sherpa
  - semi-dwarf medium grain
- Topaz
  - semi-dwarf fragrant long grain

== Bangladeshi varieties ==
- Akia Beruin pattyyy theddi rice
- Akia Beruin White
- Balam Dhan – a group of local Aman rice varieties
- Balam-small Red
- Balam-small White
- Bashmoti Rice
- BINA Dhan – a group of high-yielding rice varieties developed by Bangladesh Institute of Nuclear Agriculture
- Binni Rice
- BRRI Dhan – a group of high-yielding rice varieties developed by Bangladesh Rice Research Institute
- Chinigura Rice
- Digha Dhan – a group of deepwater Aman rice varieties
- Gadai Lashkari
- Hail Girvi
- Hamim
- Hori Dhan
- Kalijira Rice
- Tolsi Mala Dhan – aromatic rice, best from the Sherpur district region.
- Kalo Beruin
- Katari Bhog
- Kathali Beruin Red
- Kathali Beruin White
- Khara Beruin
- Khato Dosh
- Lapha
- Lathial-7 Red
- Lathial-7 White
- Loha Sura
- Matichak
- Minicate Rice
- Modhu Beruin Red
- Modhu Beruin White
- Mou Beruin
- Moulata
- Najir Shail
- Pajam
- Pakh Beruin
- Raujan-1
- Raujan-2
- Sakhorkhana
- Shail Dhan – a group of exotic Aman rice varieties
- Tepu Dhan
- Thakur Bhog
- Diga Dhan
- Depos Dhan

== Bhutanese varieties ==
A single grain of Bhutanese red rice

- Bhutanese red rice

== Burmese varieties ==
- Midon (မြီးတုံး)
- Paw hsan hmwe
- Emahta (ဧည့်မထ)
- Letyezin
- Ngasein (ငစိန်)
- Byat (ဗြတ်)
- Black glutinous rice
- White glutinous rice

== Cambodian varieties ==
- Bonla Pdao (បន្លាផ្ដៅ)
- Cammalis – extra long jasmine rice
- Long Rice
- Neang Khon (នាងខុន)
- Neang Minh (នាងមិញ) – long grain rice
- Phka Khnhei (ផ្កាខ្ញី) – fragrant variety, phka meaning "flower"
- Phkar Malis (ផ្កាម្លិះ) – Cambodia Jasmine Rice
- Senchey Brand (សែនជ័យ ប្រេន) is a low glycemic index rice (GI=55), medium grain, photosensitive period, traditional seeds
- Senkraob (សែនក្រអូប)
  - Won the National Best Rice Award in 2017 have been certified as Medium Glycemic Index (GI) of 62 based on rigorous testing performed by Temasek Polytechnic Glycemic Index Research Unit (GIRU)
- Phka Romdul (ផ្ការំដូល)
- Red Rice (ស្រូវក្រហម)
- White rice (ស្រូវសោ)
- Sen Pi Dao (សែនពិដោ)
- Riang cheay (រាំងជ័យ)
- Srauv Pong Rolork (ស្រូវ ពងរលក)
- Srauv Ha Mort (ស្រូវ ហាមាត់)
- Srauv IR (រស្រូវអីអ៊ែរ)

== Chinese varieties ==
- Black Asian
- Manchurian Wild rice (Zizania latifolia)
- Oryza rufipogon
- Ponlai
- Wuchang

== Dominican varieties ==
- Cristal 100
- Idiaf 1
- Inglés Corto
- Inglés Largo
- Juma 57
- Juma 58
- Juma 66
- Juma 67
- Prosequisa 4
- Prosequisa 5
- Prosequisa 10
- Toño Brea
- Yocahú CFX-18

== French varieties ==
- Camargue red rice

== Greek varieties ==
- Blue Rose
- Carolina
- Glassé
- Nychaki
- Parboiled

== Indian varieties ==
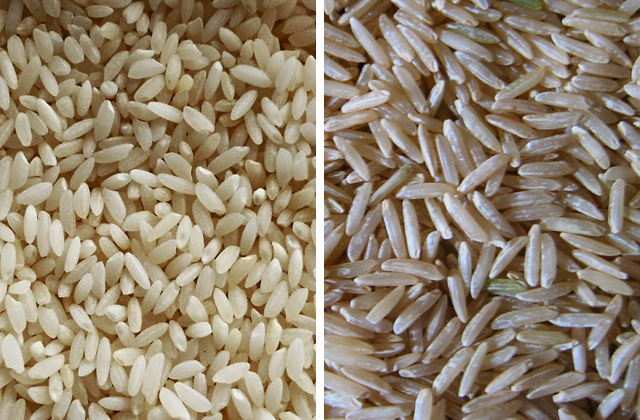
Two cultivars of rice from India compared: khyma (left) and basmati (right)

Until 1970, India had about 110,000 varieties of rice and now it has about 6,000 varieties.

- Aizon Rice
- Ambemohar
- Annapoornna
- Atop
- Basmati rice
- Barma Black rice
- Bhut Muri
- Bora rice
- Champa rice
- Chokuwa rice
- Clearfield Rice
- Dubraj rice
- Gandhasala
- Gobindobhog
- Hansraj
- Hasan Serai
- HMT Rice
- Idly Rice – short grain
- Jay Shrirama Rice
- Joha rice
- Jyothi
- Kamini Rice
- Kasalath
- Katta Sambar
- Laxmi Bhog (West Bengal)
- Minicate
- Molakolukulu
- Navara Rice
- Patna rice
- Ponni Rice
- Poreiton Chakhau – an aromatic dark red rice from Manipur
- Pusa Basmati 1121
- Pusa Rice
- Radhunipagal rice
- Raja Hansa Rice
- Ranjit Rice
- Rosematta Rice
- Sona Masuri
- Surekha
- Thimmasamundaram Mollakolukulu
- Tulaipanji (West Bengal)

=== Rice varieties of Maharastra ===
- Kasbai
- Indrayani
- Kolum
- Ambemohar
- Gobindobhog
- Ponni
- Ambika

=== Rice varieties of Punjab and Haryana ===
Basmati and premium non-basmati rice grows in Punjab and Haryana region of India, such as:

- Traditional Basmati Rice
- Basmati 30,31
- PUSA Basmati Rice
- 1121 Basmati Rice
- 1509 Basmati Rice
- 1718 Basmati Rice
- Sugandha Rice
- Sharbati Rice
- RH-10 Rice
- Parmal 11 or PR11 Rice
- Parmal 14 or PR14 Rice
- Parmal 47 or PR 47 Rice
- Parmal 106 or PR 106 Rice

=== Rice varieties of Andhra Pradesh ===
Andhra Pradesh are home to hundreds of rice varieties, such as:

- Chitti Mutyalu
- Sona masoori or Bangaru Theegalu
- Pusa-677 (IET-12617)
- Krishna Hamsa
- Triguna (IET-12875)
- Keshava
- Swathi
- Vedagiri
- Maruteru Sannalu
- Cottondora Sannalu
- Bharani
- Deepti
- Srikakulam Sannalu
- Vasundhara
- Early Samba
- Surya
- Tholakari
- Godavari
- Shanthi
- Indra
- Sree Kurma
- BPT Rice
- 1010 (Veyyi Padi)
- Aarkalu – an ancient varietal
- Swarna
- Samba
- RJL
- Sampada
- Amara
- Sri Dhruthi
- Tarangini
- Bheema
- Chandra
- Pushyami
- Prabhat
- Sujatha
- Maruteru Samba
- Maruteru Mahsuri
- Sravani
- Samba masuri
- Gidda masuri
- Vijaya masuri
- Tella Masuri
- Jeelakara Masuri
- Molagolukulu
- Jeelakara Sannalu
- Jayelu

=== Rice varieties of Karnataka ===
- Farmer Developed Varieties
  - Mysore Mallige
  - NMS2
  - Chinnaponni
  - HMT
  - De Govinda
- Medicinal Rice
  - Navara (originally from Kerala)
  - Diabetic Rice
  - Karigajavali
  - Kagisale
  - Doddabairnellu
- Scented Aromatic Rice
  - Gandhsale
  - Jeerige Sanna
  - Sannakki
  - Ambemore
  - Burma Black
- Daily Rice
  - Salem Sanna
  - Rajbhoga
  - Gowri Sanna
  - Rajkamal
  - Karijaddu
  - Karidaddibudda
  - Jolaga
  - Munduga
  - Doddabarinellu
- Rice specific to Karnataka
  - Rajamudi
  - Rathnachudi
  - Sannavalya
  - Mysore Sanna
  - Bangaragundu
- BR-2655
- IR-30864
- Jaya
- Kagga of Manikatta
- Thanu
- Tunga

=== Rice varieties of Odisha ===
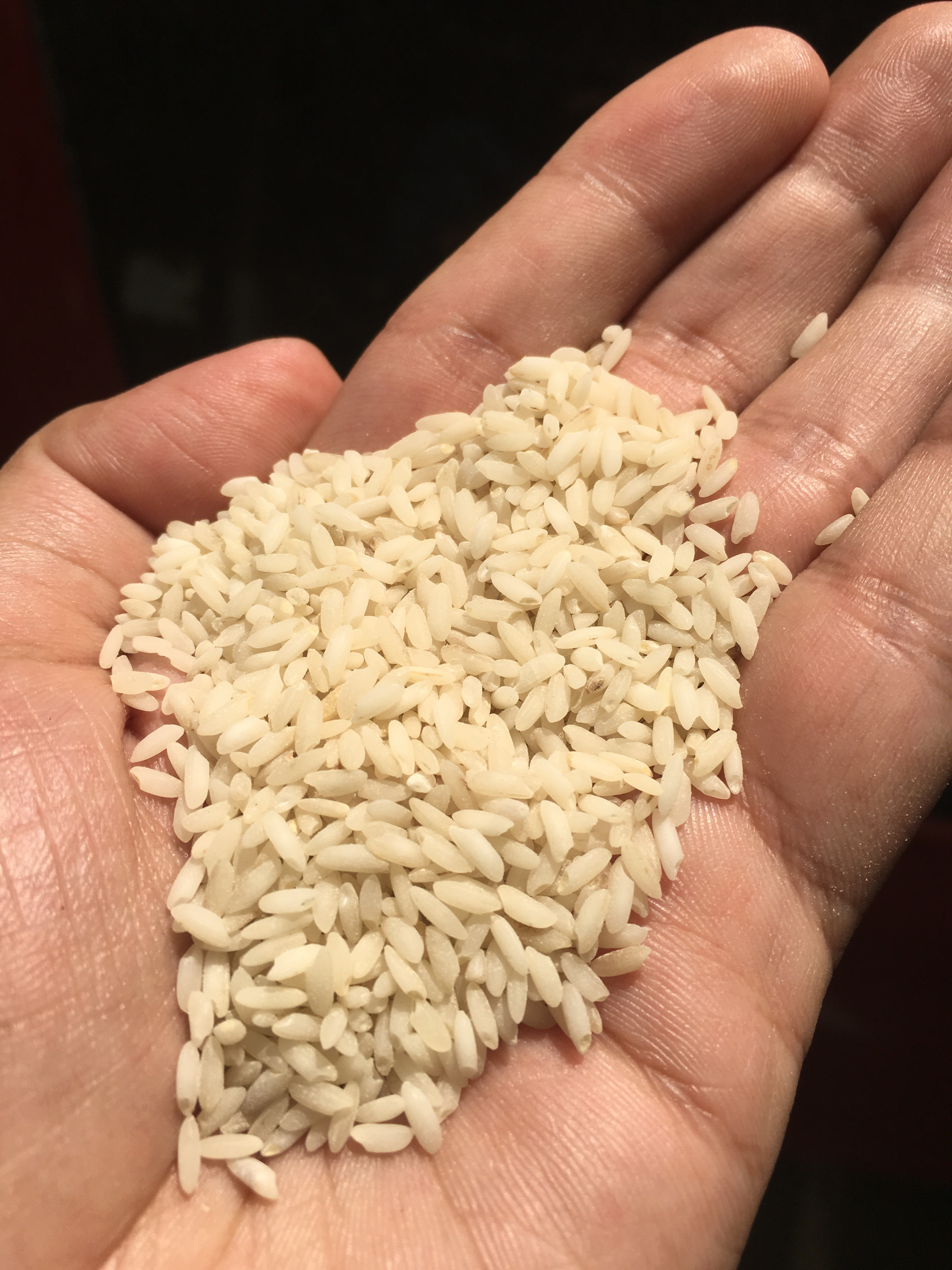
De-husked and milled Kalanamak rice in India

- Nalihati (non-aromatic)
- Padmakeshari (aromatic)
- Kalamoti (aromatic)
- Balami (aromatic)
- Kalajiri (aromatic)
- Tulasibasa (aromatic)
- Pimpudibasa (aromatic)
- Swarna (non-aromatic)
- Nalabainsi (non-aromatic)
- Pateni (non-aromatic)
- Ratna (IET-1411)

=== Rice varieties of Bihar ===
- Katarni rice
- patna rice
- Badshah bhog
- Rajendra Sweta
- Manjari
- Tulsi

=== Rice varieties of Kerala ===
- Arikirai 110
- Aryan (ആര്യൻ)
- Boli Ari
- Cheera Thouvan
- Chembaavu (ചെമ്പാവ്)
- Chenjeera
- Chennellu
- Cherumadan
- Chitteni (ചിറ്റേനി)
- Chuvanna Choman
- D1 (Uma)
- Dhebi
- Gandhakasala
- Ezhome Rice
- Jeerakasala
- Kaattaazhi (കാറ്റാഴി)
- Kariyadukkan
- Karutharikannan
- Keeripallan
- Kochathikkalaari (കൊച്ചതിക്കലാരി)
- Kodukayama
- Kozhivalan
- Kumaro-athikkalaari (കുമരൊ അതിക്കലാരി)
- Kunjinellu
- Kunjuvithu
- Kuppakayama
- Kuttadan (കുറ്റാടൻ)
- Malakkannan
- Malakkaran
- Matta Palakkad (പാലക്കാടന്‍ മട്ട)
- Modan
- Moorkhan
- Mundakan (മുണ്ടകൻ)
- Mundodan
- Mundot
- Munnayan
- Nallachennellu
- Njavara
- Odachan
- Oryssa
- Palliyaran
- Paravalappan
- Ponnariyan
- Pokkali Rice
- Punjakayama
- Rajadhani
- Rajakayama
- Ratha Choodi
- Sughikayama
- Thavalakkannan (തവളക്കണ്ണൻ)
- Thonnuran
- Thottam
- Thovvan
- Undakayama
- Vachan
- Vattan (വട്ടൻ)
- Vayalthoova (വയൽത്തൂവ)
- Vellachoman
- Vellariyan
- Vellathovvan
- Velutharikannan
- Wayanad Kayamma (കയമ്മ)
- Sali
- Suwagmoni

=== Rice varieties of Tamil Nadu ===
- Aduthurai
- Akshayadhan
- Ambasamudharam
- Amsipiti Dhan
- Aravan Kuruva
- Ariyan Nel
- Arubatham Samba
- Aruvadhan Kodai
- Arwa
- Basmati Tukda
- Bhatta Dhan
- Biagunda Dhan
- Bod Dhan
- Chengalpattu Sirumani
- Chennel
- Chithiraikar (Pondy)
- Chithiraikkar
- Chomala
- Chot Dhan
- Cochin Samba
- Coimbatore
- Eravapandi
- Gandakesala
- Improved Samba Mahsuri
- Improved White Ponni
- IR-20
- Molakolukulu
- IR-50
- Molakolukulu
- Jil Jil Vaigunda
- Jirkudai
- Jogarnath Dhan
- Kadaikazhuthan
- Kaividhai Samba
- Kalarpaalai
- Kalarpalai
- Kalinga III
- Kaliyan Samba
- Kallimadaiyan
- Kallundai
- Kallurundaiyan
- Kamban Samba
- Kandasel/Kandasali
- Kappakkar
- Kappa Samba
- Kar Samba
- Karthigai Samba
- Karunguruvai
- Karuppu Nel
- Karuthakkar
- Katarni
- Kattanur Nel
- Katta Samba
- Kattukuthalam
- Kattu Samba
- Kattu Vaniyam
- Kitchili Samba
- Kollan Samba
- Kollikkar
- Konakkuruvai
- Koomvalai
- Kouni Nel
- Kudaivazhai
- Kudavazhai
- Kudhiraival Samba
- Kullakaar
- Kundri Manisamba
- Kunthali
- Kurangu Samba
- Kuruvai
- Kuruvai Kalanchiyam
- Kuruvaikalayan
- Kuzhiyadichan
- Kullakkara Samba
- Lakshmi Kajal
- Lendhi Dhan
- Mahate
- Mal-bhog
- Manakathai
- Mansoori
- Mappillai Samba
- Maranel
- Mathimuni
- Mattai 110
- Mattaikkar
- Mattaikkuruvai
- Moongil
- Mottakur
- Murugangar Nel
- Muttakkar
- Nalla Manisamba
- Navara
- Neelasamba
- Ninni Dhan
- Norungan
- Njavara
- Oazhava Katrazhai
- Ondrarai Samba
- Oldisaur Dhan
- Ottadai
- Parwmal
- Pathrakali
- Pattaraikkar
- Pattar Pisin
- Periyavari
- Perungar
- Pisini
- Pitchavari
- Ponni Rice
- Poongar
- Poovan Samba
- Puzhuthiikar
- Puzhuthikal
- Puzhuthi Samba
- Rasagadam
- Rongalachi Dhan
- Sadakar
- Sivan Samba
- Siraga samba
- Samba
- Samba Mosanam
- Sandikar
- Sanna Samba
- Seela Rice
- Seeraga Samba
- Selam Samba
- Sembilipanni
- Sempalai
- Sempalai (D.K.M.)
- Sigappu Jermany
- Sigappu Kuzhiyadichan
- Sivappu Chithiraikar
- Sivappu Kuruvikar
- Soolaikuruvai
- Sooran Kuruvai
- Sornavali
- Sornavari
- Sureka
- Surti Kolam/Kolam
- Thangam Samba
- Thidakkal
- Thinni
- Thooyamallee
- Trichy 3
- Tulsi-manjari Black
- Vadan Samba
- Vaigunda
- Valla Arakkan
- Vangu Vellai
- Varadhan
- Varalan
- Varappu Kudainchan
- Vasaramundan
- Veer Adangan
- Veethivadangan (ASD-3)
- Velchi
- Veliyan
- Vellai Chithiraikkar
- Vellaikkariyan
- Vellaikkuruvai
- Vellaikkuruvai
- Vellai Nel
- Vellai Poonkar

=== Rice varieties of Telangana ===
- Indur Samba
- Bathukamma
- RNR 15048 or Telangana Sona or Karnataka Sona
- Improved Samba Mahsuri

=== West Bengal rice varieties ===
There are possibly up to 82,700 varieties of rice extant in India, and of those more than 5000 were found in West Bengal. However, only 150 of them are commonly grown. Many are grown organically to compete with more modern cultivars. The Agricultural Training Centre of West Bengal exists to conserve and promote the use of folk rice varieties, including many listed below.

- Alai
- Amkel
- Antarbhet
- Are emo
- Adansilpa
- Agarali
- Agniban
- Aguripak
- Anshphal
- Arabaihar
- Arabaihar
- Are hat Punko
- Aroar
- Asanliya
- Bahurupi
- Begun bichi
- Bhaaluki
- Bhaludubraj
- Bhasa Kalmi
- Bhasa manik
- Birpana
- Badamphul
- Badshabhog
- Bahdurbhog
- Baigan monjia
- Bakui
- Balam
- Balaramsal
- Banglaptanai
- Baranali
- Barshalakshmi
- Baskathi
- Basmoti-370
- Baspata
- Bhimsal
- Bhogdhan
- Bhutia
- Birahi
- Birai
- Bodimani
- Chamarmani
- Chamatkar
- Chinakamini
- Chandrakanata
- Deko 2
- Denta
- Dheku
- Dhundhuni
- Dudheswar
- Dudheswar Sundarban
- Danaguri
- Dandkhani
- Dandsal
- Danti
- Dayalmadina
- Debsundari
- Dehradun Gandheswari
- Desi Jarhan Baihar
- Desidhan
- Dhapa
- Dharaial
- Dhusari
- Dolle Kartick
- Dope
- Dubraj
- Dudheswar
- Dudhkalma
- Dwarkasal
- Fulmugri
- Gangabaru
- Garikhajara
- Geligeti
- Ghios
- Ghurghupaijam
- Gitanjali
- Gobindabhog
- Gopalbhog
- Goradhan
- Janglijata
- Haldichuri
- Haludgati
- Hamai
- Hamilton
- Harinkajli
- Hatidhan
- Hendebaihar
- Heruajoha
- HJP 110
- HJP 72
- HJP 73
- HJP 77
- HJP sahebbhog
- HMT
- Hogla
- HP 203
- Hamiltan
- Hangara
- Hormanona
- Itanagar
- Jawaful
- jeeraful
- Jalkamini
- Jamainaru
- Jasmine
- Jata
- Jhili
- Jhinge sal
- Jhingesal L
- Jhuli
- Jhulur
- Jhumpuri
- Jigiresamba
- Jugal
- Jabra
- Jaldhapa
- Jaldubi
- JP 57
- Jubri dhan
- Kaleti
- Kaloboro
- Kumragore
- Kabirajsal
- Kabirajsal Odisha
- Kaggavat
- Khara
- Kahndagiri
- Kaika
- Kalachipta
- Kalalahi
- Kalamdani
- Kalodhan
- Kalodhapa
- Kalogoda
- Kalojira
- Kalonunia
- Kaltura
- Kalavat
- Kaminibhog
- Kamolsankari
- Kanakchur
- Kanchafulo
- Kankri
- Karigavole
- Karikagga
- Karni
- Kasiphul
- Kasuabinni
- Katarangi
- Kataribhog
- Katki
- Kendu Manjia
- Kerala Sundar
- Kesab sal
- Khadwak
- Kolajoha
- Kolkiala pateni
- Komol
- Krishanabhog
- Kuji Pateni
- Kute Patnai
- Laghu
- Lakhsman sal
- Lalbadshabhog
- Lalbasmati
- Laldhan Patela
- Laldhapa
- Lalgetu
- Lalkalam
- Lalsita
- Lathisal
- Lusri
- Lalbahal
- Laldhan
- Lalsaru
- Lalu
- Langlamuthi
- Lohoindi
- Maiganguri
- Malabati
- Maliagiri
- Marikhas
- Meghi
- Meghnad Dumru
- Mohini 2
- Motabaihar
- Moulo
- Machakanata
- Madhumala
- Malsiara
- Marichsal
- Markali
- Mastaer patnai
- Matidhan
- Matla
- Medi
- Mehadi
- Mohonbhog
- Mugojai
- Nagaland kalo
- Nalipankhia
- Nikkodan
- Nivar
- Nonakshitish
- Nagaland
- Nagalanmd Sada
- Nageswari
- Nagra patnai
- Narayan 21
- Narayan kamini
- Narkelchari
- Naryan Patnai
- Neli emo
- Orasal
- P 64 From Meghalya
- P 66 From Meghalaya
- Pakistani Basmati
- Pakri
- Pankha Gura
- Pari
- Paru
- Pateni
- Patikalam
- Patnai 23
- Payti emo
- Putkhalai
- Parbal
- Parimolsana
- Phakirmoni
- Pokali
- Rabansal
- Radhatilak
- Radhuni pagal
- Raghu sal
- Ramchandrabhog
- Ramigelli
- Rangi Dhan
- Rani akanda
- Radha emo
- Rahspanjar
- Ramjiara
- Ranikajal
- Rupali
- Rupsal
- Sadagetu
- Sabita
- Sabraj
- Sada Chenga
- Sada Kalam
- Safari
- Salkele
- Samba sole
- Sapuri
- Sararaj
- Sarukala
- Shatia
- Shu Kalma
- Silkote
- Sita sal
- Sitabhog
- Siulee
- Sole
- Soler Pona
- Sonalu
- Sonasari
- Srikamal
- Sundari
- Super sita
- Talmugur
- Tangar sal
- Teranga
- Thubi
- Tilakkachari
- Tulsa
- Tulsibas
- Tulsimanjari
- Tulsmukul
- Tilakasturi
- Toragoda
- Tulaipanji
- Vogalaya
- White Harisnakar
- White ponny

== Indonesian rice varieties/landraces ==
In Indonesia, there are at least 45 varieties of rice for wet-field production (sawah) and 150 varieties of rice for dry-field production.

- Anak Daro
- Andel Jaran
- Angkong
- Batang Lembang
- Batang Ombilin
- Batang Piaman
- Bengawan
- Cempo
- Ceredek
- Ceredek asal Gaduang Surian
- Ceredek asal Talang Babungo
- Ceredek Merah
- Ceredek Putih asal Tanjung Balik
- Cianjur Pandanwangi (aromatic)
- Cisokan
- Dharma Ayu
- Dryland rice landraces of Java
- Ekor Kuda
- Engseng
- Gropak (Kulon Progo-Jogja)
- Gundelan (Malang)
- Indramayu: Gropak
- Induk Ayam
- Jambur Urai
- Kebo
- Ketan Lusi
- Ketan Tawon
- Longong
- Markoti
- Melati
- Merong (Pasuruan)
- Ondel
- Padi Boy Rice
- Padi Cere Kuning
- Padi Cere Unggul
- Padi Gadu (unhulled rice seed)
- Padi Gandamana
- Padi Hitam
- Padi Kidangsari
- Padi Konyal
- Padi Kuning
- Padi Kutu
- Padi Mendali
- Padi Mentik
- Padi Mentik Wangi
- Padi Pandan Wangi
- Padi Parak
- Padi Putih
- Padi Sari Wangi
- Padi Sri Wulan
- Padi Suntiang
- Padi Wangi Lokal
- Pemuda Idaman
- Peta
- Rajalele (semi-aromatic)
- Rangka Madu
- Rejung Kuning
- Rijal
- Rojolele
- Sawah Kelai
- Siherang
- Sikadedek
- Simenep
- Sri Kuning
- Srimulih
- Tambun Data
- Temanggung black rice
- Tembaga
- Tjina
- Tumpang Karyo
- Tunjung
- Umbul-umbul
- Untup
- Wulu

== Iranian varieties ==
Many varieties of rice are cultivated in Iran. A few of them are listed below.

- Ambarboo
- Binam
- Domsiah
- Gerdeh
- Gharib
- Hasan Sarai
- Hasani
- Hashemi
- Kamfiruzi
  - Grown in Fars province along the Kor River
- Lenjan
  - Grown in Isfahan province along the Zayandeh Rud River
- Salari
- Sang Tarom
- Tarom
- Tarom Roushan
- tarom omid

== Italian varieties ==
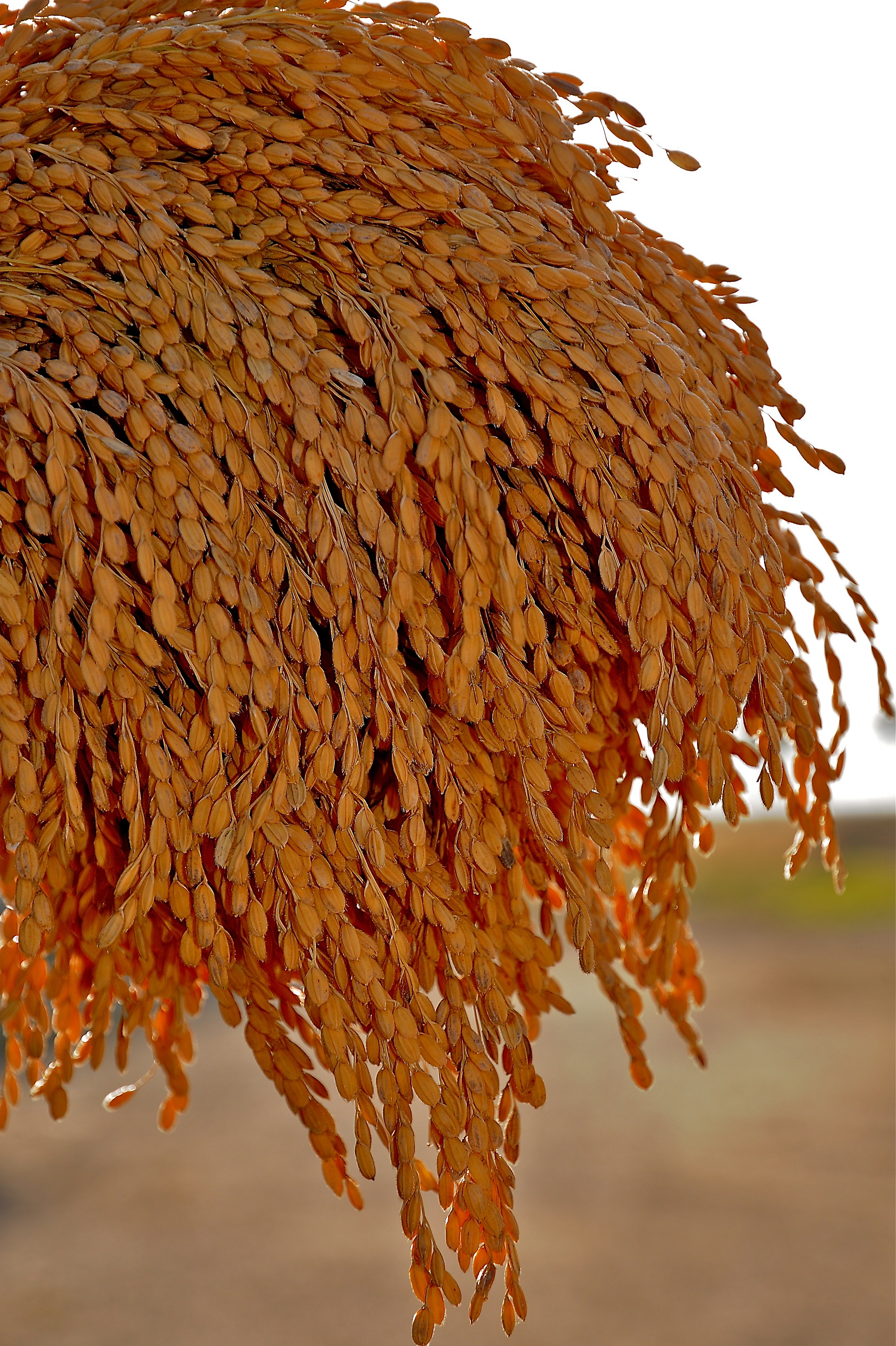
Maratelli rice before harvest in Italy

- Arborio
- Ariete
- Baldo
- Balilla
- Carnaroli
- Gloria
- Lido
- Maratelli Historical Variety
- Originario
- Padano
- Ribe
- Roma
- Sant'Andrea
- Selenio
- Thaibonnet
- Venere – a black aromatic specialty rice
- Vialone Nano

== Japanese varieties ==
- Kitaake

Non-glutinous rice

- Akebono
- Akitakomachi
- Asahi
- Domannaka
- Fusaotome
- Haenuki
- Hanaechizen
- Hinohikari
- Hitomebore
- Hoshinoyume
- Kamachi
- Kinuhikari
- Kirara397
- Koshihikari
- Moeminori
- Nagomi risotto – Higher starch content medium-grain rice
- Nanatsuboshi
- Nipponbare
- Phoosphoos takuba
- Princess Sari – Long-grain rice
- Sainokagayaki
- Sasanishiki
- Tochiginoyume
- Tsuyahime

Varieties used in sake production

- Ginpu
- Gohyakumangoku
- Gouriki
- Iwai
- Kameno'o
- Miyamanishiki
- Omachi
- Sakemusashi
- Wataribune
- Yamada Nishiki
- Yumetoiro – used for making Awamori

Glutinous rice

- Dewanomochi
- Himenomochi
- Hiyokumochi
- Kitayukimochi
- Koganemochi
- Yukiminori

Aromatic Rice

- Haginokaori
- Hieri
- Hyugakaori
- Sawakaori
- Towanishiki

Red Rice

- Akamuro
- Benisarasa
- Soujya Akamai
- Toukon
- Tsushima Akamai

Black rice

- Asamurasaki
- Murasakinomai
- Okunomurasaki
- Shihou

== Malaysian varieties ==
White rice

- Malinja
- Mahsuri
- Ria
- Bahagia
- Murni
- Marsia
- Jaya
- Sri Malaysia 1
- Sri Malaysia 2
- MR 1 (Setanjung)
- MR 7 (Sekencang)
- MR 10 (Sekembang)
- MR 27 (Kadaria)
- MR 52 (Manik)
- MR 71 (Muda)
- MR 77 (Seberang)
- MR 73 (Makmur)
- MR 84
- MR 81
- MR 103
- MR 106
- MR 123
- MR 127
- MR 159
- MR 167
- MR 185
- MR 211
- MR 219
- MR 220
- MR 232
- MR 253
- MR 263
- MR 269
- MRIA
- MR 284
- Putra 1
- Putra 2
- UKMRC-2
- UKMRC-8

Glutinous rice

- Pulut Malaysia 1
- MR 47 (Pulut Siding)

Black glutinous rice

- Pulut Hitam 9

Red rice

- MRM 16

Fragrant rice

- MRQ 50 (Puteri)
- MRQ 74 (Maswangi)
- MRQ 76

Herbicide tolerance rice

- MR 220 CL1
- MR 220 CL2

== Nepali varieties ==
- Basmati
- Kalopatle
- Jumli Marshi
- Pokhareli Jethobudho
- Kachorwa – 4
- Kachorwa – 8
- Tilki
- Tilki – 4
- Tilki – 8
- Tilki – 12
- Kariya Parewapwankh
- Barkhe 1027
- Barkhe 2014
- Anamol Masuli
- Kalo Nuniya
- Shyamjira
- Saathi
- Kalo Jhinuwa
- Kalo Jira
- Ghiupuri
- Sunaulo Sugandha
- Sarju 52
- Radha 4
- Taichung-176
- Khumal (2, 4, 5)
- Ghaiya
- Anadi
- Makawanpur-1

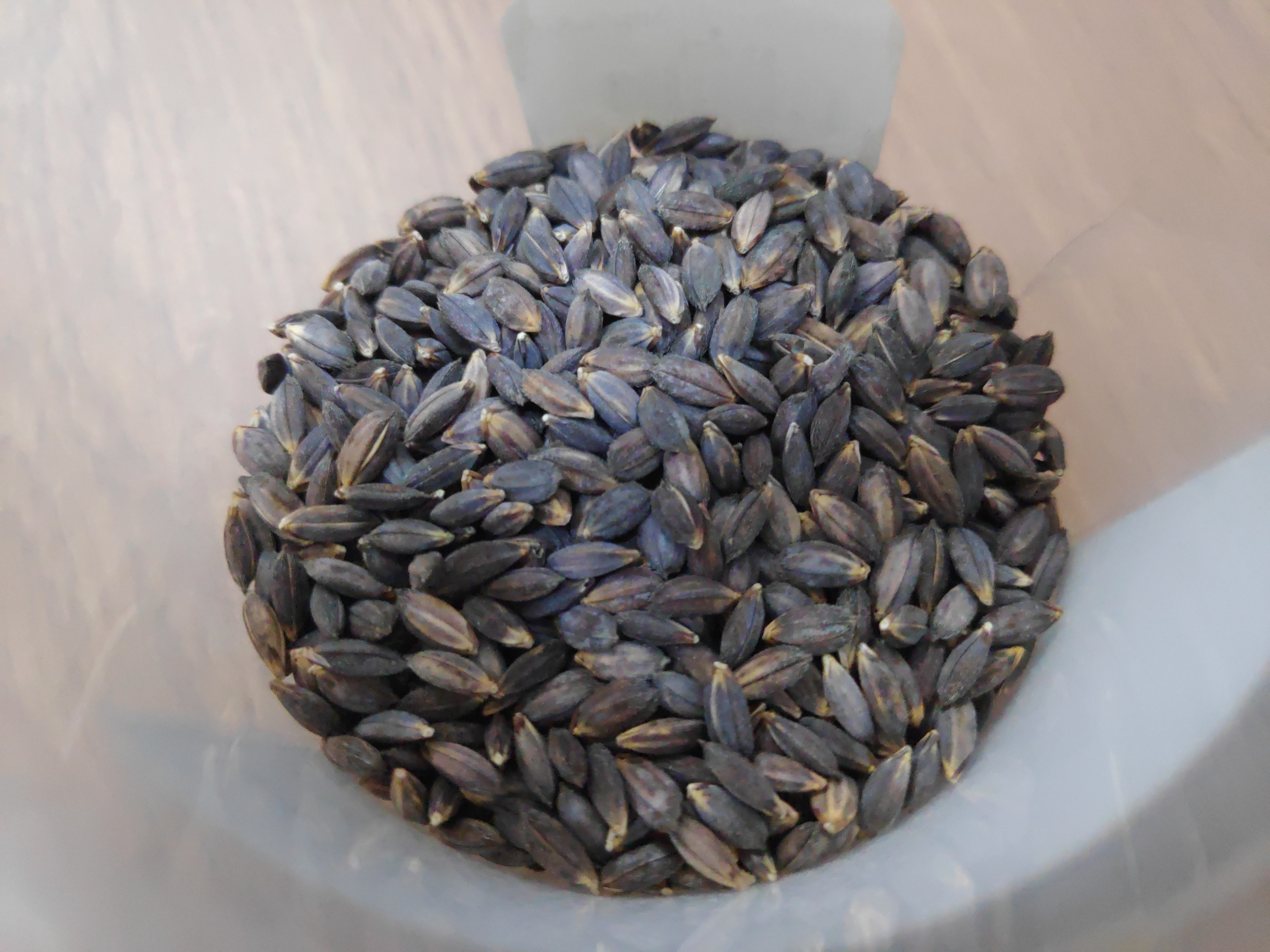
Kalopatle

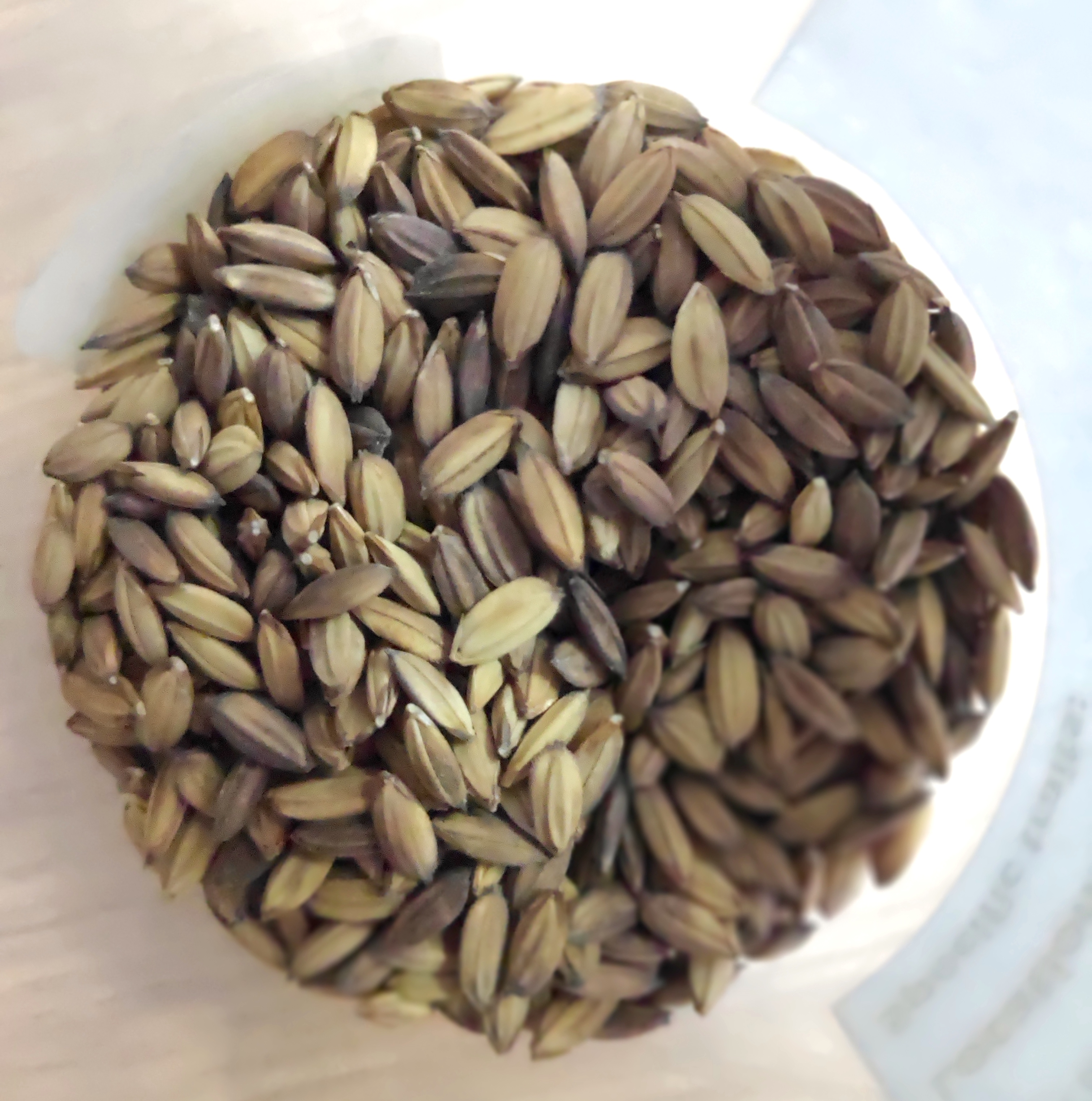
Jumli Marshi

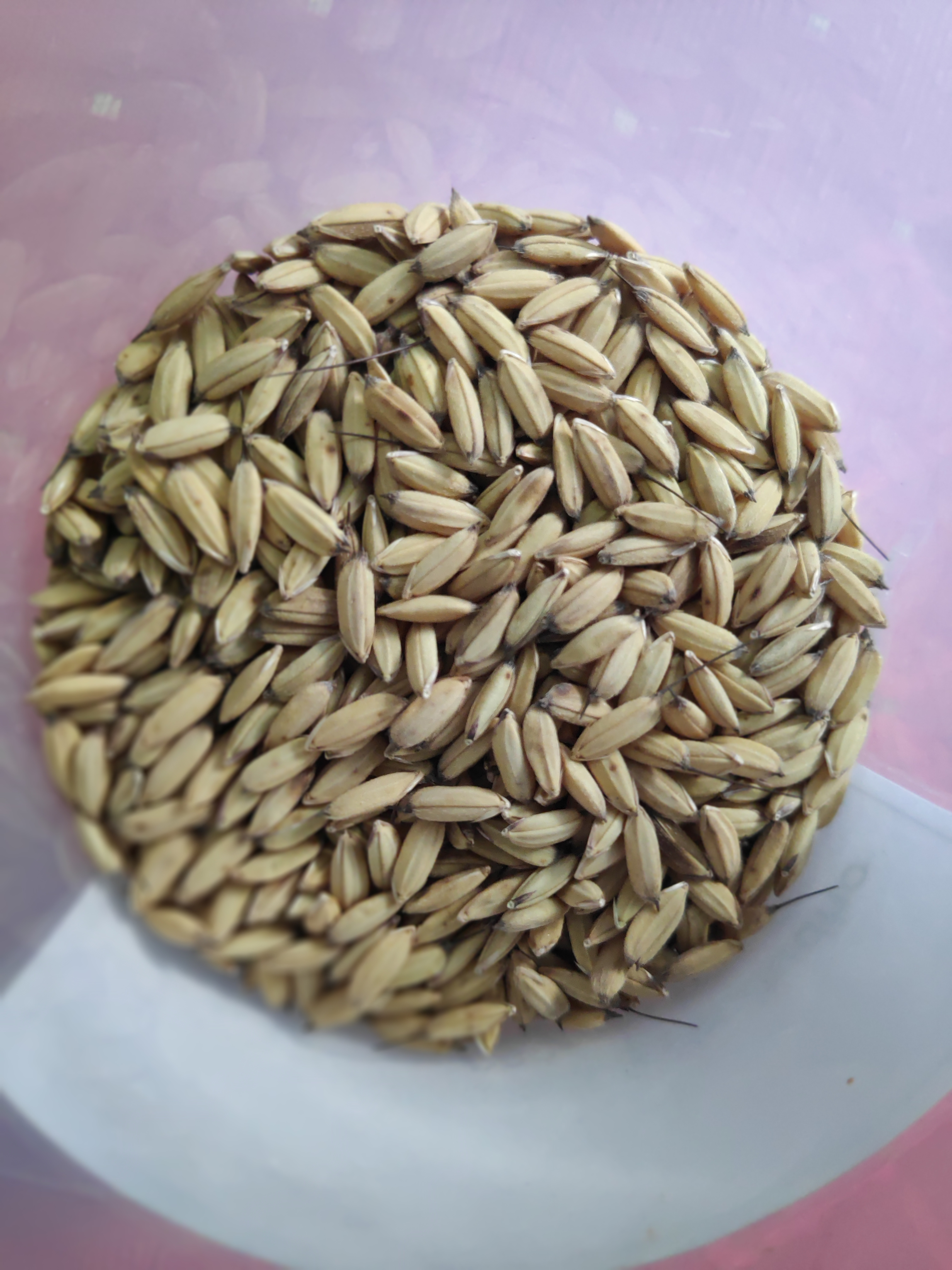
Pokhareli Jethobudho

== Pakistani varieties ==
- Basmati PK-198
- Basmati PK-370
- Basmati PK-385
- Basmati PK-515
- Basmati 2000
- Basmati Pak or Kernal Basmati
- Basmati D-98
- DR 82 Long Grain
- DR 83 Long Grain
- DR 92 Long Grain
- Himsha Basmati 67
- Irri-6 Non Basmati Long Grain Rice
- Irri-9 Non Basmati Long Grain Rice
- C-9 Non basmati Long Grain Rice
- Kainaat (1121)
- Kasha Basmati 167
- Khushbu
- KS 282 Non Basmati Long Grain Rice
- KSK 133
- KSK 434
- Moomal
- PK-386 Long Grain Rice
- PS-2 Non Basmati Extra Long Grain Rice
- PSP-2001
- Basmati SD-D34
- Shadab (R-1, A,1, B-1, B-2)
- Shaheen Basmati
- Shahi Basmati 451
- Super Basmati
- Unique Basmati 15
- Zaiqa HT-1215
- Sada Hayat
- Shahkar
- JP-5
- Kashmir Nafees
- Swat-I
- Swat-II
- Dilrosh-97
- Fakhar-e-Malakand
- Sarshar
- Shahkar
- Basmati Chenab
- Basmati Kissan
- Basmati Punjab
- Basmati 1509
- Noor Basmati

== Philippine varieties ==
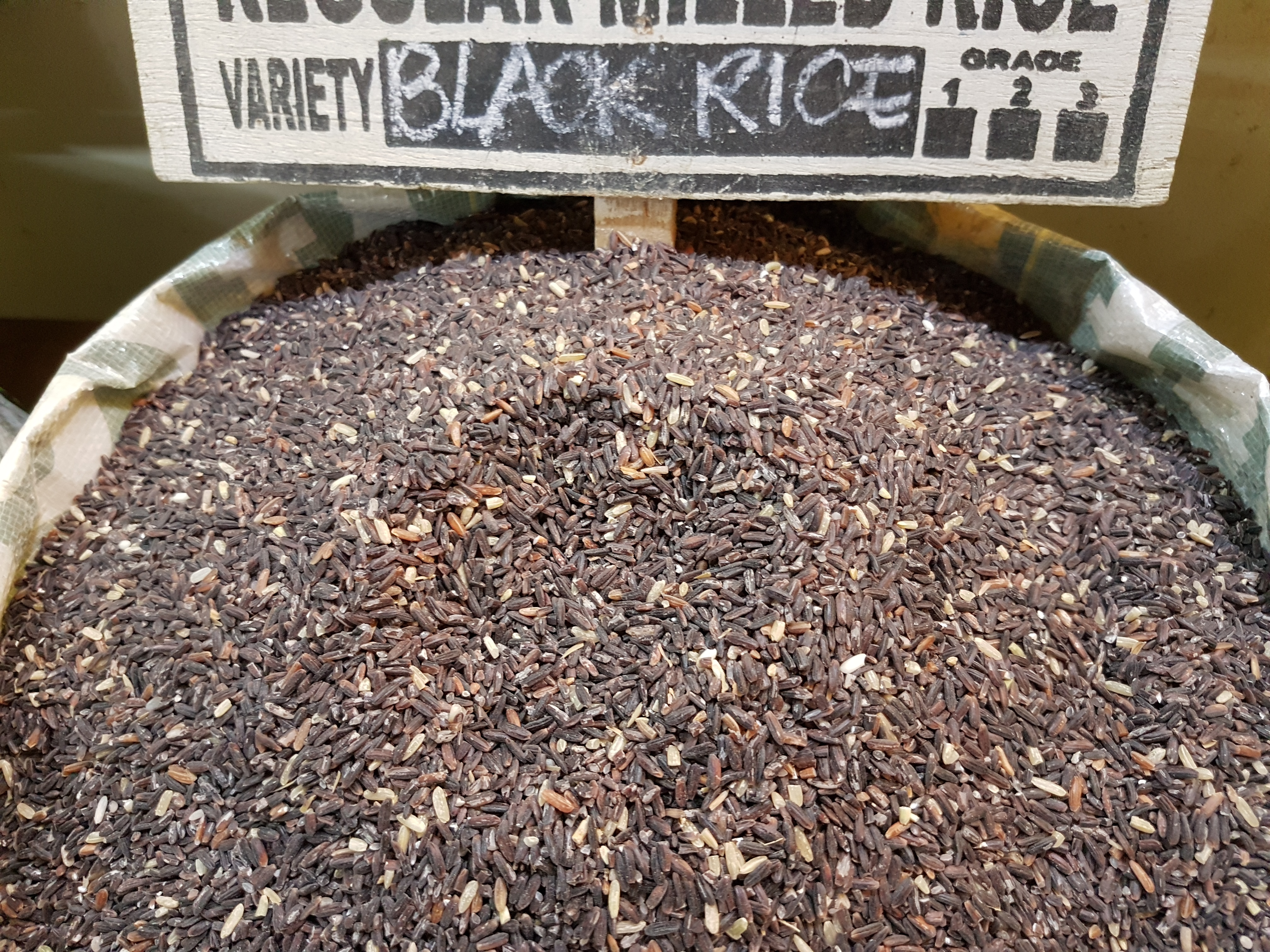
Balatinaw (or Balatinao), an heirloom black rice from Mountain Province, Philippines

- 7 tonner
- Angelika
- Azucena
- Balatinaw
- Baysilanon
- Chong-ak
- Dinorado
- Ifugao Rice
- Imbuucan
- IR-64
- IR-8
- IR-841
- Angelica
- Kalinayan
- Maharlika
- Mestiso
- Milagrosa pino
- Ominio
- Pirurutong (purple glutinous rice)
- R-238
- Sampaguita
- Segadis Milagrosa
- Sinandomeng
- Tapol (white glutinous rice)
- Wagwag
- V-10
- V-160
- White Rose

== Portuguese varieties ==
- Ariete
- Arroz da terra
- Carolino
- Ponta rubra
- Valtejo

== Sri Lankan varieties ==
- Badhabath
- Kaluheenati
- Keeri Samba
- Madathawalu
- Nadu Rice
- Samba
- Sri Lankan Red Rice
- Sri Lankan white rice
- Supiri Nadu
- Supiri Samba
- Suwandhel
- Kurulu Thuda
- Gonabaru
- Dik wee
- Hichchi naga
- Pokkali
- Madathawalu
- Masuran
- Rathkara al
- Rath hada al
- Kalu kumara
- Herath banda
- Maha ma wee
- San sun
- Kiri naran
- Kalu heenati
- Sudu heenati
- Weda heenati
- Goda heenati
- Dik heenati

== Spanish varieties ==
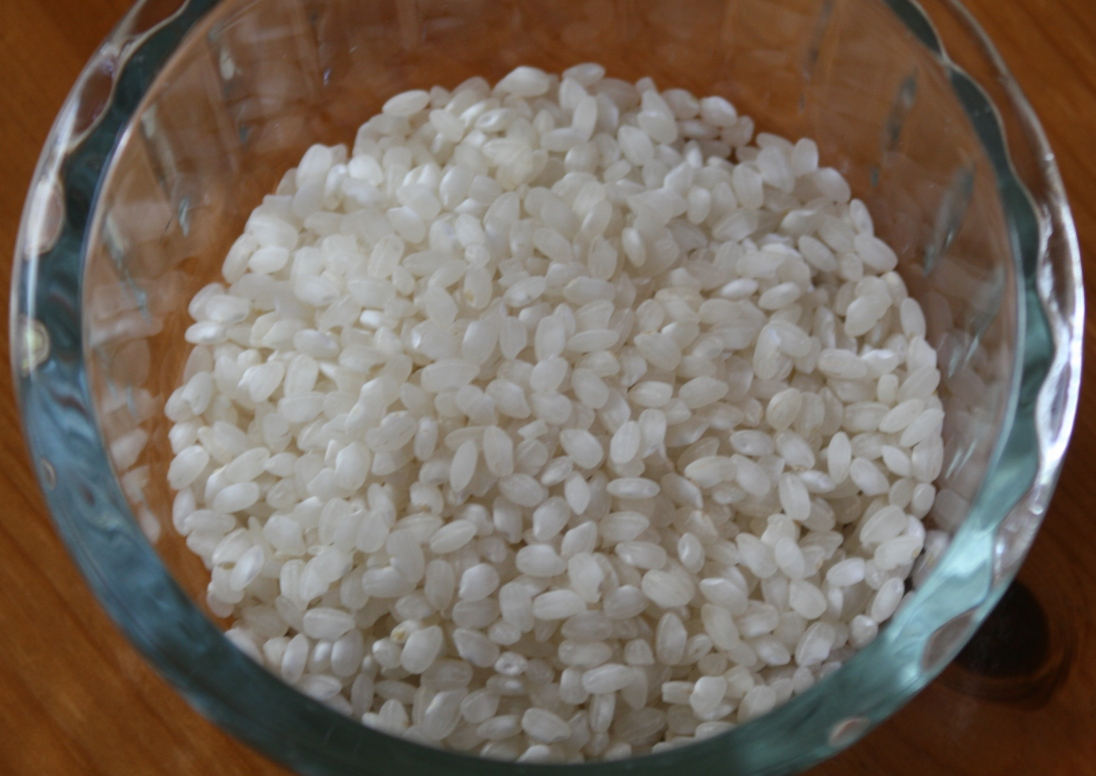
Bomba rice

- Albufera (premium pearly round rice)
- Bahia (pearly round rice)
- Balilla x Sollana (pearly round rice)
- Bomba (premium pearly round rice)
- Calasparra (premium pearly round rice)
- Fonsa (pearly round rice)
- Gleva (pearly round rice)
- Guadiamar (crystalline medium rice)
- J.Sendra (pearly round rice)
- Marisma (pearly round rice)
- Puntal (crystalline long rice)
- Senia (pearly round rice)

== Taiwanese varieties ==
- Glutinous rice

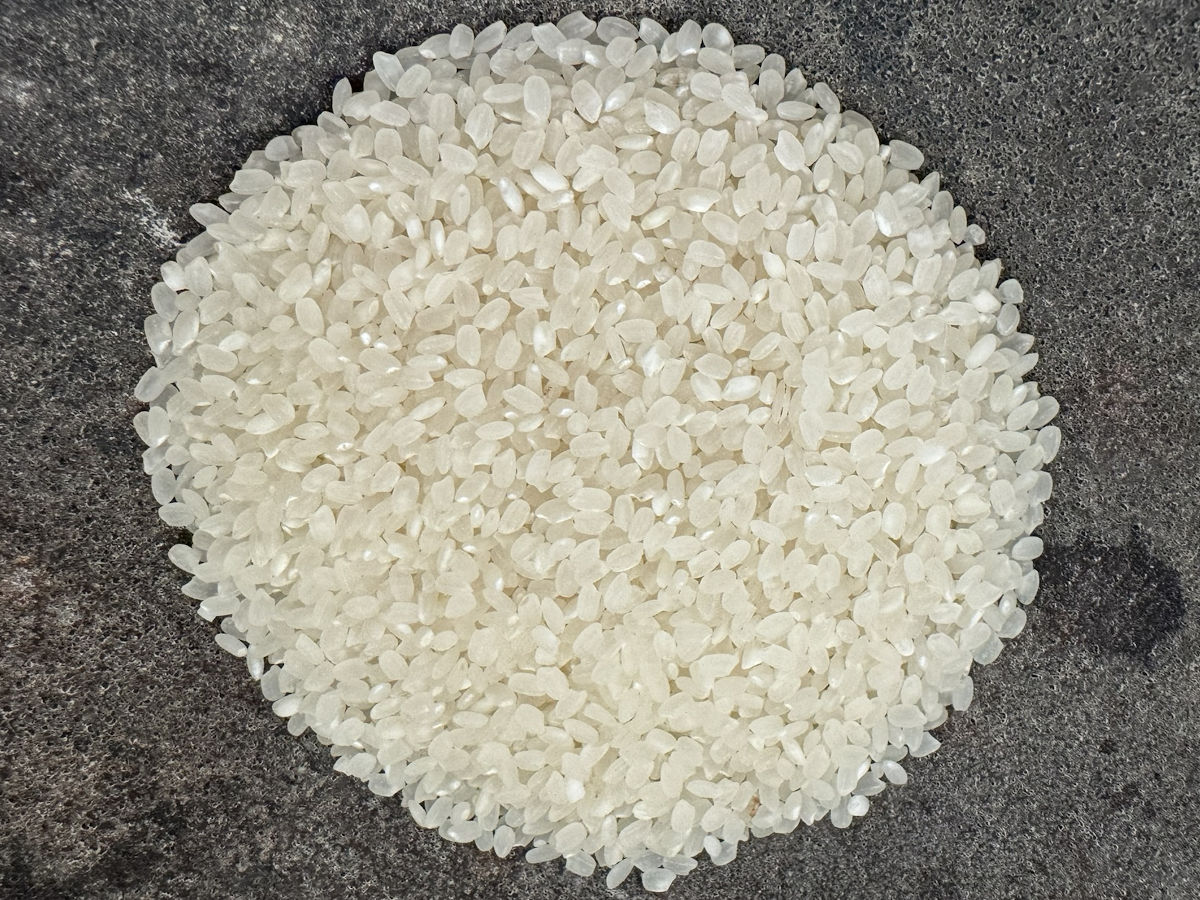
Penglai rice

- Penglai rice

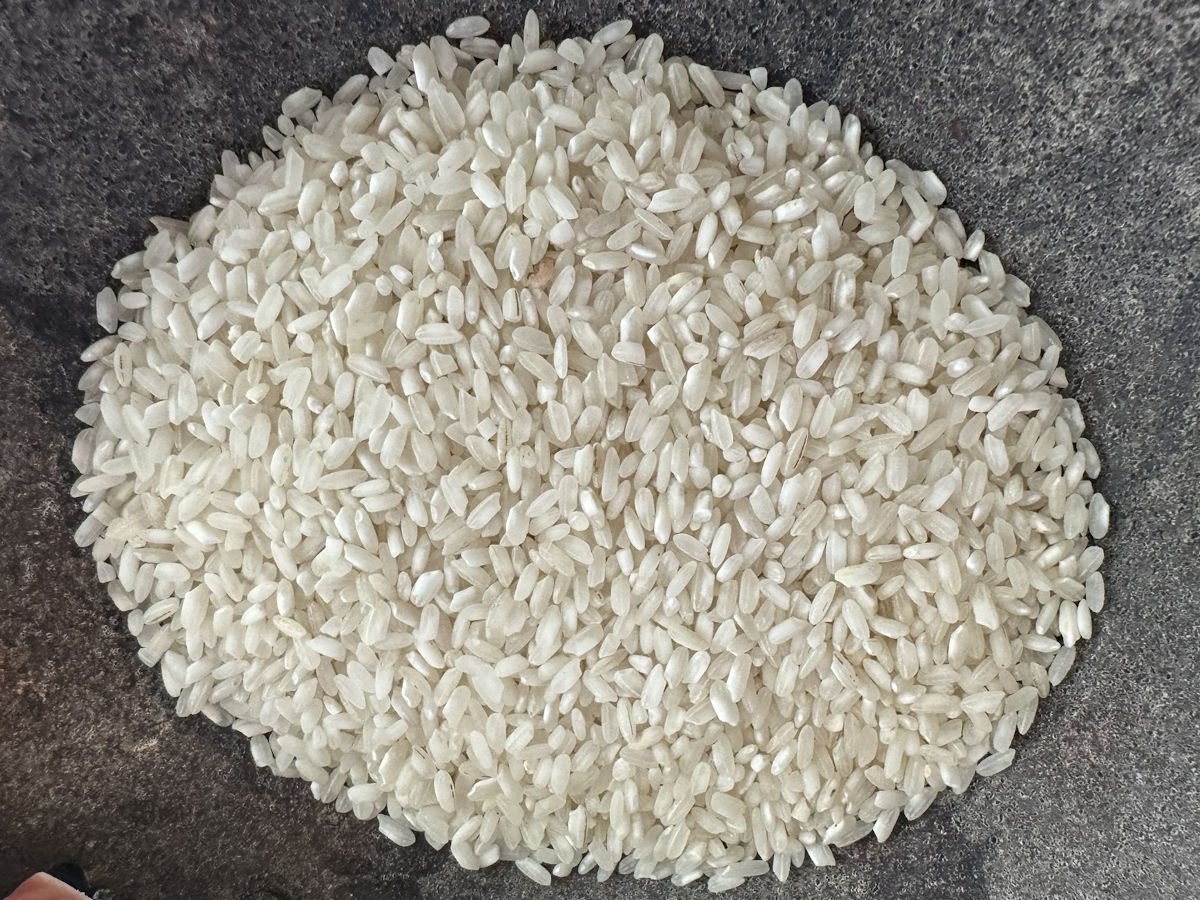
Zailai rice

- Zailai rice

== Thai varieties ==
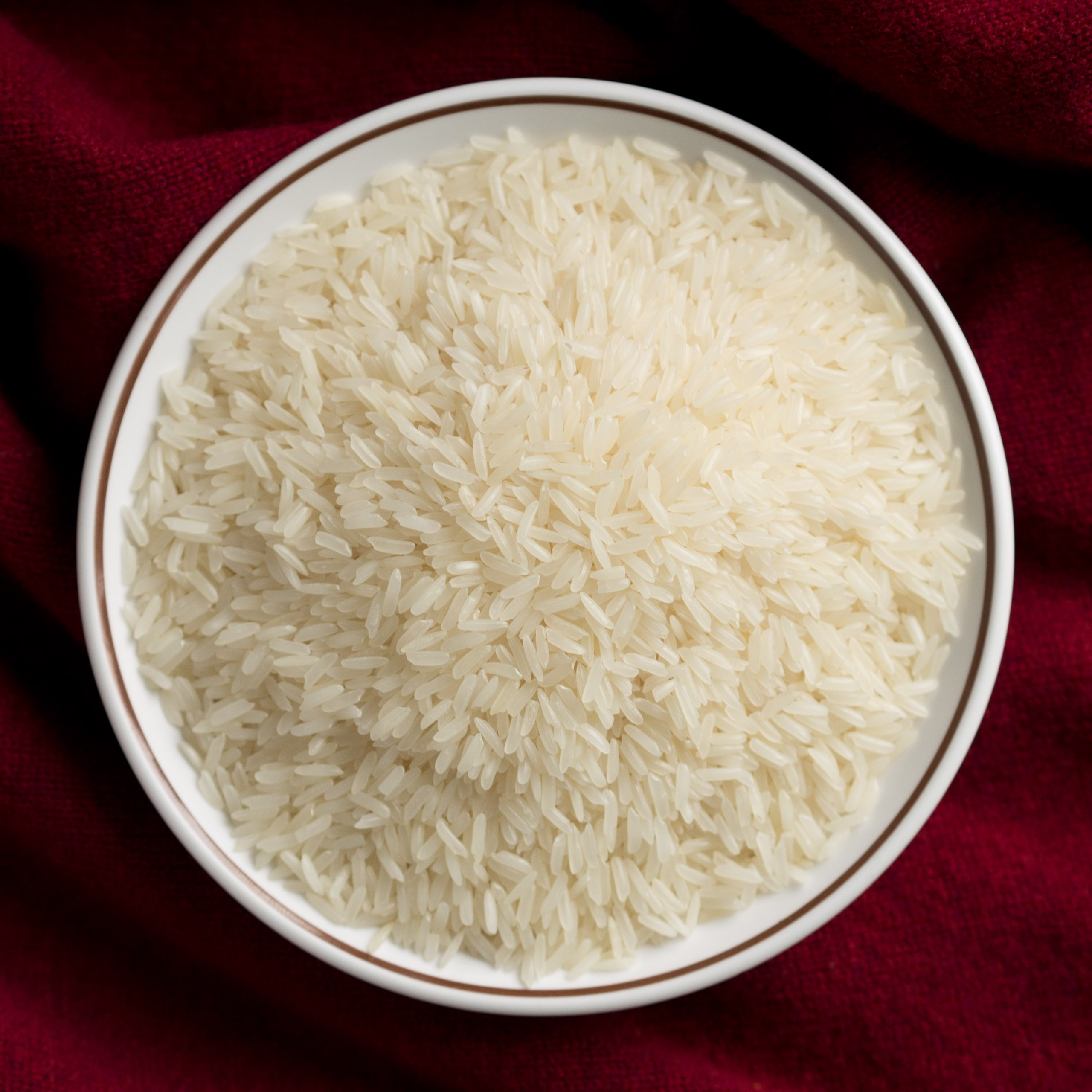
Jasmine rice from Thailand

- Black glutinous rice
- Jasmine rice
- Red Cargo rice
- Riceberry
- White glutinous rice

== Vietnamese varieties ==
- Dự Hương Rice
- Nàng Thơm Chợ Đào Rice
  - grown in Mỹ Lệ commune, Cần Đước district, Long An province
- Nếp cái hoa vàng
  - Grown in Nam Dinh province
- Nếp cẩm Rice
- Nếp Tú Lệ
- Tài Nguyên Rice
  - Grown in Long An province
- Tám Xoan Rice
  - Grown in Hải Hậu district, Nam Dinh province
- ST24 Rice – Top 3 world's best rice awarded in 2018
- ST25 Rice – The 1st world's best rice awarded 2019 and 2023
  - Cultivated in Sóc Trăng province – Mekong Delta (Southern Vietnam), researched and developed by Hồ Quang Cua and his team.
    - Long grain rice that is fragrant and soft.

== See also ==
- International Code of Nomenclature for Cultivated Plants
- List of rice diseases
- Lists of cultivars
