= Kullakar rice =

Ancient rice variety

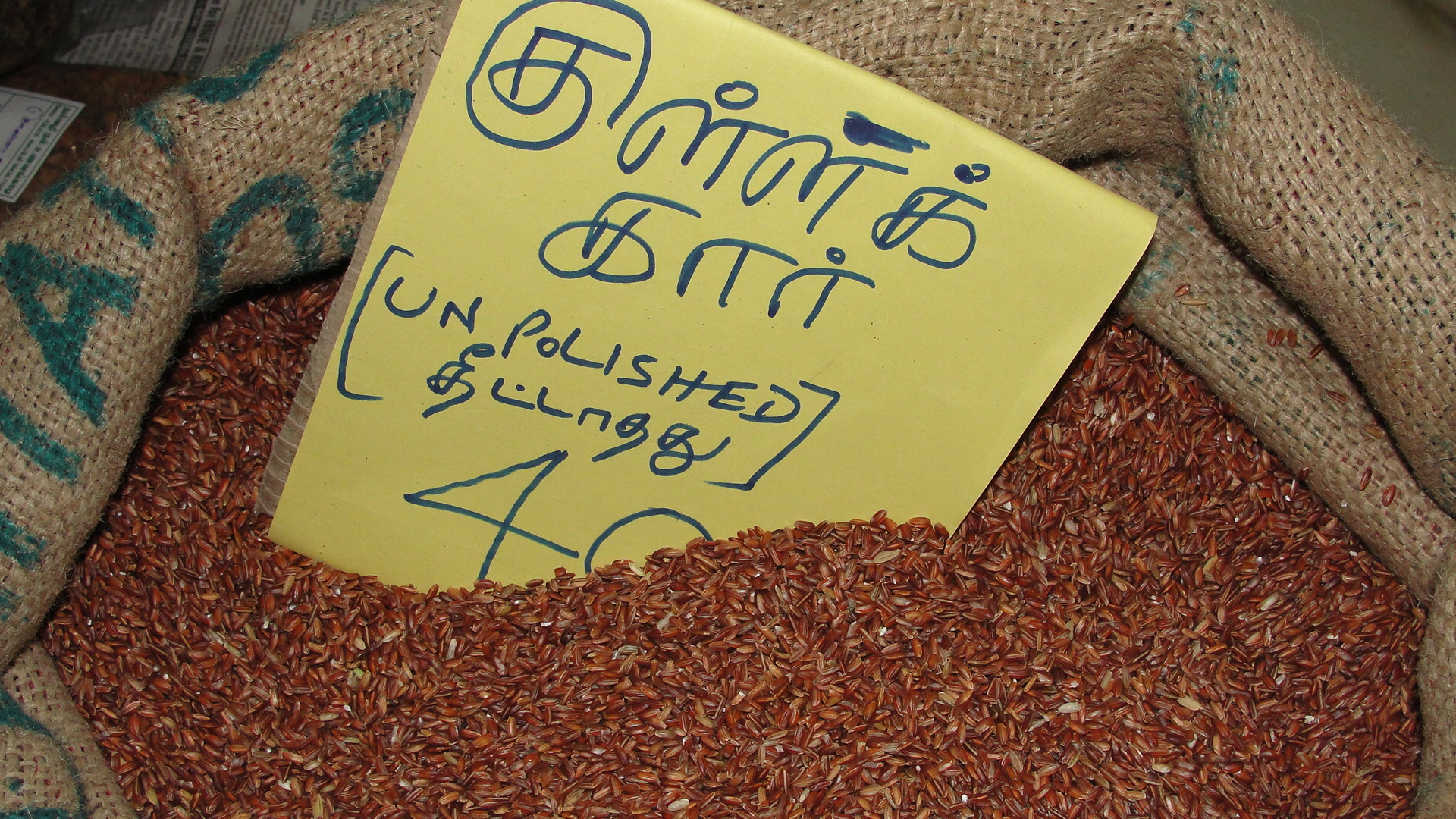
- Kullakar rice
- Species: Oryza sativa
- Origin: Tamil Nadu, India

Kullakar rice is an ancient rice variety, indigenous to and primarily cultivated within India. It is one of the red rice varieties that grow in the South Indian state of Tamil Nadu.

Kullakar is drought- and pest-resistant, though it is susceptible to waterlogging and requires soil with good drainage.

The rice takes between 100 and 110 days to reach maturity and measures a maximum of 120 cm when fully grown. Due to its short growth duration, it can be grown all year long, though it is usually cultivated in the summer.

== Etymology ==
The name "Kullakar" is derived from the word "kuttai–" meaning short. It is attributed to the small size of the plant when it is fully grown. .

== Uses ==
This variety of rice can be used to prepare rice cakes such as idli, dosa, paddu, noodle dishes such as idiyappam and it can also be made into a porridge. Its straws are locally used as a roofing material.

== Nutrition ==
The Kullakar rice variety is higher in potassium (291.6 mg/100g), calcium (50.40 mg/100g), zinc (2.59 mg/100g), and iron than polished white rice. It contains complex carbohydrates, which take more time to digest. Kullakar has very high flavonoid content (176±6.12 μg/mL) and thiamine content (0.53±0.01 mg/100g).
