= Boka Chaul =

Type of short-grained rice from Assam, India

- Geographical indication
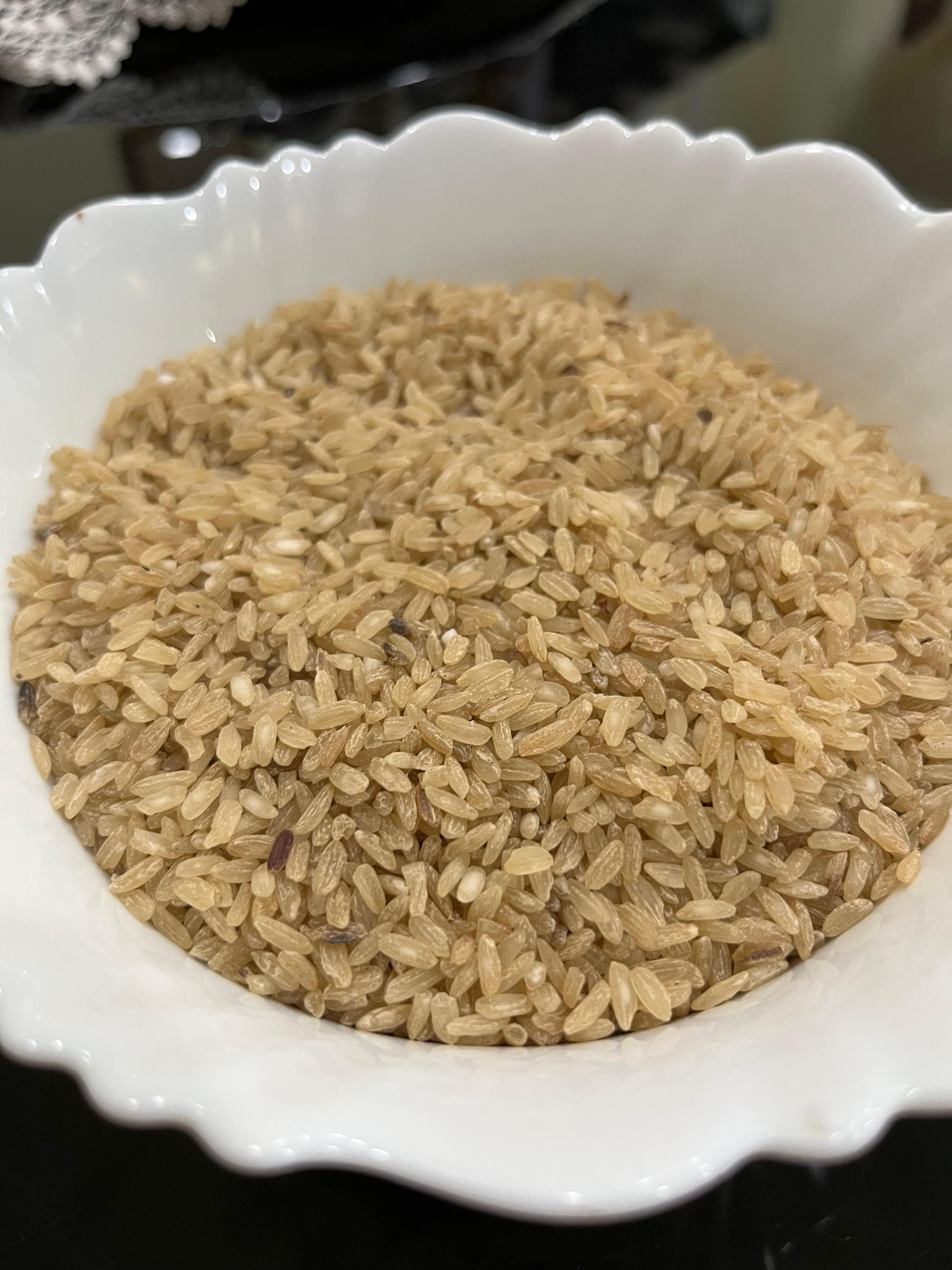
- Close-up of Boka Chaul rice
- Alternative names: Boka, Banta Boka, Bhokhoorie Boka, Boka jahinga, Jokhoroo boka, Khamti boka, Laobuka, Para chakhua, Ranga bokadha, Ronga boka, Santi boka, Booka, Baga jhul and Boga
- Description: Boka Chaul is a rice variety cultivated in Assam
- Area: Assam
- Country: India
- Registered: 30 July 2018
- Official website: ipindia.gov.in

Boka Chaul is a variety of short-grained rice mainly grown in the Indian state of Assam. It is a common and widely cultivated crop in the Lower Brahmaputra Valley Zone of Assam, encompassing the districts of Dhubri, Kokrajhar, Chirang, Bongaigaon, Goalpara, Barpeta, Nalbari, Baksa, Kamrup Rural, Kamrup Metropolitan, Darrang, and Udalguri falling in Lower Assam division. Boka Chaul is a brand or group name associated with a specific type of parboiled rice. This rice is produced by parboiling whole grains of a winter rice variety called Boka dhan. Soaking the kernels in cold water (at ambient temperature) is sufficient to prepare Boka chaul for consumption.

Under its Geographical Indication tag, it is referred to as "Boka Chaul".

== Name ==
Boka chaul, literally translated as "soft rice" in the local state language of Assamese, derives its name from the word "Boka" meaning "mud" - reflecting the soft texture of the rice while "Chaul" means rice.

== Description ==
Boka Chaul, sometimes described as the "Magic Rice", which gains a soft, cooked rice-like texture when soaked in tepid water for a few minutes. This is the product of its low amylose content, the starch responsible for the firmness of rice grains.

Boka Chaul is widely cultivated in the Lower Brahmaputra Valley Zone, which has high amounts of sediments.

In the 17th century it was eaten for sustenance by Ahom soldiers while fighting the invading Mughal army. It is today made into a breakfast called Boka chaular Jalpan, eaten with curd, jaggery, or other accompaniments.

== Geographical indication ==
It was awarded the Geographical Indication (GI) status tag from the Geographical Indications Registry, under the Union Government of India, on 30 July 2018 and is valid until 24 July 2026.

Lotus Progressive Centre (LPC) and Centre for Environment Education (CEE) from Guwahati, proposed the GI registration of Boka Chaul. After filing the application in July 2018, the rice was granted the GI tag in 2023 by the Geographical Indications Registry in Chennai, making the name "Boka Chaul" exclusive to the rice grown in the region. It thus became the second rice variety from Assam after Joha rice and the seventh type of goods from Assam to earn the GI tag.

The GI tag protects the rice from illegal selling and marketing, and gives it legal protection and a unique identity.
