= Penglai rice =

Rice cultivar

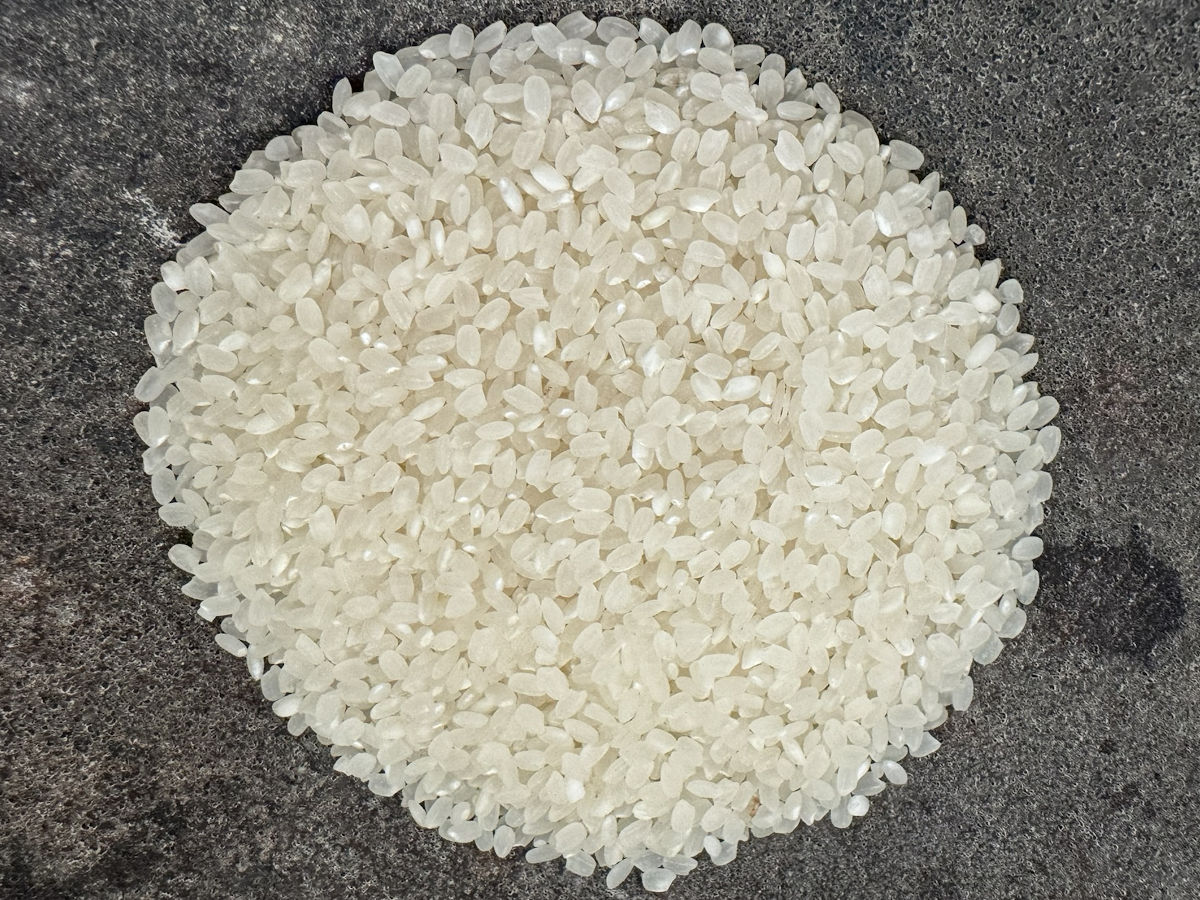
- Species: Oryza sativa
- Cultivar: Penglai
- Origin: 1921 Zhuzihu, Taipei

Penglai rice (Chinese: 蓬萊米, hông-lâi-mí), also called Ponglai or Hōrai rice, is the most popular rice cultivar in Taiwan. It accounts for over 90% of local rice production, far more than the two other major types of rice planted and consumed in Taiwan, zailai rice and glutinous rice.

Penglai rice is a hybrid produced by crossbreeding between strains of the subspecies Oryza sativa subsp. japonica (japonica rice). It was initially developed by the Japanese when Taiwan was under Japanese colonial rule because the colonizers preferred the taste of their home-grown japonica rice. But japonica rice's sensitivity to day-length did not allow it to grow well in Taiwan's long hours of sunlight and subtropical climate. In 1921, Japanese researchers Eikichi Iso, known as "father of penglai rice", and his colleague Megumu Suenaga (末永仁), known as "mother of penglai rice", began to crossbreed two strains of highland japonica rice, the "Kameji" and the "Sinliki", eventually producing a hybrid "Taichung No. 65" (T65) that was well adapted to Taiwan's lowland soils. A mutation enabled the new cultivar to be insensitive to day-length, unlike its parental strains, allowing it to yield two harvests per year.

This hybrid was named "penglai rice" after the mythical Mount Penglai that some believed to represent Taiwan. Most of the modern penglai rice varieties currently grown in Taiwan are descendants of T65.

Penglai rice is a short-grained variety whose amylopectin content, which affects its stickiness, is between that of zailai rice and glutinous rice, making it the preferred rice to the locals as well as to the Japanese. Its moderate stickiness also makes it suitable for making sushi, brewing beer, etc.
