= Fast-ripening rice =

Fast ripening rice is a type of rice that ripens faster than other strains. It is also able to withstand abiotic factors, such as temperatures (hot and cold), floods, droughts, and salinity. Fast-ripening rice was discovered in China during the Song dynasty.

== History ==
New developments in rice cultivation during the Song dynasty in China, such as new strains of rice and better methods of water control and irrigation, greatly increased rice yields. Champa rice, which belongs to the aus subspecies and ripens faster than regular rice, originated in this time. Farmers were able to grow two or three crops annually on the same field. As a result, more food became available and the Chinese population grew. Champa rice was also used to preserve food and wine.
