= Ponni rice =

Variety of rice

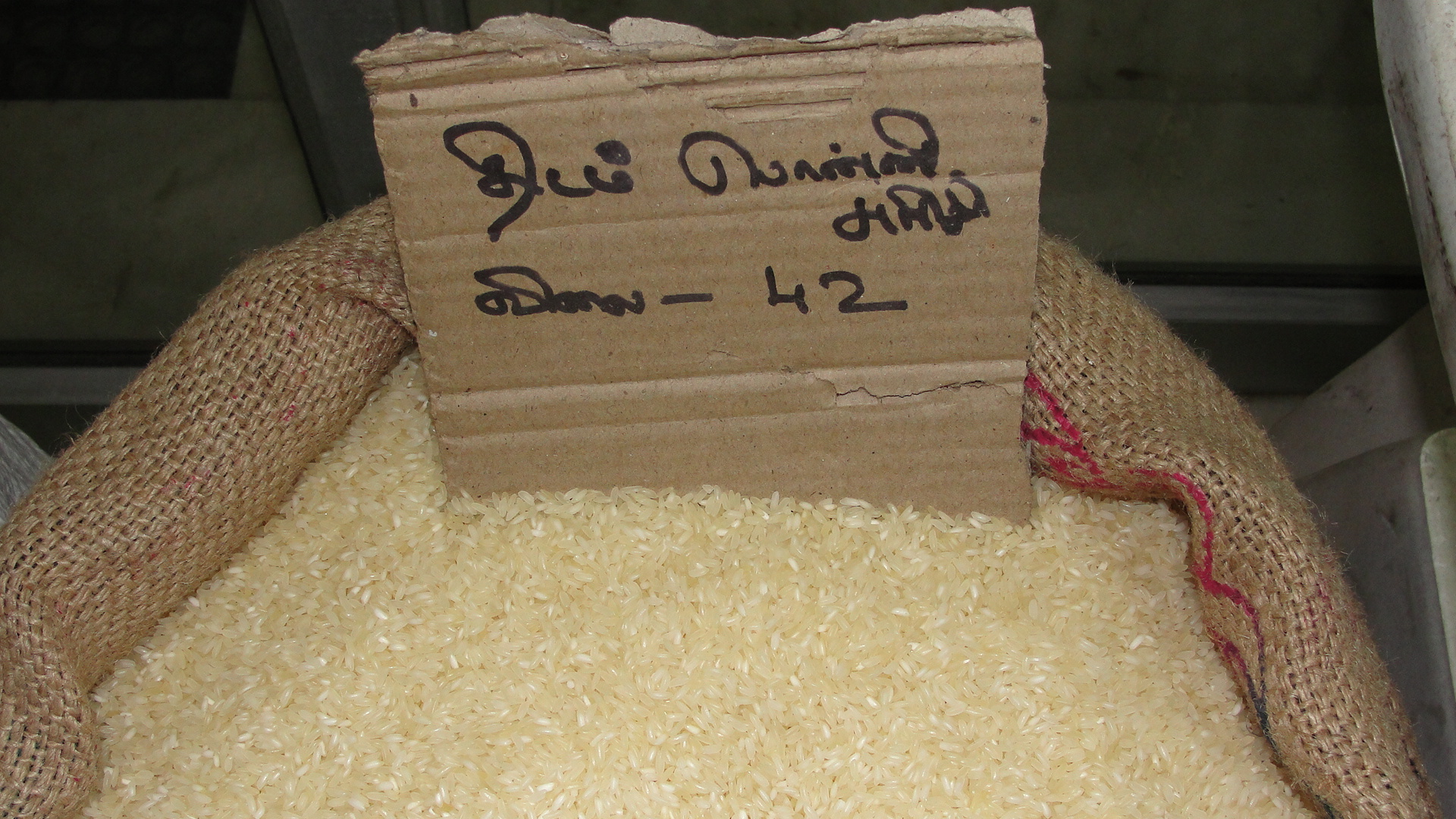
A bag of Ponni Rice

Ponni rice is a variety of rice developed by Tamil Nadu Agricultural University in 1986. It is widely cultivated in Tamil Nadu, India and is a hybrid variety of Taichung 65 and Myang Ebos 6080/2. Since the Kaveri River is also called 'Ponni' in Tamil literature, the rice could have been named after the river. The rice is mostly cultivated along the banks of Kaveri in the cities of Ariyalur, Trichy, Madurai and its mouth.

== Description ==
The crop requires a growing time of 130-135 days and is considered a slightly low yield variety than other commercial coarse rice. It has a maximum yield potential of 7.4 tonne per hectare and shows a robust resistance against rice diseases like the Tungrovirus (yellowing of leaves). It responds exceptionally well towards natural nutrient supply and is preferred by organic farmers.

== See also ==
- List of rice varieties
