= Champa rice =

Rice variety

Champa rice is a quick-maturing, drought resistant rice that can allow two harvests of sixty days each per growing season. Champa rice is from the aus sub-population, which shares similarities with both the japonica and the indica rice varieties. Likely originating from Eastern India, Champa rice was introduced into Song China as a tribute gift from the Champa Kingdom during the reign of emperor Zhenzong (r. 997-1022). Song dynasty officials gave the quick-growing champa rice to peasants across China in order to boost their crop yields, and its rapid growth time was crucial in feeding the burgeoning Chinese population of over 100 million. Champa rice spread with the help of merchants transporting the rice throughout the Silk Road.

== See also ==
- List of rice varieties
- Fast ripening rice
