= Gerdeh (rice) =

Rice variety being cultivated in Iran

Gerdeh is a rice cultivar that is cultivated in Iran. It is named from its short and spheroidal seed, in contrast to other Iranian cultivars. Gerdeh means roundish or sphere-like in Persian. Presumably, this cultivar originated in Tarom, a town in Zanjan State of Iran. This cultivar is considered to be a landrace.
