= Red rice =

Rice that is naturally a red color

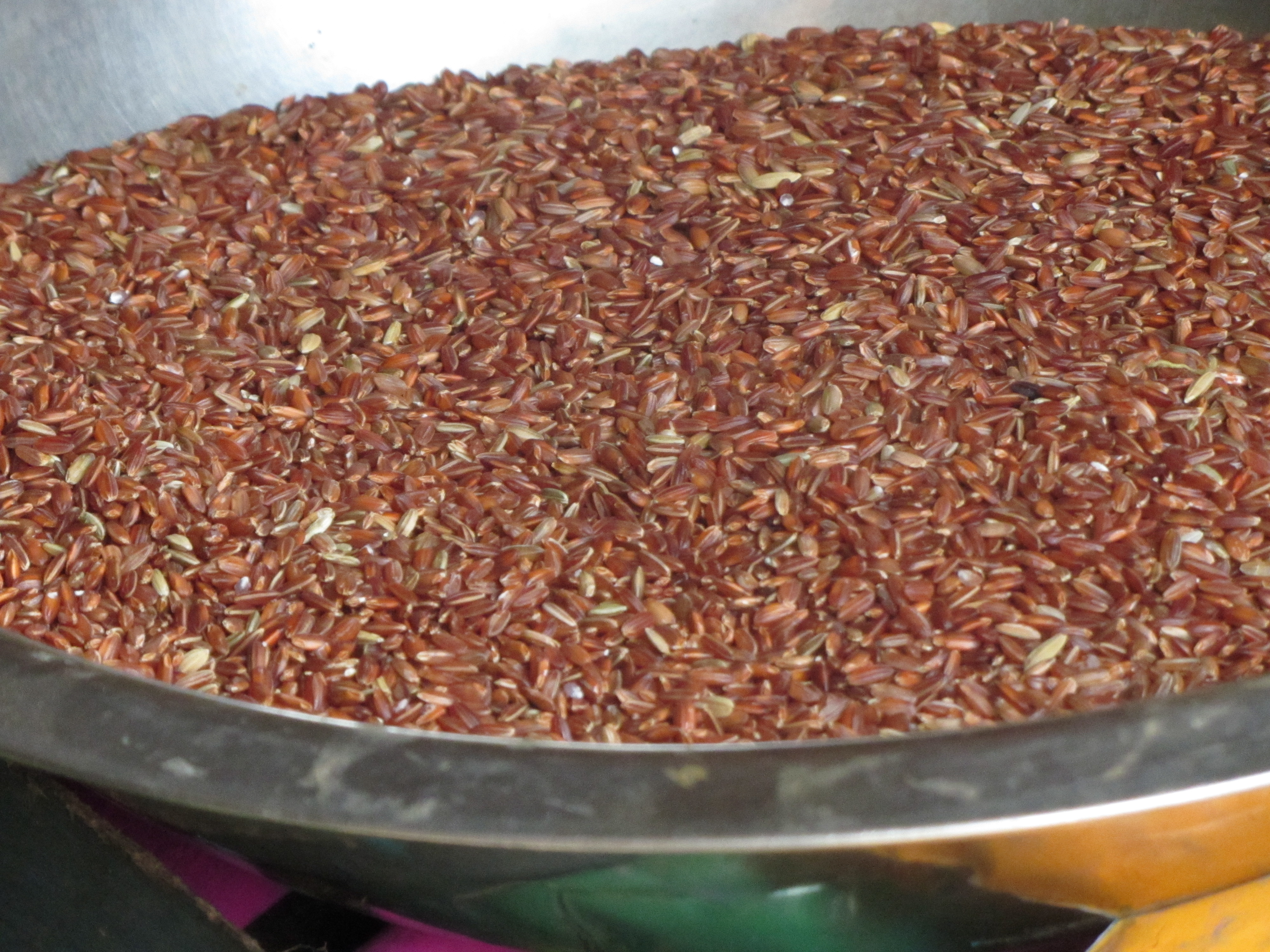
Red rice

Red rice is rice that is colored red due to natural anthocyanin content. It is usually eaten unpolished or partially polished and has a red bran layer, rather than the more common pale brown (brown rice). Red rice has a nutty flavor. It has the highest nutritional value among rices eaten with the bran intact.

== Health claims ==
Some strains of red rice, when eaten dehusked (analogous to ordinary brown rice), have a lower glycemic index compared to white rice (Basmati and Jasmine), which is polished. However, research also indicates that polishing red rice removes this difference.

Red rice contains higher antioxidant levels compared to white rice, though what they actually do in the human body is unclear.

Dehusked red rice is also a richer source of iron, magnesium, calcium and zinc than white rice. The same can be said of ordinary brown rice.

== Varieties ==
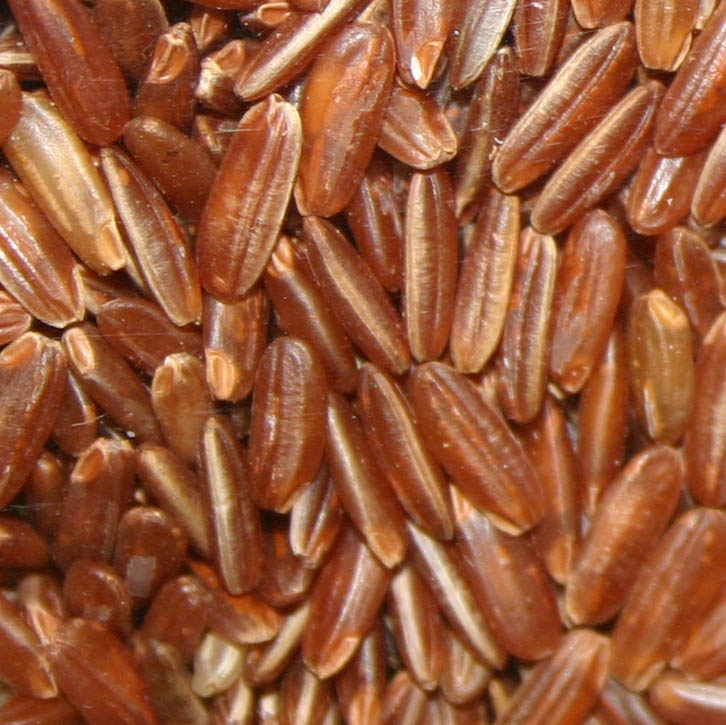
Oryza glaberrima, also known as African red rice

Varieties of red rice include:

- Oryza glaberrima, also known as African red rice.
- Oryza longistaminata, also known as red rice.
- Oryza punctata, also known as red rice.
- Oryza rufipogon, also known as wild rice and red rice.
- Red rice, also known as weedy rice, a low-yielding rice variety that persists as a weed in fields of better-quality rice.
- Varieties of Oryza sativa:
  - Rakthashali, a rare rice variety of Indian rice, often mentioned in Ayurveda and Hinduism.
  - Thai Red Cargo rice, a non-glutinous long grain rice variety.
  - Bhutanese red rice, a medium-grain rice grown in the Kingdom of Bhutan in the eastern Himalayas.
  - Camargue red rice, a relatively new variety of rice cultivated in the wetlands of the Camargue region of southern France.
  - Matta rice Kerala Matta rice, also known as Rosematta rice, Palakkadan Matta rice, Kerala Red rice, and Red parboiled rice, is an indigenous variety of rice grown in Palakkad District of Kerala. It is popular in Kerala and Sri Lanka, where it is used for idlies and appams, and eaten plain.Matta rice is mostly eaten in Kerala and in Dakshina Kannada and Udupi district of Karnataka state, India. Some natives of these regions settled elsewhere also prefer Matta rice as staple food.
  - Ulikan or mini-angan, heirloom red rice from Ifugao and Kalinga, Philippines.
  - Arroz da terra, an heirloom red rice cultivated in Northeastern Brazil (States of Rio Grande do Norte and Paraíba) since the 16th century.
  - Malaysia red rice varieties are Udang Besar, Udang Halus, Katek Merah, Silah Merah, MRQ98, MRQ99, MRQ 100 and UKMRC-9. UKMRC-9 is the new red rice varieties in Malaysia, developed through plant breeding program.

The red pericarp trait is very common among various Oryza species, including among the wild ancestors of the cultivated O. sativa. Red rices typically also show seed shattering, an undesirable trait for grain production as well as dormancy (which allows it to persist as a weed in fields). It turns out that the red color and shattering are controlled by different genes; their close association is simply due to their proximity on the chromosome and reduced chromosomal recombination leading to genetic linkage.

== Dishes ==
- Red Rice, a traditional Gullah Lowcountry dish, similar to West African jollof rice.

== See also ==
- Wehani rice, a variety of aromatic brown rice developed in the late 20th century.
- Red yeast rice, white rice fermented with a red mold, used in East Asian cuisine and Chinese traditional medicine, with anti-cholesterol properties.
- Some of the Asian liquors known as arrack are made by fermentation of red rice.
- Matta rice mostly used in Kerala and in Dakshina Kannada and Udupi district of Karnataka state, India.
