= Joha rice =

Indian rice variety

- Geographical indication
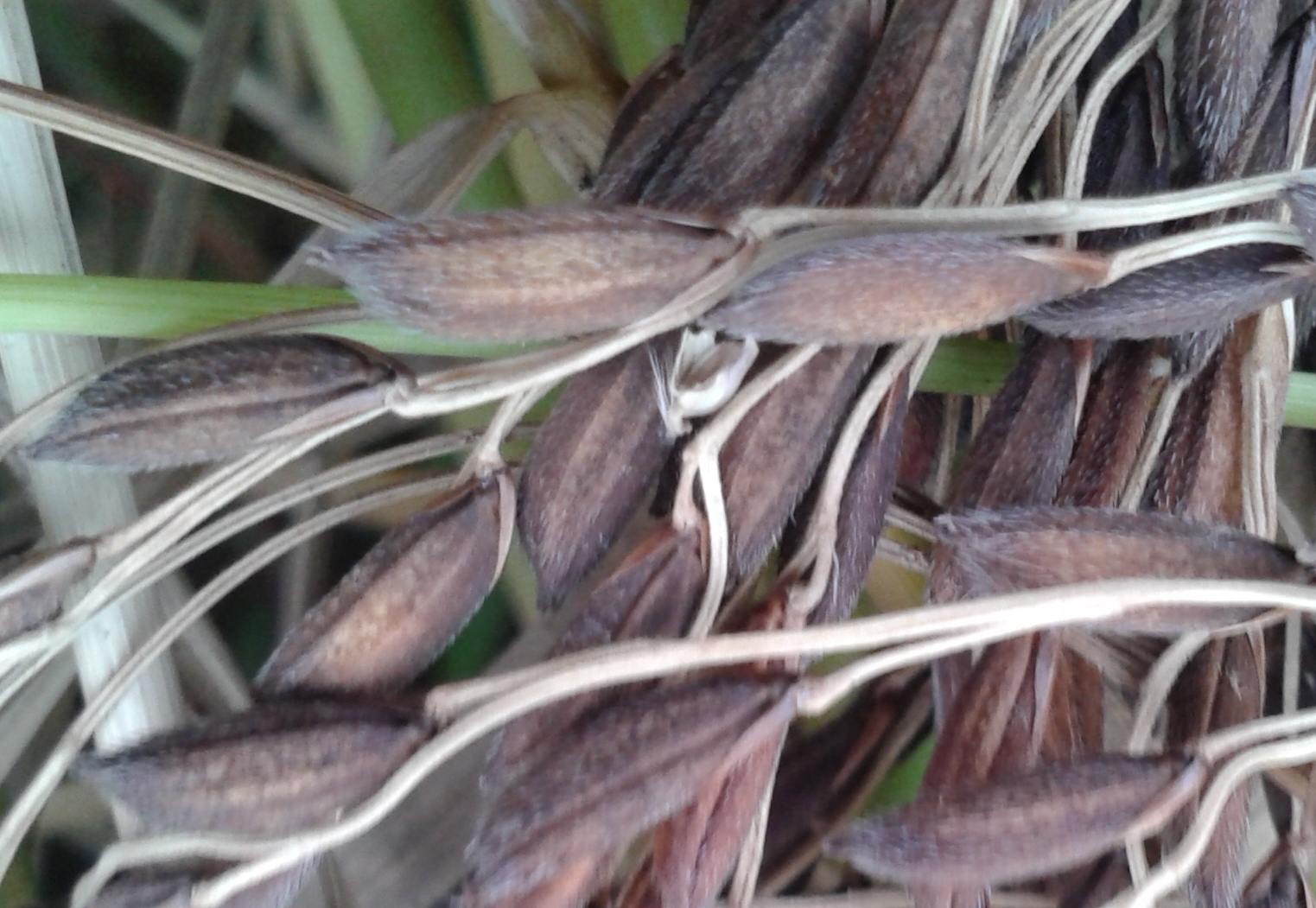
- Close-up of Joha rice
- Description: Joha Chaul is a rice variety cultivated in Assam
- Area: Assam
- Country: India

Joha (zoha saul) is a variety of rice grown in India, notable for its aroma and delicate taste. Assam is the largest cultivator of this rice; it is primarily grown through paddy field farming. In Garo Hills it is widely cultivated and known as jaha rice or locally known as mi jaha.

== Description ==
Joha rice is known for its super fine kernels exceptional palability and distinct natural fragrance driven by the presence of 2 (BADH2). it is traditionally valued for its superior cooking properties and unique aroma. most native cultivars are late-maturing tall and low-yielding, prompting ongoing research for their conversation and crop improvement.

== Varieties ==
There are various traditional types of joha rice available in Assam. Kola Joha, Boga Joha, Rampal Joha, Kon Joha, Manikimodhuri Joha, Keteki Joha, Tulokhi Joha, Govinda Tulokhi Joha and Ghuguli Joha.

== See also ==
- List of rice varieties
