= Bhutanese red rice =

Medium-grain rice grown in Bhutan

Cooked Bhutanese red rice

Bhutanese red rice (bja maap) is a medium-grain rice grown in the Kingdom of Bhutan in the eastern Himalayas. It is the staple rice of the Bhutanese people, especially in western Bhutan.

The rice is reddish-pink in color and very high in fiber. It can grow at high elevations, past 1,800 metres (5,900 ft) for certain varieties.

== Health and nutrient facts ==
As a whole grain, Bhutanese red rice has been shown to help maintain a healthy weight. In addition to being free of gluten, Bhutanese red rice is a great source of protein, potassium, manganese, selenium, calcium, magnesium, iron, zinc, B vitamins, and fiber.It is also known to have higher levels of iron and zinc than rice that is white, black, or brown.

== Cultivation ==
Bhutanese red rice is often grown above 1,500 metres (4,900 ft) in elevation, historically in the districts of Paro, Punakha, and Wangdi. There are many different cultivars of Bhutanese red rice, including Bajo Maap 1 & 2, Khangma Maap, Yusi Ray Maap 1 & 2, and Matshob. Of these, Yusi Ray Maap 1 has the highest elevation tolerance and is able to grow above 1,800 metres (5,900 ft). The Matshob cultivar is generally preferred for traditional dishes due to its flavor.

== Description and uses ==
Bhutanese red rice is a red japonica rice. It is semi-milled—some of the reddish bran is left on the rice. Because of this, it cooks somewhat faster than an unmilled brown rice. When cooked, the rice is pale pink, soft and slightly sticky. It has been described as having a similar texture to brown rice, with a mild roasted nut flavor. In traditional Bhutanese cuisine it is often served with mushrooms and hot chilies. In 2018, Namgay Artisanal Brewery, run by Djori Gyeltshen in Paro, began making lager from red rice. The lager has been described as brown-colored, less bitter, and sweeter than other beers.

=== As an export ===
Red rice was Bhutans most popular export to the North America and Europe, with one exporter sending 100 metric tons (220,000 lb) to the United States in 2007 and a total of 117,000 kilograms (258,000 lb) of red rice being exported from Bhutan to the United States in 2013. In 2023 the total amount of red rice exported had fallen to 1,289 kilograms (2,842 lb), 932 kilograms (2,055 lb) of which was sent to Switzerland.

== See also ==
- Red rice
