= Abakaliki rice =

Type of rice found in Abakaliki, Nigeria

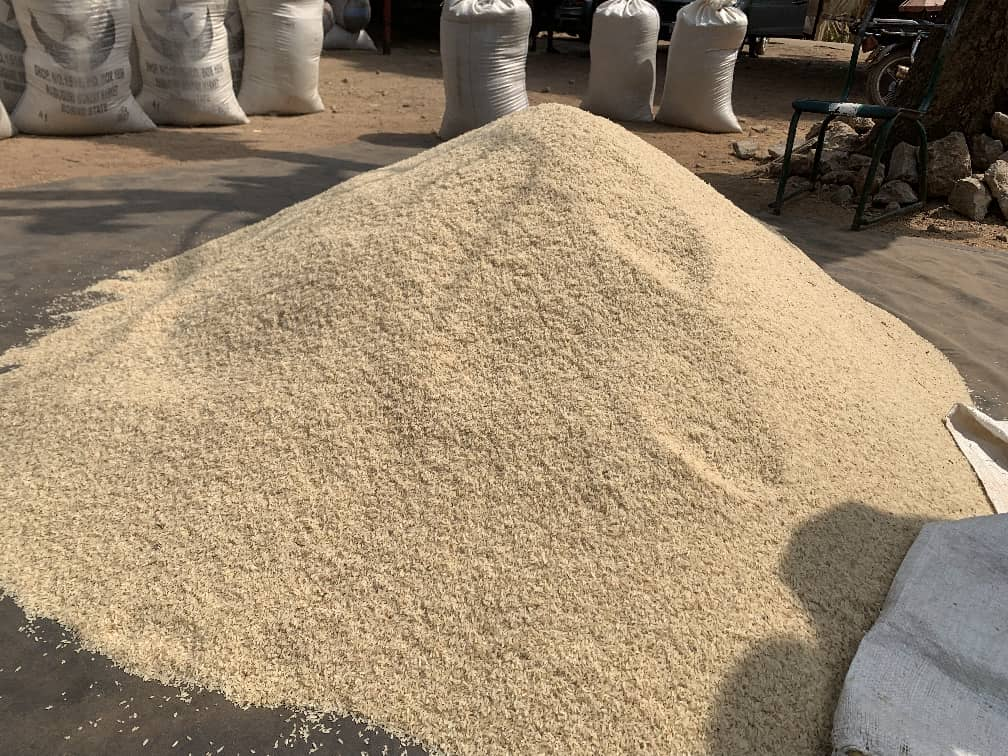
A heap of freshly milled Abakaliki rice awaits bagging.

Abakaliki Rice is a type of rice cultivated predominantly in Ebonyi State, located in South Eastern Nigeria. Named after Abakaliki town, the State's capital, the term refers to all rice grown and cultivated within the 13 local government areas of the state.

Known for its unique flavour and high dietary fibre content, Abakaliki rice is used in a wide range of dishes. The region's warm climate allows for at least two cultivation cycles annually, contributing to its fast growth rate compared to varieties grown in other regions.

== Agricultural Significance ==
Rice farming in Abakaliki accounts for more than 50 per cent of agricultural activities in Ebonyi State, with an estimated annual production of 134,000 metric tonnes.

The Abakaliki rice mill, a major processing hub, operates 4,500 milling machines, 50 destoning centres, and 10 polishing machines, employing approximately 1,850 workers directly and indirectly.

== History ==
The cultivation of Abakaliki rice dates back to 1940 during Nigeria's colonial era. Faced with global food shortages during World War II, the British colonial government sought to boost local food production. Following a Department of Agriculture meeting in Umuahia, Abakaliki, Afikpo, and Ohaozara were identified as suitable areas for rice cultivation due to their swampy soils.

Before the introduction of rice to the Abakaliki area, the people were mostly subsistence farmers whose major crops included staples such as yam, cassava, potato, cocoyam, etc. Therefore, local farmers initially resisted rice farming due to cultural and religious beliefs. For instance, some Izzi-speaking farmers feared that replacing traditional yam crops might anger ancestral deities. Similarly, Ezza farmers attributed poor yam harvests in the 1950s to the introduction of rice. However, external settlers leased land for rice farming and introduced improved techniques, eventually winning over local farmers. By 1945, rice farming in Abakaliki began to expand, with the colonial government increasing cultivation from 600 acres in 1940 to 18,000 acres by 1954.

Abakaliki farmers eventually embraced rice cultivation as they realized that rice was easier to cultivate and matured faster compared to yam and cassava. It was also more profitable. The abundant rainfall of about 1500mm annually in the Abakaliki area, which enabled rice to be grown in fairly level, clay soil without artificial irrigation, also enhanced its appeal to the farmers.

The colonial government drove rice cultivation from 600 acres in the Abakaliki division to 18,000 acres in 1954, and cultivated 20,000 acres within the next five years, while the number of rice mills rose to 95.

== Abakaliki Rice Varieties ==
Abakaliki rice takes its root from the Asian Oryza sativa and the African Oryza glaberrima.

The varieties include FARO 1, FARO 44, FARO 57, NERICA 19, and WAB 189-B-B-8-HB, among others, many of which were introduced by colonial authorities and missionaries. Other varieties include 306, Iron, Mars, R8, CP, Mandela, Brown rice and Geisha.

== Culinary Uses ==
Abakaliki rice dish is an everyday food in Ebonyi State and across Nigeria and is traditionally served as jollof rice. The Abakaliki rice dish is also served as white rice and stew. The stew can be a fresh or canned tomato stew, or a vegetable sauce of tomato, fresh pepper, onions, seasonings, meat, spices, pumpkin, crayfish, vegetable oil, salt, etc. A dish of Abakaliki rice is also served with fried plantain, or cooked together with white, brown, or honey beans as jollof rice or as white rice and beans. The rice is also served as a side in a beef, chevon, or chicken pepper soup dish. It is also served with pepper soup as the stew.

== Economic impact ==
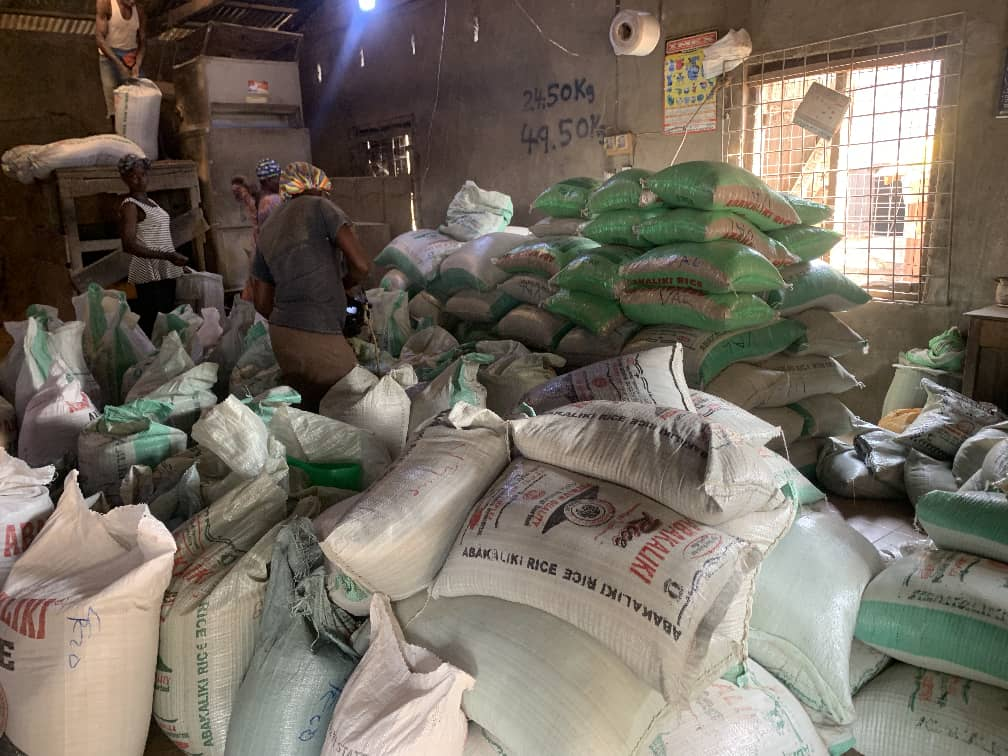
Bags of Abakaliki rice awaits transportation to the market

Rice is the most significant cash crop in Ebonyi State..

Historically, Abakaliki rice was a vital export commodity. Rice export from Abakaliki to Ghana in 1965 is estimated to have fetched approximately £3 million for the eastern region government under Dr. Michael Okpara.

== Abakaliki Rice Mill ==
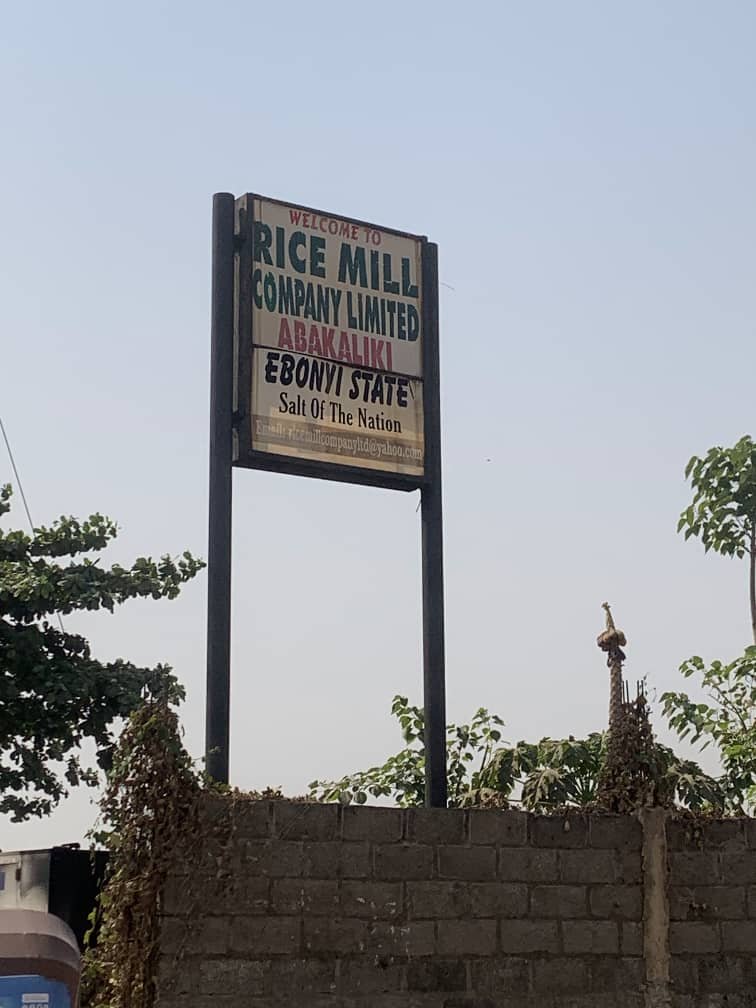
A sign post in front of the Abakaliki rice mill

Established in 1964, the Abakaliki Rice Mill operates on 1,938.464 square metres under the Abakaliki Rice Mill Company Ltd. The mill processes up to 11,000 metric tonnes of rice per month, with individual machines capable of producing over 140 bushels in four hours. The mill is managed by the Rice Mill Owners Association, which oversees operations and quality standards.
