= Molakolukulu =

Variety of rice cultivated in India

Sanna, laavu Molakolukulu (molagolukulu) is a variety of rice cultivated in Andhra Pradesh in India. This variety is often called nellore molakolukulu perhaps due to its origin in the Nellore region of Andhra Pradesh. It has been a popular variety in Nellore, and has been formally developed into better varieties since 1937.

The variety is known for improved capacity in handling monsoon season rainfall. However its popularity has diminished due to farmer's moving to grow shorter duration crops.

== Research ==
Researchers at the Acharya NG Ranga agriculture research station in Nellore developed an improved strain designated as NLR 3186 to address the historical drawbacks of the traditional variety. This updated variety reduces the crop duration to 150 days down from the traditional 170, and also correct its lodging tendencies and introduces resistance to blast disease without tip sterility.

Research is also ongoing at the Rice Research Station in Nellore to develop new fine-grain varieties, such as the pest-resistant NLR 4001 and an aromatic strain called 'Nellore Sugandha' NLR 40054.
