= Patna rice =

Variety of long-grain rice

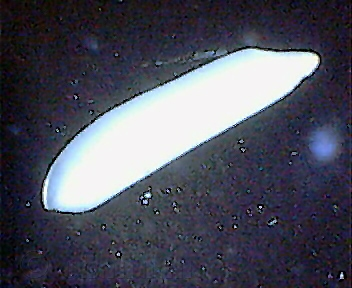
A single grain of patna rice

Patna rice, a variety of the species Oryza sativa, and one of the varieties of long-grain white rice, is extensively cultivated in the Indo-Gangetic plains, in and around Patna, capital of Bihar state, India. Patna rice is known for its elongated kernel with grain length greater than 6 mm, and has been used as staple food by the local people for a long time. Sometimes, Patna rice is also called Parimal rice locally.

This mildly flavoured rice comes from the Bihar region of the Ganges plains. It has a robust, long and narrow, opaque grain that keeps its shape well for curries. Basmati rice is closely related to the Patna rice but has a stronger aroma.

The Mughal chronicler Abul Fazal who collected the various types of rice grown in the Gangetic belt has described the rice cultivated in Patna in glowing terms. William Fullarton of Skeldon UK made his fortune by dealing in Patna rice. He chose Patna as the name of the coal-miners' hamlet he built in East Ayrshire, Scotland.

Since most of the rice sold in Europe came from this region at one time, the term "Patna rice" also sometimes loosely designates any long-grain aromatic rice.

Another example of long-grain rice is American long-grain rice which include Carolina rice. It is believed that Patna rice was the first type of rice cultivated in America, and acquired the name Carolina rice. The seeds of Patna rice were taken to America, grown in Carolina and exported to Britain before the American Civil War. Thus the term Carolina rice is also sometimes used to denote this variety of rice.

== See also ==
- Basmati
- Roma rice
