= Sona masuri rice =

Medium-grain rice grown in India

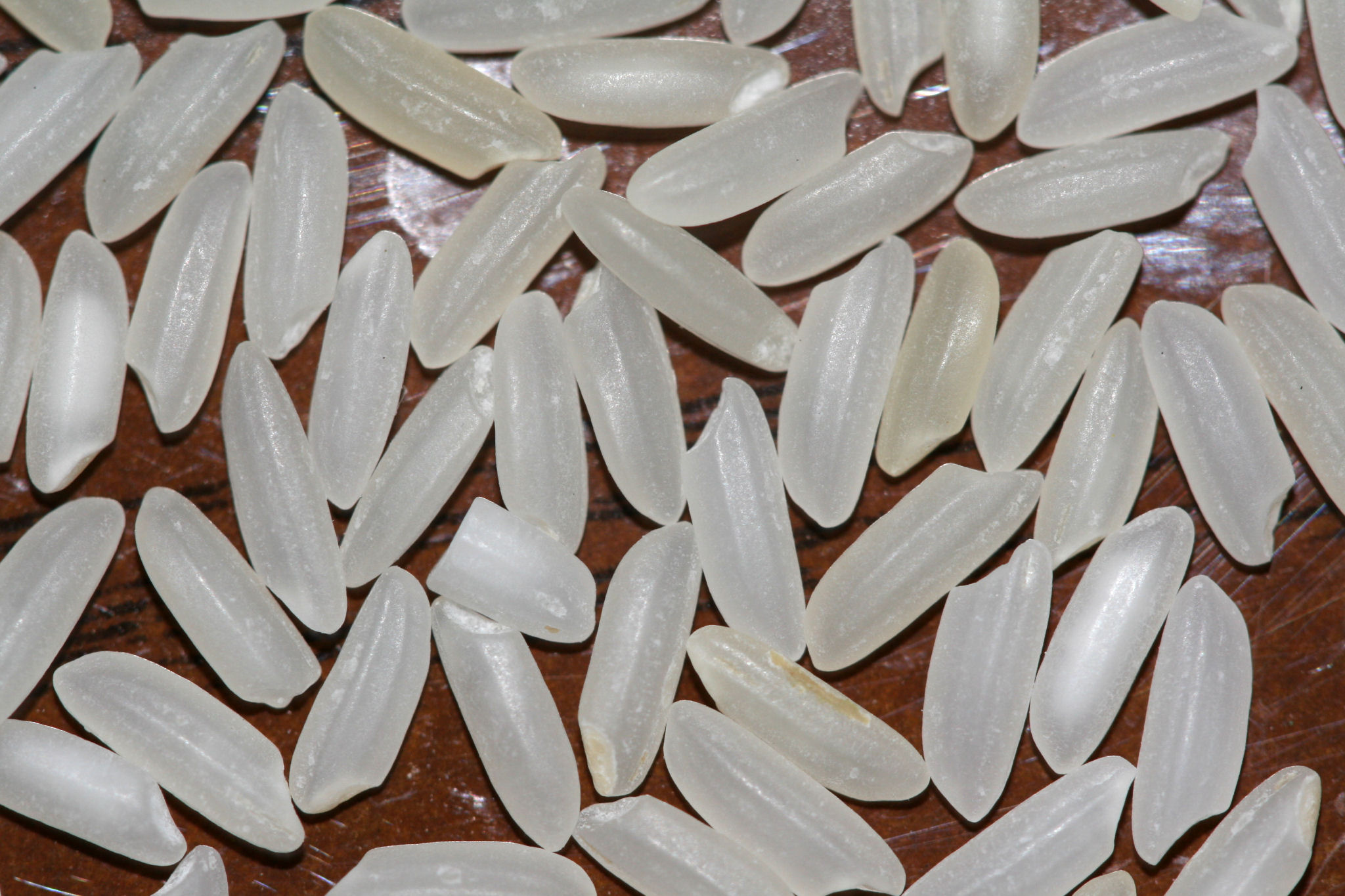
Polished sona masuri rice

Sona masuri (IET No. 7244, BPT 3291, also spelled sona masoori or sona mahsuri) is a lightweight and aromatic medium-grain rice, which is the result of a cross combination of the sona and masuri rice varieties. It is grown largely in the Indian states of Andhra Pradesh, Telangana, Karnataka and Tamil Nadu, and is used primarily in South Indian cuisine. In Telugu, it is nicknamed baṅgāru tīgalu (బంగారు తీగలు, lit. "golden hair"). Sona masuri is a premium variety of rice that is also exported to many countries.

== Characteristics ==
the Sona Masuri is a medium-duration rice variety with fine grains. It has a grop duration of 135-140 days with moderate resistance to blast

== Cultivation and usage ==
Cultivation
| Country | State | District |
|---|---|---|
| India | Andhra Pradesh | Krishna |
| India | Andhra Pradesh | NTR |
| India | Andhra Pradesh | Guntur |
| India | Andhra Pradesh | Prakasam |
| India | Andhra Pradesh | Palnadu |
| India | Andhra Pradesh | Bapatla |
| India | Andhra Pradesh | Kurnool |
| India | Andhra Pradesh | Nandyal |
| India | Andhra Pradesh | Nellore |
| India | Andhra Pradesh | Tirupati |
| India | Andhra Pradesh | East Godavari |
| India | Andhra Pradesh | West Godavari |
| India | Andhra Pradesh | Eluru |
| India | Andhra Pradesh | Dr B. R. Ambedkar Konaseema |
| India | Andhra Pradesh | Alluri Sitharama Raju |
| India | Telangana | Mahabubnagar |
| India | Telangana | Nalgonda |
| India | Telangana | Karimnagar |
| India | Telangana | Nizamabad |
| India | Telangana | Warangal |
| India | Telangana | Hanamkonda |
| India | Karnataka | Raichuru |
| India | Karnataka | Koppala |
| India | Karnataka | Ballari |
| India | Karnataka | Vijayanagara |
| India | Karnataka | Belagavi |
| India | Karnataka | Dharwada |
| India | Karnataka | Gadaga |
| India | Karnataka | Haveri |
| India | Karnataka | Davanagere |
| India | Tamil Nadu | Tiruchirappalli |
| India | Tamil Nadu | Thanjavur |
| India | Tamil Nadu | Thiruvarur |
| India | Tamil Nadu | Karur |
| India | Tamil Nadu | Namakkal |
| India | Tamil Nadu | Salem |
| India | Tamil Nadu | Erode |

=== Importers ===
- United States
- United Kingdom
- Canada
- Australia
- Singapore
- Malaysia
- Saudi Arabia
- United Arab Emirates
- Qatar
- Bahrain
- Oman
- European Union
