= Improved Samba Mahsuri =

Variety of rice

Improved Samba Mahsuri (RP Bio-226) is a high yielding fine grain rice variety developed in a collaborative project between scientists from the Council of Scientific & Industrial Research (CSIR)-Centre for Cellular and Molecular Biology (CCMB) and the Indian Council of Agricultural Research (ICAR)-Indian Institute of Rice Research (IIRR). The variety was developed using Marker assisted selection and has three major bacterial blight resistance genes (Xa21, Xa13 and Xa5). The All India Coordinated Rice Improved Project (AICRIP) conducted trials involving this variety of rice in multiple locations across India, and found positive results for resistance to bacterial blight.

== Pedigree ==
Samba Mahsuri*4/SS1113

== Recommended States ==
The grain has been recommended for use in the following states: Andhra Pradesh, Chhattisgarh, Orissa, Jharkhand, Bihar, Gujarat and Maharashtra.

== Features of Improved Samba Mahsuri ==
According to the Rice Knowledge Management Portal:

- Resistant to bacterial blight disease - "Significantly, under conditions of bacterial blight infestation, Improved Samba Mahsuri gives 15-30% more yield than any other bacterial blight susceptible variety."
- High yielding (4.75 to 5.0 tons/ha)
- "Fine grain variety possessing premium grain and cooking quality" - "Improved Samba Mahsuri also possesses excellent grain and cooking quality features on par with Samba Mahsuri in terms of hulling percentage (70%), Head rice recovery (65%), Kernel length (5.0 mm), Kernel breadth (1.8 mm), L/B ratio (2.7), Kernel length after cooking (8.7 mm), Elongation ratio (1.7), Alkali spreading value (4.5) and Amylose content (24.8)."
- Total Duration: 135–140 days

== Performance of Improved Samba Mahsuri across the states (Frontline Demonstrations) ==
During the 2009 Kharif season, in Andhra Pradesh, Frontline Demonstrations (FLDs) were conducted by the IIRR in collaboration with Andhra Pradesh Rice Research Institute (APRRI), Maruteru in two districts of Andhra Pradesh viz., West Godavari and Mahbubnagar.

In West Godavari, even though the yield advantage of Improved Samba Mahsuri was not significant enough, the cost of cultivation has gone down because of resistance to the Bacterial Leaf Blight (BLB). The BPT 5204 (Samba Mahsuri) is a popular variety grown in this region, but the variety is susceptible to BLB. Farmers were impressed by the new variety, so many of them started asking for the seed for the next season. To that extent, these demonstrations have helped generate awareness about the new variety.

Since BLB is a serious problem in this area, the variety developed by IIRR and CCMB, Hyderabad through Maker Assisted Backcross Breeding would be a boon to the farmers, not only in Andhra Pradesh but also for farmers in other states where BLB is a serious problem.

=== Performance in Gujarat ===
Rice is farmed in 14 districts of Gujarat. Rice productivity in Gujarat is quite low, at 1,356 kg/ha, compared to the national average of 1,947 kg/ha. More than 40% of rice land is concentrated in the very low productivity group, with about 40% concentrated in the medium-low production group. As a result, there is potential for increasing rice productivity in farmers' fields.

In 2010, 37 FLDs were organized in nine locations covering 150 farmers by Main Research Station, Navagam (Anand Agricultural University). Kharif being the dry and unfavorable season of the region, over all performance of demonstrated technologies could be considered as significant. The yield advantages of these varieties were in the range of 28% to 67%. Out of 37 FLDs, 2 FLDs were conducted on Improved Samba Mahsuri by the IIRR, in collaboration with the Main Research Station. In an area of 2.0 ha, it has recorded a yield advantage of 32% compared to the local check.
