= Camargue red rice =

Variety of red rice

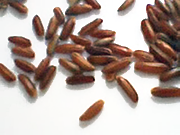
Grains of Camargue red rice

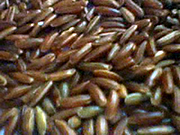
Camargue red rice

Camargue red rice (Occitan: ròc de ris roge de Camarga) is a variety of red rice cultivated in the wetlands of the Camargue region of southern France.

== History ==
Red rice had traditionally grown wild in the marshes of the Camargue.

Shortly after World War II vast swaths of salt marshes were desalinated. To boost the local economy, the previous production of salt was replaced by agriculture. Production of white rice was at its peak in the 1960s.

By the 1980s this white rice had cross-pollinated with red wild rice, giving birth to the current breed of Camargue red rice.

== Description ==
Once the husk is removed, the bran is a brownish-red colour. It has an intense somewhat nutty taste and a naturally chewy texture.

== Benefits ==
Red rice has several benefits, apart from being a weight loss friendly food; strengthens immunity; helps in controlling diabetes; prevention of asthma; improves digestion; reduces hunger pangs and the risk of cardiovascular diseases and prevention of arthritis and osteoporosis.
