= Zailai rice =

Rice cultivar

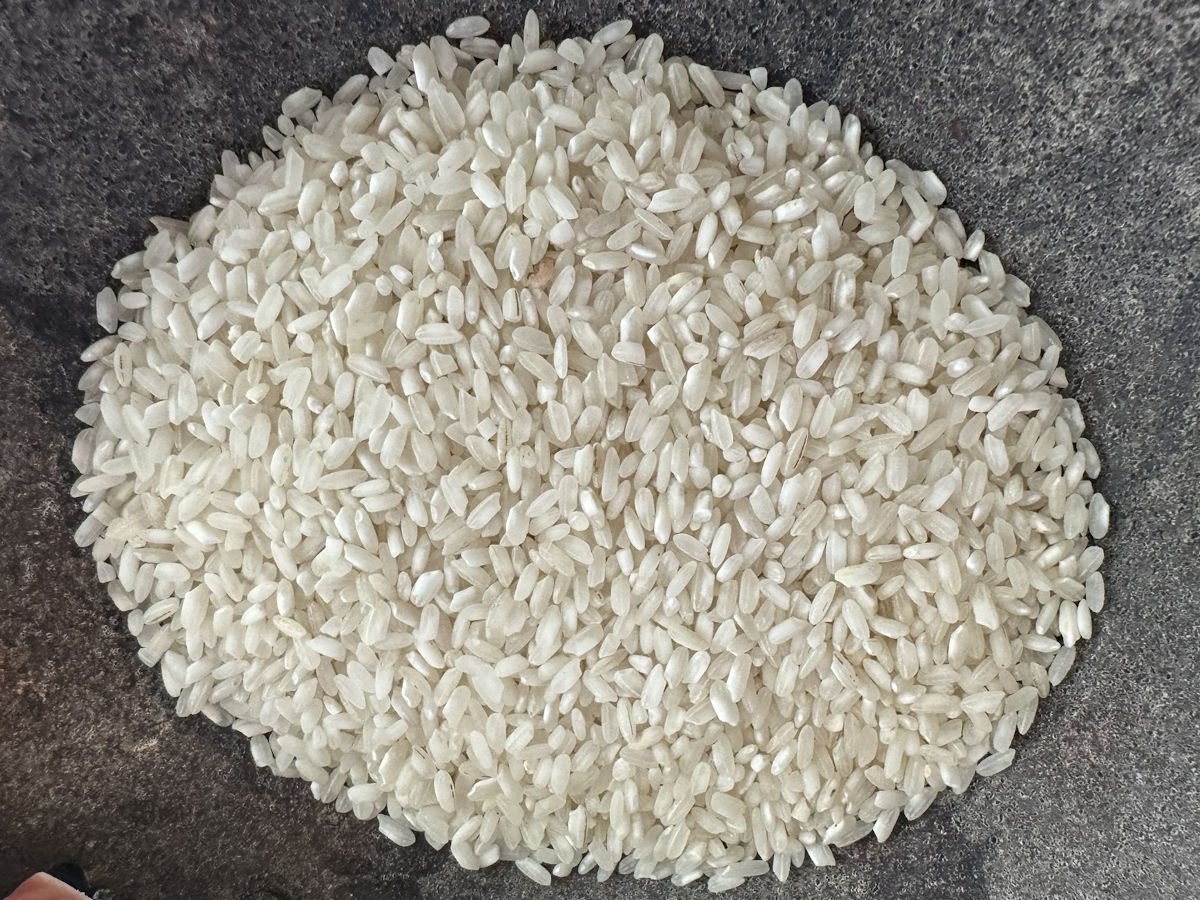
- Species: Oryza sativa
- Cultivar: Zailai

Zailai rice (Chinese: 在來米, romanized: tsāi-lâi-bí) is a cultivar of rice derived from the subspecies Oryza sativa subsp. indica, or indica rice, traditionally grown in Taiwan. It is one of three major types of rice planted and consumed in Taiwan, the other two being penglai rice and glutinous rice. The name "zailai" is derived from the Japanese "ざいらい" meaning "existing", to distinguish it from the penglai rice hybrids developed by the colonizers when Taiwan was under Japanese colonial rule. Zailai rice cultivars can be sub-divided into soft (e.g. "Taichung Sen No. 10") and hard (e.g. "Taichung Sen No. 17") indica rice varieties.

Zailai rice cultivation in Taiwan began in the 17th century before the Dutch Formosa period, when immigrants introduced indica rice and water buffalo to the island; the Hokkien immigrants from the Fujian area in China also imported different strains of indica rice. Subsequently, zailai rice was planted around the island by military settlements of the Kingdom of Tungning.

Zailai rice is a long-grained variety that contains less than 80% of amylopectin, making it less sticky than penglai rice and glutinous rice, suitable for making rice vermicelli, turnip cake, silver needle noodles, he fen, 碗粿, etc.
