= Red Cargo rice =

Variety of rice

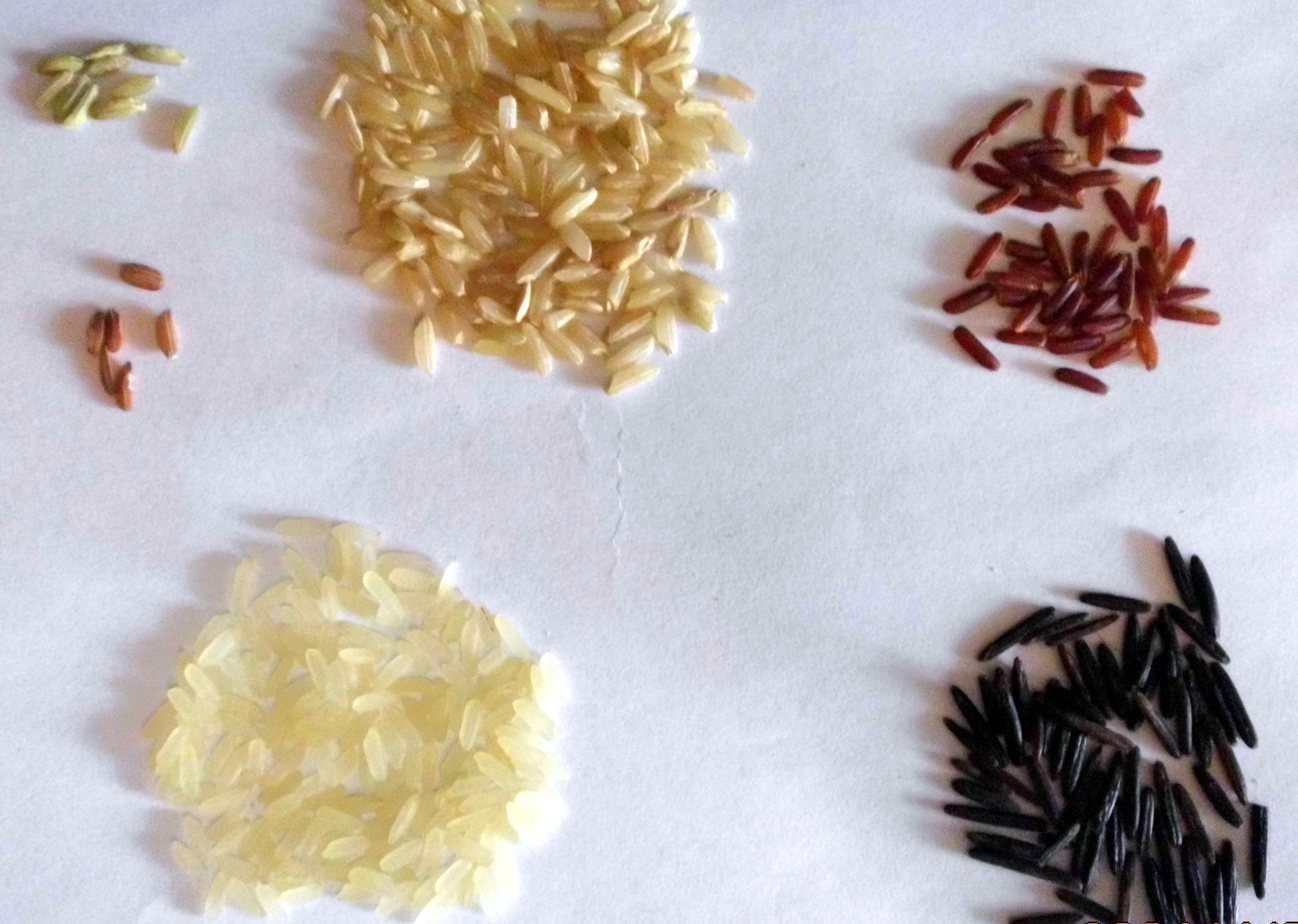
Top Right

Red Cargo rice is a type of non-glutinous long grain rice that is similar to brown rice, in that it is unpolished. The color of the bran is red, purple, or maroon. The husks of the rice grains are removed during the milling process, retaining all the nutrients, vitamins, and minerals intact in the bran layer and in the germ.

== Health and nutritional benefits ==
Red rice is a good source of thiamin (vitamin B_{1}), riboflavin (vitamin B_{2}), fibre, iron and calcium. The flavor of cooked red cargo rice is generally more sweet and nutty, and the texture is more chewy than standard white polished rice. Red rice takes longer to cook than white rice, but not as long as brown rice. Soaking the rice in water for at least 30 minutes before cooking produces a softer texture.

== History ==
The term "cargo" originates from the idea that this type of rice is exported/transported by ship/sea in bulk to the importers/distributors who then package the rice in small 1 kg bags for the market, unlike white rice which is usually pre-packed by exporters into 5, 10 or 25 kg bags.
