= Mokwan =

Mokwan may refer to:

- Mokwan, the way the Dorobo peoples refer to Sirikwa culture.
- Mokwan, as jããnkun (marshallese dried pandanus paste) is called in the northern atolls of the Marshall Islands.
