= Sasanishiki =

Japanese rice

Suitou Nourin No.150 (Touhoku No.78)
- Species: Oryza sativa
- Hybrid parentage: 'Sasashigure' × 'Hatsunishiki'
- Subspecies: O. s. subsp. japonica
- Cultivar group: Temperate japonica
- Marketing names: Sasanishiki
- Origin: Furukawa, Miyagi, Japan 1963

Sasanishiki is a Japanese rice variety from Sendai, Japan.

Sasanishiki was created as a mixture of Hatsunishiki and Sasashigure at Furukawa Agricultural Experiment Station in Miyagi Prefecture in Japan in 1963. The unique feature of this particular kind of Japanese rice is its ability to keep the same taste even when cooling down. This makes it good for sushi, and some sushi restaurants in Japan advertise the use of this rice.

== See also ==
- Japanese rice
