= Japanese rice =

Strains of Japonica rice

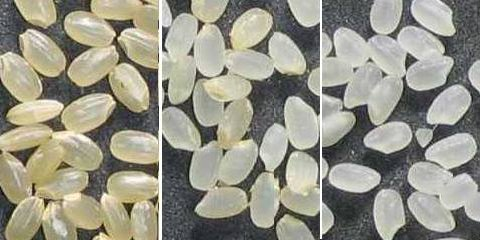
From left: brown rice, half-milled rice, white rice

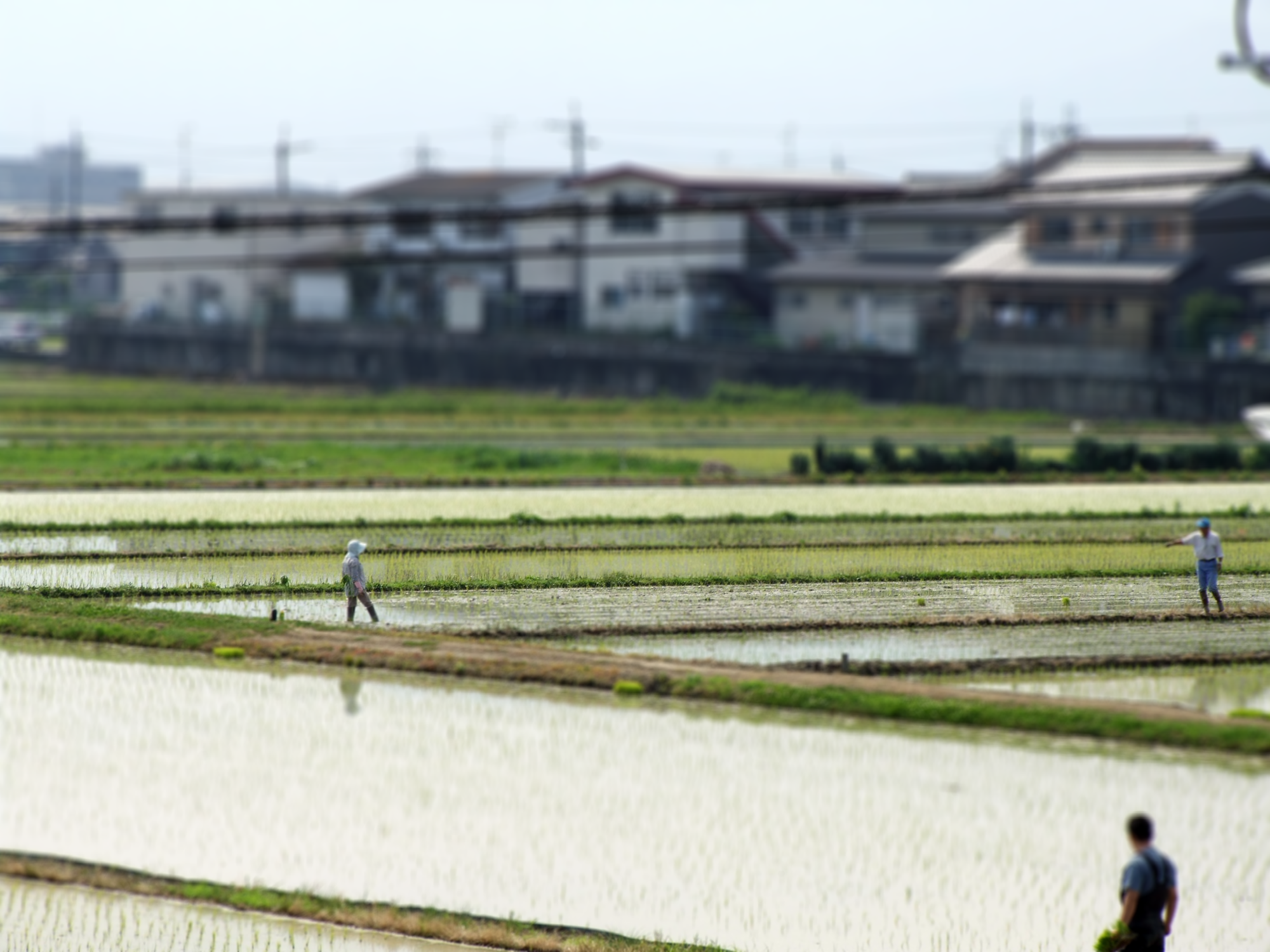
A Japanese rice field in Nara

Japanese rice refers to a number of short-grain cultivars of Japonica rice including ordinary rice (uruchimai) and glutinous rice (mochigome).

Ordinary Japanese rice, or uruchimai (粳米), is the staple of the Japanese diet and consists of short translucent grains. When cooked, it has a sticky texture such that it can easily be picked up and eaten with chopsticks. Outside Japan, it is sometimes labeled sushi rice, as this is one of its common uses. It is also used to produce sake.

Glutinous rice, known in Japan as mochigome (もち米), is used for making mochi (餅), Okowa, and special dishes such as sekihan. It is a short-grain rice, and it can be distinguished from uruchimai by its particularly short, round, opaque grains, its greater stickiness when cooked, and firmer and chewier texture.

== Cultivation ==
Contemporary cultivation of rice in Japan is characterized by high mechanization, intense cultivation, and a shortage of farmland. Terraced rice fields cover many rural hillsides and are relatively small due to mountainous terrain and government controls on farmland consolidation.

== Cultivars ==
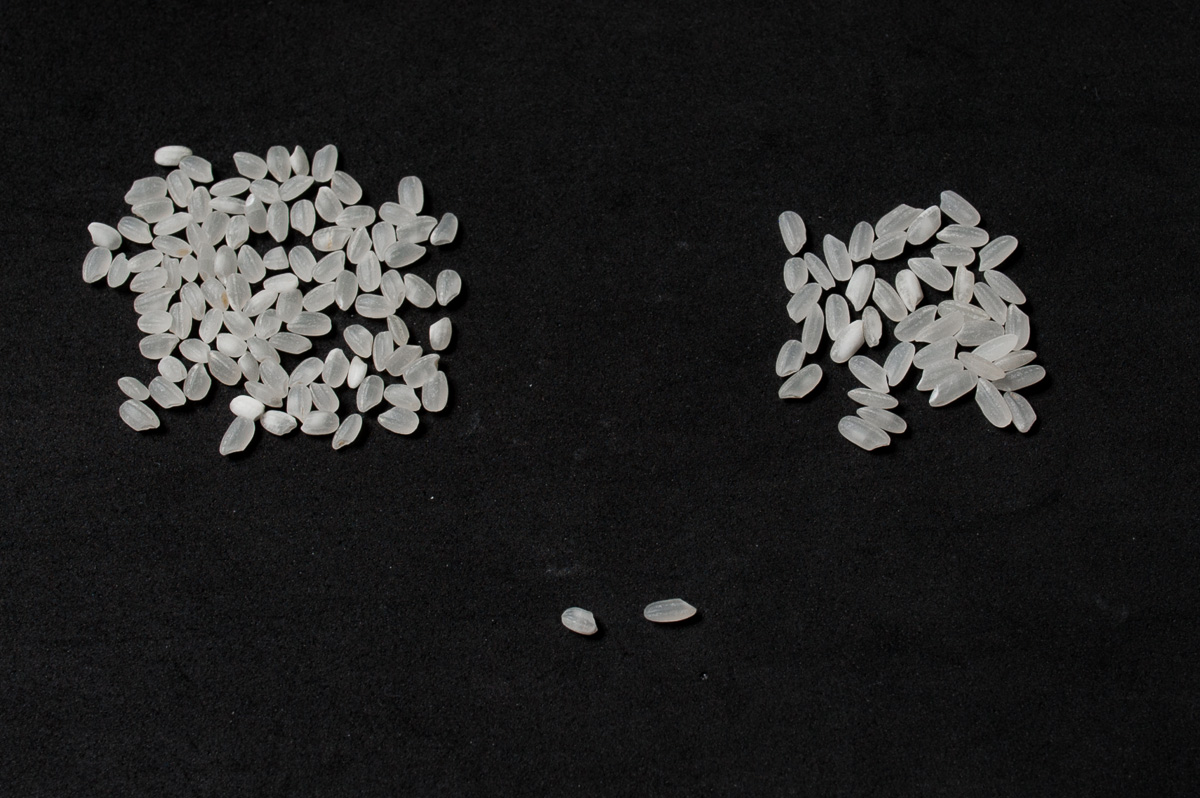
A comparison between Koshihikari and Calrose cultivars. Koshihikari on the left, Calrose on the right.

Koshihikari (こしひかり) is a particularly esteemed cultivar and one of the most commonly grown in Japan. Akitakomachi is also quite popular. Sasanishiki is a cultivar known for keeping the same taste when cooled down. Yamada Nishiki is the most famous cultivar grown specifically for sake.

In Hokkaidō, Japan's northernmost prefecture, hardier cultivars such as Oborozuki and Yumepirika have been developed to withstand the colder climate.

Calrose is the name used originally for a medium-grain Japonica cultivar developed in 1948, and now as a generic term for California medium grain Japonicas. While not true Japanese rice, Calrose-type rice has been grown by Japanese American producers in California for many years. It is commonly used to prepare Japanese cuisine in North America, and is reasonably good as a sushi rice. It is also exported to a number of countries including Japan, although it has not gained much popularity with Japanese consumers. In recent years, Koshihikari rice is also being grown in the US and Australia.

== Processing ==
Rice begins as brown rice (玄米; genmai) which may then be polished by a machine (精米機 seimaiki), in which case it is sold as ready-polished or white rice, hakumai (白米). Most rice in Japan is processed and consumed as white rice, the staple food of Japan. Brown rice is also consumed in its unpolished state, often for its health benefits, but it is considered a specialty.

Germinated brown rice (発芽玄米, Hatsuga genmai) is brown rice that has been soaked in heated water until germinated. It is also known as GABA rice, as the germination process greatly increases its GABA content. It has a softer texture than ordinary brown rice and a pleasant fragrance. It is sold in Japanese supermarkets, but it can also be made at home. Some high-end rice cookers have a GABA rice setting to automate the process.

Haigamai is rice that has been partially milled to remove most of the bran but leave the germ intact. It takes less time to cook than brown rice but retains more of the vitamins than white rice.

Coin-operated automated rice polishing machines, called seimaijo (精米所), for polishing brown rice, are a common sight in rural Japan. The rice polishing machines typically polish a 10 kg (22 lb) amount for 100 yen. The by-product of the polishing process, rice bran (米ぬか; komenuka) is used commercially as the source of rice bran oil. It may also be used for making a kind of pickle called nukazuke (ぬかづけ), as an organic fertilizer, and in livestock feed.

Most supermarkets in Japan sell ready-polished rice in 10 kg (22 lb), 5 kg (11 lb), and smaller bags. Brown rice is usually sold in 30 kg (66 lb) bags, which may be generally polished by the consumer in a coin-operated polishing machine, or in smaller bags in supermarkets intended for eating as brown rice.

Musenmai (無洗米; 'no-wash rice' or 'pre-washed' rice) is white rice which has been further processed to remove a sticky coating called the hada nuka (肌糠), or skin bran, which is normally removed by rinsing the rice prior to cooking for better taste and aroma. The manufacturing process involves tumbling the rice in a tube for a short duration, causing the bran to stick to the sides of the tube. The process notably does not use water, which is significant because water from rinsing rice is a big contributor of water pollution in Japan.

== Uses ==
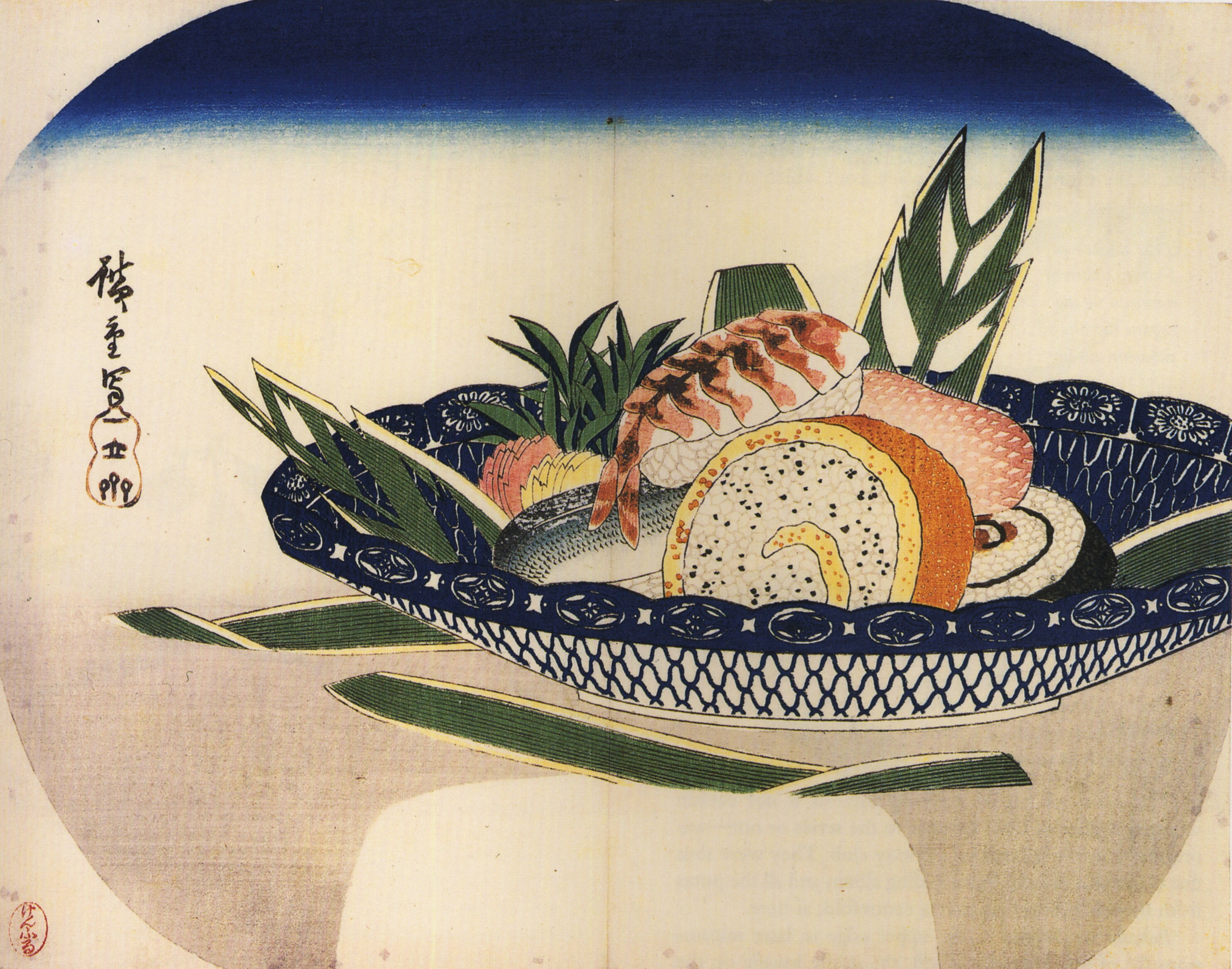
Sushi by Hiroshige in Edo period

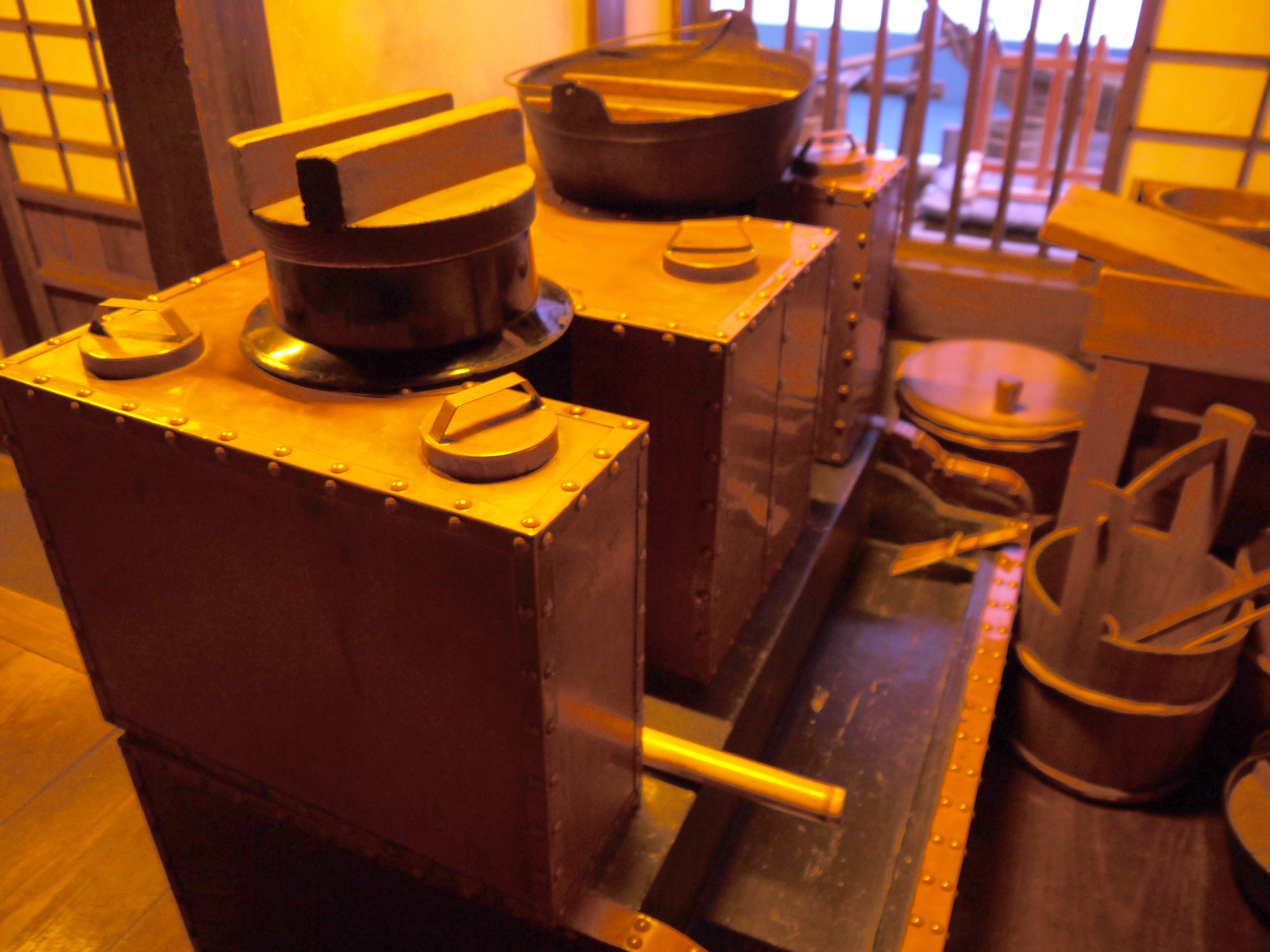
Rice cooker of the Edo period Fukagawa Edo Museum

Ordinary rice (uruchimai) is eaten in several ways in Japan, most commonly as plain rice (ご飯; gohan, lit. 'cooked rice' or 'meal of any sort') consumed as part of a typical washoku (和食) meal accompanied by several okazu (おかず) dishes, tsukemono (漬物; 'pickled things'), and miso soup. In bento boxes, it is often served with a topping of furikake, a single umeboshi, or a sheet of nori. It is used in sushi and onigiri.

Examples of simple breakfast dishes include plain rice mixed with raw egg and optional soy sauce, known as tamago kake gohan, and plain rice with nattō. Plain rice is used in yōshoku dishes such as curry rice, omurice, and doria. Leftover plain rice is often reused for ochazuke (茶漬け; rice with green tea) or chāhan (チャーハン; fried rice).

Takikomi gohan is made with ordinary rice which is cooked together with vegetables, meat, or fish seasoned with dashi and soy sauce.

Uruchimai is also used to make alcoholic drinks like sake, and sometimes shochu, as an adjunct in Japanese beer, and to make rice vinegar.

Uncooked brown rice grains are mixed with green tea leaves and used to brew a kind of tea called genmaicha (玄米茶; brown rice tea).

Glutinous rice, known in Japan as mochigome, is used for making mochi, the festive red bean and rice dish sekihan, as well as traditional snacks such as senbei (煎餅), arare (あられ), and agemochi (揚げ餅).

=== Preparation ===
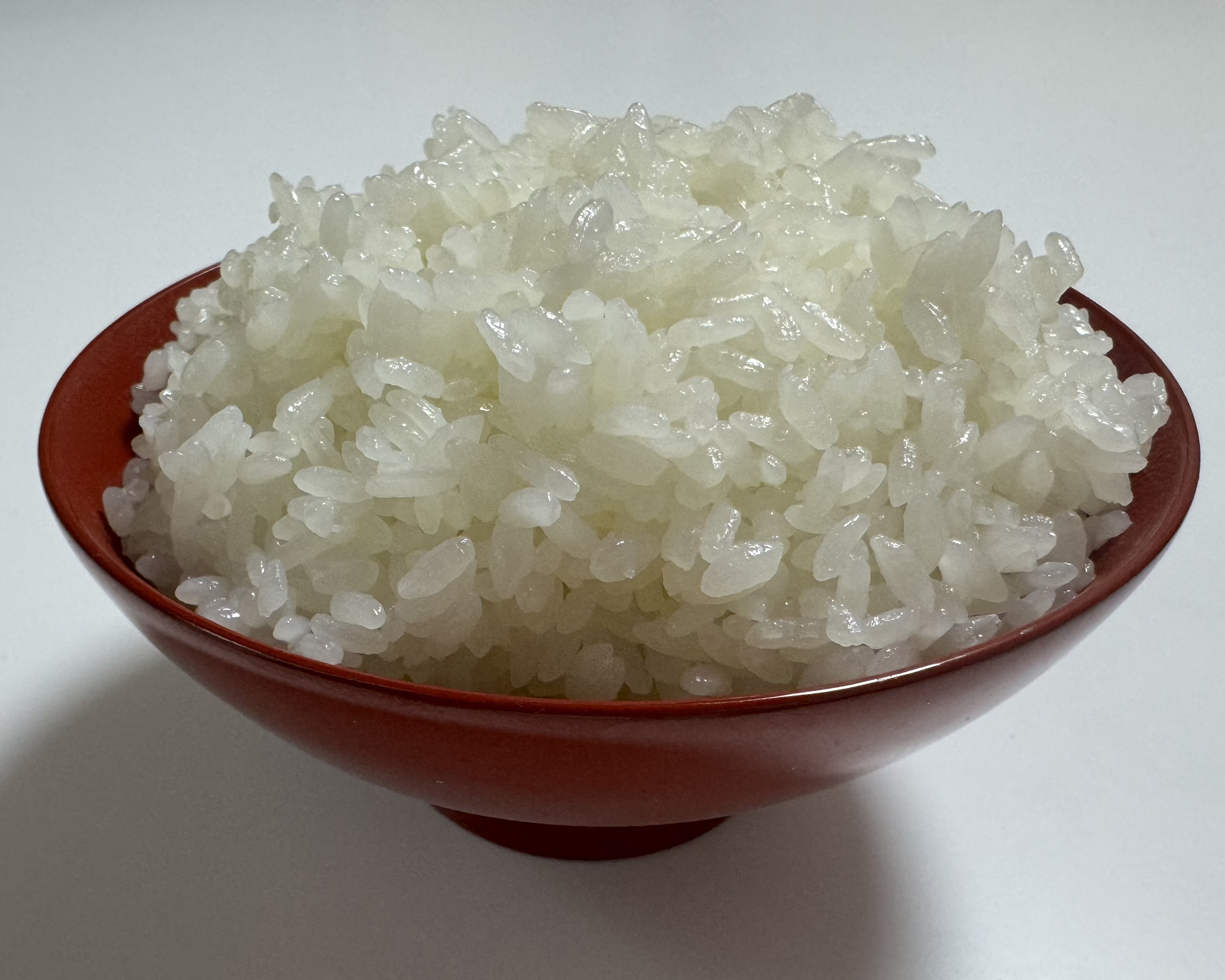
Cooked Japanese rice served in Wajima-nuri lacquerware

Most Japanese use suihanki (rice cookers) to which measured amounts of washed rice and water are added. The rice is first washed to release excess starch. Then, before cooking it is usually soaked in water for between half an hour in summer, and two hours in winter. Soaking times also depend on the quality and freshness of the rice. The rice is then boiled using a ratio of about five parts of water to four parts of rice – though with fresher rice, the ratio can go down to 1-to-1. After this, it is steamed until the centre of the rice becomes soft. Salt is not added to the rice.

Most modern rice cookers include a cooking-delay timer, so that rice placed in the cooker at night will be ready for the morning meal. The rice cooker can also keep rice moist and warm, allowing it to remain edible for several hours after cooking.

Prepared rice is usually served from the rice cooker into a chawan, or rice bowl.

After cooking, rice may also be held in a covered wooden box called an ohitsu.

== Trading ==
The Dojima Rice Market in Osaka was the first known futures market, with trading in rice contracts established c. 1730. This market ceased with economic controls in 1939. In 2005, the Tokyo Grain Exchange announced that it would create a futures contract on rice with trading starting in the summer of 2006. However, the trading of these futures contracts has been postponed to an unspecified date since it has not been approved by the Japanese government.

The Tokyo Grain Exchange was founded in 1952 in the same location as the Kakigaracho Rice Trading Exchange, established in 1874. As of 2005, two varieties of Japanese rice were in consideration for standardization of the contract.

In order to fulfill self-sufficiency goals in Japan and to support domestic rice producers, the Japanese government enforces quotas and high tariffs on foreign rice. As a result, most rice consumed in Japan is domestically produced. However, price increases in recent years have led a small but increasing number of Japanese consumers and restaurants to seek out less expensive rice imported from China, Australia, and the US.

== See also ==
- Nori
- Onigiri
- Paddy field
- Sushi
