= Chukuchuk =

Dish from cuisine of the Marshall Islands

- Type: Biscuit
- Place of origin: Marshall Islands
- Main ingredients: rice, coconut

Chukuchuk is a dish from cuisine of the Marshall Islands. It is a ball shaped made of calrose rice and shredded coconut flesh. The size is similar to a golf ball.

It is very popular on the Marshall Islands because it is simple to make. It is served on special occasions or as a side dish with grilled meat, fish or fruit.
