= Marshallese cuisine =

Culinary traditions of the Marshall Islands

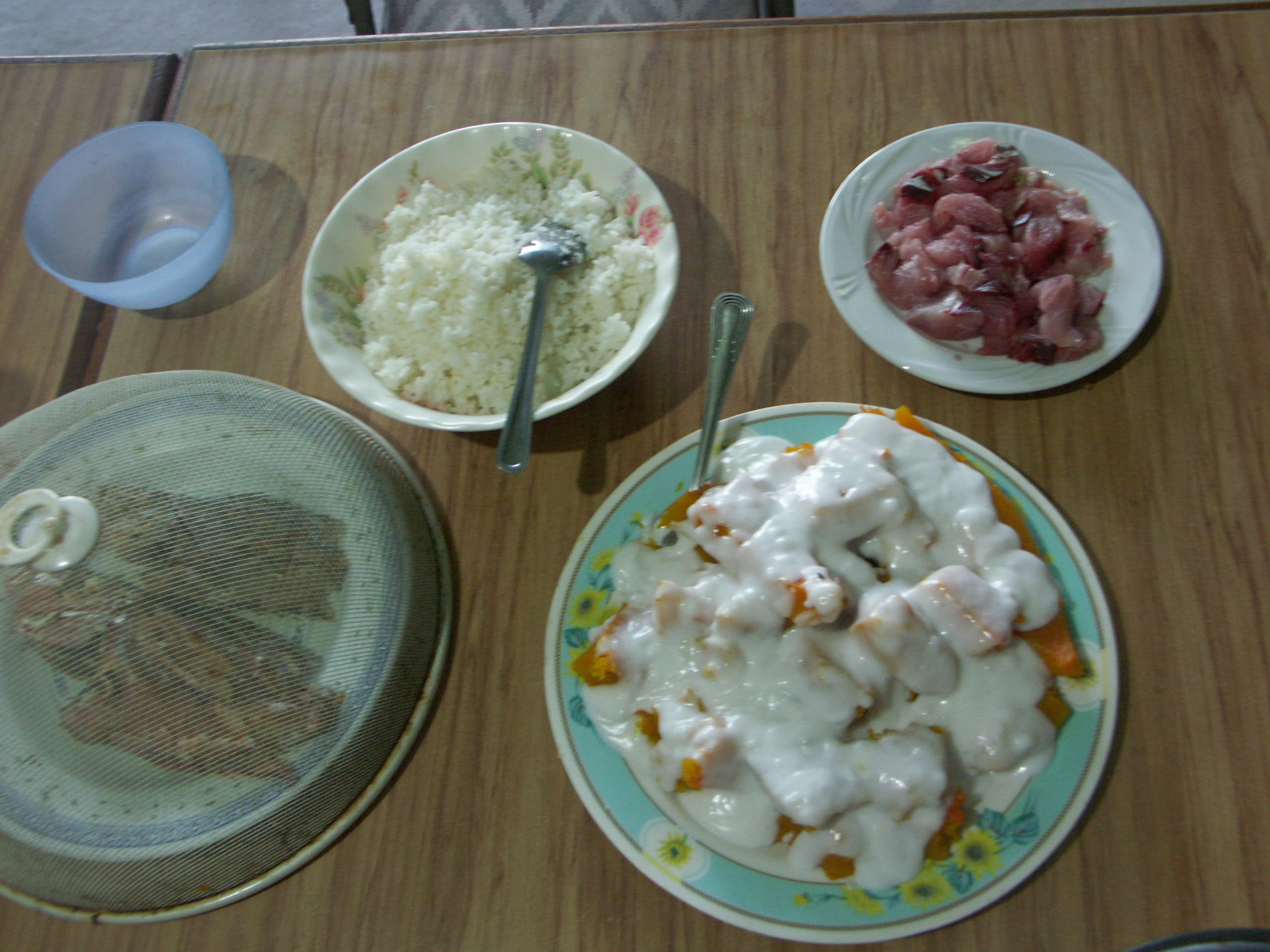
- Various Marshallese dishes
- Country or region: Marshall Islands
- National dishes: Barramundi cod, macadamia nut pie
- National drink: Coconut water

Marshallese cuisine comprises the fare, foods, beverages and foodways of the Marshall Islands, including its food-related customs and traditions. Common indigenous and traditional foods include breadfruit, coconut, bananas, papaya, seafood, pandanus and bwiro (fermented breadfruit and coconut milk). Additional imported foods, such as rice and flour, are also a part of people's diets and contribute to the cuisine as well. The practice of food preservation is a part of the history of the islands, and continues to occur today.

== Common foods and dishes ==
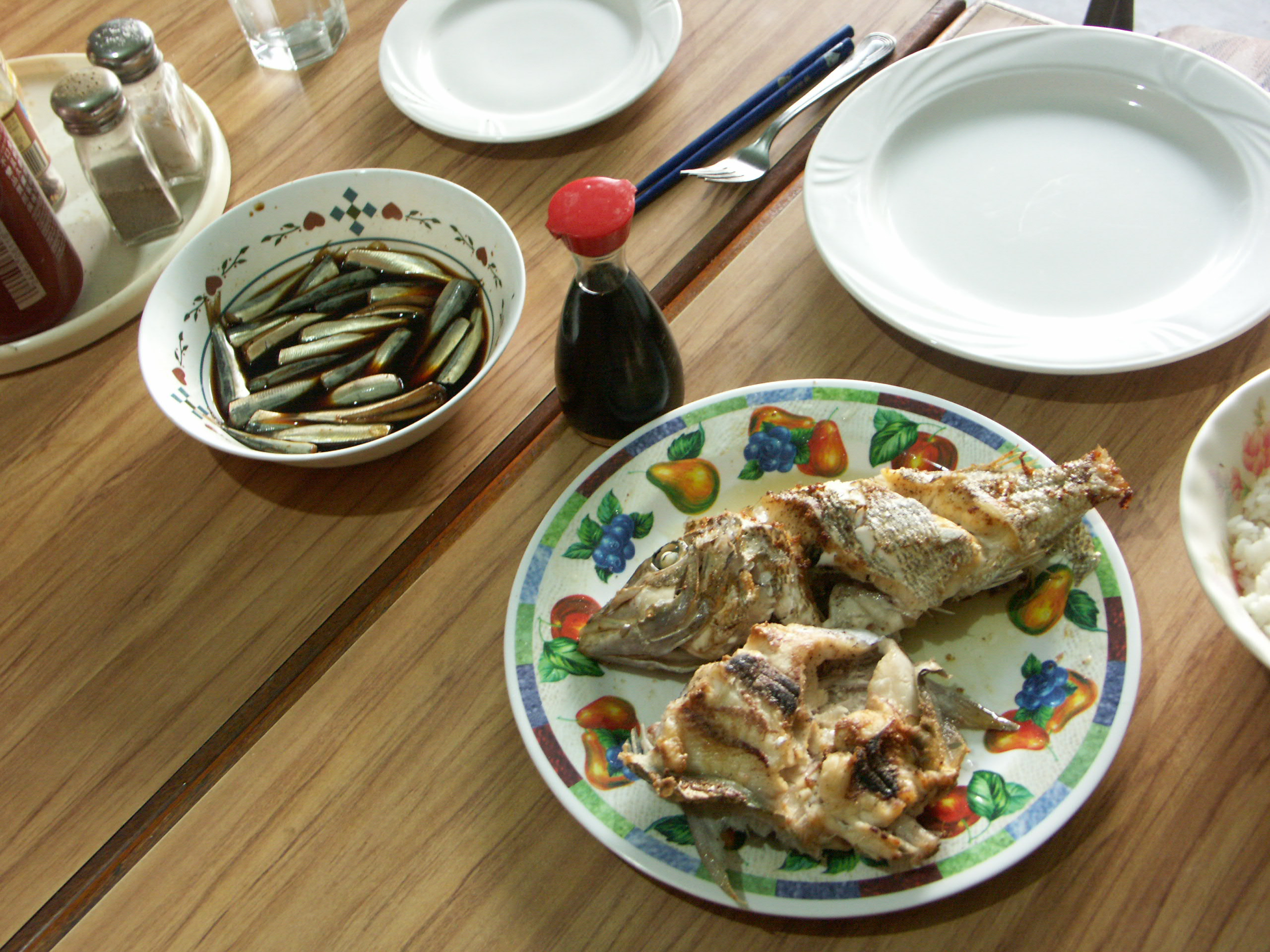
Fish at the Marshall Islands

Foods and dishes consumed on the Marshall islands includes breadfruit, bananas, coconut, papaya, rice and rice dishes such as sticky rice balls, seafood, fish and fried fish, coconut crab, chicken, pork, clams, sashimi, sea turtles and coconut water. Breadfruit is a staple food, (Note: "Breadfruit, long a standard starchy staple of Marshallese cuisine, was discovered to be the most important and socially shared traditional Marshallese food.") as is fish, with an average Marshallese fish consumption amount consisting of 240 pounds annually. Fishing is a common activity on the islands, and there are 50 various phrases and words in the Marshallese language devoted to fishing techniques alone. Several foods, such as rice, flour, sugar and tea, are imported into the islands, and are sometimes used to supplement foods that are indigenous to the islands.

== Traditional foods, dishes and customs ==
Foods play a significant role in celebrations and special events on the islands. In Marshallese culture, it is a custom for foods to be provided to the Iroij, chiefs in the Marshall Islands, as a form of recognition and respect.

Some traditional foods and dishes include pandanus, breadfruit, including bwiro, a breadfruit dish consisting of breadfruit paste that is fermented, wrapped in banana leaves and cooked in an underground oven, roasted breadfruit and mashed taro root. Copra, the dried meat or kernel of the coconut, is a significant export of the Marshall islands, and is used to make oil by pressing.

In Marshallese culture, a kemem is a celebration party that commences upon a child's first birthday. At kemems it is traditional for a plethora of Marshallese and other various foods and dishes to be served, and along with food consumption, guests are typically encouraged to take some sort of household item from the home of the party. In Marshallese culture, a family's generosity is sometimes considered as relative to the family having a lessened amount of material items left after the kemen is over.

== Food preservation ==
Food preservation has been an historic part of Marshallese culture and food security on the islands, and continues to be practiced today, although not as much as in the past. A dried pandanus paste continues to be produced by people on the northern atoll Ratak Chain islands of Ailuk, Likiep and Mejit, where it is referred to as mokwan, and also by people on the Ralik Chain islands of Ujae, Lae and Wotho, who refer to the paste as jããnkun. When properly prepared, the pandanus paste is storable and remains edible for years. Bwiro, the fermented and cooked breadfruit dish, can be preserved "for many months without spoiling".

== See also ==
- Chukuchuk – a Marshallese rice and coconut dish
- Marshallese culture
- Oceanic cuisine

== Bibliography ==
- Chen, Diana Kay (2018). Got Breadfruit? Marshallese Foodways and Culture in Springdale, Arkansas. University of Arkansas, Fayetteville.. 604 pages. – "Springdale is home to the highest population of Marshallese people outside of the Republic of the Marshall Islands (RMI); the population is expected to rise as people continue to migrate from the RMI because of global climate change and other factors such as family ties." - Profile at University of Arkansas Profile at Google Books - The source discusses food culture of the Marshallese people in Springdale, Arkansas
