= Sun Valley Rice =

American company

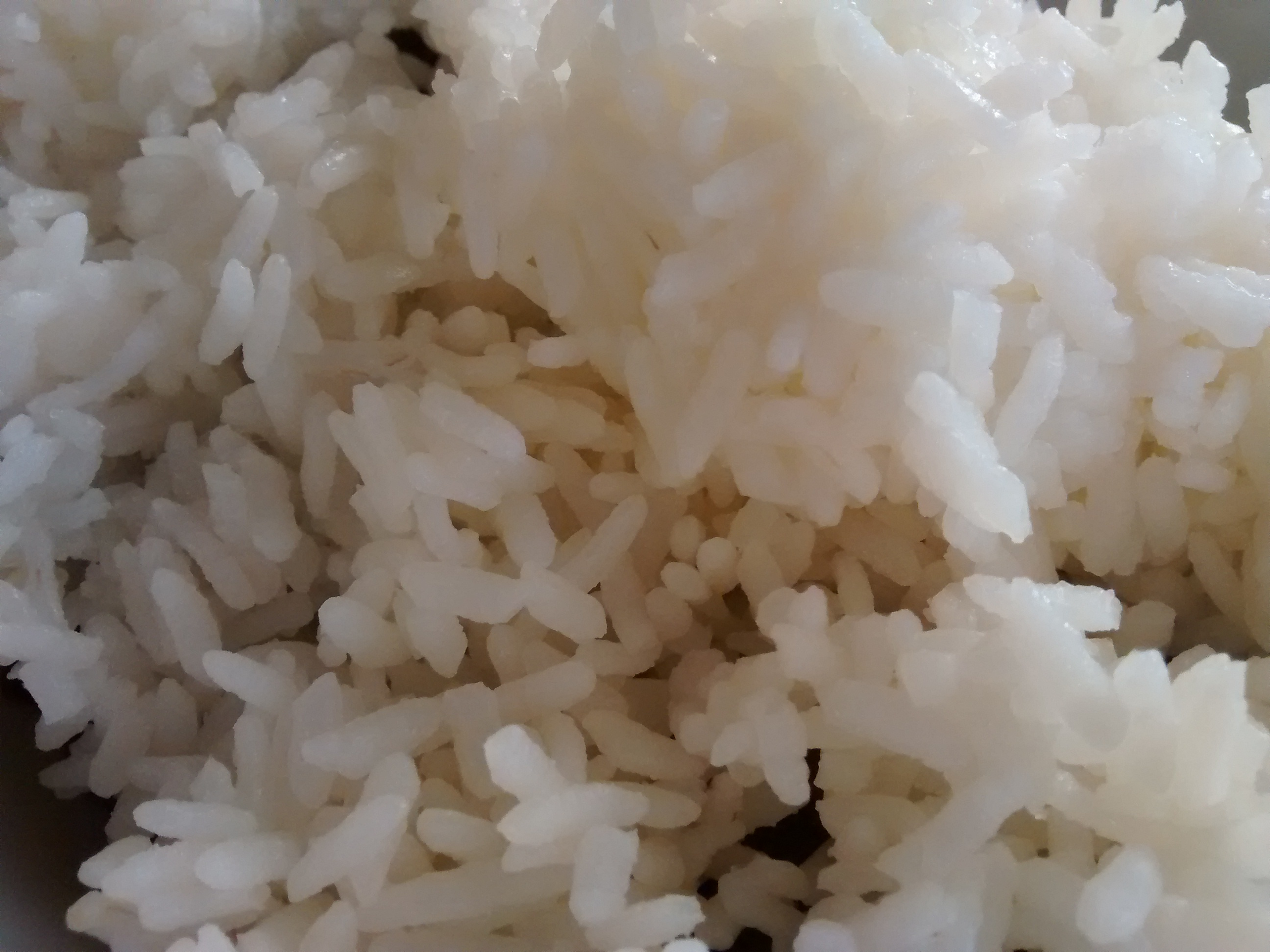
Calrose rice

Sun Valley Rice, founded in 2000, produces medium-grain calrose rice. In 2019, it became the first US company to export rice to China. Founded by father and son Michael and Ken LaGrande, the company is based in Sacramento, California.

The company sells its rice to other countries around the world, in addition to its new contract with China. Sun Valley Rice is a member of the LaGrande Family Foods Group, a family owned company which has been involved in agriculture in the Sacramento Valley for almost 100 years. The area is one of the few in the world where both short and medium-grain rice can grow.

The company was chosen to be the first to sell rice to China after a Chinese law prohibiting the sale of American rice in China was lifted in 2018 because of its familiarity with Asian cultures, especially Chinese and Japanese.
