= Koshihikari =

Cultivar of japonica rice

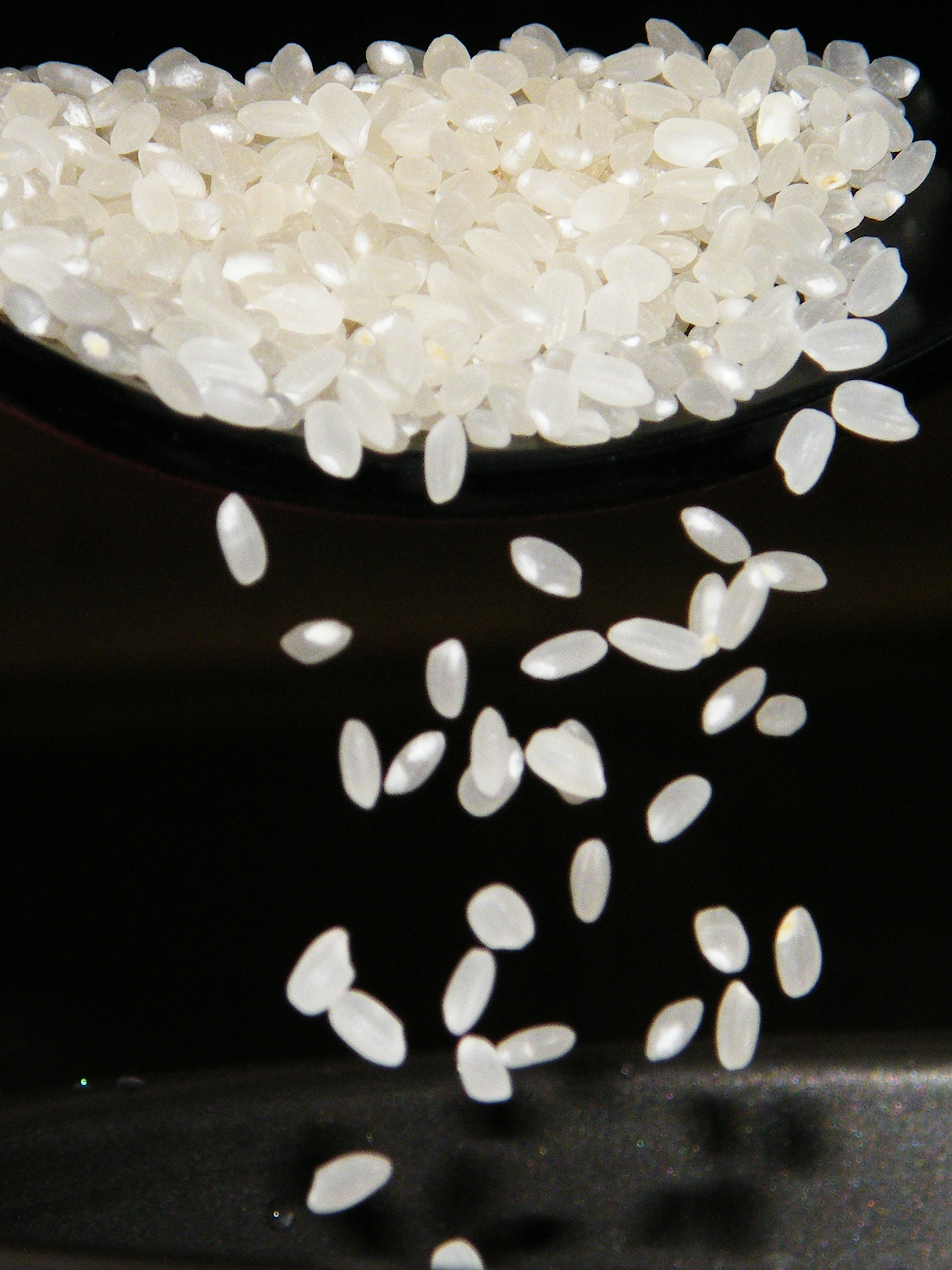
- Hybrid parentage: 'Nourin No.1' × 'Nourin No.22'
- Subspecies: O. s. subsp. japonica
- Cultivar group: temperate japonica
- Cultivar: Nourin No.100 (Etsunan No.17)
- Marketing names: Koshihikari
- Origin: Japan, 1956

Koshihikari (Japanese: コシヒカリ, 越光, Hepburn: Koshihikari) is a popular cultivar of Japonica rice cultivated in Japan as well as Australia, Italy, and the United States.

Koshihikari was first created in 1956 by combining 2 different strains of Nourin No.1 and Nourin No.22 at the Fukui Prefectural Agricultural Research Facility. It is one of the most highly grown varieties of rice in Japan and is exported to other countries as a premium product.

As of 2008, Koshihikari BL accounted for 97% of Koshihikari production in Niigata Prefecture, the largest rice-growing region in Japan.

Koshihikari has also been cultivated in bayous of Arkansas by Isbell Farms. It is one of the earliest locations outside Japan for the rice to be cultivated.

== Etymology ==
The character for koshi (越) is used to represent the old Koshi Province, which stretched from present-day Fukui to Yamagata. Koshihikari can be translated as "the light of Koshi".

== Koshihikari BL (Blast resistance Lines) ==
Niigata Prefecture has developed a series of Koshihikari varieties with blast disease resistance genes introduced through backcrossing, and by crossing these varieties, the Koshihikari BL group was created with dramatically improved resistance to blast disease. Compared with the original Koshihikari, Koshihikari BL reduces the incidence of rice blast to one-tenth and the use of agricultural chemicals by 25%.

Niigata Prefecture began developing a group of varieties that improved Koshihikari for rice blast resistance in 1986, and registered Koshihikari Niigata BL No. 1 to No. 3 in 2000 and Koshihikari Niigata BL No. 4 in 2002, with production starting in 2005. Under the Plant Variety Protection and Seed Act (ja), these varieties and seed names are registered as Koshihikari Niigata BL, but as milled product names they are marketed simply as Koshihikari.

As of 2023, Niigata Prefecture has registered Koshihikari Niigata BL Nos. 1 to 6 and 9 to 13 under the Plant Variety Protection and Seed Act, with BL Nos. 4 and 13 each accounting for 35% of production, BL No. 2 accounting for 20%, and BL No. 1 accounting for 10%.

== Related varieties ==
Other rice varieties close to its strains, such as Akitakomachi (ja), Hitomebore (ja), and Hinohikari (ja) were subsequently created by cross-breeding Koshihikari with other Japanese varieties of rice.

== See also ==
- Japanese rice
