= Marshallese people in Springdale, Arkansas =

Overview of the Marshallese population in Springdale, Arkansas

There is a population of Marshallese people in Northwest Arkansas, concentrated in Springdale.

Marshallese citizens are eligible to stay in Arkansas due to the Compact of Free Association. Photographer Lawrence Sumulong stated that this is the largest concentration of ethnic Marshallese in the United States.

The community has the nickname "Springdale atoll".

== History ==
A "push factor" from the Marshall Islands was nuclear testing at Bikini Atoll.

In the 1970s a Marshallese man named John Moody attended a university in the state of Oklahoma and then in the 1980s got employment at a Tyson Chicken factory in the area. Other Marshallese followed him after he told them there was ample employment in the area. By the 1990s the area became known as the "Springdale atoll", and a plaque honoring Moody was installed in 1999.

By 2010 there were about 6,000 people in the Northwest Arkansas region who were of Marshallese ancestry, heavily concentrated in Springdale and beginning to settle other cities. A census taken in 2020 indicated that there were approximately 15,000 people of Marshallese origin living in the entire state of Arkansas, with a majority of them concentrated in the northwest region of the state. Those of Marshallese ancestry were about 3% of the total number of people living in Northwest Arkansas in 2020.

As of December 2020, the Marshallese population had higher than average deaths during the COVID-19 pandemic in Arkansas. As of June 2020, half of the people in Northwest Arkansas who died from COVID were of Marshallese ancestry.

In 2021 there was a movement to have the state laws allow Marshallese citizens to be eligible to begin working as law enforcement officers. A previous proposal in the Arkansas Legislature by Megan Godfrey of Springdale, House Bill 1342, was to allow any person of a citizen of a Compact of Free Association country (which includes the Marshall Islands) to be eligible to join a police department. That year the bill failed in committee. Members of the Arkansas Legislature stated they had plans to try a bill again. That year the Arkansas Department of Public Safety stated that the agency could unilaterally change its rules and begin allowing Marshallese citizens to become police officers.

== Education ==
Circa 2014, the Springdale School District had about 2,000 Marshallese students. Circa 2009 this figure was 300 total. In 2012, 30% of the student body of Parson Hills Elementary School consisted of Marshallese students. The school enacted a cultural education program and donated alarm clocks to Marshallese families to combat truancy issues among Marshallese.

== Economy ==
As of 2018 there are Marshallese grocery stores and fundraising events selling prepared items of Marshallese cuisine. Marshallese people also import food items from the Marshall Islands into Arkansas for personal use. At that time no dedicated restaurants serving such cuisine were in Springdale.

== Government ==
By 2010 the Springdale Police Department got its first officer fluent in Marshallese.

The Marshallese government maintains a consulate general in Springdale. It is the only Marshallese consulate in the Mainland United States. In 2017 Eldon Alik became consul general.

== Healthcare ==
Marshallese children began to have eligibility for the ArKids First health care coverage due to work by Jeff Williams, a member of the Arkansas House of Representatives. In 2020 there were plans to put Marshallese citizens back on Medicaid. Asa Hutchinson, Governor of Arkansas, supported this move.

In 2016, within the State of Arkansas, 21.4% of the ethnic Marshallese people had pre-diabetes and 46.5% of the adults of Marshallese ancestry had Type II Diabetes.

== Religion ==
The majority of the Marshallese population, as of 2010, attend church worship services.

== Media ==
There is a radio station for the community, KMRW.

== Recreation ==
Marshall Islands Constitution Day is celebrated in Springdale. There is also a yearly festival meant to showcase Marshallese culture to the Springdale community, "Stroll the Atolls."In October 2024, the Crystal Bridges Museum, located in neighboring Bentonville, announced the exhibit Navigating Lolelaplap in collaboration with the Arkansas Coalition of Marshallese. The exhibit was active from October 2024 to the end of March 2025, and it celebrated Marshallese culture and tradition through various objects and stories curated by Northwest Arkansas' Marshallese community.

== In literature ==
By 2018, the University of Arkansas had engaged in multiple research programs related to this community.

== See also ==
- Marshallese Americans
- Enid, Oklahoma, which has another concentration of Marshallese people
