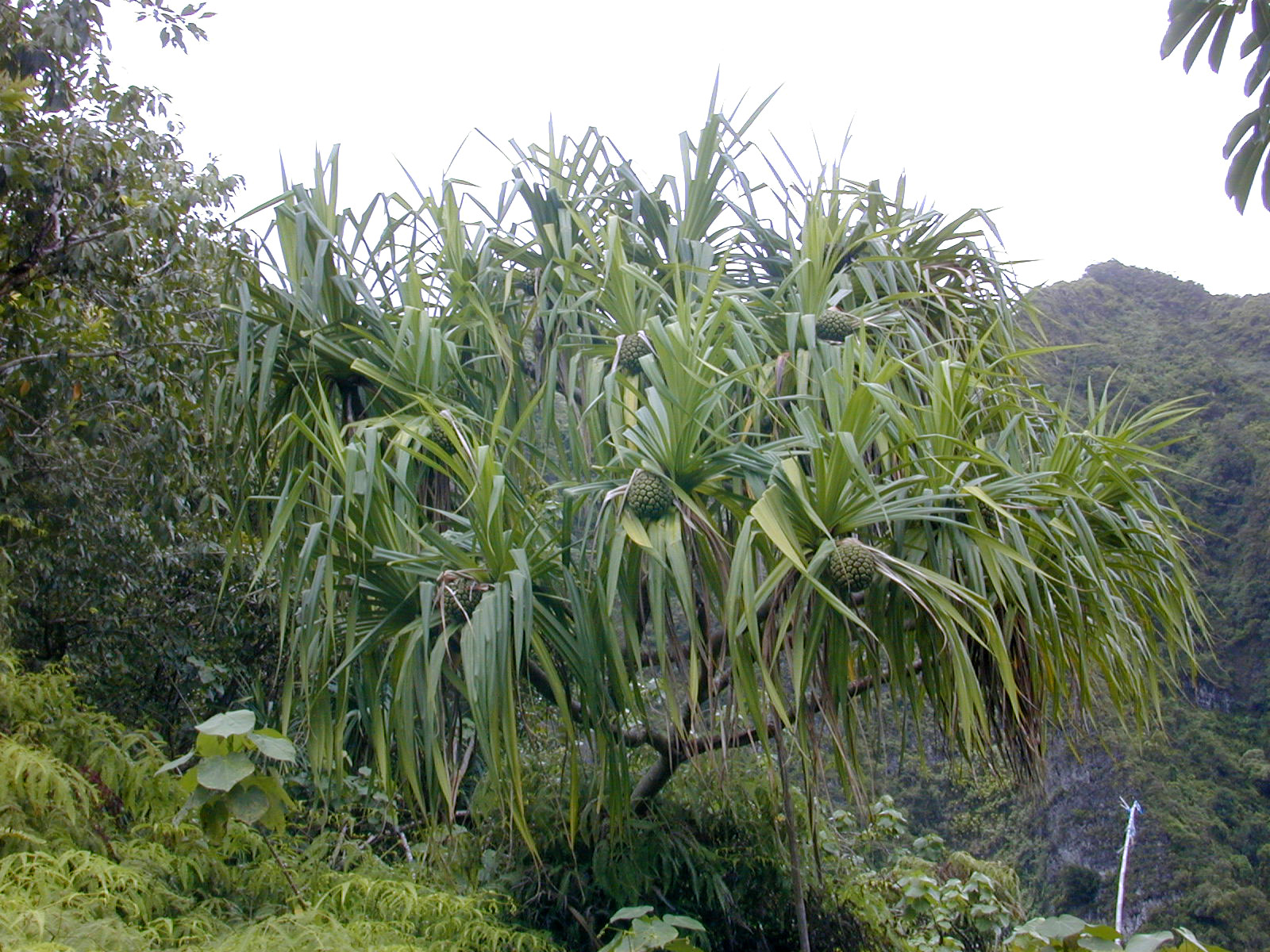
- Growing in the mountains of Oʻahu, Hawaii

Conservation status
- Least Concern (IUCN 3.1)

Scientific classification
- Kingdom: Plantae
- Clade: Tracheophytes
- Clade: Angiosperms
- Clade: Monocots
- Order: Pandanales
- Family: Pandanaceae
- Genus: Pandanus
- Species: P. tectorius

Binomial name
- Pandanus tectorius Parkinson

Synonyms
- 332 synonyms: Corypha laevis (Lour.) A.Chev.; Pandanus absonus H.St.John; Pandanus adscendens H.St.John; Pandanus aequor H.St.John; Pandanus aitutakiensis H.St.John; Pandanus akiakiensis H.St.John; Pandanus ala-kai Martelli; Pandanus amplexus H.St.John; Pandanus angulosus H.St.John; Pandanus anisos H.St.John; Pandanus aoraiensis H.St.John; Pandanus apionops H.St.John; Pandanus asauensis H.St.John; Pandanus ater H.St.John; Pandanus baptistii Misonne; Pandanus bassus H.St.John; Pandanus bathys H.St.John; Pandanus benignus H.St.John; Pandanus bergmanii F.Br.; Pandanus bicurvatus H.St.John; Pandanus blakei H.St.John; Pandanus boraboraensis H.St.John; Pandanus bothreus H.St.John; Pandanus bowenensis H.St.John; Pandanus brachypodus Kaneh.; Pandanus brownii H.St.John; Pandanus bullii Warb.; Pandanus cacuminatus H.St.John; Pandanus calostigma f. samoanus Martelli; Pandanus carolinensis Martelli; Pandanus chamissonis Gaudich.; Pandanus charancanus Kaneh.; Pandanus christophersenii H.St.John; Pandanus collatus H.St.John; Pandanus complanatus H.St.John; Pandanus cooperi (Martelli) H.St.John; Pandanus coronatus Martelli; Pandanus coronatus f. minor Martelli; Pandanus crassiaculeatus H.St.John; Pandanus crassus H.St.John; Pandanus crustatus Martelli; Pandanus crustatus f. minor Martelli; Pandanus cylindricus Kaneh.; Pandanus cylindricus var. sinnau Kaneh.; Pandanus cymatilis H.St.John; Pandanus decorus K.Koch; Pandanus dhaenei Pynaert; Pandanus dicheres H.St.John; Pandanus dilatatus Kaneh.; Pandanus discolor T.Moore & Mast.; Pandanus distinctus Martelli; Pandanus divaricatus H.St.John; Pandanus divergens Kaneh.; Pandanus dotyi H.St.John; Pandanus douglasii Gaudich.; Pandanus drakei H.St.John; Pandanus drolletianus Martelli; Pandanus duriocarpoides Kaneh.; Pandanus duriocarpus Martelli; Pandanus edwinii H.St.John; Pandanus elevatus H.St.John; Pandanus enchabiensis Kaneh.; Pandanus erythrophloeus Kaneh.; Pandanus evexus H.St.John; Pandanus exilis H.St.John; Pandanus exilis var. juddii H.St.John; Pandanus extralittoralis H.St.John; Pandanus eyesyes Kaneh.; Pandanus fahina H.St.John; Pandanus faramaa H.St.John; Pandanus fatuhivaensis H.St.John; Pandanus fatyanion (Kaneh.) Hosok.; Pandanus ferulifer H.St.John; Pandanus filiciatilis H.St.John; Pandanus fischerianus Martelli; Pandanus fischerianus f. bergmanii (F.Br.) B.C.Stone; Pandanus fischerianus var. bryanii B.C.Stone; Pandanus fischerianus f. bryanii B.C.Stone; Pandanus fischerianus f. compressus B.C.Stone; Pandanus fischerianus var. cooperi (Martelli) B.C.Stone; Pandanus fischerianus var. rockii (Martelli) B.C.Stone; Pandanus flintinsularis H.St.John; Pandanus fragrans Gaudich.; Pandanus fragrans f. koidzumii (Hosok.) B.C.Stone; Pandanus fragrans f. marianus B.C.Stone; Pandanus fragrans f. megastigma B.C.Stone; Pandanus fragrans f. rotensis (Hosok.) B.C.Stone; Pandanus fragrans f. savannarum B.C.Stone; Pandanus fragrans f. tinianensis B.C.Stone; Pandanus futunaensis H.St.John; Pandanus gambierensis H.St.John; Pandanus glomerosus H.St.John; Pandanus grantii H.St.John; Pandanus guamensis Martelli; Pandanus haapaiensis H.St.John; Pandanus hendersonensis H.St.John; Pandanus heronensis H.St.John; Pandanus hivaoaensis H.St.John; Pandanus horneinsularum H.St.John; Pandanus hosinoi Kaneh.; Pandanus hosokawae Kaneh.; Pandanus houmaensis H.St.John; Pandanus hubbardii H.St.John; Pandanus humericus H.St.John; Pandanus inarmatus H.St.John; Pandanus inermis Roxb.; Pandanus inflexus H.St.John; Pandanus infundibuliformis H.St.John; Pandanus insularis Kaneh.; Pandanus interior H.St.John; Pandanus intralaevis H.St.John; Pandanus jaluitensis Kaneh.; Pandanus javanicus K.Koch; Pandanus javanicus variegatus E.J.Lowe & W.Howard; Pandanus jonesii (F.Br.) H.St.John; Pandanus kafu Martelli; Pandanus kamptos H.St.John; Pandanus katensis F.Br.; Pandanus koidzumii Hosok.; Pandanus korrensis Kaneh.; Pandanus kraussii H.St.John; Pandanus kusaiensis Kaneh.; Pandanus laculatus H.St.John; Pandanus laevis Kunth; Pandanus laevis Lour.; Pandanus lakatwa Kaneh.; Pandanus lambasaensis H.St.John; Pandanus laticanaliculatus Kaneh.; Pandanus laticanaliculatus var. edulis Kaneh.; Pandanus latior H.St.John; Pandanus lauensis H.St.John; Pandanus lennei Pynaert; Pandanus licinus H.St.John; Pandanus limitaris H.St.John; Pandanus littoralis Jungh.; Pandanus longifolius H.L.Wendl.; Pandanus macfarlanei Martelli; Pandanus macrocephalus Kaneh.; Pandanus makateaensis H.St.John; Pandanus malatensis Blanco; Pandanus mangarevaensis H.St.John; Pandanus mariaensis H.St.John; Pandanus marquesasensis H.St.John; Pandanus matukuensis H.St.John; Pandanus mbalawa H.St.John; Pandanus meetiaensis H.St.John; Pandanus mei F.Br.; Pandanus mendanensis Martelli; Pandanus menne Kaneh.; Pandanus menziesii Gaudich.; Pandanus metius H.St.John; Pandanus minysocephalus H.St.John; Pandanus montaguei H.St.John; Pandanus mooreaensis H.St.John; Pandanus moschatus Miq.; Pandanus moschatus Rumph. ex Voigt; Pandanus motuensis H.St.John; Pandanus nandiensis H.St.John; Pandanus navigatorum Martelli; Pandanus navigatorum var. elbertii B.C.Stone; Pandanus niueensis H.St.John; Pandanus notialis H.St.John; Pandanus oblatiapicalis H.St.John; Pandanus oblaticonvexus H.St.John; Pandanus obliquus Kaneh.; Pandanus odontoides Hosok.; Pandanus odoratissimus var. laevigatus Martelli; Pandanus odoratissimus var. laevis (Warb.) Martelli; Pandanus odoratissimus f. major Martelli; Pandanus odoratissimus var. oahuensis Martelli; Pandanus odoratissimus var. parksii Martelli; Pandanus odoratissimus var. pyriformis Martelli; Pandanus odoratissimus var. savaiensis (Martelli) Martelli; Pandanus odoratissimus var. setchellii Martelli; Pandanus odoratissimus var. spurius Willd.; Pandanus odoratissimus var. suvaensis Martelli; Pandanus okamotoi Kaneh.; Pandanus onoilauensis H.St.John; Pandanus orarius H.St.John; Pandanus otemanuensis H.St.John; Pandanus ovalauensis H.St.John; Pandanus pachys H.St.John; Pandanus pakari H.St.John; Pandanus palkilensis Hosok.; Pandanus palmyraensis H.St.John; Pandanus pansus H.St.John; Pandanus paogo H.St.John; Pandanus papeariensis Martelli; Pandanus parhamii H.St.John; Pandanus parksii H.St.John; Pandanus patulior H.St.John; Pandanus pedunculatus R.Br.; Pandanus pedunculatus var. insularis B.C.Stone; Pandanus pedunculatus var. malagunensis B.C.Stone; Pandanus pedunculatus var. rendovensis B.C.Stone; Pandanus planus H.St.John; Pandanus politus Martelli; Pandanus ponapensis Martelli; Pandanus prismaticus Martelli; Pandanus pritchardiae H.St.John Pandanus prolixus; H.St.John Pandanus pseudomenne; Hosok. Pandanus pulposus; (Warb.) Martelli Pandanus pulposus var. cooperi; Martelli Pandanus puniceus; H.St.John Pandanus pusillus; H.St.John Pandanus pyriformis; (Martelli) H.St.John Pandanus radiatus; H.St.John Pandanus raiateaensis; H.St.John Pandanus raivavaensis; Martelli Pandanus raroiaensis; H.St.John Pandanus rectangulatus; Kaneh. Pandanus repens; Miq. Pandanus rhizophorensis; H.St.John Pandanus rhombocarpus; Kaneh. Pandanus rikiteaensis; H.St.John Pandanus rimataraensis; H.St.John Pandanus rockii; Martelli Pandanus rotensis; Hosok. Pandanus rotundatus; Kaneh. Pandanus rurutuensis; H.St.John Pandanus sabotan; Blanco Pandanus saipanensis; Kaneh. Pandanus salailuaensis; Martelli Pandanus saltuarius H.St.John; Pandanus samoanus (Martelli) H.St.John; Pandanus samoensis Warb.; Pandanus sanderi Sander; Pandanus savaiensis (Martelli) H.St.John; Pandanus schizocarpus F.Br.; Pandanus scopulorum Martelli; Pandanus seruaensis H.St.John; Pandanus sinuosus H.St.John; Pandanus sinuvadosus H.St.John; Pandanus smithii H.St.John; Pandanus spurius (Willd.) Miq.; Pandanus spurius var. weteringii Martelli; Pandanus stradbrookeensis H.St.John; Pandanus subaequalis H.St.John; Pandanus subhumerosus H.St.John; Pandanus subradiatus H.St.John; Pandanus subulorum Martelli; Pandanus suvaensis (Martelli) H.St.John; Pandanus sykesii H.St.John; Pandanus taepa (F.Br.) H.St.John; Pandanus tahaaensis H.St.John; Pandanus tahitensis Martelli; Pandanus tahitensis var. exiguus J.W.Moore; Pandanus tahitensis var. niueana B.C.Stone; Pandanus takaroaensis H.St.John; Pandanus tapeinos H.St.John; Pandanus taravaiensis H.St.John; Pandanus tauensis Martelli; Pandanus tectorius var. acutus Kaneh.; Pandanus tectorius var. angaurensis Kaneh.; Pandanus tectorius var. australianus Martelli; Pandanus tectorius var. brongniartii Martelli; Pandanus tectorius var. chamissonis (Gaudich.) Martelli; Pandanus tectorius var. cocosensis B.C.Stone; Pandanus tectorius f. convexus B.C.Stone; Pandanus tectorius var. douglasii (Gaudich.) Martelli; Pandanus tectorius var. drolletianus (Martelli) B.C.Stone; Pandanus tectorius var. exiguus (J.W.Moore) B.C.Stone; Pandanus tectorius var. fatyanion Kaneh.; Pandanus tectorius var. fragrans Martelli; Pandanus tectorius var. heronensis (H.St.John) B.C.Stone; Pandanus tectorius var. incrassatus B.C.Stone; Pandanus tectorius f. integrifolius Agustika, S.Santiago & A.P.Keim; Pandanus tectorius var. javanicus Martelli; Pandanus tectorius var. jonesii F.Br.; Pandanus tectorius var. laevigatus (Martelli) B.C.Stone; Pandanus tectorius var. laevis Warb.; Pandanus tectorius f. laevis (Warb.) Masam.; Pandanus tectorius var. littoralis (Jungh.) Martelli; Pandanus tectorius var. menziesii (Gaudich.) Martelli; Pandanus tectorius var. microcephalus Martelli; Pandanus tectorius var. novocaledonicus Martelli; Pandanus tectorius var. novoguineensis Martelli; Pandanus tectorius var. oahuensis (Martelli) B.C.Stone; Pandanus tectorius var. ongor Kaneh.; Pandanus tectorius var. parksii (Martelli) J.W.Moore; Pandanus tectorius var. pedunculatus (R.Br.) Domin; Pandanus tectorius f. philippinensis Martelli; Pandanus tectorius var. pulposus Warb.; Pandanus tectorius var. sanderi (Sander) B.C.Stone; Pandanus tectorius var. sandvicensis Warb.; Pandanus tectorius var. savaiensis Martelli; Pandanus tectorius var. spiralis Martelli; Pandanus tectorius var. stradbrookensis (H.St.John) B.C.Stone; Pandanus tectorius var. sumbavensis Martelli; Pandanus tectorius var. suringaensis Martelli; Pandanus tectorius var. taepa F.Br.; Pandanus tectorius var. timorensis Martelli; Pandanus tectorius var. tubuaiensis (Martelli) B.C.Stone; Pandanus tectorius var. uapensis F.Br.; Pandanus tectorius var. upoluensis Martelli; Pandanus tectorius var. yorkensis (H.St.John) B.C.Stone; Pandanus tectorius var. zollingeri Martelli; Pandanus terrireginae H.St.John; Pandanus tessellatus Martelli; Pandanus tikeiensis H.St.John; Pandanus tima H.St.John; Pandanus timoeensis H.St.John; Pandanus tolotomensis Glassman; Pandanus tomilensis Kaneh.; Pandanus tongaensis H.St.John; Pandanus trapaneus H.St.John; Pandanus tritosphaericus H.St.John; Pandanus trukensis Kaneh.; Pandanus tuamotensis F.Br.; Pandanus tuamotensis var. locularis F.Br.; Pandanus tuamotensis var. typica F.Br.; Pandanus tubuaiensis Martelli; Pandanus tupaiensis H.St.John; Pandanus tutuilaensis Martelli; Pandanus uea H.St.John; Pandanus upoluensis (Martelli) Martelli; Pandanus upoluensis var. angulosus Martelli; Pandanus upoluensis var. minor Martelli; Pandanus utiyamae Kaneh.; Pandanus vahitahiensis H.St.John; Pandanus vandra H.St.John; Pandanus vangeertii Van Geert ex T.Moore & Mast.; Pandanus variegatus Miq.; Pandanus veitchii Mast.; Pandanus virginalis H.St.John; Pandanus viri H.St.John; Pandanus viridinsularis H.St.John; Pandanus volkensii Kaneh.; Pandanus wilderi H.St.John; Pandanus yorkensis H.St.John; Pandanus yunckeri H.St.John

= Pandanus tectorius =

Species of plant

Pandanus tectorius is a species of Pandanus (screwpine) that is native to Malesia, Papuasia, eastern Australia, and the Pacific Islands. It grows in the coastal lowlands typically near the edge of the ocean. Common names in English include thatch screwpine, Tahitian screwpine, hala tree (pū hala in Hawaiian) and pandanus. The fruit is edible and sometimes known as hala fruit.

The local Hawaiian name hala derives ultimately from Proto-Malayo-Polynesian *paŋdan which is also the base for the Pandanus generic name via Malay: pandan; the Malay name for the plant itself is pandan laut (lit. 'sea pandan').

== Description ==
P. tectorius is a small tree that grows upright to reach 4–14 m (13–46 ft) in height. The single trunk is slender with brown ringed bark. It is spiny, grows to 4.5–11 m (15–35 ft) in width, and forks at a height of 4–8 metres (13–26 ft). It is supported by aerial roots (prop roots) that firmly anchors the tree to the ground. Roots sometimes grow along the branch, and they grow at wide angles in proportion to the trunk.

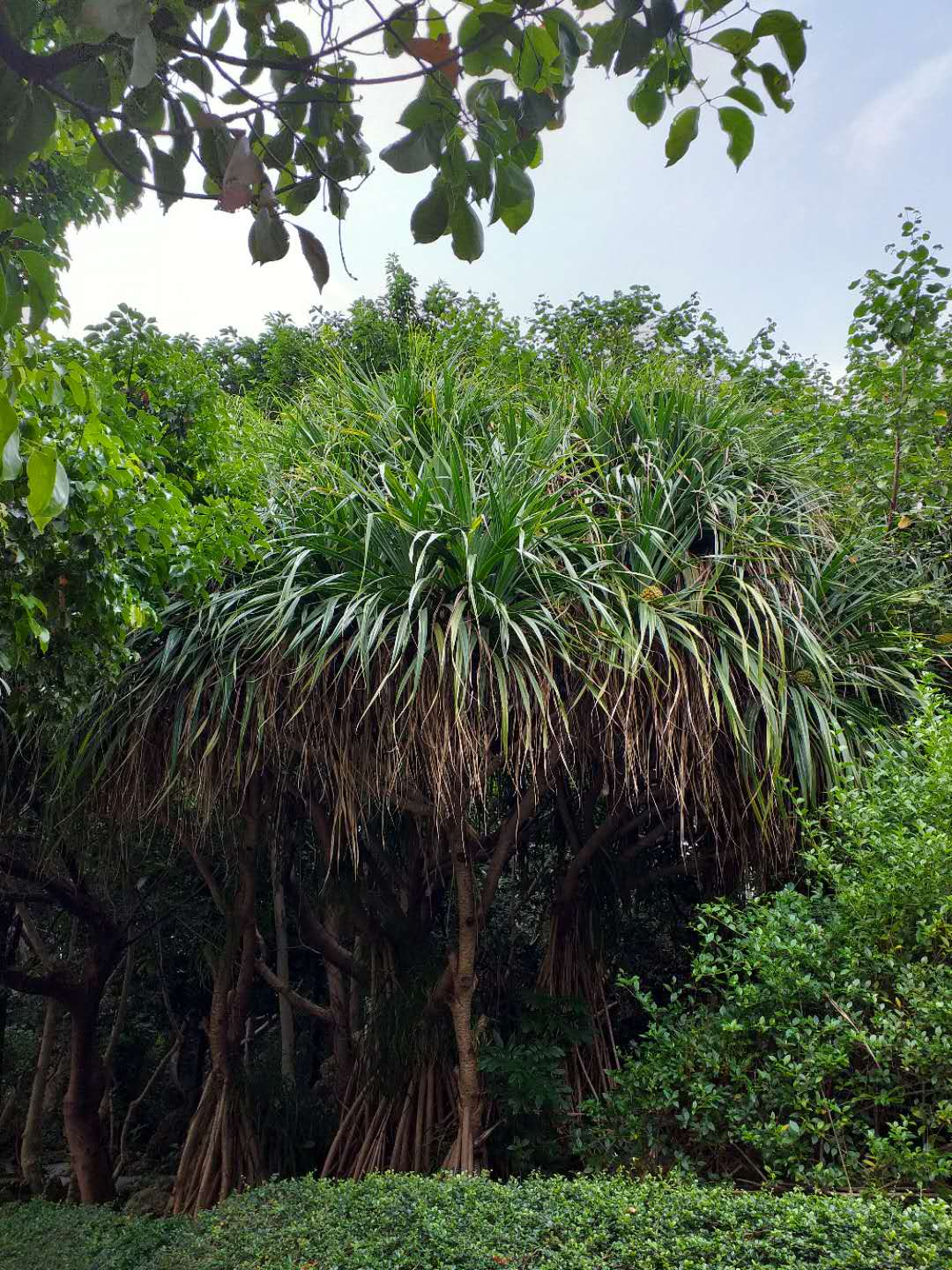
Growth habit

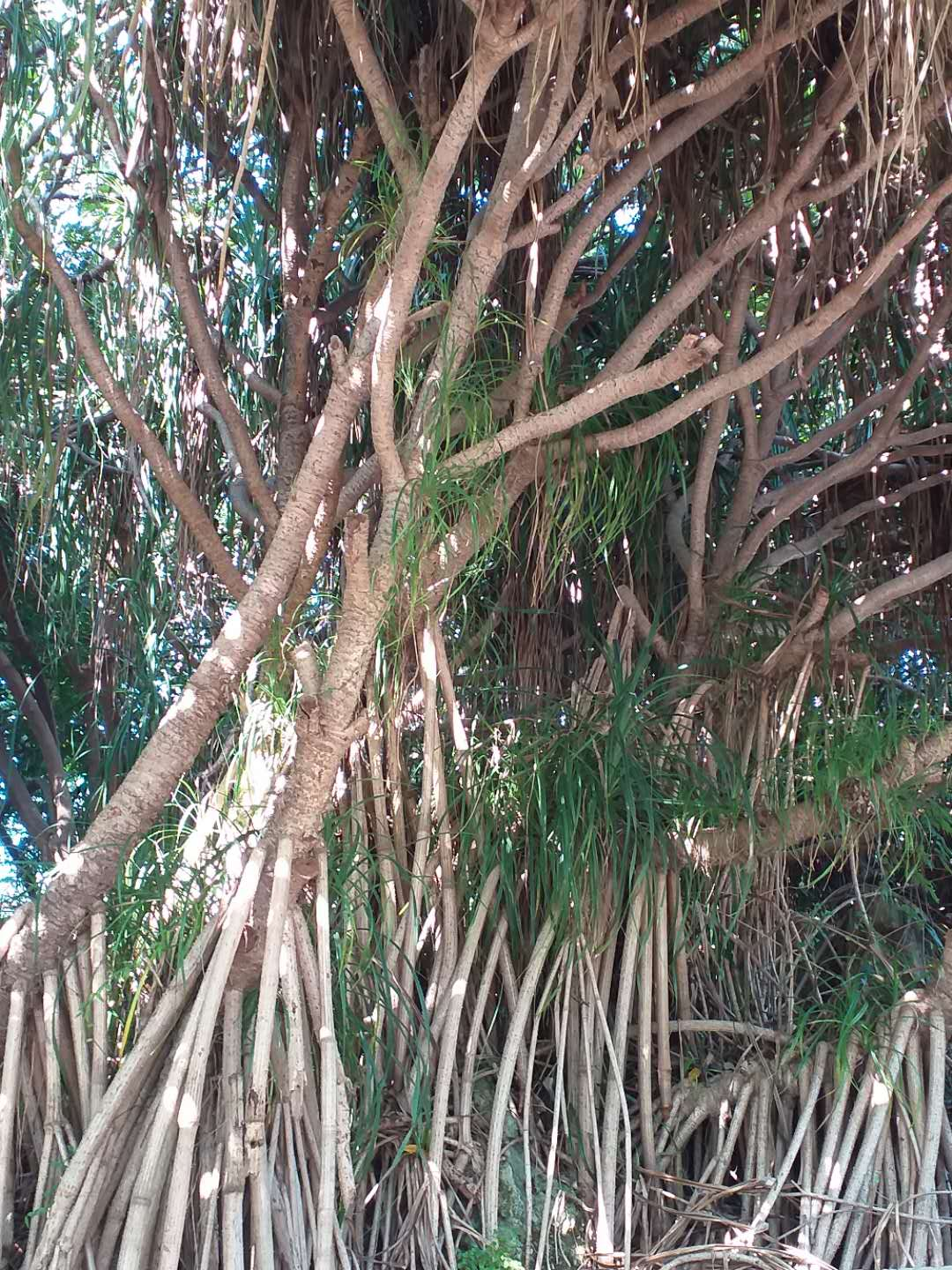
Aerial roots

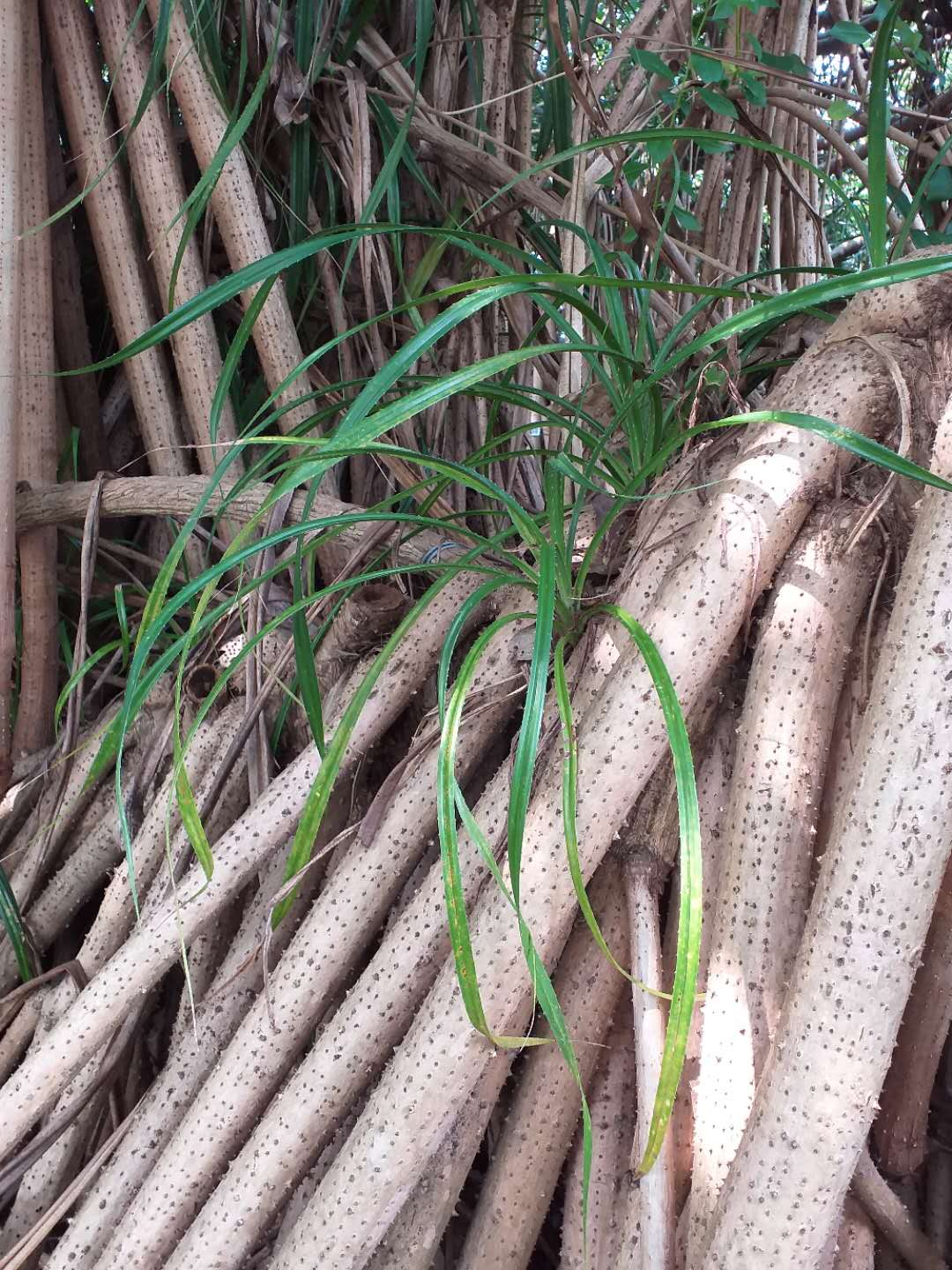
Spiny aerial roots and leaflets

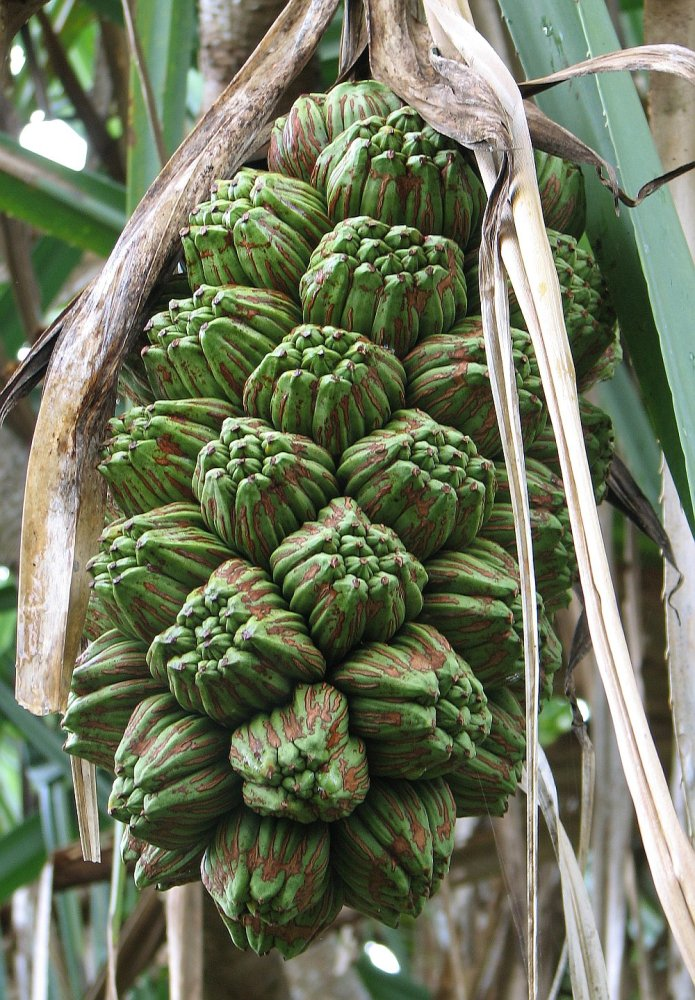
Fruit showing phalanges

=== Leaves ===
The leaves are usually 90–150 cm (3–5 ft) in length and 5–7 cm (2–2 3/4 in) in width. They possess saw-like margins. Some varieties have spines along the edges and ribs throughout the leaves. The leaves are spirally arranged at the end of the branches.

=== Flowers ===
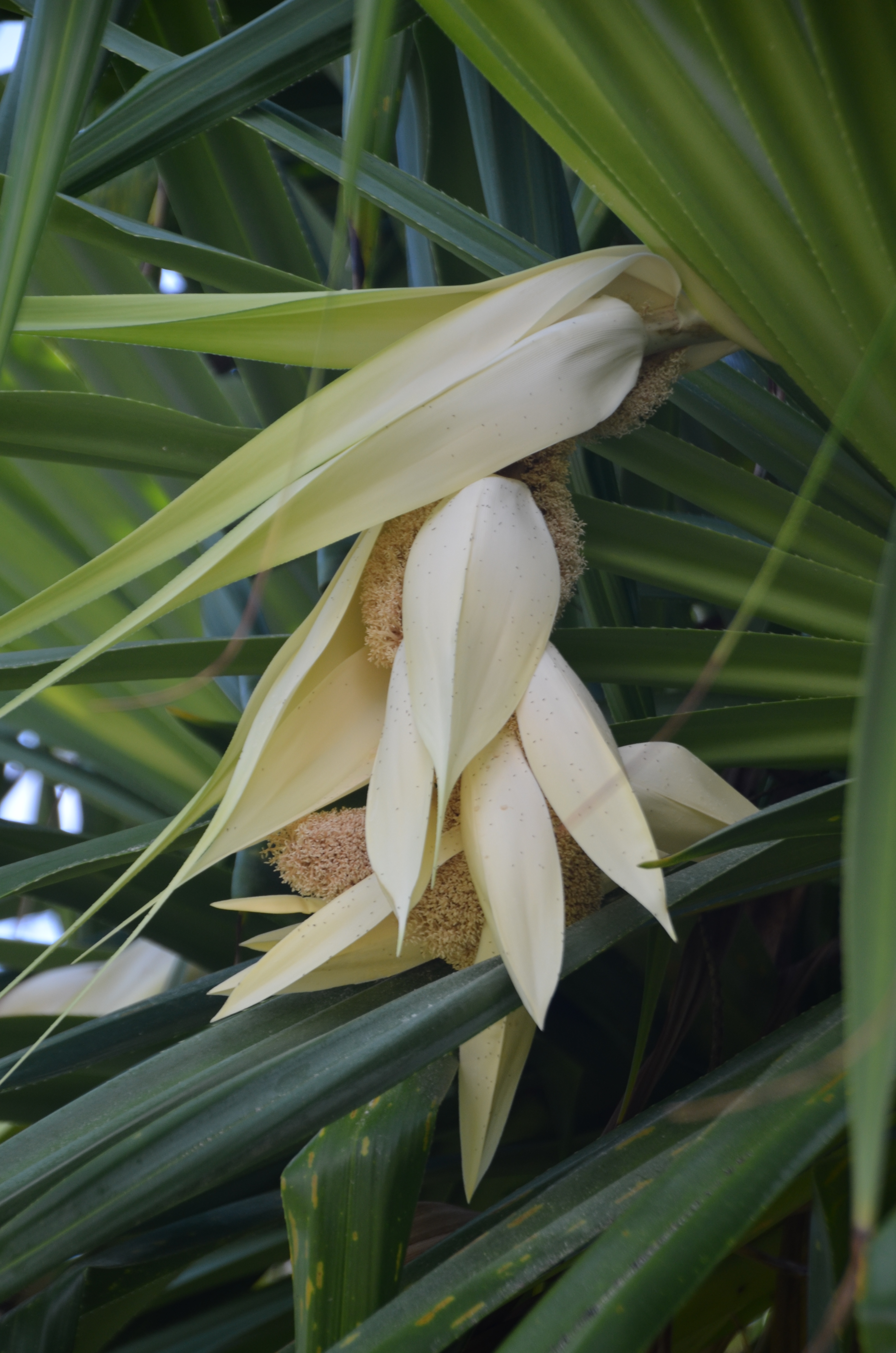
Male flower

Pandanus tectorius is dioecious, meaning male and female flowers are borne on separate trees, with very different male and female flowers. Male flowers are arranged in racemes and are small, fragrant, and short-lived, lasting only a single day. The flowers are grouped in 3 and gathered in large clusters surrounded by big, white bracts. these clusters are about 1 ft in length and are fragrant. Female flowers resemble pineapples.

In Hawaiʻi the male flower is called hīnano and the bracts are used for making very fine mats (moena hīnano' or ʻahu hīnano).

=== Fruit ===
The female P. tectorius trees produce a segmented, large fruit. Although not closely related, the fruit resembles a pineapple. The fruit of P. tectorius is either ovoid, ellipsoid, subglobose or globose with a diameter of 4–20 cm (1 1/2–7 3/4 in) and a length of 8–30 cm (3 1/4–11 3/4 in). The fruit is made up of 38–200 wedge-like phalanges, often referred to as keys or carpels, which have an outer fibrous husk and are 8 inches in length. There are roughly 40 to 80 keys in each fruit and the color of the fruit can be yellow, orange, or red with a green top. Phalanges contain two seeds on average, with a maximum of eight reported. The phalanges are buoyant, and the seeds within them can remain viable for many months while being transported by ocean currents.

== Taxonomy ==
Pandanus tectorius was first described by Sydney Parkinson in 1774. It is an angiosperm belonging to the genus Pandanus of the family Pandanaceae.

== Distribution and habitat ==
Pandanus tectorius grows natively from the Philippines through the Pacific Ocean to Hawaii. It is found in parts of Malesia (the Cocos (Keeling) Islands, Java, the Lesser Sunda Islands, the Maluku Islands and the Philippines), throughout Papuasia, and in most of the tropical Pacific.

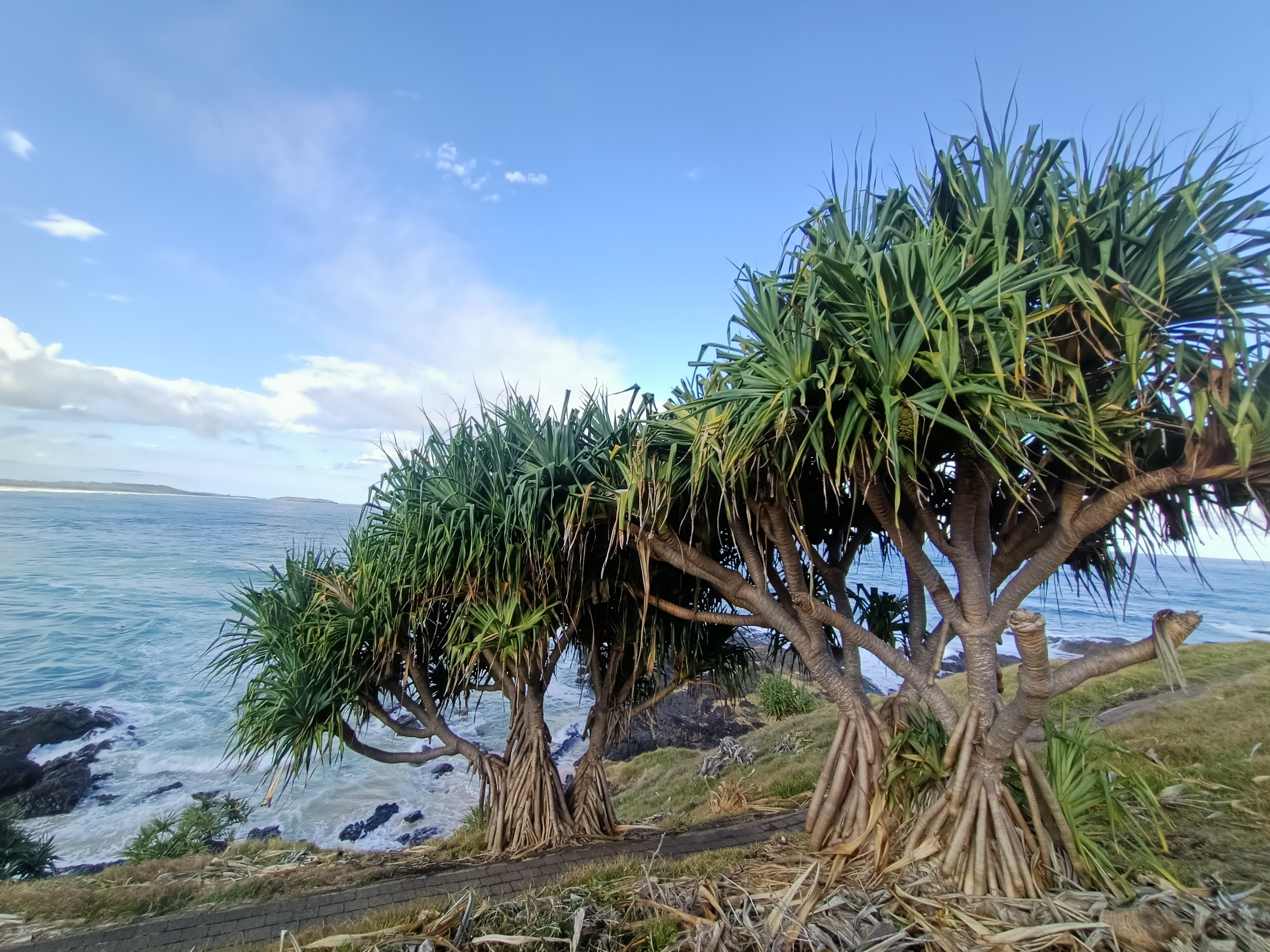
Overlooking the ocean at Sawtell, Australia.

In Australia, it is native to an area from Port Macquarie in New South Wales to northern Queensland. Both the US and the Hawaiian Islands recognize only one indigenous species, P. tectorius. Its exact native range is unknown due to extensive cultivation; it may be an early Polynesian introduction to many of the more isolated Pacific islands on which it occurs. These islands include Micronesia and Melanesia. In Hawaii, P. tectorius is found natively on all the main islands except Kahoʻolawe, and it is known to have predated human settlement, based on seed and pollen samples taken from Kauaʻi's Makauwahi Cave.

Pandanus tectorius naturally grows in coastal regions, such as on mangrove margins and beaches, at elevations from sea level to 610 m (2,000 ft). It requires 1,500–4,000 mm (59–157 in) of annual rainfall and seasons will fluctuate from wet to dry.

Pandanus tectorius is considered more drought tolerant than coconut trees. The trees have adapted to drought by reducing fruiting. Thatch Screwpine is well adapted to grow in the many soil types present on coasts, including quartz sand, coral sand, and peat, as well as in limestone and basalt. P. tectorius is salt and wind tolerant and favors slightly acidic to basic soil (pH of 6–10). The trees are strong and can typically withstand tropical storms. It prefers to grow in full sunlight, but grows well with 30-50% shade. It will not tolerate shade above 70%.

== Ecology ==
There are a wide range of natural enemies that pose a threat to P. tectorius such as parasites, pathogens, and herbivores. They attack the leaves, roots, stems, and growing points. The stick insect Megacrania batesii lives and feeds only on P. tectorius and two other Pandanus species.

Pandanus tectorius in Australia is threatened by a sap-sucking insect, Jamella australiae, a species of the genus Jamella of the subfamily Flatinae, known as the Pandanus planthopper. It has caused much damage to plants on the northern coast of New South Wales, before making its way up the coast to Noosa and the Gold Coast in Queensland in the 1990s. Since then it has infested pandanus further north, killing about 80 per cent of the P. tectorius population to the south of Gladstone, Queensland, and has since reached Yeppoon on the Capricorn Coast, where P. tectorius plays an important part in preventing coastal erosion. A natural predator in the form of a wasp native to northern Queensland, Aphanomerus pusillus, has been introduced on Fraser Island and in Byfield National Park as one of methods used to combat the pest. Other methods used on Fraser Island including the injection of insecticide into the plant, stripping infested leaves away, and breeding new plants from local stock. The wasp can only be used in the warmer months on the island, as it does not thrive in the cooler climate of southern Queensland.

== Cultivation ==
Pandanus tectorius may be grown from seed or cuttings – the former will flower at around 15 years and the latter usually flowers by 3 to 4 years of age. Female trees typically flower one to three times per year while male trees will flower every 2 months. It is thought to reproduce sexually in Hawaii, but there is some evidence that apomixis occurs. Small insects, such as bees, and wind are usually the pollinators. It takes 1 to 2 years from pollination to produce fruit on female trees.

Seasons vary amongst locations and varieties. For example, in Fiji the pollination season is March to May, in northern Australia it is April to August, and in Micronesia, there are two season December to March and July to September. Most varieties produce 8 to 12 fruits per tree every 2 years. Each fruit usually weighs between 7 and 15 kg (15 and 33 lb) and contains 35 to 80 edible keys.

Pandanus tectorius plants are usually propagated by seed in Hawaii. Soak the keys in cool tap water for 5 days while frequently changing the water. Viable keys will float, so it is important to keep them. In Growing native Hawaiian plants: a how-to guide for the gardner, Bornhorst says to remove the fleshy layer of the key and then bury the seed half-way in planting soil. It is important to keep the soil moist.

P. tectorius can also be grown from large cuttings. Selected forms are propagated by stem cuttings in Micronesia. Morphological traits looked for include aerial roots. Plants selected have two-thirds of their leaves trimmed off to prevent water loss. In Native Hawaiian plants for tropical seaside landscaping, Moriarty says for best results use mature branches with leaves and small aerial roots. Then root in a sand bed. Plants grown from cuttings produce fruit in 4 to 6 years.

Propagation by grafting is not applicable.

== Uses ==
The fruit is edible. Some varieties and cultivars contain significant amounts of calcium oxalate, and thus need thorough cooking before being consumed. Other cultivars contain very little to no calcium oxalate and can be eaten raw. It is an important food source in the atolls of Micronesia and Polynesia, with the fruit commonly eaten raw or turned into a dried paste (such as mokwan in the Marshall Islands or te tuae in Kiribati) or flour. It is also one of the traditional foods of Maldivian cuisine. The fibrous nature of the fruit also serves as a natural dental floss. It is also used in Samoan culture as a ula fala, a necklace made out of the dried fruit painted in red and worn by the matai during special occasions and functions.

Australian Aboriginal peoples extracted the slender, edible seeds. This seed, and the fruit, was an important food.

The tree's leaves are often used as flavoring for sweet dishes. It is also used in Sri Lankan cookery, where the leaves are used to flavor a variety of curries. Leaves were used by the Polynesians to make baskets, mats, outrigger canoe sails, thatch roofs, and grass skirts. Use of leaves in material culture was also common to Austronesian peoples back in Southeast Asia (like the Malays) prior to industrialization and modernization.

The fragrant male flowers are used in perfumery and are also distilled to make kewra.

A large shrub or small tree of immense cultural, health, and economic importance in the Pacific, it is second only to coconut on atolls. It grows wild mainly in semi-natural vegetation in littoral habitats throughout the tropical and subtropical Pacific, where it can withstand drought, strong winds, and salt spray. It propagates readily from seed, but it is also widely propagated from branch cuttings by local people for farms and home gardens. It grows fairly quickly, and all parts are used, from the nutritious fruits of edible varieties to the poles and branches in construction to the leaves for weaving and garlands. The plant is prominent in Pacific culture and tradition, including local medicine.

Hundreds of cultivated varieties are known by their local names and characteristics of fruits, branches, and leaves. At present, there is evidence that this diversity is declining, with certain varieties becoming difficult to find. The reasons include less replanting, deforestation, fire, flagging interest by the new generation, and rapid population growth leading to urbanization.

== In culture ==
The seal of Punahou School in Honolulu, Hawaii, features the hala tree, in part because lauhala, the art of weaving with the leaves of that tree, is pivotal to the history of the island, with everything from houses to pillows being made in this fashion. Local legend tells of an aged Hawaiian couple who lived long ago above the present Punahou campus, and had to travel far for water. They prayed each night for a spring, but to no avail. Finally one night, in a dream answering their prayers, they were told to uproot the stump of an old hala tree. They did as they were told and found a spring of clear, sweet water, which they named Ka Punahou, the New Spring. According to legend, Punahou School's lily pond is fed by this same spring.

== Gallery ==
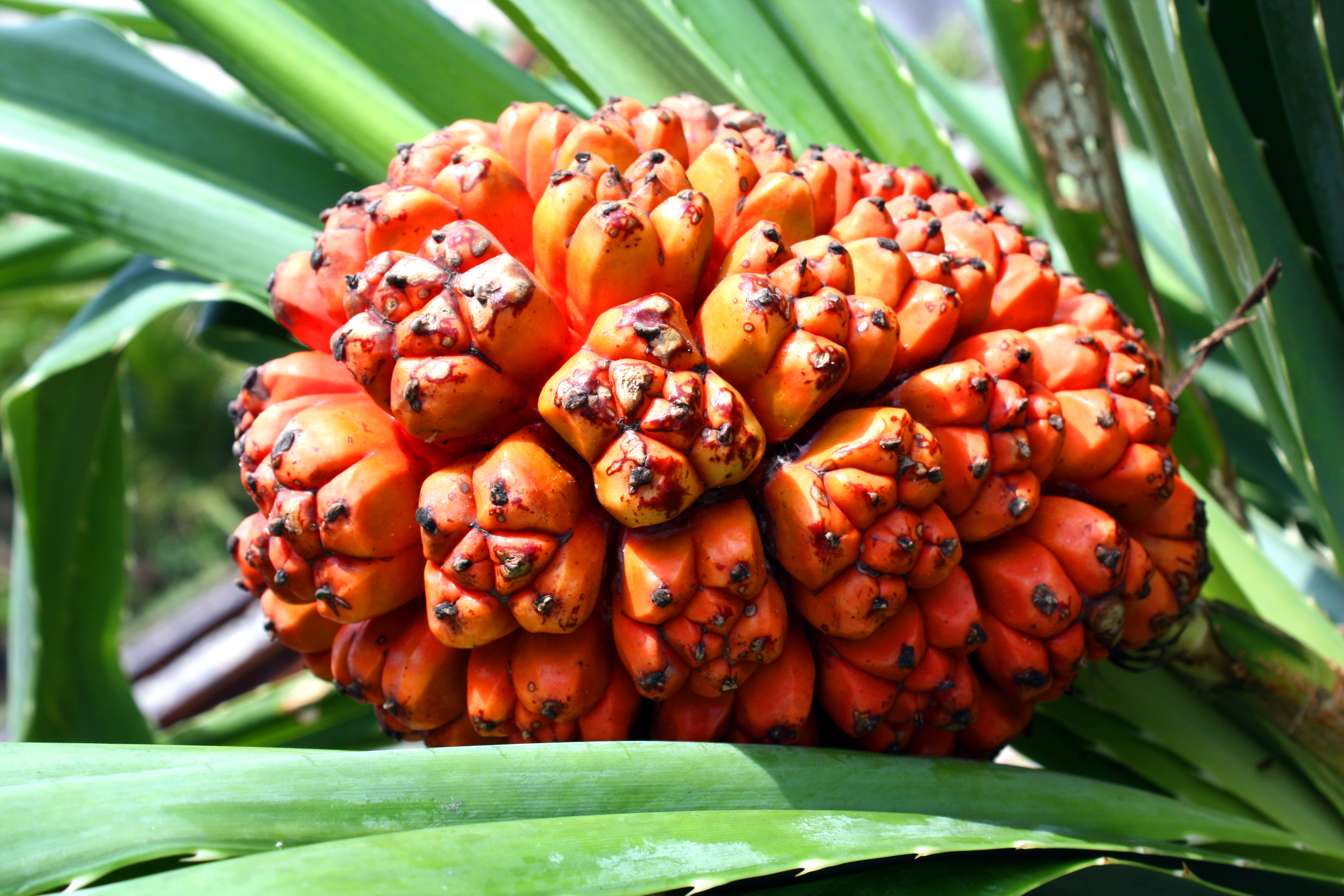
Ripe fruit

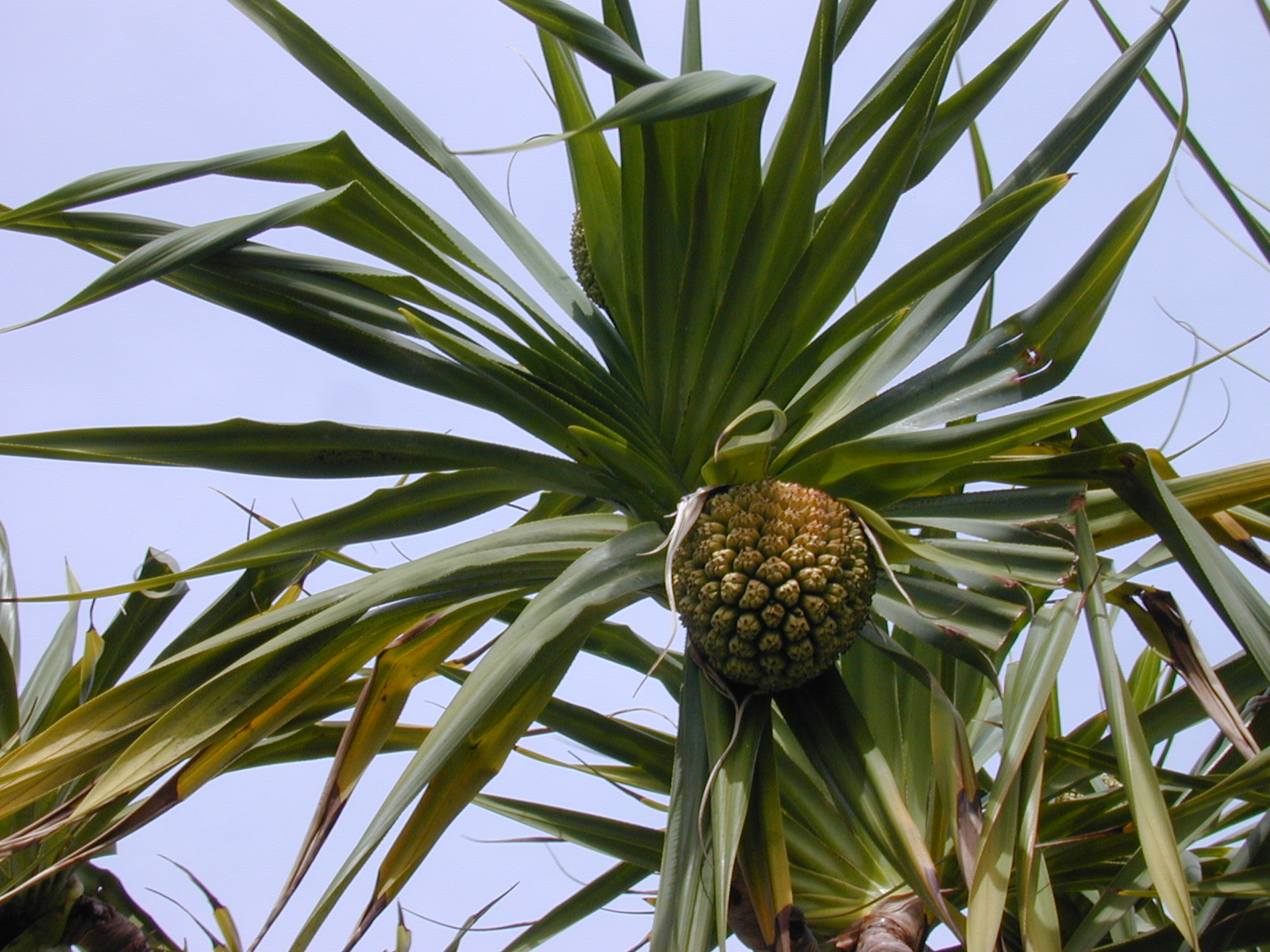
Fruit

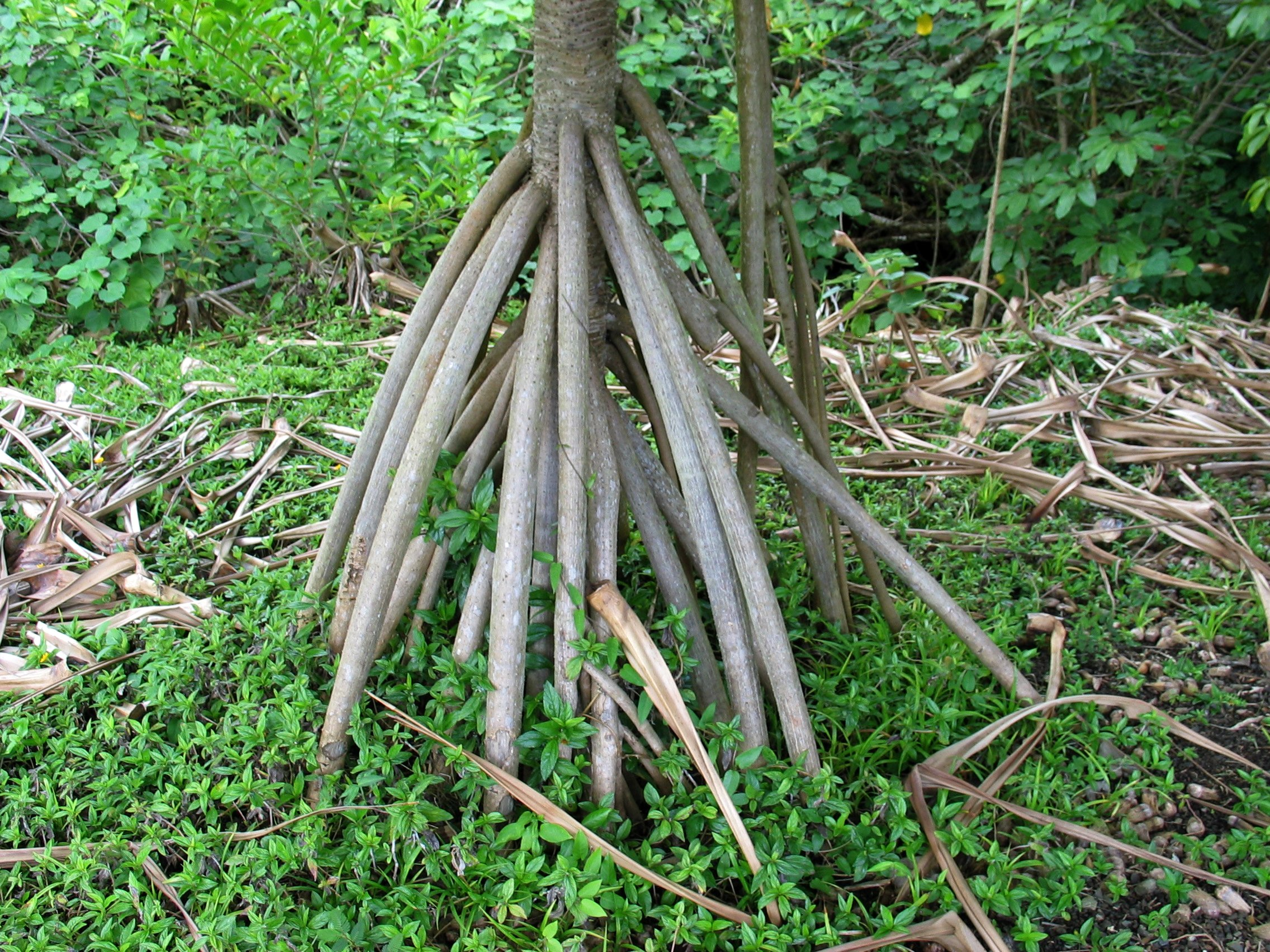
Roots

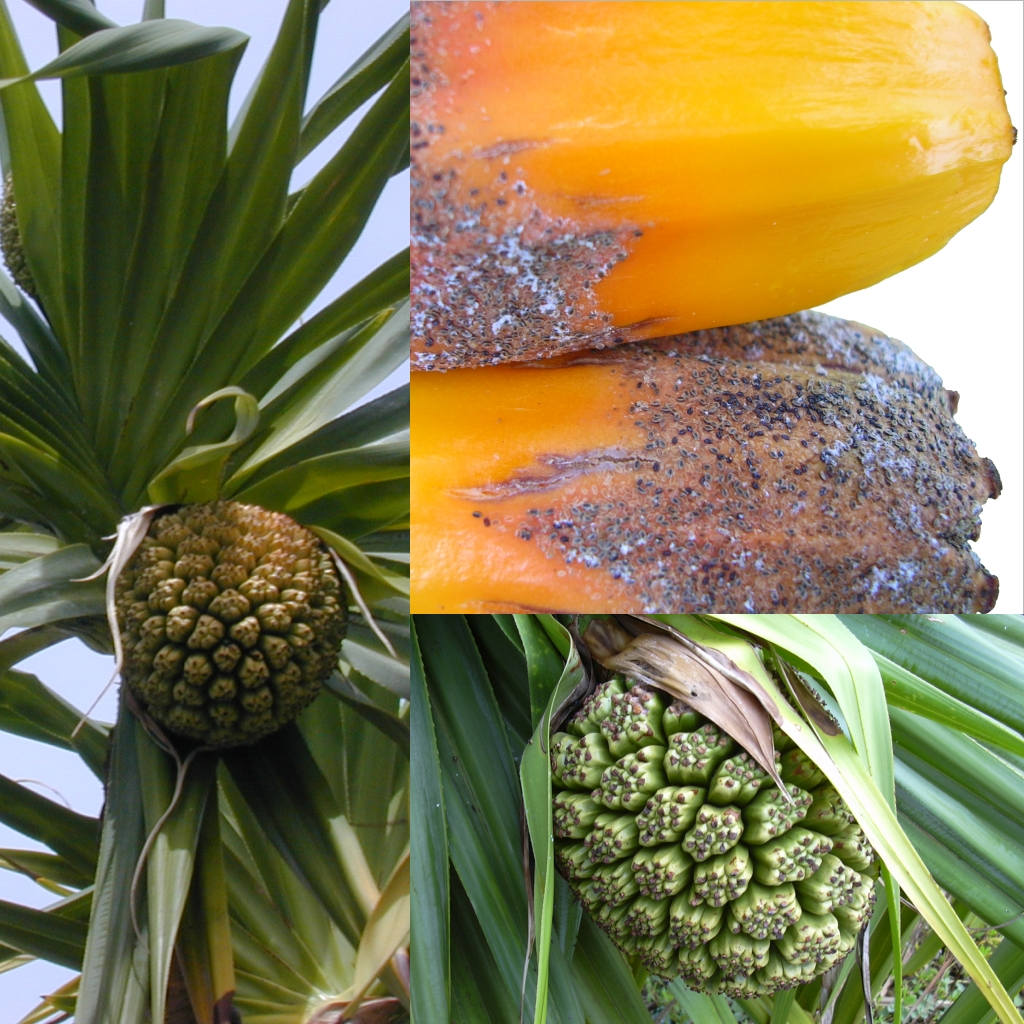
Close up of keys, or stamen

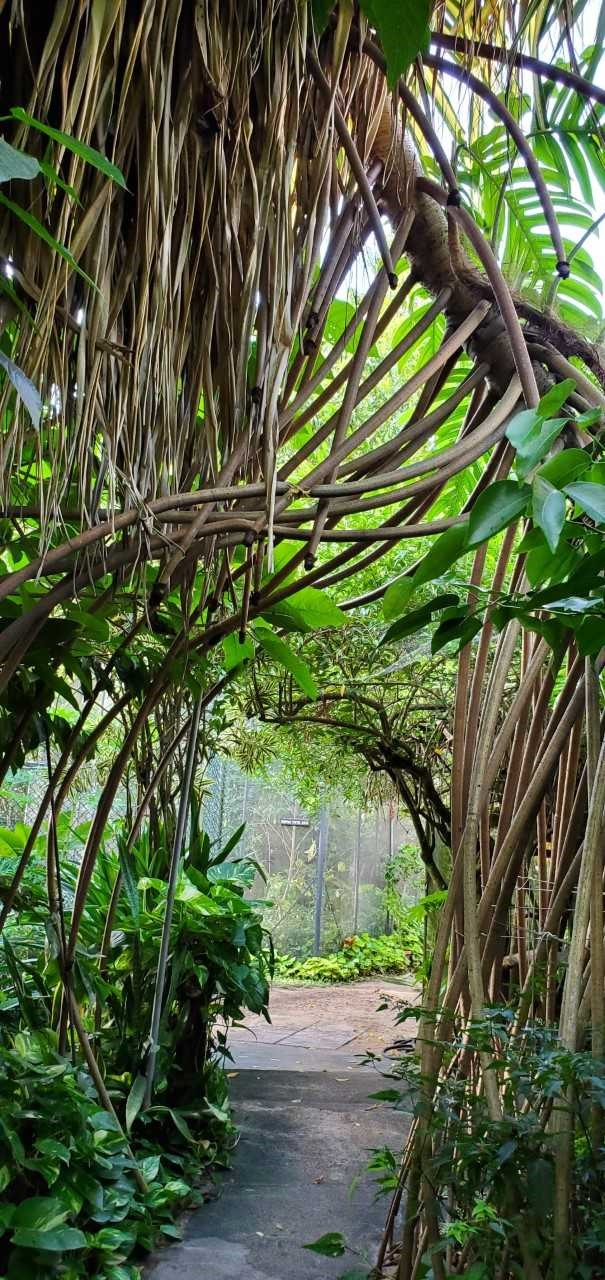
Aerial roots trained as an arch, Guam Zoo

== See also ==
- Domesticated plants and animals of Austronesia
