= Japonica rice =

Variety of Asian rice

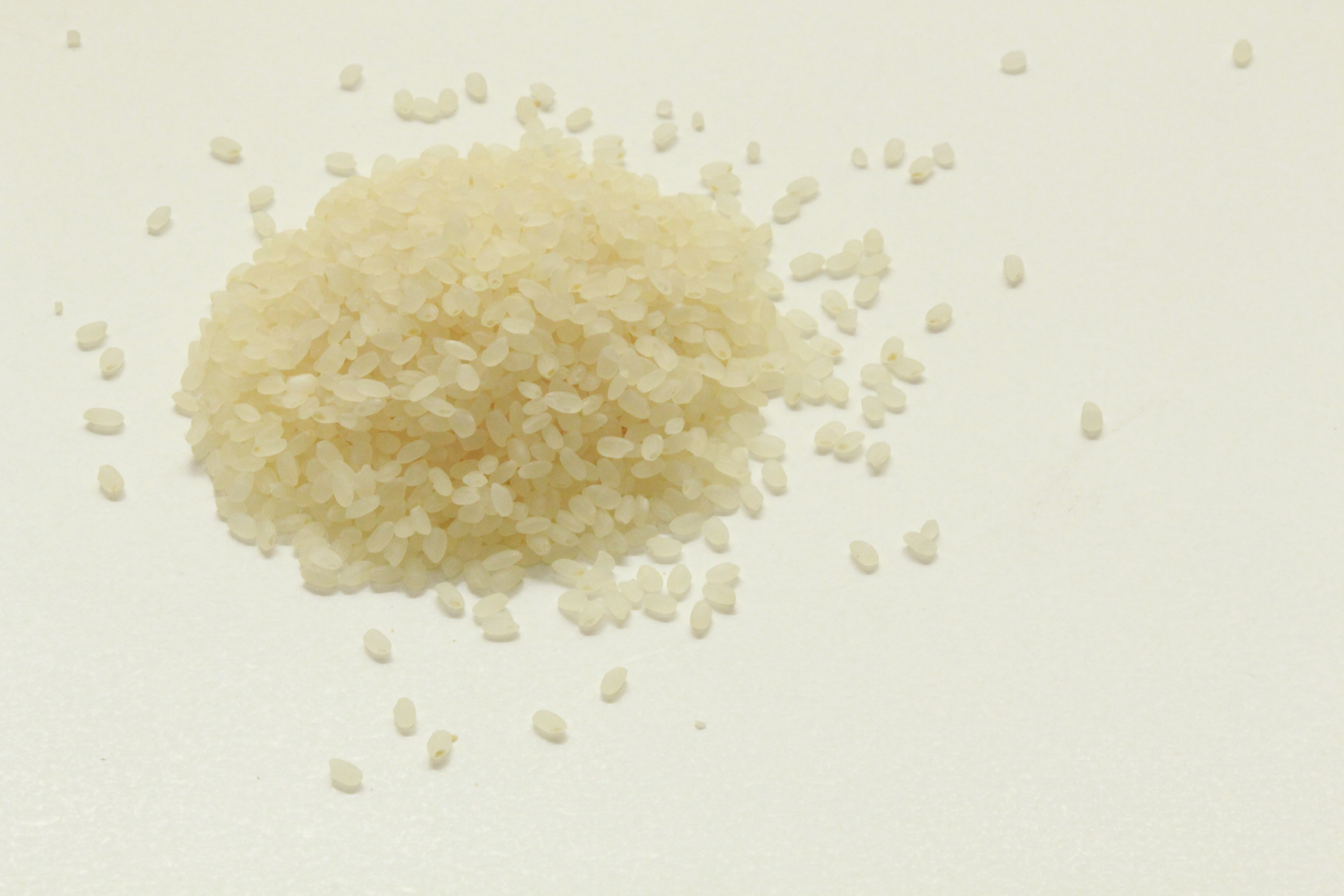
Grains of japonica rice

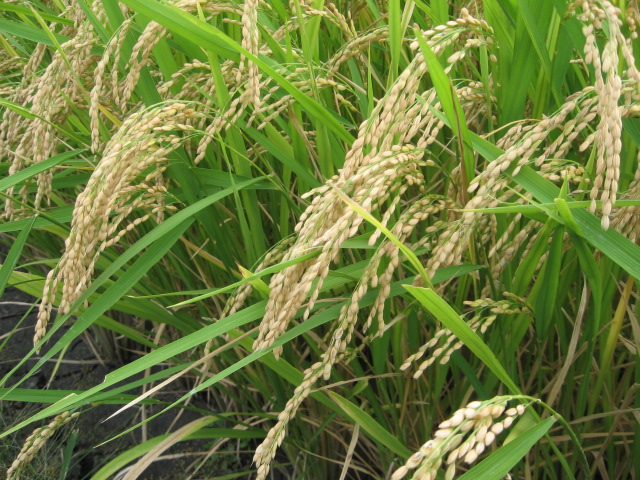
Japonica rice field in Japan

Japonica rice (Oryza sativa subsp. japonica), sometimes called sinica rice, is one of the two major domestic types of Asian rice varieties. Japonica rice is extensively cultivated and consumed in East Asia and Italy, whereas in most other regions indica rice is the dominant type of rice. Japonica rice originated from Central China, where it was first domesticated along the Yangtze River basin approximately 9,500 to 6,000 years ago.

== Classification ==
The subspecies japonica can be classified into three subgroups, 'temperate japonica', 'tropical japonica' (obsolete designations: 'javanica'; Oryza sativa subsp. javanica), and 'aromatic'. Temperate japonica is cultivated in East Asia (China, Japan, Korea, and Vietnam), while tropical japonica is in Indonesia, Madagascar, and also the Americas.

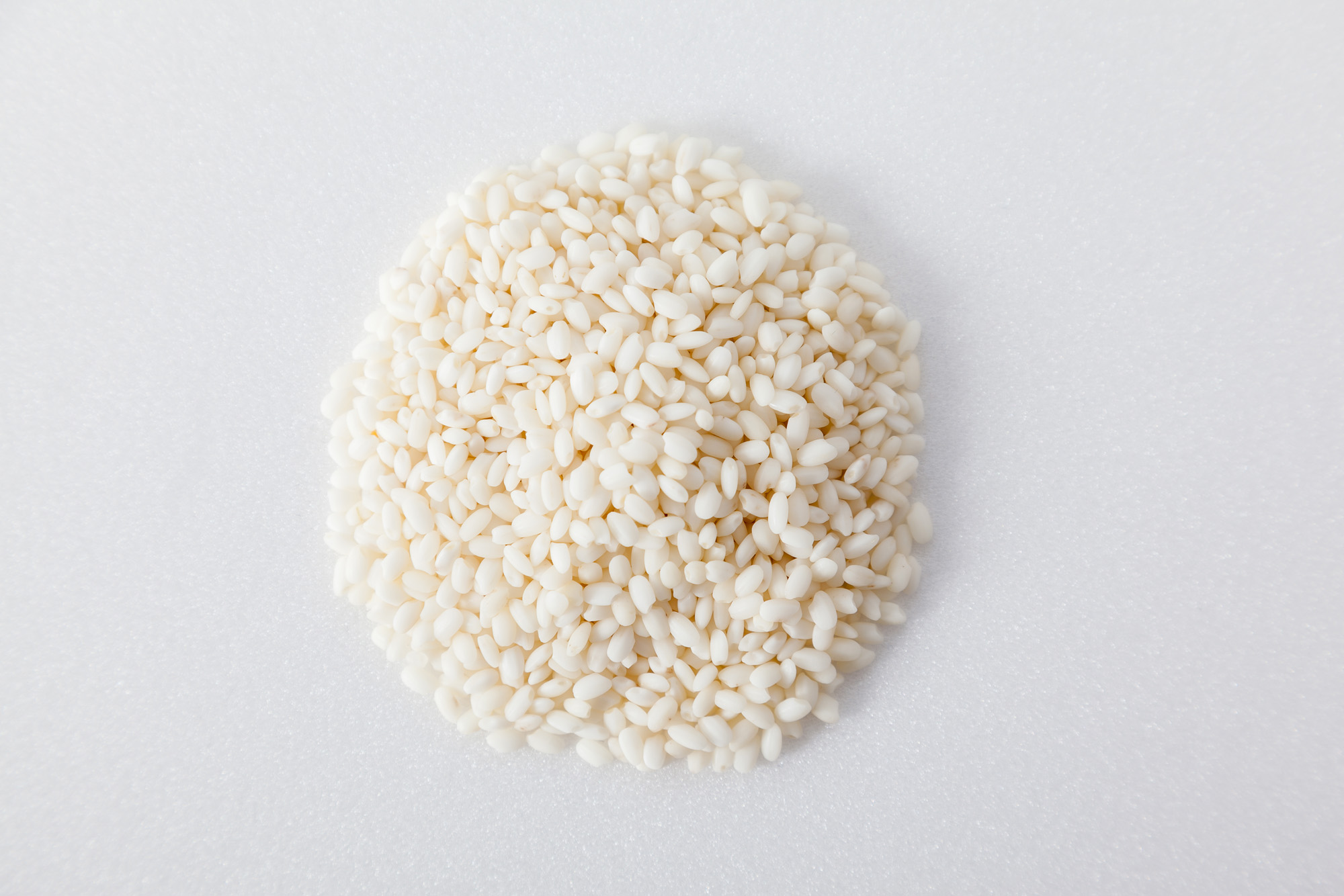
Glutinous japonica rice

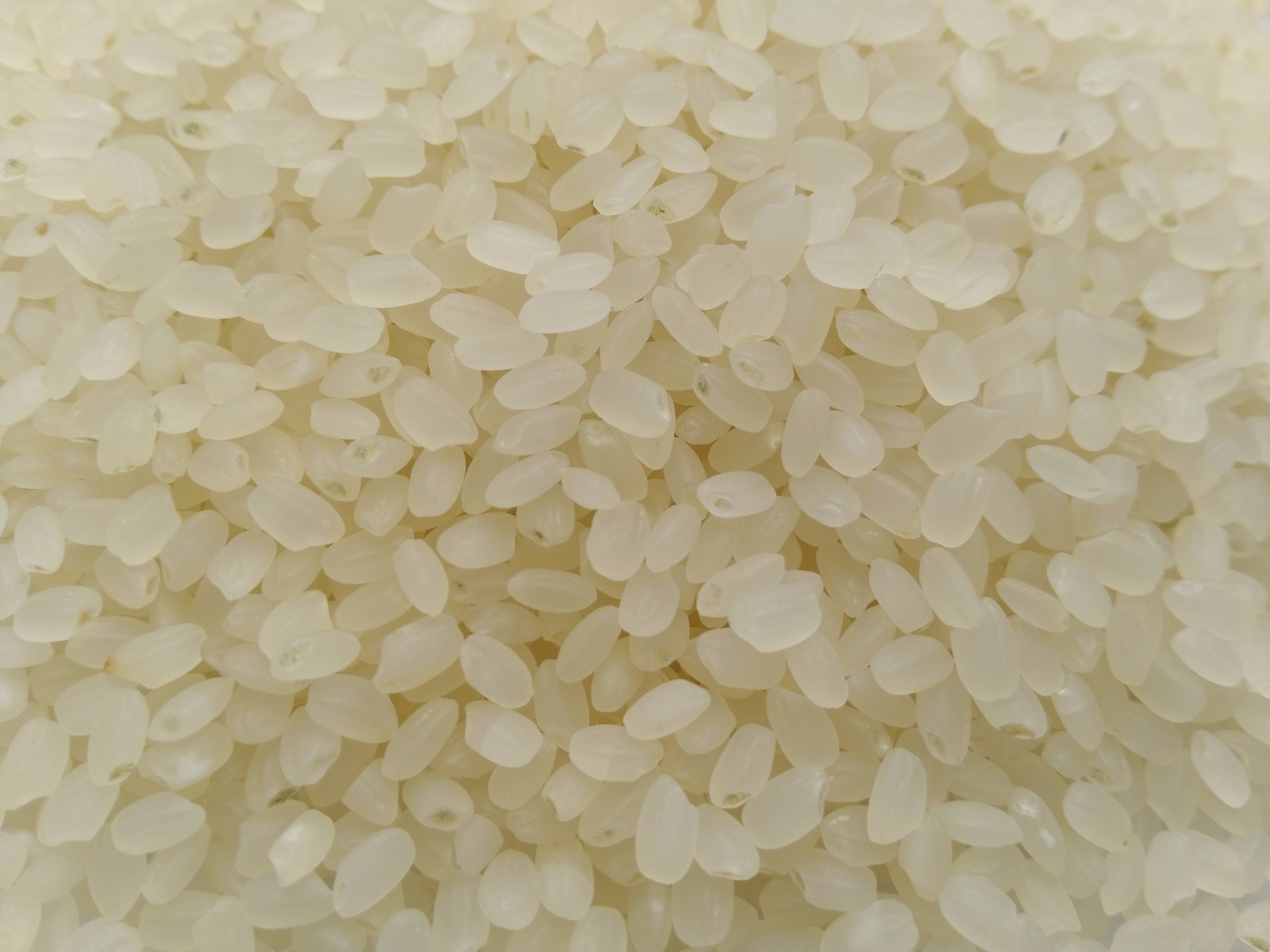
Aromatic japonica rice

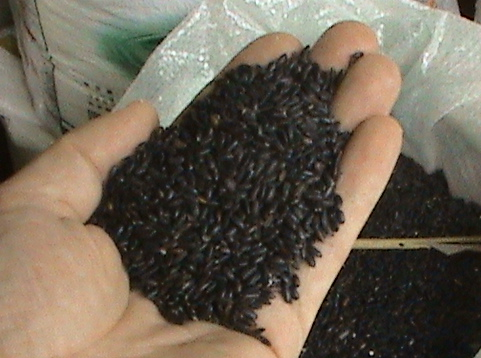
Black japonica rice

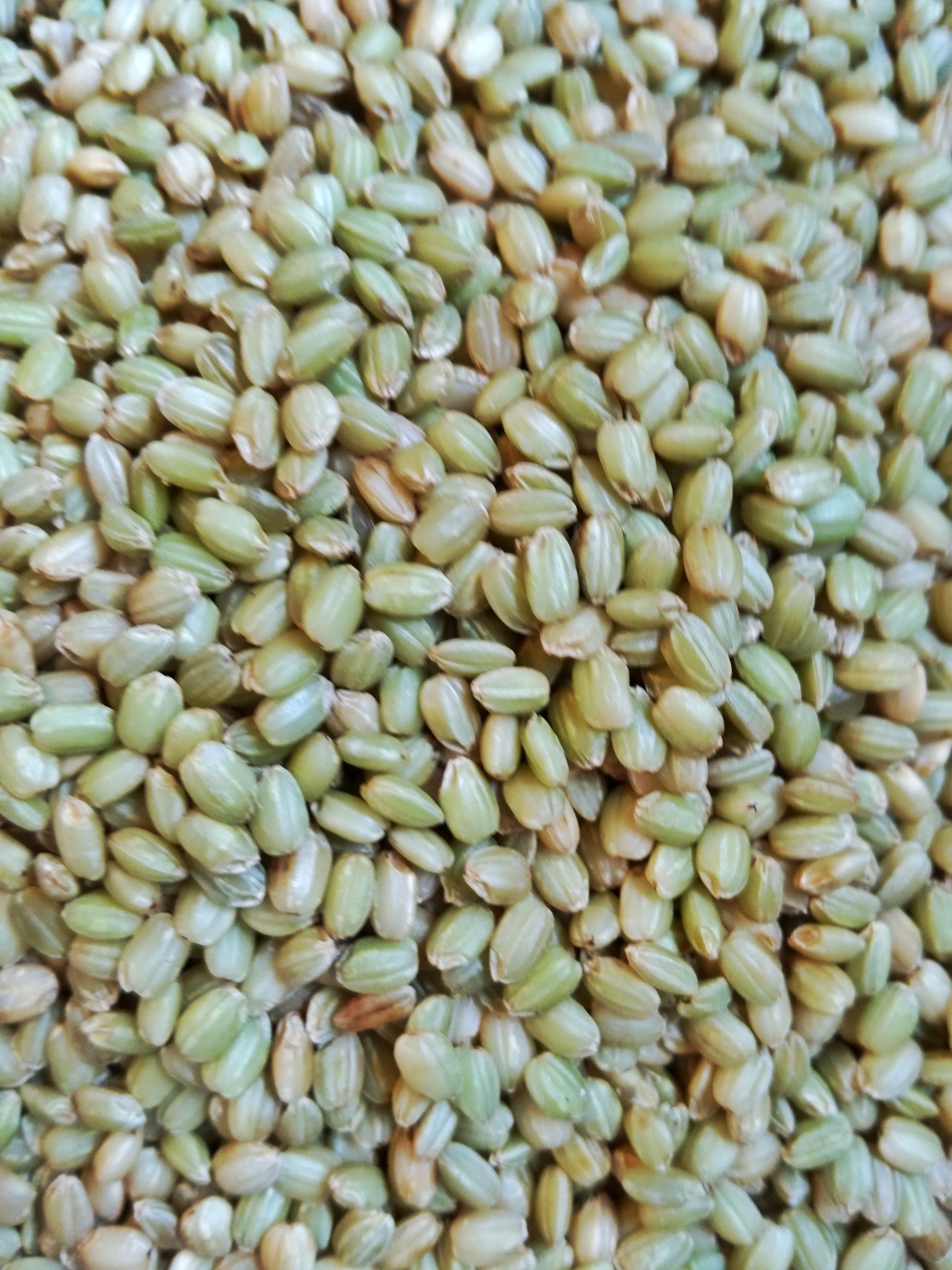
Green japonica rice

== Characteristics ==
Japonica rice grains are rounder, thicker, and harder, compared to longer, thinner, and fluffier indica rice grains. Japonica rice is also stickier due to the higher content of amylopectin, whereas indica rice starch consists of less amylopectin and more amylose. Japonica rice plants are shorter than indica rice plants.

=== Genetics ===
Temperate japonica has a large amount of waxy protein and a low amount of the non-waxy type. Non-waxy rice proteins are produced by four alleles, each producing one of four protein subtypes. Temperate japonica is the only source of Type III, shares Type IV with only tropical japonica ("javanica"), and lacks Type I and Type II.

== Cultivars ==
- Arborio rice
- Bhutanese red rice
- Bomba rice
- Calrose rice
- Carnaroli
- Koshihikari
- Vialone Nano
- Yamada Nishiki

== See also ==
- Japanese rice
