= Pandanus paste =

Dried fruit preserve common in Micronesia

- Alternative names: Edongo, jããnkun, mokwan, sehnikun in kipar, te tuae
- Type: Fruit preserve
- Place of origin: Micronesia
- Region or state: Federated States of Micronesia, Kiribati, Marshall Islands, Nauru
- Main ingredients: Pandanus fruit

Pandanus paste is a dried fruit preserve made from the fruit of Pandanus tectorius, most commonly found in the low-lying atoll islands of Micronesia. In the harsh climate of the atoll islands, pandanus fruit serve as an important staple food, and numerous methods were created to preserve them. The preserved paste was known as edongo in Nauru, jããnkun or mokwan in the Marshall Islands, sehnikun in kipar in the Federated States of Micronesia and te tuae in Kiribati.

== Preparation ==
Ripe pandanus fruits are harvested and cooked for a long period of time in an earth oven. The cooked fruit is then crushed and scraped to extract the pulp and thinly layered on leaves to dry out in the sun for several days, turning over occasionally to ensure an even drying process. Once dried, the paste is cut, rolled and tightly wrapped in pandanus leaves, which are then tied. The paste has a flavour resembling dried dates or figs and is often mixed with coconut cream to create various foodstuffs. Dried pandanus paste is rich in vitamin A, containing more beta-carotene than raw or cooked pandanus fruits.

Pandanus paste can further be dried out in an earth oven and pounded to create a flour, which is mixed with water to create a drink. The flour is known as ekareba in Nauru and te kabubu in Kiribati.
