= Calrose rice =

Medium grain rice cultivar

Calrose
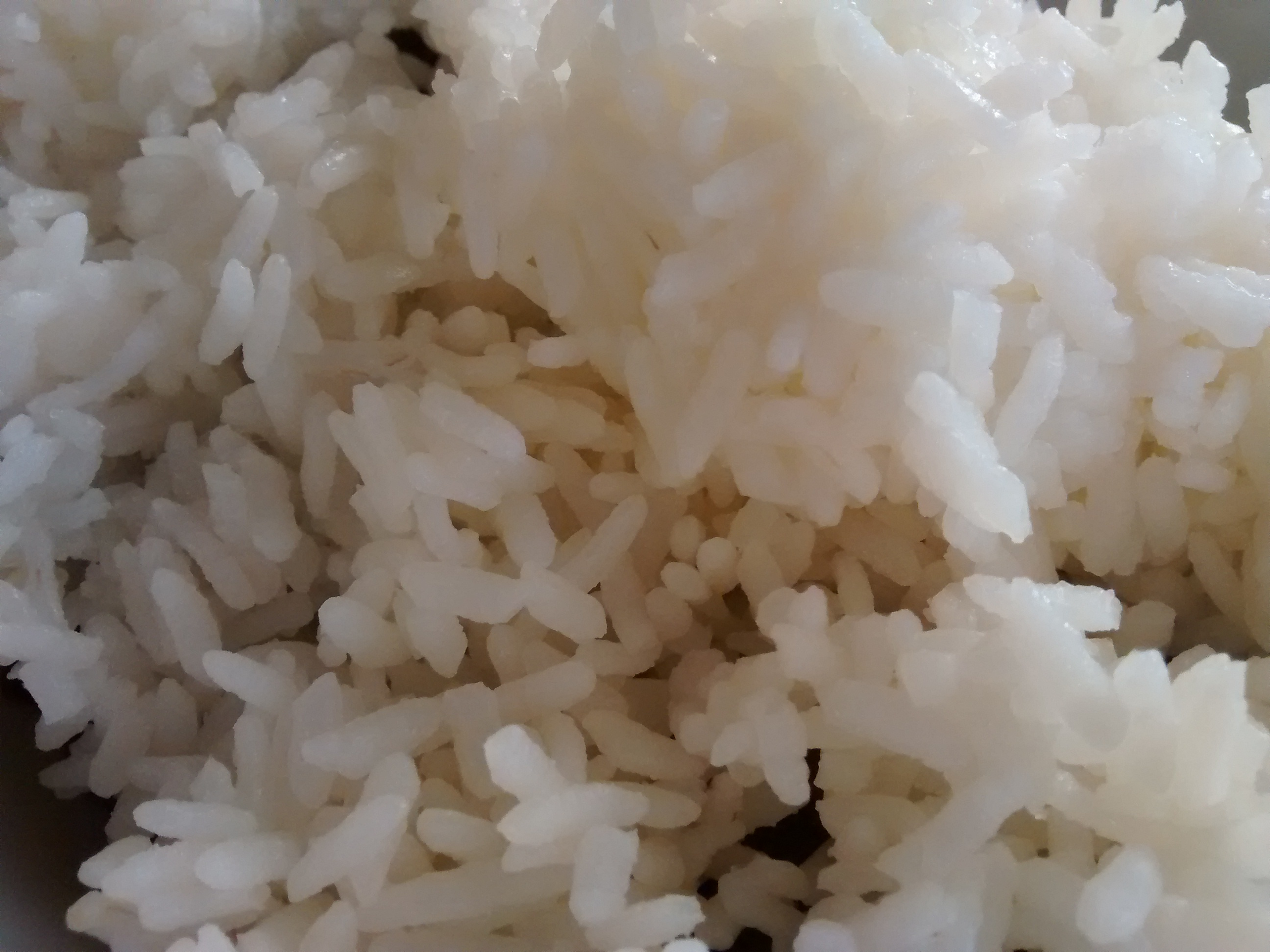
- Species: Oryza sativa
- Hybrid parentage: 'Caloro' × 'Calady'
- Subspecies: O. s. subsp. japonica
- Cultivar group: Temperate japonica
- Origin: United States 1948

Calrose is a medium grain rice variety, notable for being the founding variety of the California rice industry.

== History ==
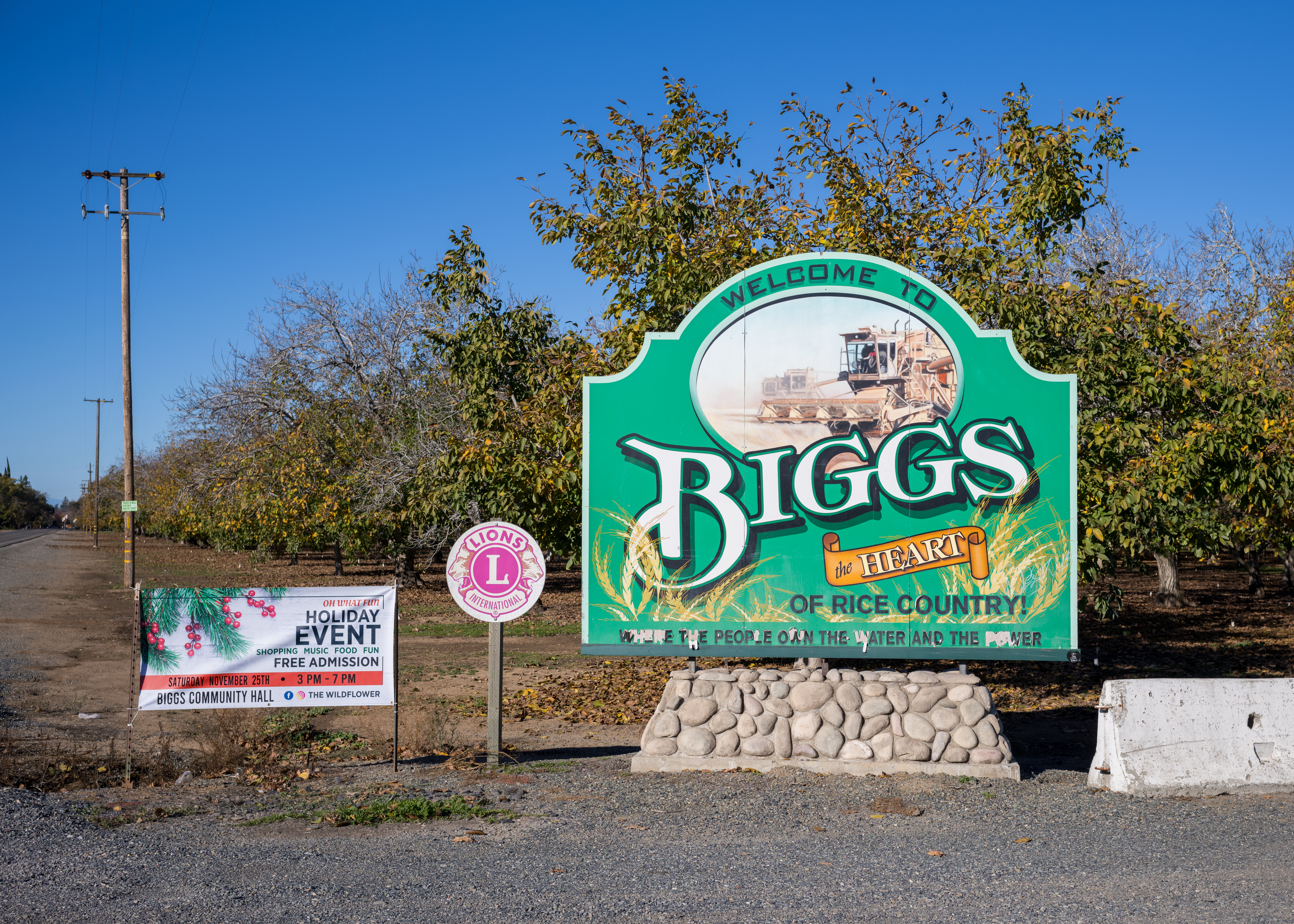
Sign in Biggs, California, stating it is "the heart of rice country"

Calrose (USDA # C.I. 8988) originated from and was developed at the Rice Experiment Station near Biggs, California, and released to California growers in 1948. It grew in popularity with growers, marketers, and consumers to become the prominent rice variety in California until the late 1970s. Specific processing and cooking properties were associated with Calrose.

Over the years, improved new varieties of Calrose grain cooking and processing characteristics were released. These medium-sized grains were commingled with Calrose in storage, and later replaced the variety in commercial production, due to their superior performance at many levels. Although that variety of Calrose is no longer grown, Calrose has become a name recognized both in trade and the marketplace for the California-type, medium-grain rice. The name "rose" indicates its medium-grain shape ("Blue Rose" is an earlier medium-grain developed in Louisiana), and "Cal" pays homage to California, the state of the grain’s origin and production. Eighty percent of the California rice crop is Calrose rice.

== Availability ==
Calrose rice is the most recognized variety of California rice in the United States and abroad, especially in the Pacific. The variety is grown in other areas of the world where growing conditions are suitable, such as Australia.

After cooking, Calrose rice grains are soft and stick together, making it good for use in sushi.

Calrose was once a much sought-after variety in Korea, where it was considered exotic. There was even a black market for the variety, and it was smuggled in large quantities.

== Millers/marketers ==
The following are the top suppliers of Calrose Rice:

- SunWest Foods
- ADM Inc.
- California Family Foods
- American Commodity Company
- Farmers' Rice Cooperative
- Pacific International Rice Mills
- Far West Rice
- SunFoods/Hinode Rice
- Sun Valley Rice
- California Heritage Rice Mills
- Lundberg Family Farms
- Polit Farms Inc
