= Pusa Basmati 1121 =

Basmati rice variety

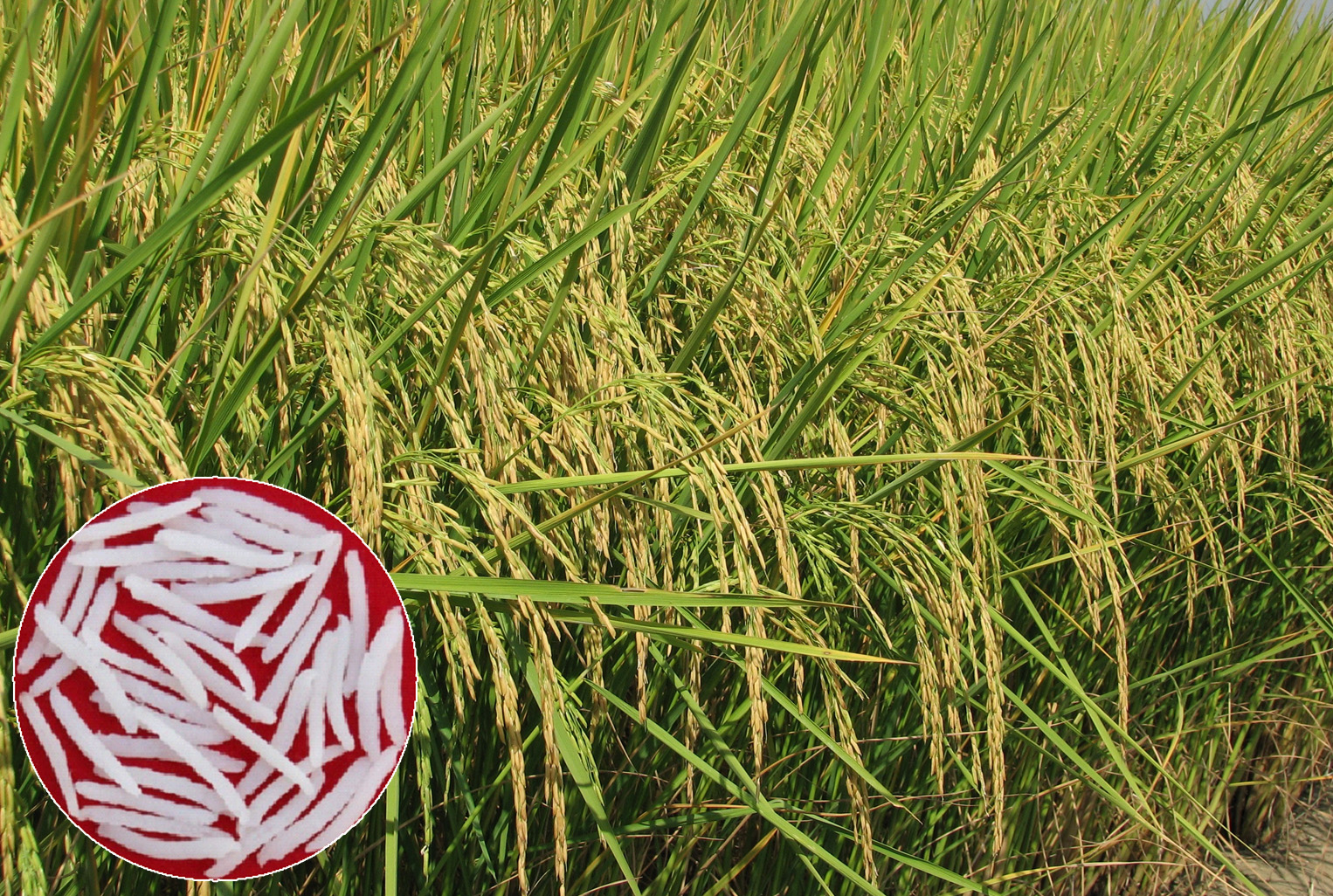
Field view of Pusa Basmati 1121. Cooked grains are shown inset

Pusa Basmati 1121 is an independently derived Basmati rice variety, evolved through the process of hybridization over a long breeding process. This variety of basmati rice was developed by Padma Shri awardee Dr Vijaipal Singh at Indian Agricultural Research Institute (IARI), New Delhi. It was released for commercial cultivation in Kharif season of 2003 as Pusa 1121 (Pusa Sugandh 4). By 2007, the variety has become widely popular with farmers, and was renamed as Pusa Basmati 1121 in 2008. It holds the world record for highest kernel elongation on cooking.

== Breeding history ==
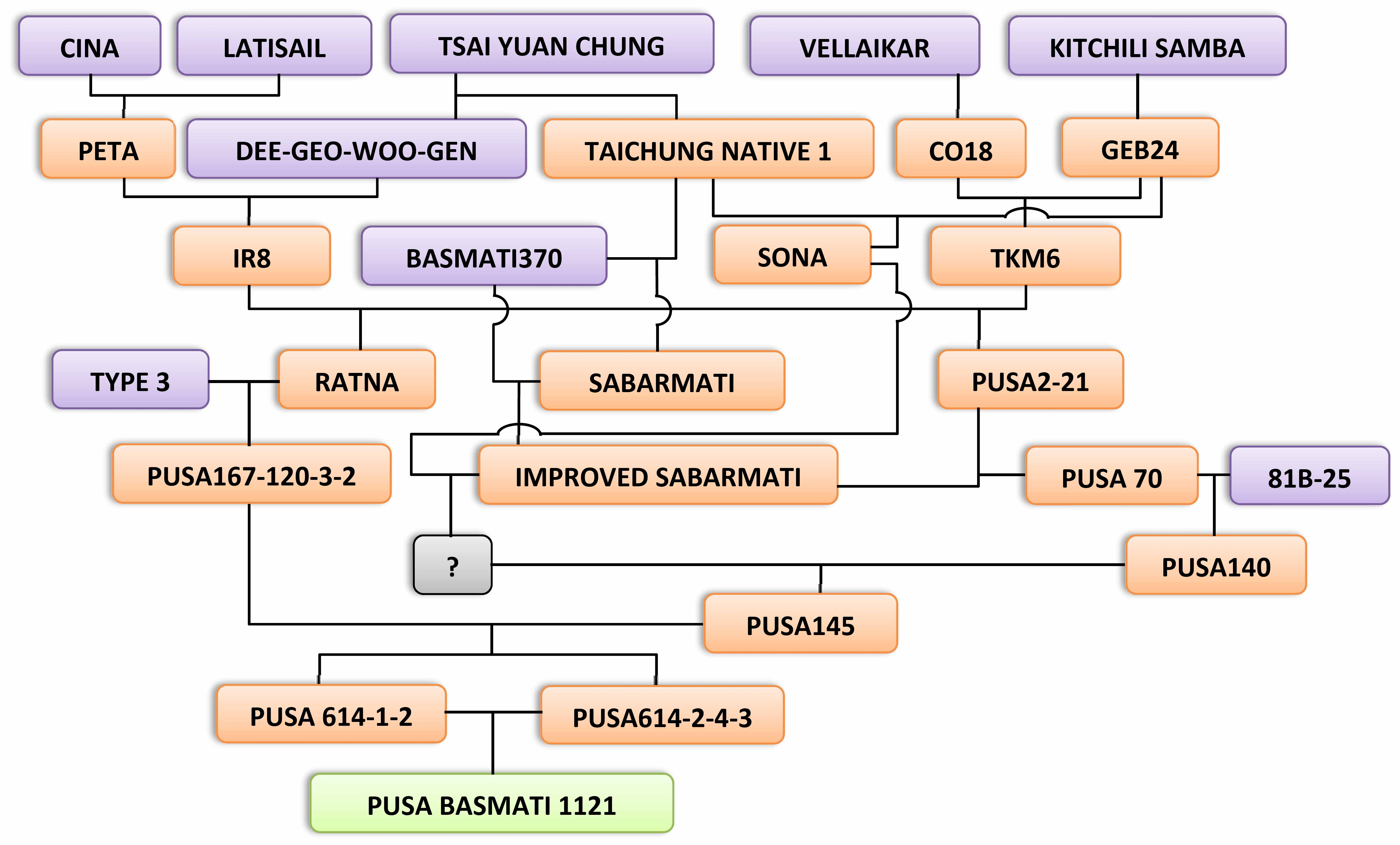
Pedigree of Pusa Basmati 1121

During the 1990s Indian Agricultural Research Institute was actively pursuing the Basmati varietal development programme with several hybridisations under evaluation. One among these was a cross, Pusa 614 derived from several intermediate crosses made between Basmati 370 and Type 3, two traditional cultivars. With the objective of improving grain length and linear cooked kernel elongation among the progenies of Pusa 614, another hybridisation was done using two sister lines, Pusa 614–1-2 and Pusa 614–2–4-3. Selections made during Kharif 1992, from the F2 population of this cross, resulted in one line that showed exceptionally long milled rice kernels and high linear cooked kernel elongation. Further selections in the ensuing generations resulted in a superior line, Pusa 1121–92–8-13-3. It was evaluated with the number IET 18004 in the National Basmati Trials under the All India Coordinated Rice Improvement Project in 2002. The variety was identified for release for commercial cultivation in 2003 as Pusa 1121 (Pusa Sugandh 4) and notified vide Gazette of India S.O. 1566(E) dated 5 November 2005 by the Ministry of Agriculture, Government of India. Initially it was released for the national capital region of Delhi. Following the redefinition of Basmati, the cultivar was renamed as Pusa Basmati 1121 and released for the states of Punjab and Haryana in 2008, vide gazette notification no. S.O. 2547(E), dated 29 October 2008.

== Special features ==
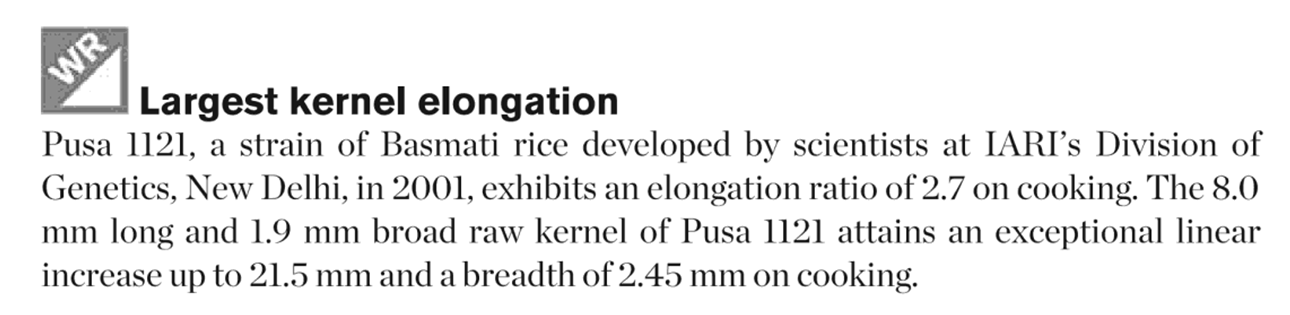
The entry showing the world record for Pusa Basmati 1121 in the 2018 Edition of Limca Book of Records

Pusa Basmati 1121 is a photo-insensitive cultivar, that yields 19–20 quintals of paddy per acre as compared to 9–10 quintals for traditional tall basmati. It requires relatively less water and matures earlier than traditional Basmati cultivars. Well known for its extraordinary kernel (grain) length, which can be as much as 9 millimetres (0.35 in) for a single grain, Pusa Basmati 1121 has very high kernel elongation ratio ranging from 2 to 2.5. Kernel elongation ratio is calculated as the ratio between length of cooked rice kernel and length of uncooked milled kernel. When cooked, the rice does not turn sticky, and possesses minimum breadth-wise expansion. Cooked rice is aromatic and has a fluffy white appearance. The grains have alkali-spreading value of 7.0 and intermediate amylose content of 22%.

As per Limca Book of Records of 2018, Pusa Basmati 1121 holds the world record for longest kernel elongation of cooking, that is 2.7 times of the raw kernel attaining a cooked length of 21.5mm.

== Popularity and international trade ==
As of 2019, Pusa Basmati 1121 had spread over 69% of the total basmati area in Punjab, 35% in Western Uttar Pradesh, 46% in Haryana, 24% in Uttarakhand, 14% in Jammu and Kashmir and 20% in the hill state of Himachal Pradesh. Because of its immense popularity across the world, Pusa Basmati 1121 is an important export commodity. Its export has enhanced India's annual basmati foreign exchange earning from ₹50000 million in 2009 to ₹264165.382 million (US$3,540.4 million) in 2021–22 Pusa 1121 has major export share of ~70%. Pusa Basmati 1121 is widely recognised as the world's longest grain rice and is grown and traded widely in the neighbouring Pakistan.

== Modified varieties ==
Pusa Basmati 1121 is susceptible to major rice diseases such as bacterial blight and blast disease. It also has poor weed competitiveness. Improved essentially derived varieties of Pusa Basmati 1121 to address its weaknesses were developed and released by Indian Agricultural Research Institute, New Delhi recently. All these varieties are near isogeneic lines of Pusa Basmati 1121 developed through marker assisted backcross breeding and show total agronomic similarity to Pusa Basmati 1121, coupled with its superior grain quality.

=== Pusa Basmati 1718 (IET 24565) ===
Pusa Basmati 1718 (PB 1718-14-2-150) is a bacterial blight resistant variety, possessing two resistant genes for bacterial blight namely, xa13 and Xa21. It is released and notified for the Basmati growing states of Punjab, Haryana and Delhi by the Govt. of India Gazette notification no. S.O.2805(E) dated 25.08.2017. It has a seed-to-seed maturity of 136–138 days and produces an average yield of 4.64 t/ ha but has shown potential to yield up to 6.04 t/ha. It has shown high resistant to bacterial blight disease on cultivation, and significantly reducing the use of streptocyclin, an antibiotic formulation used to control Xanthomonas oryzae pv. oryzae.

=== Pusa Basmati 1885 (IET 28807) ===
Pusa Basmati 1885 (Pusa 1885-13-125-20-6) is a dual disease resistant version of Pusa Basmati 1121 carrying two resistant genes, xa13 and Xa21, for bacterial blight; and two resistant genes, Pi54 and Pi2, for blast. At field level, Pusa Basmati 1885 has shown high level of resistance to both the diseases with 5.5% yield superiority over Pusa Basmati 1121. It has a seed-to-seed maturity of 135–140 days and average yield of 4.68 t/ ha. This variety it has been released and notified by Government of India Gazette notification S.O. 8(E) dated 24 December 2021 for cultivation in the Basmati growing regions of the Delhi-NCR, Haryana and Punjab.

=== Pusa Basmati 1979 (IET 28812) ===
Pusa Basmati 1979 (Pusa 1979-14-7-33-99-66) is a non-GM herbicide tolerant Basmati rice variety suitable for dry direct seeded rice (DSR) cultivation. The variety shows complete tolerance to the spraying of Imazethapyr, an herbicide that kills all the common garden land weeds. Owing to this character, Pusa Basmati 1979 is ideal for DSR cultivation, wherein weed competition is a major problem. It possesses a mutant allele of AHAS gene. It is released and notified by the Government of India Gazette notification S.O. 8(E) dated 24 December 2021.
