= Glen Moreno =

American businessman (born 1943)

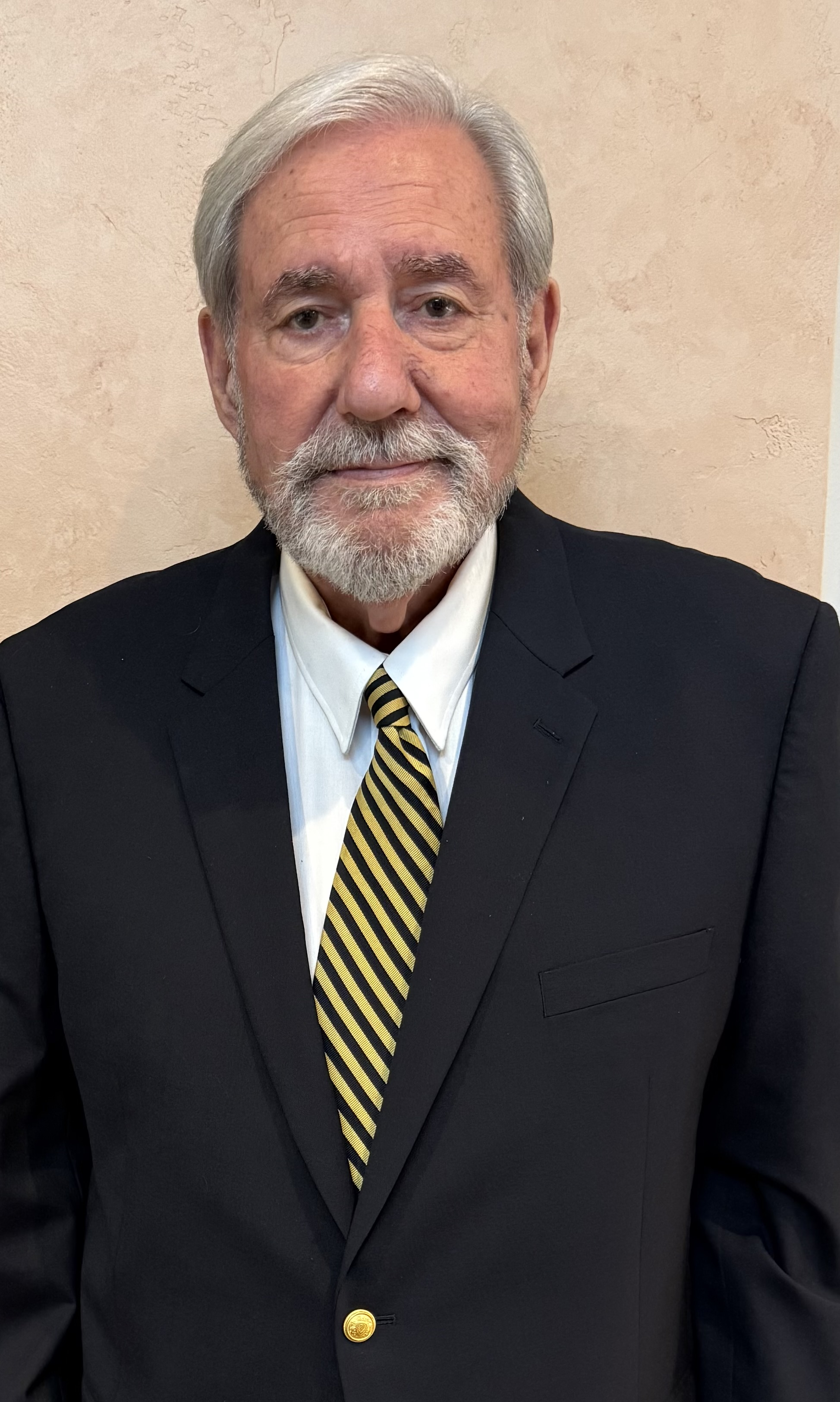
- Moreno in 2026
- Born: 24 July 1943 (age 83); California, United States
- Education: Stanford University; University of Delhi; Harvard Law School

Glen Richard Moreno (born 24 July 1943) is an American lawyer, banker, and corporate director. He is known for his international banking career with Citigroup, where he held senior executive positions in Europe, Australia, and Asia before serving on the company's policy committee. He then became president of Fidelity International and later served as chairman or director of numerous financial and media organizations, including Pearson plc, Virgin Money, Man Group, and the Financial Reporting Council.

He has also held board and advisory roles with Lloyds Banking Group, UK Financial Investments (UKFI), HSBC, Grupo PRISA, and CPC Pastoral, Australia’s largest private cattle company.

In addition to his corporate career, Moreno has been involved in public service and nonprofit organizations. During the mid-1990s he served as disaster recovery commissioner for Madison County, Virginia, following severe flooding, and has since participated in several educational, cultural, and governance organizations, including Chairmen's Mentoring International, the Ditchley Foundation, and the Royal Academy of Dramatic Art. Throughout his career he has worked across North America, Europe, Asia, and Australia in banking, investment management, education, publishing, and corporate governance.

== Early life ==
Moreno was born on July 24, 1943, in San Jose, California, where he grew up in a farming family in what later became Silicon Valley. During his youth he worked on family orchards and vineyards and attended local public schools. As a secondary school student, he spent a year in Austria as an exchange student, where he became fluent in German, an experience that later proved valuable during his banking career. He attended Stanford University on scholarship, graduating with a Bachelor of Arts with distinction in 1965. During his undergraduate studies he also spent a year studying in France through Stanford's overseas program, further developing his interest in international affairs and languages. After graduation he received a Rotary Foundation Fellowship to study at the University of Delhi in India, where he travelled extensively, speaking to Rotary clubs throughout the country. Returning to the United States, Moreno enrolled at Harvard Law School, earning a Juris Doctor degree in 1969. While at Harvard he supplemented his legal education with courses in international business management and finance at Harvard Business School and participated in seminars on international affairs at the Harvard Kennedy School. His education reflected an early interest in international business, finance, and public policy that would shape his subsequent banking career. Moreno is fluent in German and French and has conversational knowledge of Spanish.

== Career ==
=== Citibank ===
Following his graduation from Harvard Law School in 1969, Moreno joined Citibank's executive training program in New York. After completing the bank's management training, he was transferred to Frankfurt, West Germany, at the end of 1969, beginning an international career that would span nearly two decades. During his early years with the bank he worked in corporate banking and credit management before relocating to Düsseldorf, where he assumed increasing managerial responsibility within Citibank's German operations.

During the 1970s, Moreno was appointed head of Citibank's largest corporate banking branch in Germany and later became country head for Germany. In that capacity he oversaw one of Citigroup's largest overseas operations, managing relationships with major German industrial companies and financial institutions. He also led negotiations for Citibank's acquisition of Kundenkreditbank (KKB), then the company's largest international banking acquisition, and subsequently served as a partner of KKB and vice chairman of Trinkaus & Burkhardt, a private and merchant banking institution. In late 1976 Moreno was transferred to Australia as country head to oversee the restructuring of Citigroup's Australian finance operations. At the time, Citibank held a significant interest in Industrial Acceptance Corporation (IAC), whose extensive real estate lending portfolio had come under financial pressure. Moreno directed a comprehensive restructuring that included a full takeover by Citigroup, substantial asset write-downs, and the reorganization of the business. Following the restructuring, the company was renamed Citicorp Australia, where Moreno served as chairman. The turnaround became one of Citigroup's most significant restructuring projects in the Asia-Pacific region during the period.

In 1980 Moreno relocated to Singapore after being promoted to head Citigroup's Australasia, Southeast Asia, and India division. Based in Singapore, he was responsible for banking operations extending from New Zealand and Australia through Southeast Asia to the Indian subcontinent, overseeing regional business development and executive management across multiple markets. In 1981 he was promoted to London as senior officer for Europe and became a member of Citigroup's policy committee, the bank's principal executive decision-making body. His responsibilities expanded to include operations across Europe, the Middle East, South Africa,and other international markets. During this period he also served as a director of Grindlays Bank and represented Citigroup in discussions with governments, regulators, central banks, and multinational corporate clients throughout the region. After approximately eighteen years with Citigroup, Moreno left the company in 1987 to become president of Fidelity International. His departure marked the conclusion of an international banking career that had included executive leadership positions in Europe, Australia, and Asia and established his reputation as an international banking executive with expertise in corporate restructuring, international finance, and cross-border management.

=== Fidelity International ===
Fidelity International In 1987, Moreno left Citigroup after eighteen years to become president of Fidelity International, the international investment management business of Fidelity Investments.

His appointment coincided with the global stock market crash of October 1987, requiring the company to undertake a period of operational restructuring and strategic realignment. During his tenure, Fidelity International expanded its presence across Europe and Asia, strengthened its position in the United Kingdom investment market, introduced a global range of investment funds based in Luxembourg, and established an operations centre in India that later became one of the company's largest international facilities. After serving as president until 1991, Moreno retired from executive management but remained associated with the company as a director of Fidelity International. He also served as chairman of The Taiwan Fund and The Indonesia Capital Fund and as a director of The India Fund, reflecting his continuing involvement in international investment management and Asian financial markets. His long-standing service with Fidelity continued through subsequent decades as a member of its board and associated investment businesses.

=== Farming and public service ===
Following his retirement from executive management, Moreno returned to the United States and established a cattle and wine-producing farm in Madison County, Virginia. Over the following years he expanded the property into a working agricultural enterprise comprising an Angus cattle breeding operation, vineyards, and a winery. During 1995 and 1966, following severe flooding in Madison County, Moreno served as disaster recovery commissioner, coordinating local recovery efforts following what was described as a 5,000 year flood event. The role represented his principal public service appointment during is years as a farmer and reflected his involvement in local community development efforts. During this period he declined several offers to return to executive leadership, choosing instead to focus on farming while selectively accepting non-executive directorships. Moreno continued to develop a portfolio of international board appointments, laying the foundation for his later return to full-time corporate governance roles in the United Kingdom and Europe..In 1994, Moreno joined the board of Man Group plc as senior independent director, a position he held until 2009. He subsequently became a trustee of the Prince of Liechtenstein Foundation and LGT Group, serving from 1999 to 2008 in connection with the foundation's banking and wealth management activities. His experience in banking, investment management, media, agriculture and public service contributed to his subsequent appointments as chairman and director of several multinational companies and public institutions. Moreno returned to London and full time board activity in 2005, lured by an offer to chair Pearson plc, the media group which published “my favorite newspaper (the Financial Times), my favorite magazine (the Economist) and my favorite books (Penguin).” He served as chair for 10 years and accepted a variety of corporate directorships and UK public service appointments. During the 2010s, Moreno was active in initiatives promoting greater gender diversity in corporate governance. He supported efforts to increase the representation of women on corporate boards through organizations including the 30% Club, Women on Boards, and the Professional Boards Forum. After serving as chairman of several major companies and holding a range of corporate directorships and UK public appointments, he returned to the United States in 2018.

== Personal life ==
Moreno was married to Cheryl Eschbach, a Stanford classmate, in 1966. She passed in 2014. He is currently married to Marilee Wood. The couple reside primarily on San Juan Island, Washington and spend extensive time abroad.
