= Russ's Market =

Nebraska-based grocery chain

- Russ's Market logo
- Type: Subsidiary
- Industry: Retail (Grocery)
- Founded: May 1964; 62 years ago in Lincoln, Nebraska, U.S.
- Founder: Russ Raybould; Clayton Burnett
- Headquarters: Lincoln, Nebraska, U.S.
- Number of locations: 9 (2021)
- Area served: Nebraska
- Key people: Pat Raybould (president and CEO)
- Products: Bakery, delicatessen, dairy, grocery, frozen foods, organic foods, bulk foods, meat, produce, seafood, wine, beer, spirits, floral products, pet supplies, general merchandise, prepared foods, coffee
- Revenue: ▲$2 million (2020)
- Number of employees: ~100 (2021)
- Parent: B&R Stores, Inc.
- Website: russmarket.com

Russ's Market is a Nebraska-based grocery chain that operates stores in the communities of Lincoln and Hastings. Russ's Market is owned by B&R Stores, Inc., a Nebraska corporation.

== History ==
Russ Raybould and Clayton Burnett, two former Safeway employees, founded the company in May, 1964 when they acquired a small neighborhood grocery store together at 17th and Washington Streets in south Lincoln, Nebraska. Raybould eventually purchased the interest of Burnett's and today B&R Stores, Inc. in Lincoln, Nebraska.

Today, Russ's Market has stores in Lincoln and Hastings, and one in Glenwood, Iowa. Russ's son, Pat Raybould, serves as president of the company. The company has been recognized by the Nebraska Department of Economic Development for its work to promote the use of reusable shopping bags. In addition to operating the Russ's Market stores, B&R Stores, Inc. operates ten Super Saver stores in Nebraska and western Iowa, Save Best in Lincoln and the Grand Central Apple Market in Kearney, Nebraska.

== B&R Stores ==
B&R Stores, Inc.
- Type: Private
- Industry: Restaurants
- Founded: 1964; 62 years ago
- Founder: Russ Raybould; Clayton Burnett
- Headquarters: Lincoln, Nebraska, U.S
- Number of locations: 35 (January 2024)
- Key people: Pat Raybould (president and CEO)
- Owner: Raybould family
- Number of employees: 2,000 (2019)

B&R Stores, Inc. is a supermarket operator that currently operates stores across Nebraska, Iowa, and Missouri. As of 2024, there are 35 stores across 8 banners.

=== History ===
The company was founded in 1964, the same year as Russ's Markets, by the same two founders, Russ Raybould and Clayton Burnett.

Under Raybould's direction, B&R Stores, Inc. grew significantly. Expansion occurred both through acquisitions and the development of new stores. Growth began in 1979 with the opening of a new 25,000-square-foot (2,300 m^{2}) Russ's Market at 66th and O Streets in Lincoln. Two years later the company acquired an existing store in southeast Lincoln at 33rd Street and Nebraska Parkway.

The company expanded into Hastings, Nebraska, by acquiring a store in 1984. In 1995, three Food-4-Less stores in Lincoln were acquired, becoming the company's fifth, sixth, and seventh Russ's Market stores. In 2001, B&R Stores, Inc. built a new Russ's Market at Coddington and West A Streets in Lincoln. In 2008, B&R Stores acquired the Grand Central Apple Market in Kearney.

On May 22, 2017 it was announced that B&R Stores, Inc. will acquire the Lovegrove's Grocery in Waverly, Nebraska. The store will be rebranded as a Russ's Market Express. In 2020, B&R Stores acquired Allen's in Hastings.

In 2022, B&R Stores acquired C&R Markets, a 10-store chain in Missouri. In 2023, B&R Stores acquired Mason’s Market in Minden.
