= Super saver =

Super saver may refer to:

- Super Saver (horse), winner of the 2010 Kentucky Derby
- Super Saver Foods, a former grocery store chain owned by Albertsons
- Super Saver Foods (B&R Stores), a grocery chain owned by B&R Stores
- Super Saver, a pricing game on The Price Is Right
- Super saver, a term used by advertisers
