= Vijaypal Singh =

Vijaypal Singh may refer to:

- Vijaipal Singh, Indian agricultural scientist
- Vijaypal Singh (politician)
- Vijay Pal Singh, Indian pole vaulter
