= Cuno Pümpin =

Swiss economist

- Born: 8 August 1939 (age 87); Basel, Switzerland

Academic background
- Education: University of Basel

Cuno Pümpin (born 21 August 1939) is a Swiss economist, entrepreneur and consultant. He was born in Basel, Switzerland.

== Background ==
Cuno Pümpin was the second son of Fritz Pümpin (born 1901 in Gelterkinden, died July 5, 1972, in Gelterkinden) and Rose Gerster. He is a citizen of Gelterkinden.

== Career ==
Pümpin went to primary school and high school in the Canton of Basel. In 1955 he started a three year commercial apprenticeship. Later he studied economics and management at the Universities of Basel and St. Gallen. In 1966 he received a Master's degree as a commercial teacher and in 1968 he obtained his PhD. The title of his doctoral thesis is "Long Range Marketing Planning".

== Activities ==
=== Professional ===
Between 1965 and 1967 Pümpin was employed in the Corporate Development Department of J.R. Geigy AG (today a part of Novartis). In 1967 he joined the computer company Sperry Univac (today part of Unisys) where he became Vice President of Marketing in 1970. In 1970/1971 Pümpin wrote his professorial thesis (Habilitationsschrift) entitled Information and Marketing. In 1972 he became "Privatdozent" (formal lecturer) at the University of St Gallen and in 1973 he was appointed Extraordinarius (Professor and member of the Senate). At the same time Pümpin became CEO of the Center of Management at St. Gallen, a foundation related to the University.

In 1977 Pümpin founded his own company specializing in strategy consulting. In the following years many Swiss companies with international operations became his clients. Pümpin was also appointed to many boards of directors, such as Ernst & Young Switzerland, Ems Chemie Holding AG, Liechtenstein Global Trust (LGT) AG, and Metro International, now a member of Metro Group. AG, and became a member of the international advisory board of the Blackstone Group, New York. As a member of the Prince of Liechtenstein Foundation and an executive board member of LGT, Pümpin was closely involved in the international expansion of that Group. Pümpin was also a board member of several institutes at the University of St. Gallen, and Chairman of the Institute of Management.

Since the 1970s Pümpin has been a well-known lecturer at international congresses and seminars such as the World Economic Forum, and the ISC in St. Gallen. He has also given frequent lectures in the USA, Canada, Australia, New Zealand, Japan and many other countries.

In 1985, along with two other investors, Pümpin acquired a training company with over 1,000 employees, active in almost all European countries. After restructuring the company, Pümpin and his partners sold it in 1988.

In the late 1980s Pümpin worked closely with Professor Michael Porter of Harvard University and supported him in his research on the "International Competitiveness of Nations." In this assignment, Pümpin was responsible for research into European business clusters.

In 1990 Pümpin was appointed a consultant of the Swiss Federal Council, the Executive of the Swiss Confederation. Pümpin also supported other countries such as Andorra in developing their country’s strategy.

In the late 1990s Pümpin was strongly involved in the building of Metro’s corporate venture company Invision. After a management buyout he became Vice Chairman and from 2002 till 2010 Chairman of Invision Holding AG, one of Switzerland’s leading private equity companies. Since the 1990s Pümpin has been a private investor in various companies.

=== Scientific ===
In his career as a professor Pümpin has published thirteen books and over 100 articles. His books were translated into more than 10 languages.

One of his publications was The Practice of Strategic Management (1980), which was translated into several languages with a print run of more than 200,000. Management strategischer Erfolgspositionen - SEP (1982), published in English in 1987 under the title The Essence of Corporate Strategy is considered his most important work. Pümpin defined a Strategic Excellence Position (SEP) as a "...central competence of the corporation that enables it to achieve outstanding results." Thus the concept of "Strategic Excellence Position" strongly corresponds to the well-known term of “Core Competence” by Hamel and Prahalad, or the concept of "Core Capabilities" by Stalk et al., both published in the Harvard Business Review. Thus Pümpin became a forerunner of the concept of core competences that plays a central role in today’s strategic management.

Pümpin's work enjoys international recognition. In the 1980s Ernst & Young decided to use the concept of “Strategic Excellence Positions” as a basis for their strategy consulting activities. For the development of this concept, Pümpin was honored with the Swiss Innovation Prize in 1983.

Another important book that has found broad interest is Corporate Dynamism - How World Class Companies Became World Class, of which the German version was published in 1990 and was voted the best economic book by Euromarketing. In this work Pümpin further developed his strategy concept by promoting the issue of scalability as a means to develop strengths and profitability.

In the 1990s Pümpin shifted his interests from corporate strategy to investment strategy. The result of this work was the book Strategisches Investment Management (Strategic Investment Management) published in 2008 with Maurice Pedergnana. Contrary to traditional publications on asset management that apply capital market theory, Pümpin's approach strictly builds on strategy teachings. This leads to findings that are often in strong contradiction to traditional investment management as promoted by financial institutions.

== Publications ==
- Langfristige Marketingplanung, Konzeption und Formalisierung (doctoral thesis “Dissertation” 1968, 2nd ed. 1970, 136 p.).
- Information und Marketing, Informations-Systeme als Führungsgrundlage (professorial thesis (“Habilitationsschrift”, 1973, 234 p.).
- Strategische Führung in der Unternehmungspraxis (1980, 80 p., French 1981, English 1982).
- Management strategischer Erfolgspositionen (1982, 217 p., Spanish 1982 - with S. Garcia Echevarria, title: Estrategia Empresarial - como implementar la estrategia en la empresa; English 1987: title: The Essence of Corporate Strategy; Portuguese 1987, Japanese 1987, Finnish 1989, Korean 1989, Indish Edition Mumbai 1995).
- Unternehmenskultur - Basis strategischer Profilierung erfolgreicher Unternehmen (1985, 56 p. with J.-M. Kobi und H.A. Wuethrich, French 1985; Spanish: Cultura Empresarial, 1988, 139 p. with S. Garcia Echevarria).
- The Empowered Investor - 7 Principles for Strategic Wealth Creation in a New Financial World 2014, 155 p. with Heinrich Liechtenstein, Fariba Hashemi, Brian Hashemi
- Vom Manager zum Investor - 2017, 216 p. with Marius Fuchs

== See also ==
- Strategic management
- Investment management
- World Economic Forum
- LGT Bank
- Prince of Liechtenstein Foundation
- Metro Group
- Federal Council (Switzerland)
- Andorra
- American Management Association
