= KVM =

KVM may refer to:

== Computing ==
- Kernel-based Virtual Machine, a virtualization solution that turns the Linux kernel into a hypervisor
- K virtual machine, for Java

=== Keyboard–screen–mouse ===
- KVM switch (keyboard, video, and mouse switch), originally a hardware device for controlling multiple computers, now also used to refer to software tools used to achieve similar functionality (for example Synergy and various more fully open-source equivalents)
- Rackmount KVM, a computer input/output device offering the combination of a keyboard, video monitor and mouse (pointing device), typically rack mounted

== Other ==
- K. V. Mahadevan, South Indian music composer
- Kalamazoo Valley Museum, a museum in Michigan, US
- Kheti Virasat Mission, a farmers' movement in Punjab
- Kosovo Verification Mission
- KV Mechelen, a Belgian football (soccer) club
