= 5-methyldeoxycytidine-5'-phosphate kinase =

Class of enzymes

Identifiers
- EC no.: 2.7.4.19
- CAS no.: 81032-53-3

Databases
- IntEnz: IntEnz view
- BRENDA: BRENDA entry
- ExPASy: NiceZyme view
- KEGG: KEGG entry
- MetaCyc: metabolic pathway
- PRIAM: profile
- PDB structures: RCSB PDB PDBe PDBsum
- Gene Ontology: AmiGO / QuickGO
Search
- PMC: articles
- PubMed: articles
- NCBI: proteins

5-methyldeoxycytidine-5'-phosphate kinase (EC 2.7.4.19) is an enzyme that catalyzes the chemical reaction

5-methyldeoxycytidine 5'-phosphate
ATP
ADP
ATP
ADP
5-methyldeoxycytidine diphosphate

The enzyme characterised from Xanthomonas oryzae infected with a bacteriophage converts 5-methyldeoxycytidine 5'-phosphate to 5-methyldeoxycytidine diphosphate by transferring a phosphate group from the cofactor, adenosine triphosphate (ATP), which is converted to adenosine diphosphate (ADP).

This enzyme is a transferases, specifically one transferring phosphorus-containing groups (phosphotransferases) with a phosphate group as acceptor. The systematic name of this enzyme class is ATP:5-methyldeoxycytidine-5'-phosphate phosphotransferase.
