= Jasmati =

Variety of long-grain rice

Jasmati Rice is a conventionally bred, inbred line (variety) of long grain of rice whose name is derived from jasmine rice and basmati. Jasmati is neither "genetically engineered" (as in transgenic) nor is it an F1 hybrid. It is said to possess the traits of both grains – namely the softness (when cooked) of basmati, and the nutty aroma of jasmine – the latter in muted tones so as to be more subtle.

It appears to have been first created in the United States. To what degree Jasmati is derived from its etymological parent grains is unknown and disputed. The patent for Jasmati, registered in 1993 by the Texas-based corporation, RiceTec, had legal implications for Thai and Indian farmers who rely heavily on the exports of the parent crops, and caused controversy. Presently the debate seems to have cooled down. As the degree to which Jasmati draws from Jasmine cannot be ascertained, the informed consumer should be aware that it is therefore a different grain and may or may not be a complete substitute for either Jasmine or basmati. This suggests that Jasmati may have its own unique merits as a cooking ingredient.
