= Prince of Liechtenstein Foundation =

Lichtenstein royal family owned foundation

- Company type: Private
- Industry: Venture Capital, Heritage conservation, Political foundation
- Founded: 1970
- Founder: Prince Hans-Adam II
- Headquarters: Vaduz, Liechtenstein
- Key people: Prince Philipp Erasmus (CEO and president); Prince Hans-Adam II (chairman of the board of trustees)
- Services: Investments, Personal funds, Heritage conservation, Political funding, Political endorsements
- Revenue: Confidential
- Net income: Confidential
- AUM: $6.25-7.6 billion (2011 est.)
- Owner: Princely Family of Liechtenstein
- Number of employees: 30
- Website: www.sfl.li

The Prince of Liechtenstein Foundation (German: Stiftung Fürst Liechtenstein) is a portfolio of private companies, museums, and art collections owned by the Princely Family of Liechtenstein. It is essentially a cap for a multitude of investments, such as the LGT Group, the Hofkellerei wineries, Wilfersdorf Agricultural and Forest Company, RiceTec, and real estate holdings in Vienna, Austria. As of 2012, there were 15 companies and 2 museums owned by the Foundation.

In late 2009, rumors speculated that the foundation was attempting to purchase rights to Vaduz FC. However, this has never been confirmed or denied, as of late 2012. The Foundation also plays national heritage and political roles, opening up a Liechtenstein culture museum, selling the political books that support the princely family, and funding right-leaning politicians.

== Overview ==
The foundation is a Vaduz-based establishment, created in 1970, to manage assets of the Princely Portfolio. Prince Hans-Adam II was head of the foundation from 1970 through 1984, until his brother Prince Philipp Erasmus succeeded him as CEO, Prince Philipp was also the CEO for LGT Group, before being replaced by his nephew Prince Maximilian in 2006. Before becoming CEO, Prince Philipp was a well-known hedge fund investor, working at the head of many influential investment firms. However, Prince Hans-Adam II is still the main beneficiary of the foundation at the present time.

The chairman of Pearson PLC, Glen Moreno, is on the board of trustees at the foundation and also LGT Group. Cuno Pümpin is the chairman of the board of directors at Invision Private Equity AG; he is also a member of the board of trustees at the foundation and LGT Group.

== List of companies ==
Here is a list of all foundation companies; they are:

- Forestry Kalwang
- Hofkellerei Vaduz
- Hofkellerei Wilfersdorf
- LGT Group
- Liechtenstein Energie GmbH & Co KG
- LIECO GmbH & KG
- Palais Liechtenstein GmbH
- Real Estate Administration Vienna
- RiceTec
- Van Eck Publishers
- Wilfersdorf Agricultural and Forest Company

== Museums ==
Here is a list of all Foundation museums, they are:

- Liechtenstein Royal Museum
- Liechtenstein Museum
- Liechtenstein Museum of Fine Arts (Art exhibit only)
