= Fritz Puempin =

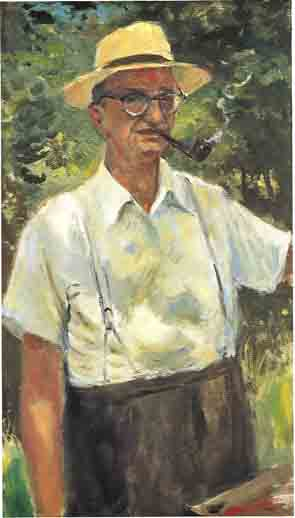

Fritz Pümpin (March 29, 1901 in Gelterkinden, Switzerland – July 5, 1972 same place) was a Swiss painter and archaeologist.

== Life ==
Even as a boy Fritz Pümpin has been a keen graphic artist. In 1916/17 he studied drawing and painting with the well known Swiss painter Janet in Colombier, Switzerland. He continued his education as an artist at the school of arts in Basle, Switzerland. His parents decided that he should become a business man in order to take over his father's wine business which he did in 1929. This job, however, did not satisfy him and, after marrying in 1936 he and his wife decided to embark on a full-time artistic career.

He now also engaged in his hobby, archaeology and he became well known for his discoveries and descriptions of Germanic, Roman, Celtic and Neolithic stations in Northwestern Switzerland. For his merits he became a member of the commission of antiquities of the Canton of Baselland.

During World War II he was a soldier in the Swiss army and was ordered by his superiors to record with pencil and paint brush special historical events. Thus, fascinating and historically valuable sketches and paintings of wartime events along the Swiss border were generated. Paintings of the Red Cross organized transfer of French children to neutral Switzerland, of the arrival of French and American troops at the Swiss border and sketches of the erroneous bombardment of Basle in 1945 are especially singled out.

From 1945 to 1972 - interrupted by various voyages to France, Italy, Spain and Holland - Fritz Pümpin has painted in his beloved Jura area of Northwestern Switzerland. His main subjects were landscapes and villages. He has succeeded in over fifty years of work to capture his homeland with convincing strokes of his paintbrush in his post-impressionist style. Portraits, "nature morts", drawings and paintings from his voyages abroad, from his military service and from his archaeological excavations enrich his work.

== Literature ==
=== Painter ===
- Suter, P., Jenne, M., Frey M., "Fritz Pümpin". Eigenverlag R.Pümpin, 1975
- Frey Max, Baselbieter Heimatbuch, Bd.12. Fritz Pümpin-Gerster, 5.324 f
- Leonhardt H., Ausstellungskatalog der Fritz-Pümpin- Jubiläumsausstellung in Gelterkinden 1971
- Gysin Hans, Am Mühlibach. Literaturkommission Baselland, 3. Auflage, 1973.
- Schreiber E., Spitzbuebe, 1950
- Exhibition Guide: Exposition Fritz Pümpin at his 60th anniversary, Ebenrain Castle Sissach 1961. Introduction by Dr. A. Bader, Basle

=== Chronicler ===
- "Kunstblätter aus der Grenzbesetzung 1939-40", von Kunstmaler Fritz Pümpin, Schwitter AG, Basel, 1940
- "Aus nächster Nähe.....", skizziert von Soldatenmaler Fritz Pümpin, Schwitter AG, Basel Zürich, 1945
- "Vaterland nur Dir", Kunstbeilagen Fritz Pümpin, Schwitter AG, Basel, Zürich, 1942
- "Die Schweiz in Waffen", Vaterländischer Verlag, Murten, 1945

=== Archaeologist ===
- Nah dran, weit weg, Geschichte des Kantons Basel-Landschaft, Ewald, J. et al. 2001, Verlag des Kantons Basel-Landschaft
- Grabung "Teufelsküche", Bronze- bis Hallstadtzeit, JB
- Grabung Wenslinger "Egg", Mittlere Bronzezeit, JB
- Grabung "Eifeld" bei Gelterkinden, Hallstadtzeit, JB
- Grabungen "Burgenrain" bei Sissach, Hallstadtzeit, JB
- Töpfersiedlung "Im vordern Brühl" Sissach, Latènezeit, JB
- Hüttensiedlung "Sissacher Fluh", späte Bronzezeit und Mittelalterliche Fluchtburg, JB
- Grabung "Zeughaus" Gelterkinden, Latènezeit, JB
- Alemannengräber in Eptingen und Ormalingen, JB
- Grabung "Mühlstett" bei Gelterkinden, römischer Gutshof, JB
- Verschiedene Beobachtungen

== See also ==
- Cuno Pümpin, son of Fritz Pümpin
