= RiceTec =

American hybrid rice seed company based in Alvin, Texas

RiceTec Inc.
- Type: Private
- Industry: Agribusiness
- Predecessor: Farms of Texas Company
- Founded: 1990
- Headquarters: Alvin, Texas, United States
- Key people: Karsten Neuffer (CEO),
- Products: Hybrid Seed Rice, Consumer Rice
- Number of employees: ~250
- Website: www.ricetec.com

RiceTec Inc. is a private American company based and headquartered in Alvin, Texas, that develops and produces hybrid rice seed for the American and various international markets. RiceTec previously owned the consumer brand name RiceSelect which markets Texmati brand rice in grocery stores throughout North America. The company was founded in 1990 as a foreign for profit corporation and is owned by the Prince of Liechtenstein Foundation.

== Hybrid seed rice ==
Development of hybrid rice began in the United States in 1980, as a partnership between the China National Seed Corporation and Ring Around Seed Corporation. These early attempts at growing hybrid rice were met with limited success due to problems in production and grain characteristics. In 1986 Farms of Texas Co. (at the time a large corporate farm) became part of the partnership to help develop better production practices and further research. Farms of Texas Co. was re-formed as RiceTec Inc. in 1990 and formed a partnership with the Chinese National Hybrid Rice Research Center in 1993 to provide RiceTec with exclusive access to Chinese germplasm. RiceTec marketed its first commercial hybrid rice line in 2000, with the introduction of the Hybrid XL6, followed shortly by XL7 and XL8 in 2002. RiceTec introduced its first Newpath Herbicide resistant rice (in a partnership with BASF) known as Clearfield XL8 in 2003.

== Litigation ==
=== Basmati patent controversy ===
RiceTec became widely known in the late 1990s due to an attempt by the company to patent Basmati rice. Basmati rice has historically been grown in Pakistan and India for many centuries, however neither country had ever patented the particular variety of rice. The claiming of the patent by RiceTec angered many farmers, officials, and NGOs in the region because of this act of theft of intellectual property and vowed to fight the patent, especially since the information provided to Ricetec largely came from the basmati seeds at the International Rice Research Institute in the Philippines. They allowed for duplicate germplasms to be stored in a seed bank in Fort Collins, Colorado.

The patent was originally accepted by the US Patent & Trademark Office in 1997, but was officially challenged by the Indian government in 2000 and most patent claims were overturned in the US in 2002. Despite this, RiceTec continues to market their "Texmati" brand of rice as "long grain American Basmati", although no patents or trademarks on the title "Basmati" are currently held by the company (a current trademark is however held for "Texmati".)

=== Seed quality lawsuit ===
A countersuit (in response to a suit filed by RiceTec for non-payment) was filed against RiceTec on July 6, 2012, in Green County, Arkansas, by Scott Meredith, a rice farmer from Green County. The suit alleged that Meredith had been sold both impure and defective seeds by RiceTec, and also accused RiceTec of negligence, breach of contract, breach of warranty, and violating the Arkansas Deceptive Trade Practices Act for misrepresenting and mislabeling its seeds. According to the lead attorney for the plaintiff, the hybrid seed rice he (Scott Meredith) purchased had inferior milling characteristics that hurt marketability and did not yield as was promised by the company. The case received widespread attention in the rice producing areas of the United States and prompted RiceTec CEO John Nelsen to issue a statement rebuffing all allegations and promising to fight the lawsuit. In November 2012, a judge dismissed the claim against RiceTec.

== See also ==
- Basmati
- Biological patent
- Henry Beachell
- Jasmati
- Navdhanya
- Prince of Liechtenstein Foundation
