= Vijaipal Singh =

Indian scientist (born 1945)

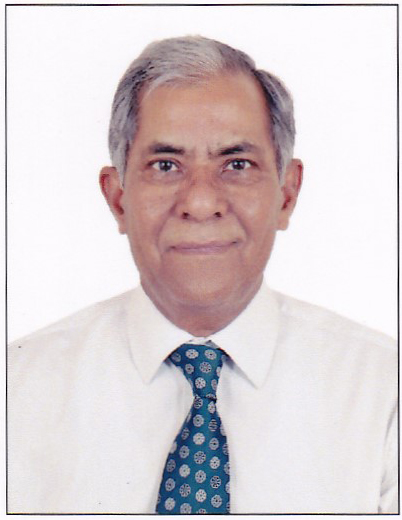
- Born: 17 Janualry 1945; Narsan Kalan, Haridwar District of Uttarakhand State, India
- Education: Agra University
- Known for: Pusa Basmati 1121 rice variety
- Awards: Padma Shri
- Scientific career
- Fields: Genetics and Plant Breeding
- Workplaces: Indian Agricultural Research Institute, New Delhi

Vijaipal Singh (born 17 January 1945) in Narsan Kalan, Haridwar District of Uttarakhand State, India is an Agricultural scientist associated with the Indian Council of Agricultural Research (ICAR) and is known for his contributions to the science of rice genetics and breeding. He is well known for his contributions in developing the most popular Basmati rice variety, Pusa Basmati 1121. A post graduate and a doctoral degree (PhD) holder in Agriculture Botany from Agra University, he started his career as a research assistant at the Indian Agricultural Research Institute (IARI), New Delhi in 1968 and retired as a professor at the Division of Genetics, IARI. Singh is credited with several articles published in peer reviewed journals. In recognition of his services to the nation, he was honored by the Government of India, in 2012, with the fourth highest Indian civilian award of Padma Shri.

== Awards and honors ==
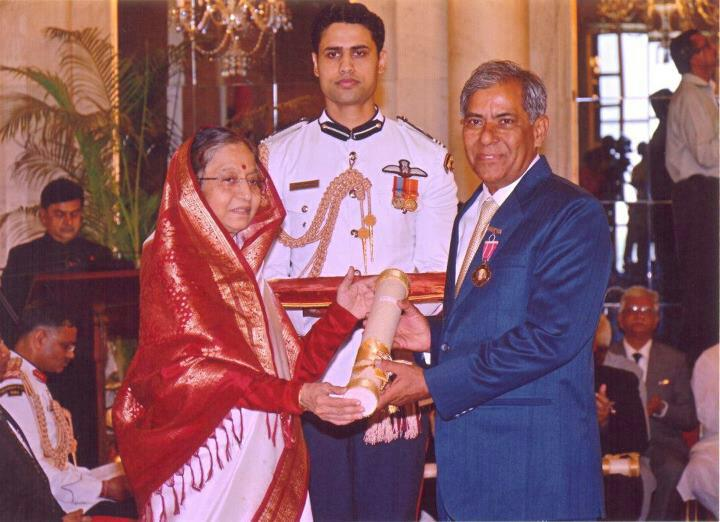
Dr Vijaipal Singh receiving Padma Shri from the Honourable President of India Mrs Pratibha Patil on 4 April 2012

V. P. Singh was honoured with Hari Om Ashram Trust Award by the Indian Council of Agricultural Research in 1974-75; Jawaharlal Nehru Award in 1977; B. P. Pal Memorial Award in 2005; ICAR Team Award in Crop Improvement in 2007; Third Rao Bahadur B. Viswanath Award by the Indian Agricultural Research Institute in 2006-07; ICAR Recognition Certificate in 2009; Padma Shri in 2012; Shri O.P. Bhasin Memorial Award in 2012; Doyen of Rice 2019 by Association of Rice Research Workers, Central Rice Research Institute, Cuttack and Basmati Rattan Award in 2019.

== Sources ==
- Rita Arora; Pinky Agarwal; Swatismita Ray; Ashok Kumar Singh; Vijai Pal Singh; Akhilesh K Thyagi; Sanjay Kapur (July 2007). "MADS-box Gene family in Rice: genome-wide identification, organization and expression of profiling during reproductive development and stress". BMC Genomics. 8 (242): 242. doi:10.1186/1471-2164-8-242. PMC 1947970. PMID 17640358.
- Vijaipal Singh; Ashok Kumar Singh; Trilochan Mohapatra; Gopala Krishnan S; Ranjith Kumar Ellur (2018). "Pusa Basmati 1121 – a rice variety with exceptional kernel elongation and volume expansion after cooking". Rice. 11 (19). doi:10.1186/s12284-018-0213-6. PMC 5890003.
