= Rice farming in Kenya =

Rice farming

Rice is an important part of Kenya's agriculture, commonly grown for subsistence farming but mainly for commercial output.

== Production ==
=== Central Province(Kirinyaga) ===
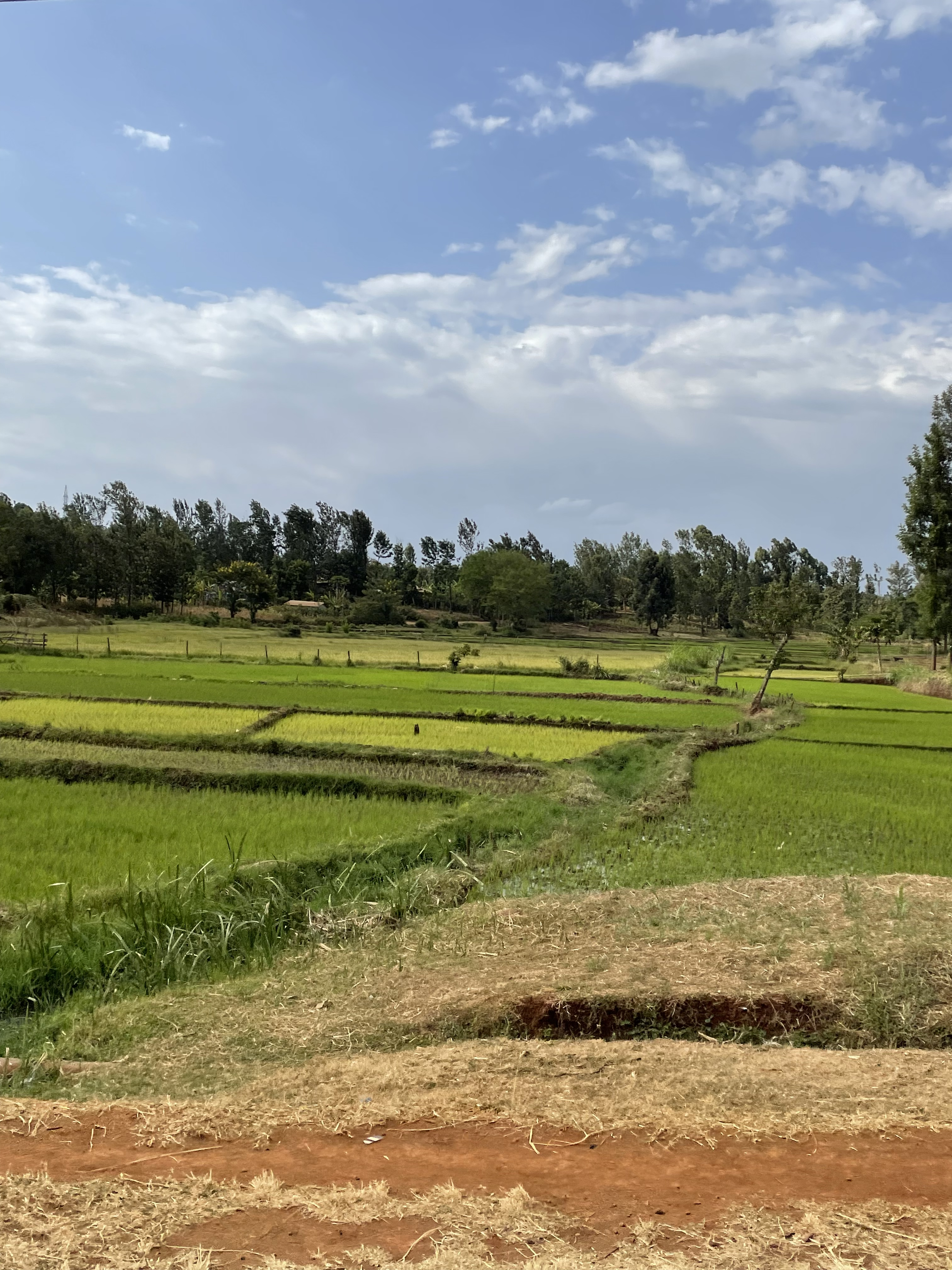
Rice paddies in Mwea, Kirinyaga.

Rice in Kirinyaga is mainly produced in the clay-rich plains of Mwea East and Mwea West sub-counties (70%). It is the product of the Mwea-Tebere irrigation scheme , initially founded in 1954, and channels water from the Thiba river from the base of Mount Kenya into channels that supply the 30600 acres (12300 hectares) of the scheme.

The farmers mostly use a combination of oxen and tractors to level, weed, and harvest the rice, and the use of fertilizers has shown an increase in annual yield over time.

Use of machinery compared to oxen (2011, 2016, 2018) in percentage(%)
	2011		2016		2018	
	Oxen	Tractor	Oxen	Tractor	Oxen	Tractor
% of farmers	99.6	98.0	97.3	82.2	98.8	41.5
Rotavation	0	98.0	0	16.3	0	32.9
Harrowing	2.4	0.4	8.1	65.5	97.6	1.2
Levelling	99.6	0	93.0	0	97.6	0
Transport	2.9	0	15.5	3.1	0	15.9
Harvesting	0	0	0	38.8	0	3.7

This data elaborates that Mwea has fewer farmers who use tractors in 2018 than 2016 by almost half. Again, the percentage of farmers rotavating had significantly dropped in 5 years from 2011 from 98% to 16.3% in 2016. In 2011, the percentage of the farmers transporting rice with oxen was at 0% in 2018 and the 15% from 2016 used tractors in 2018.

Fertiliser application and rice yield (2011, 2016, 2018)
	2011	2016	2018
NPK** (kg/ha)	139.28 (57.36)	86.76 (236.21)	66.54 (28.56)
Yields (tonnes/ha)	4.96 (1.52)	5.36 (3.71)	6.19 (1.45)

*The data is from Agricultural Development in Asia and Africa, Prof. Keijiro Otsuka

**NPK is a common fertilizer that means Nitrogen, Phosphorus, and Potassium fertilizer that is used during different stages of a crop to improve growth and annual yields, and commonly sold in different ratios, e.g., 44:8:7, 20:20:20, etc.

=== Nyanza Province(Kisumu) ===
==== Ahero Irrigation Scheme ====
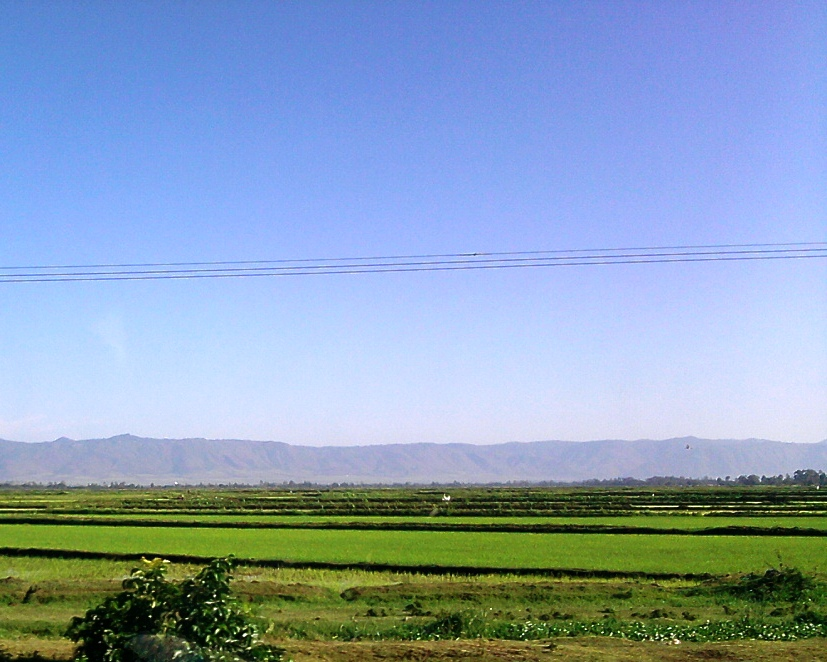
Rice paddies in the Ahero Irrigation scheme, Muhoroni, Kisumu

In Kisumu, rice is mainly grown in the Ahero Irrigation Scheme , which was established in 1966 in Muhoroni Sub-country. Currently, 10,810 acres (4374.65 ha) are under irrigation, and plans to expand by 4176 acres (1689.97 ha), and is irrigated by River Nyando. The scheme currently contributes around 58,000 tonnes annually (17.65%).

===== West Kano Irrigation Scheme =====
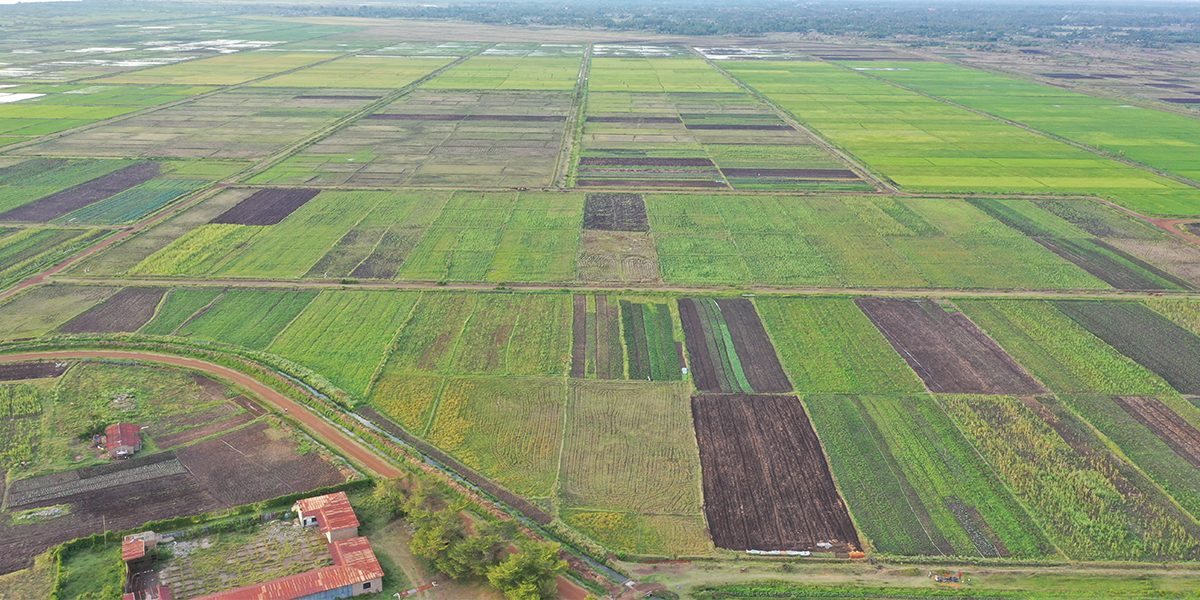
Overhead view of the West Kano Irrigation Scheme

West Kano Irrigation Scheme is located in the Kano plains between Nandi escarpment and Nyabondo plateau on the shores of Lake Victoria in Kisumu County. The Scheme was constructed in the year 1974 and become operational in 1976.

The scheme has 2230 acres (902.45 ha) under irrigation and produces 7,500 tonnes (2.28%) of rice annually.

== Challenges ==
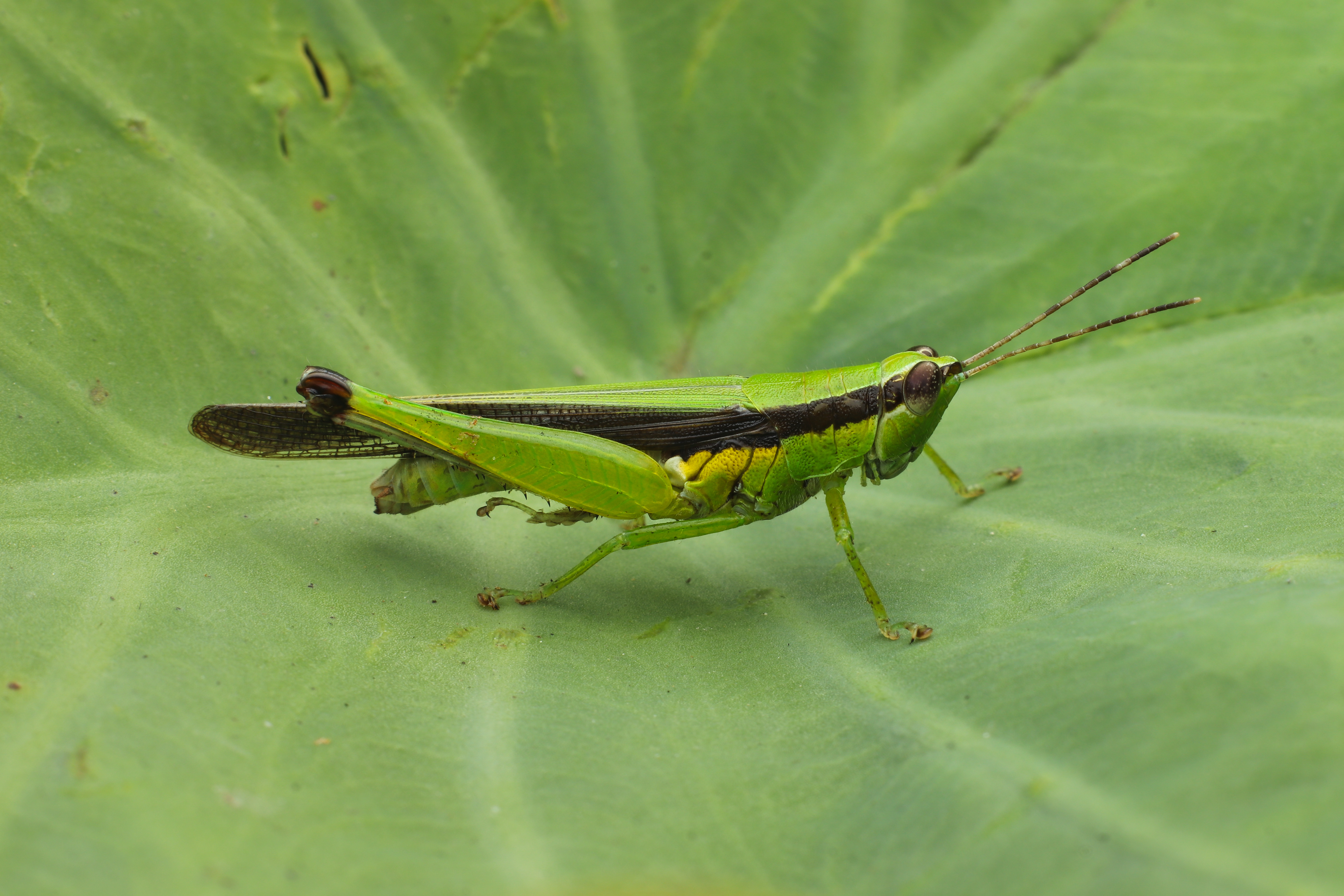
Rice grasshopper, a major paddy pest

The country produces approximately 230,000 tonnes of Basmati rice annually which is insufficient for the 1.3 million tones consumed in the same timeframe which is growing at a rate of 12% per annum, meaning the country heavily relies on imports from other countries mainly India (68%) and Pakistan (26%).

Rice is greatly affected by pests like rice grasshopper and water scarcity due to climate change has contributed to the loss of rice yield over the years and when mitigated can boost rice production.
