= Henry Beachell =

American plant breeder

- Born: September 21, 1906; Waverly, Nebraska, U.S.
- Died: December 13, 2006 (aged 100); Pearland, Texas, U.S.
- Education: University of Nebraska (B.S. 1930); Kansas State University (M.S. 1933)
- Awards: World Food Prize; Japan Prize
- Scientific career
- Fields: Plant breeding
- Thesis: The inheritance of resistance to leaf rust and bunt, and of other characters in the wheat cross, Tenmarq X Minturki (1933)
- Academic advisors: John H. Parker

Henry Monroe "Hank" Beachell (September 21, 1906 – December 13, 2006) was an American plant breeder. His research led to the development of hybrid rice cultivars that saved millions of people around the world from starvation.

Born in Waverly, Nebraska, Beachell and his family moved to a corn and wheat farm in western Nebraska. In 1930 he earned a bachelor's degegree in agronomy from the University of Nebraska, where he was a member of the FarmHouse fraternity. After obtaining a master's degree at Kansas State University, Beachell worked for the U.S. Department of Agriculture in Texas. There, he created nine rice varieties, which eventually accounted for more than 90 percent of the U.S. long-grain rice production. He went to International Rice Research Institute (IRRI) in 1963 after his retirement from the DOA. He created a high-yielding rice variety IR8 in 1964, based on the previous work by Peter Jennings (no relations to the US journalists). IR8 was officially released by IRRI in 1966. It dramatically increased the yields of Asian rice from 1 or 2 ton per hectare to 4 or 5 tons per hectare. It played a significant part in the Green Revolution.

Beachell has been called the most important person in rice improvement in the world. As farmers planted higher yielding rice, nutrition improved in many Asian countries, and farmers increased their incomes. Beachell was awarded an honorary doctorate from the University of Nebraska–Lincoln in 1972. Beachell has received many international awards, including the 1987 Japan Prize and 1996 World Food Prize. As a centenarian, Beachell consulted with RiceTec, the only commercial hybrid rice-breeding program in the U.S., up until his death.

Honorary titles
| Preceded by Hans Rudolf Herren | World Food Prize; 1996 | Succeeded by Smith and Adkisson |
