= Ashok K Singh =

Indian plant geneticist (born 1962)

Dr. Ashok Kumar Singh
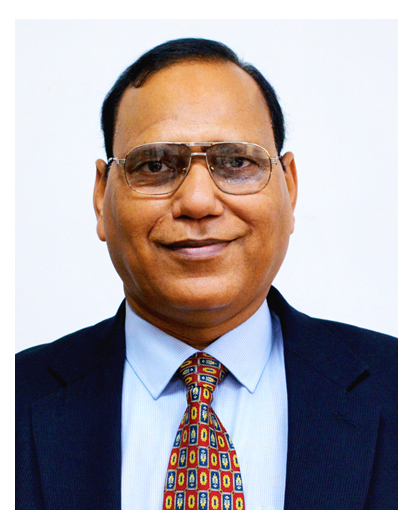
- Director and Vice Chancellor
- Born: 1 July 1962 (age 64); Barahat, Ghazipur, Uttar Pradesh, India
- Education: Banaras Hindu University; Indian Agricultural Research Institute
- Known for: Pusa Basmati rice varieties
- Awards: Rafi Ahmad Kidwai Award (2013), Borlaug Award (2012); Sh. O.P. Bhasin Award (2017)
- Scientific career
- Fields: Genetics and Plant Breeding
- Workplaces: Indian Agricultural Research Institute, New Delhi

Ashok Kumar Singh (born 1 July 1962) is an Indian scientist who works in the field of Plant Genetics and Breeding. He is known for his contribution to Basmati rice breeding. He is former director and Vice-Chancellor of the Indian Agricultural Research Institute, New Delhi, a deemed to be university. Dr Singh is an alumnus of Banaras Hindu University, Varanasi where he did his bachelor's degree and Masters Program in agriculture with specialisation in plant genetics and breeding. He received doctorate degree from the Indian Agricultural Research Institute, New Delhi for his research on rice breeding.

== Awards and honours ==
Dr. Ashok Kumar Singh has received several awards and recognitions for his services to the society. He is fellow of Indian National Science Academy, New Delhi; National Academy of Agricultural Sciences, New Delhi and Indian Society of Genetics and Plant Breeding, New Delhi.

- ICAR-Rafi Ahmad Kidwai Award (2013)
- ICAR-Bharat Ratna Dr. C. Subramanian Award (2013)
- IARI – Best teacher award (2002)
- IARI- B.P. Pal Award (2007)
- ICAR – Special Recognition Certificate (2009)
- Agriculture Leadership Award (2011)
- Borlaug Award (2012)
- Dr. AS Cheema Award (2012)
- Om Prakash Bhasin Award (2017)
- Padma Shree (2026)

== Publications ==
Dr. Singh has published more than 120 research articles in international and national journals on rice genetics, molecular breeding, and grain quality. Marker Assisted Plant Breeding: Principles and Practices is a book he co-authored with Professor Brahma Deo Singh and published by Springer. A complete list of Dr Singh's publications is available at Google scholar citations page.
