= Basmati =

Variety of long-grain rice originating from Indian subcontinent

Basmati rice
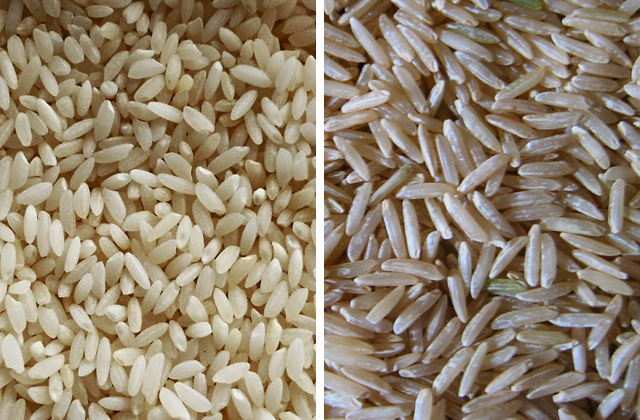
- Brown short-grain rice (left) compared to brown basmati rice (right)
- Species: Oryza sativa
- Cultivar group: Basmati
- Cultivar: Basmati Sal, Basmati 370
- Origin: Indian subcontinent

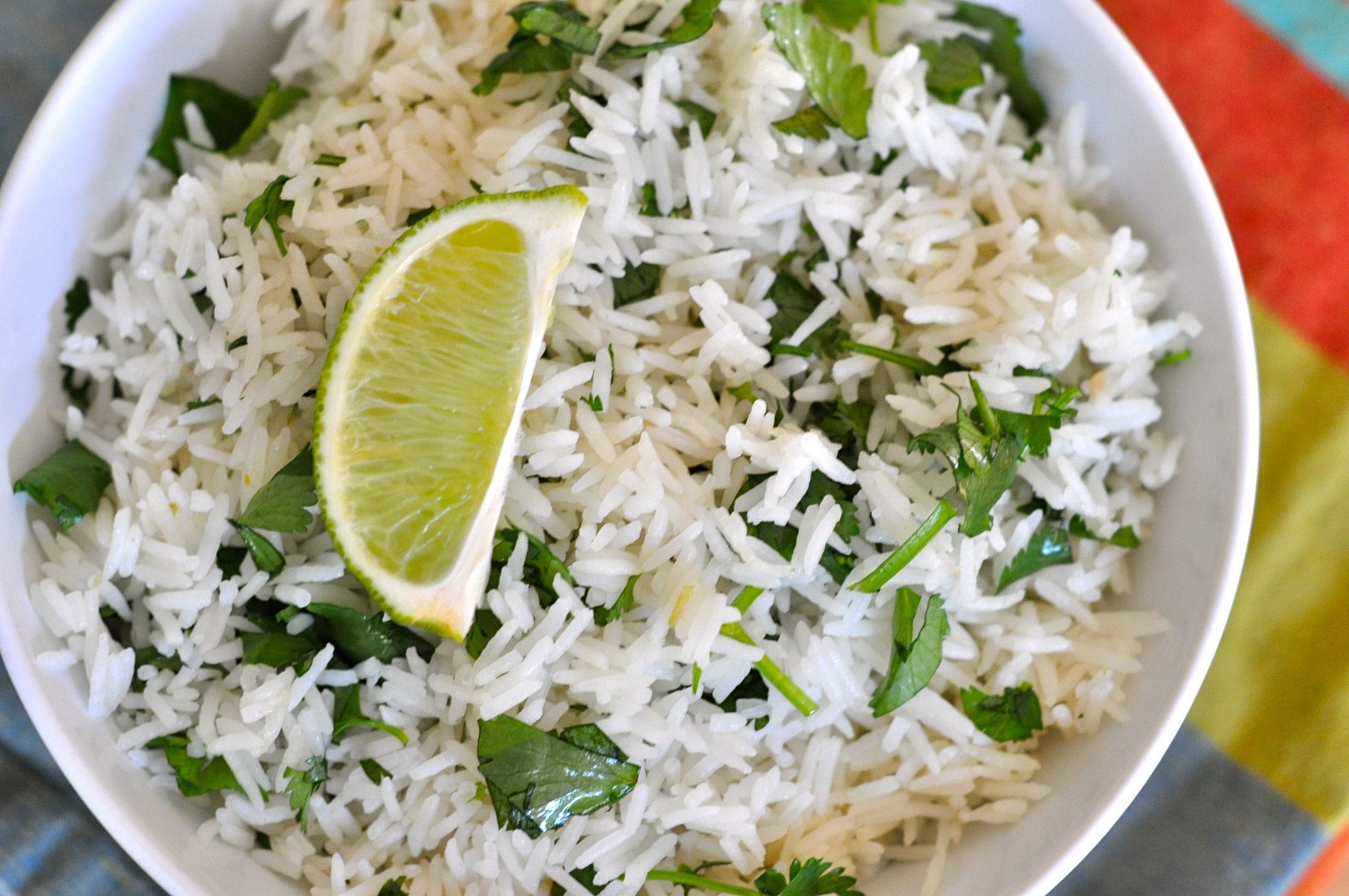
White basmati rice cooked with Burmese fish mint

Basmati (pronounced ['bɑːsmət̪iː]) is a variety of long, slender-grained aromatic rice which originates from the Indian subcontinent, mainly in the regions of Haryana, Punjab, Sindh and many other states and provinces of India, Pakistan and Nepal. As of 2019, India accounted for 65% of the international trade in basmati rice, while Pakistan accounted for the remaining 35%. Many countries use domestically grown basmati rice crops; however, basmati is geographically exclusive to certain districts of India and Pakistan.

According to the Indian Agricultural and Processed Food Products Export Development Authority (APEDA), a rice variety is eligible to be called basmati if it has a minimum average precooked milled rice length of 6.61 mm (0.260 in) and average precooked milled rice breadth of up to 2 mm (0.079 in), among other parameters.

== History and Etymology ==
=== Etymology ===
The word basmati is derived from two root words in Sanskrit; vas meaning fragrance and mayup meaning present or ingrained. When combining the two, mayup becomes mati resulting in vasmati more commonly pronounced as basmati.

=== History ===
Basmati rice is believed to have been cultivated in the Indian subcontinent for centuries. The earliest mention of basmati rice was made in the epic Heer Ranjha composed by the Punjabi poet, Waris Shah in 1766.

== Production and cultivation ==
India accounts for over 70% of the world's basmati rice production. A small portion of that is being grown organically. Organisations such as Kheti Virasat Mission are trying to increase the amount of organic basmati rice that is being grown in Haryana, Indian Punjab, Himachal Pradesh.

=== In India ===
The areas which have a geographical indication for basmati rice production in India are in the states of Uttarakhand, Bihar, Punjab, Haryana, Himachal Pradesh, Delhi, western Uttar Pradesh, Odisha and Jammu and Kashmir.

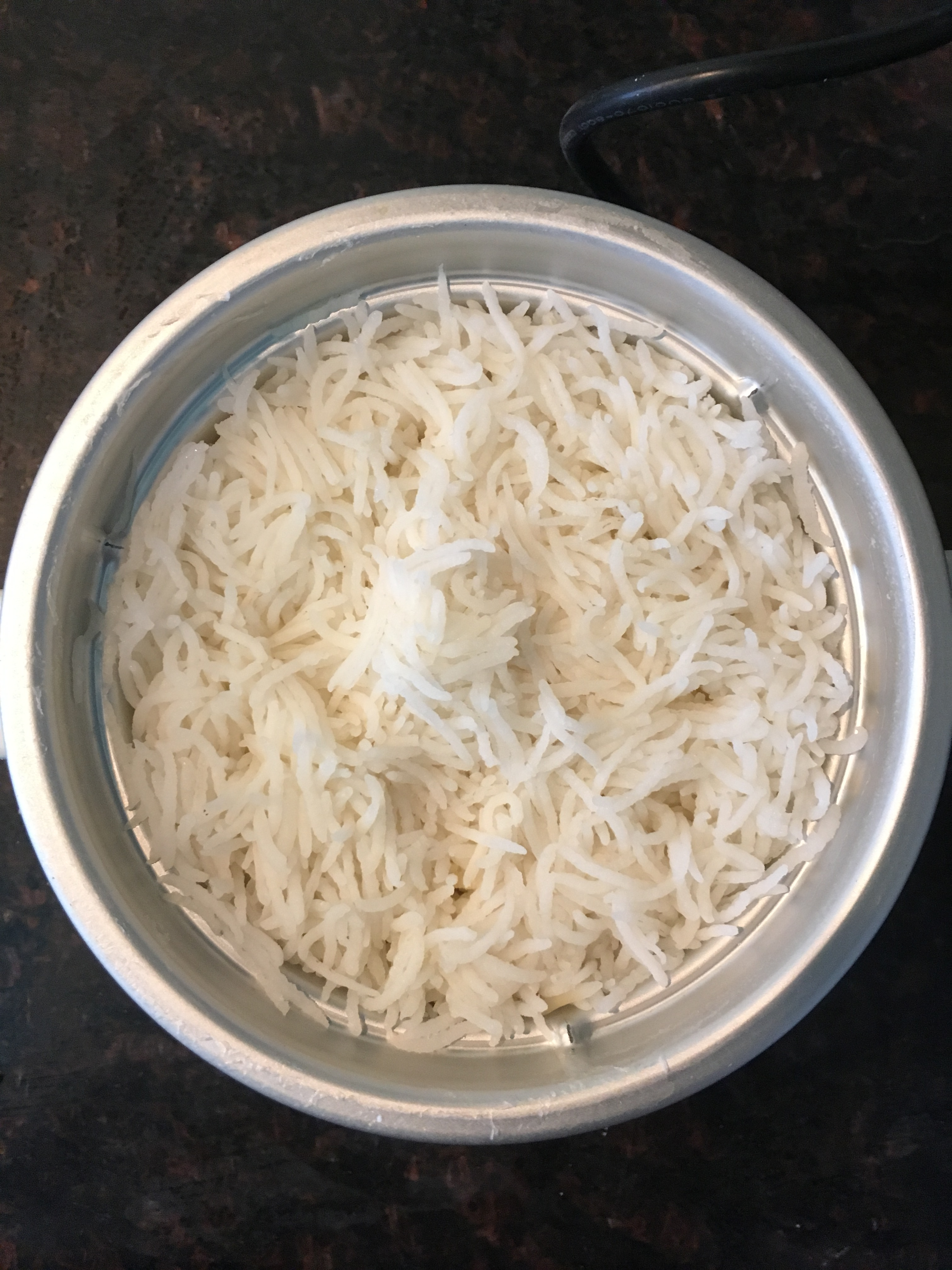
Long Grain Basmati rice is widely used for many meat and vegetarian curries in India

India's total basmati production for the July 2011 – June 2012 crop year was five million tonnes. From April 2018 to March 2019, India exported 4.4 million metric tons of basmati rice. In 2015–2016, Saudi Arabia, Iran and UAE were the three biggest destinations for India's basmati rice exports and exports to these three countries accounted for more than half of India's total basmati exports. Others are exported to Australia, Canada, EU, South Africa, New Zealand, Turkey, the UK and US.

In 2015–2016, basmati rice worth US$3.4 billion was exported from India. From 2018 to 2021 annual exports have surpassed US$4 billion.

In September 2026, frequent power cuts forced rice millers in Punjab, India to halt operations and suspend purchases of the newly arriving 1509 basmati variety.

=== In Pakistan ===
According to the Food and Agriculture Organization (FAO), Pakistan's original basmati area lies in the Kalar bowl between the Ravi and Chenab rivers. Almost all the cultivation of basmati takes place in the Punjab province where total production was 2.47 million metric tons (2,430,000 long tons; 2,720,000 short tons) in 2010. In fiscal year 2020, basmati exports stood at 890,207 tonnes valuing $790 million. In overall basmati exports, European Union, Turkey and the UK holds a 40% share while the rest are exported to Gulf countries, Australia, Canada, South Africa, New Zealand and the US.

=== In Indonesia ===
Indonesia produced its own local variant of basmati in West Java and Central Kalimantan, with production capacity estimated to reach up to 8.2 tonnes per hectare. Basmati seeds were first brought from Pakistan in 2007; however, the seeds were unable to be grown due to soil incompatibility. The Ministry of Agriculture then managed to produce and cultivate a hybrid between basmati and local rice in 2017.

=== In Nepal ===
Basmati rice is produced mainly in the Terai region of Nepal and some parts of Kathmandu Valley. Unique Nepali varieties of basmati rice were barred from export to other parts of the world although this ban might be lifted.

=== In Sri Lanka ===
Small amounts of basmati rice, especially red basmati rice, are being cultivated in the tropical wet zone areas of Sri Lanka.

== Aroma and flavour ==
Like Jasmine rice basmati rice has a typical pandan-like (Pandanus amaryllifolius leaf) flavour caused by the aroma compound 2-acetyl-1-pyrroline. Basmati grains contain about 0.09 ppm of this aromatic chemical compound naturally, a level that is about 12 times as much as non-aromatic rice varieties, giving basmati its distinctive fragrance and flavour. This natural aroma is also found in cheese, fruit and other cereals. It is a flavoring agent approved in the United States and Europe, and is used in bakery products for aroma.

During cooking, the level of 2-acetyl-1-pyrroline decreases. Soaking the rice for 30 minutes before cooking permits 20% shorter cooking times and preserves more of the 2-acetyl-1-pyrroline.

== Glycemic index ==
According to the Canadian Diabetes Association, basmati, brown, wild, short and long grain rice has a medium glycemic index (between 56 and 69), opposed to jasmine and instant white rice with a glycemic index of 89, thus making it more suitable for diabetics as compared to certain other grains and products made from white flour.

== Varieties and hybrids ==
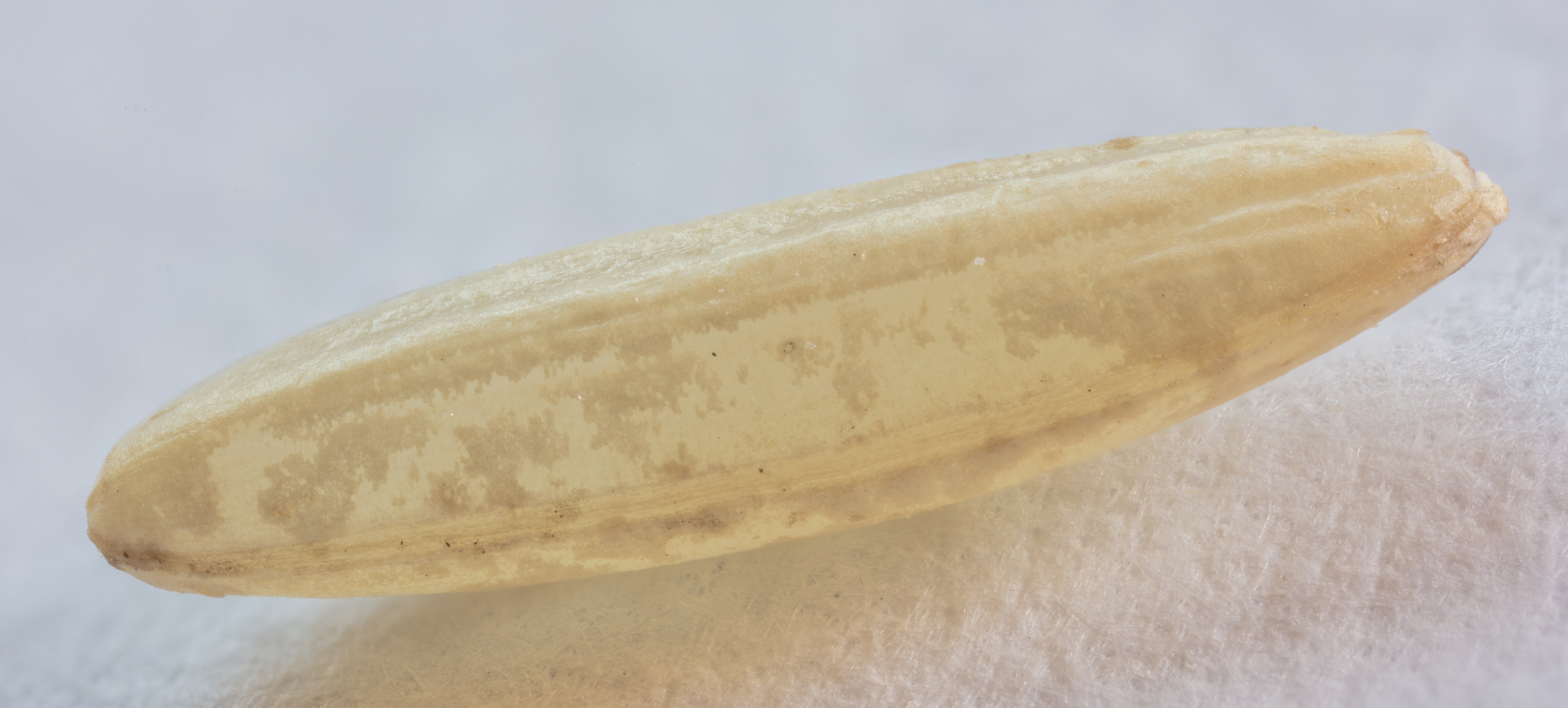
Grain of brown variety, high resolution

There are several varieties of basmati rice. Traditional Indian types include basmati 370, basmati 385, and basmati Ranbirsinghpura (R.S.Pura) and Gujjar Chack area in Jammu province situated at the India-Pakistani border in Jammu Kashmir state of India. 1121 and Muradabadi 6465 Extra Long Grain Rice. Pakistani basmati rice varieties are PK 385, Super Kernel Basmati Rice, and D-98.

Scientists at Indian Agricultural Research Institute (IARI), Delhi, used conventional plant breeding to produce a hybrid semi-dwarf plant which had most of the good features of traditional basmati (grain elongation, fragrance, alkali content). This hybrid was called Pusa Basmati-1 (PB1; also called "Todal", because the flower has awns); crop yield is up to twice as high as traditional varieties. Fragrant rices that are derived from basmati stock but are not true basmati varieties include PB2 (also called sugandh-2), PB3, and RS-10.

=== Approved varieties ===
==== Dehradun Basmati (Indian) ====
Dehradun Basmati or traditional basmati rice variety type 3 is a group of various basmati varieties that originated in the present day Dehradun of Uttarakhand, India. From Dehradun the variety was propagated and grown in other regions of Uttarakhand, most notably in Tapovan, Tehri. The basmati varieties collectively known as Dehradun Basmati are significant because of their higher grain quality, unique 'popcorn' aroma and flavour. The Dehradun Basmati has also been the source of other GMO varieties grown in present-day Uttar Pradesh, Punjab and Haryana.

Despite not all varieties having received official GI certification Dehradun Basmati varieties consistently rank among the highest rated rice varieties in the world and are distinct for their popcorn like aroma. The popcorn aroma is among some of the special properties basmati exhibits when grown under the agro-climatic conditions of the Himalayan region. The variety is significant to the farmer identity in state of Uttarakhand, for whom it is among the most profitable crops.

==== Indian varieties ====
Basmati, P3 Punjab, type III Uttar Pradesh, hbc-19 Safidon, 386 Haryana, Kasturi (Baran, Rajasthan), Muradabadi Basmati 6465, Basmati 198, Basmati 217, Basmati 370 Bihar, Kasturi, Mahi Suganda, Pusa 1121, Pusa 1718, Pusa 1509, Pusa 1692, Pusa 1637, Pusa 1847, Pusa 1885, Pusa 1401, 1718 Steam Basmati Rice, Golden Sella Basmati Rice and 1121 Basmati.

==== Pakistani varieties ====
Basmati 370 (Pak Basmati), Super Basmati (Best Aroma), Basmati Pak (Kernal), 386 or 1121 basmati rice, Basmati 385, Basmati 515, Basmati 2000, Basmati 198 and Chanab Basmati. All the above basmati varieties mentioned later are basically Indian Basmati only.

== Related varieties from around the world ==
In Indonesia, the variant of basmati called baroma (basmati aromatik; aromatic basmati) was launched in February 2019. This variant could be grown in low-altitude terrain and managed to attract interest among potential middle-to-upper class consumers.

In the United States, a variety of rice based on basmati called Texmati is grown in Texas. The rice is produced by Rice Select, previously owned by RiceTec (mentioned below).

In Kenya, a rice variety called Pishori or Pisori is grown in the Mwea region. The word Pishori is an alteration of the word Peshawari from where the basmati variety used to be exported to the countries of East Africa in the past.

== Basmati certification ==
The Basmati Mark is a DNA-fingerprinting-based certification done by the laboratory of Basmati Export Development Foundation (BEDF).

On 15 February 2016, the Agricultural & Processed Food Products Export Development Authority (APEDA), an autonomous organisation under the Department of Commerce in India, registered basmati rice as a product with Geographical Indication (GI).

On 30 April 2026, APEDA has signed a 70 year lease agreement with Uttar Pradesh's Agriculture Dept. for establishing a Basmati & Organic Training Centre in Pilibhit, aimed at strengthening the basmati rice ecosystem in India.

In August 2026, the Australian Federal Court rejected a plea by Indian exporters to grant Basmati rice an exclusive legal status in Australia. The decision negatively affected major rice producing states like Punjab and Haryana, which were attempting to expand into new markets during trade disruptions in the Strait of Hormuz.

In the EU, European agricultural experts challenged India's application for Protected Geographical Indication status for Basmati rice in September 2026, arguing that Basmati should be treated as a generic term. Opponents claimed that fragnant rice sales in the EU exceeded production levels in certified origin regions, though trade representatives noted these claims lacked empirical verification.

== Adulteration ==
Difficulty in differentiating genuine basmati from other types of rice and the significant price difference between them has led fraudulent traders to adulterate basmati rice with crossbred basmati varieties and long-grain non-basmati varieties. In Britain, the Food Standards Agency found in 2005 that about half of all basmati rice sold was adulterated with other strains of long-grain rice, prompting rice importers to agree to a code of practice. A 2010 UK test on rice supplied by wholesalers found 4 out of 15 samples had cheaper rice mixed with basmati, and one had no basmati at all.

A PCR-based assay similar to DNA fingerprinting in humans allows adulterated and non-basmati strains to be detected, with a detection limit from 1% adulteration upwards with an error rate of ±1.5%. Exporters of basmati rice use purity certificates based on DNA tests for their basmati rice consignments. Based on this protocol, which was developed at the Centre for DNA Fingerprinting and Diagnostics, the Indian company Lab India has released kits to detect basmati adulteration.

== Patent battle ==
In September 1997, an American company, RiceTec, was granted U.S. Patent No. 5,663,484 on "basmati rice lines and grains". The patent secured lines of basmati and basmati-like rice and ways of analyzing that rice. RiceTec, owned by Prince Hans-Adam of Liechtenstein, faced international outrage over allegations of biopiracy. It also caused a brief diplomatic crisis between India and the United States, with India threatening to take the matter to the WTO as a violation of TRIPS, the Agreement on Trade-Related Aspects of Intellectual Property Rights. Both voluntarily and due to review decisions by the United States Patent and Trademark Office, RiceTec lost or withdrew most of the claims of the patent, including, most importantly, the right to call their rice products basmati. A more limited varietal patent was granted to RiceTec in 2001 on claims dealing with three strains of the rice developed by the company. The original patent expired in 2019.

== See also ==
- Ambemohar
- Camargue red rice
- Domsiah
- Jasmine rice
- List of rice varieties
- Manoomin
- Oryza sativa
