= Direct seeded rice =

Practice for sowing rice paddies

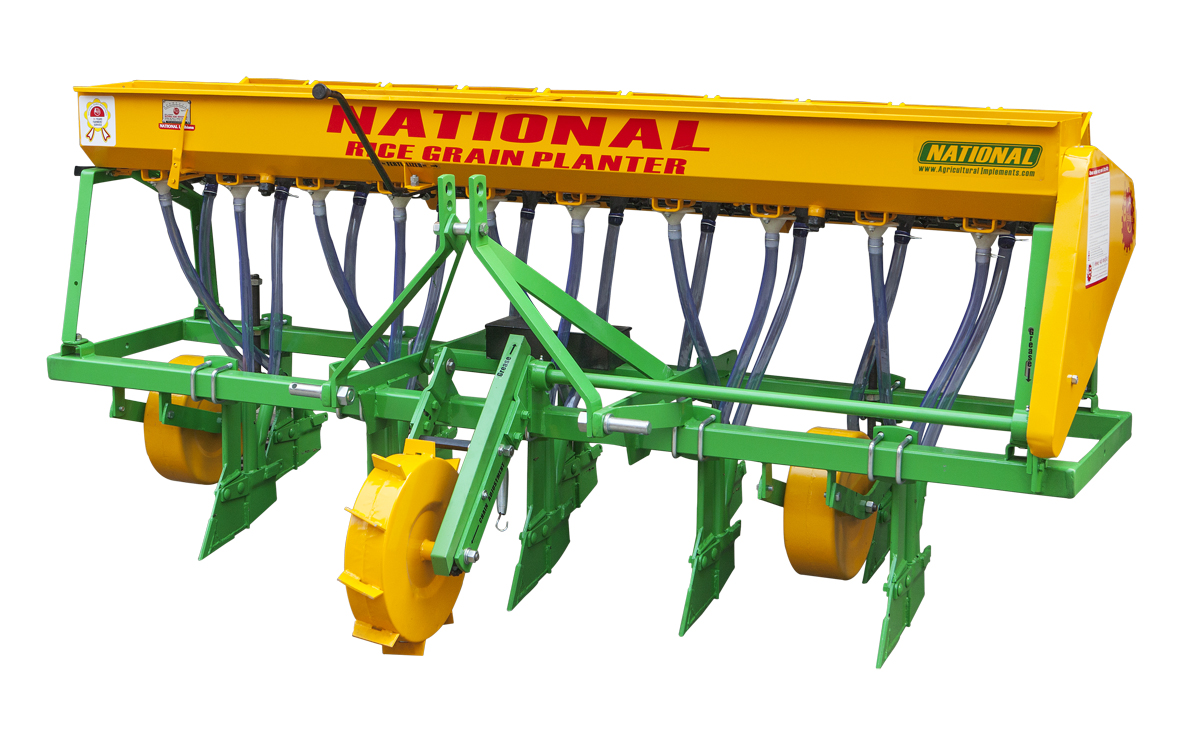
Direct Seeder for Rice

Direct seeded rice (DSR) is a practice of sowing paddy which involves planting rice seeds directly into the field, instead of the traditional method of growing seedlings in nurseries and then transplanting them into the fields. This method significantly reduces the demand for labor, one of the major costs associated with rice farming. By eliminating the need for transplanting, farmers can cut down on labor costs and effectively manage the workforce during peak periods. It also provides flexibility in timing the planting, helping farmers to adapt to changing climate conditions. Moreover, DSR offers water efficiency. Traditional rice farming involves flooding fields, which is water-intensive and often unsustainable. Direct seeding of rice, on the other hand, requires less water during the establishment period, making it an attractive solution in regions experiencing water scarcity. Reduced water usage in DSR systems can help lower methane emissions, a potent greenhouse gas significantly produced in flooded rice paddies.

== Challenges ==
One of the most significant hurdles is weed control. In flooded paddies, water serves as a natural barrier to weed growth. However, in DSR systems, weeds can grow alongside rice, reducing yield. Thus, effective weed management strategies are critical for the successful application of DSR.

Another concern is the need for precision in seed placement. Unlike transplanting, where seedlings are carefully placed in fields, direct seeding requires accurate equipment to ensure optimal plant density and uniform growth. Technological advancements, such as laser-assisted land leveling and drill seeders, are paving the way for overcoming these challenges, making DSR an increasingly feasible option for farmers.
