= Waverly, Nebraska =

- City
- Location of Waverly,
- Coordinates: 40°54′41″N 96°32′02″W
- Country: United States
- State: Nebraska
- County: Lancaster

Area
  - Total: 2.43 sq mi (6.29 km^{2})
  - Land: 2.43 sq mi (6.29 km^{2})
  - Water: 0 sq mi (0.00 km^{2})
- Elevation: 1,125 ft (343 m)

Population (2020)
  - Total: 4,279
  - Density: 1,762.1/sq mi (680.35/km^{2})
- Time zone: UTC-6 (Central (CST))
  - Summer (DST): UTC-5 (CDT)
- ZIP code: 68462
- Area code: 402
- FIPS code: 31-51770
- GNIS feature ID: 2397229
- Website: www.citywaverly.com

Waverly is a city in Lancaster County, Nebraska, United States. It is part of the Lincoln, Nebraska metropolitan area. The population was 4,279 at the 2020 census.

== History ==
Waverly was platted in 1870 when the railroad was extended to that point. It was named after Walter Scott's 1814 historical novel Waverley; several of the city's street names were taken from the novel as well. Waverly was incorporated as a village in 1885. From 1921 to 1966 Waverly consolidated its school district with several surrounding school districts, allowing for the school system in Waverly to grow.

== Geography ==
According to the United States Census Bureau, the city has a total area of 2.35 square miles (6.09 km^{2}), all land.

== Demographics ==
Historical population
Census	Pop.	Note	%±
1880	132		—
1890	490		271.2%
1900	266		−45.7%
1910	297		11.7%
1920	334		12.5%
1930	315		−5.7%
1940	306		−2.9%
1950	310		1.3%
1960	511		64.8%
1970	1,152		125.4%
1980	1,726		49.8%
1990	1,869		8.3%
2000	2,448		31.0%
2010	3,277		33.9%
2020	4,279		30.6%
U.S. Decennial Census; 2013 Estimate

=== 2020 census ===
As of the 2020 census, Waverly had a population of 4,279. The median age was 34.6 years. 33.5% of residents were under the age of 18 and 11.2% of residents were 65 years of age or older. For every 100 females there were 97.4 males, and for every 100 females age 18 and over there were 93.3 males age 18 and over.

0.0% of residents lived in urban areas, while 100.0% lived in rural areas.

There were 1,469 households in Waverly, of which 49.9% had children under the age of 18 living in them. Of all households, 63.9% were married-couple households, 11.4% were households with a male householder and no spouse or partner present, and 19.3% were households with a female householder and no spouse or partner present. About 18.6% of all households were made up of individuals and 9.1% had someone living alone who was 65 years of age or older.

There were 1,487 housing units, of which 1.2% were vacant. The homeowner vacancy rate was 0.1% and the rental vacancy rate was 5.8%.

Racial composition as of the 2020 census
Race	Number	Percent
White	4,040	94.4%
Black or African American	24	0.6%
American Indian and Alaska Native	7	0.2%
Asian	41	1.0%
Native Hawaiian and Other Pacific Islander	0	0.0%
Some other race	29	0.7%
Two or more races	138	3.2%
Hispanic or Latino (of any race)	118	2.8%

=== 2010 census ===
As of the census of 2010, there were 3,277 people, 1,113 households, and 903 families living in the city. The population density was 1,394.5 inhabitants per square mile (538.4/km^{2}). There were 1,152 housing units at an average density of 490.2 per square mile (189.3/km^{2}). The racial makeup of the city was 98.2% White, 0.2% African American, 0.2% Native American, 0.3% Asian, 0.4% from other races, and 0.9% from two or more races. Hispanic or Latino of any race were 1.4% of the population.

There were 1,113 households, of which 49.9% had children under the age of 18 living with them, 67.7% were married couples living together, 9.1% had a female householder with no husband present, 4.3% had a male householder with no wife present, and 18.9% were non-families. 16.0% of all households were made up of individuals, and 4.4% had someone living alone who was 65 years of age or older. The average household size was 2.90 and the average family size was 3.24.

The median age in the city was 32.8 years. 33.4% of residents were under the age of 18; 5.5% were between the ages of 18 and 24; 31.2% were from 25 to 44; 20.8% were from 45 to 64; and 9.2% were 65 years of age or older. The gender makeup of the city was 50.4% male and 49.6% female.

=== 2000 census ===
As of the census of 2000, there were 2,448 people, 838 households, and 670 families living in the city. The population density was 2,621.9 inhabitants per square mile (1,012.3/km^{2}). There were 860 housing units at an average density of 921.1 per square mile (355.6/km^{2}). The racial makeup of the city was 98.00% White, 0.12% African American, 0.53% Native American, 0.29% Asian, 0.04% Pacific Islander, 0.16% from other races, and 0.86% from two or more races. Hispanic or Latino of any race were 0.82% of the population.

There were 838 households, out of which 47.7% had children under the age of 18 living with them, 67.9% were married couples living together, 8.9% had a female householder with no husband present, and 20.0% were non-families. 17.5% of all households were made up of individuals, and 7.4% had someone living alone who was 65 years of age or older. The average household size was 2.86 and the average family size was 3.26.

In the city, the population was spread out, with 32.6% under the age of 18, 7.2% from 18 to 24, 31.9% from 25 to 44, 19.2% from 45 to 64, and 9.2% who were 65 years of age or older. The median age was 32 years. For every 100 females, there were 94.0 males. For every 100 females age 18 and over, there were 91.1 males.

As of 2000 the median income for a household in the city was $52,454, and the median income for a family was $56,875. Males had a median income of $36,960 versus $25,938 for females. The per capita income for the city was $18,009. About 3.2% of families and 3.1% of the population were below the poverty line, including 2.4% of those under age 18 and 9.2% of those age 65 or over.

== Education ==
Waverly is within the Waverly School District 145, and home to the following schools:

- Evelyn Hamlow Elementary School; pre-school–2nd grade:
- Waverly Intermediate School–{W.I.S}; 3rd–5th grade:
- Waverly Middle School; 6th–8th grade:
- Waverly High School; 9th–12th

== Notable people ==
- Henry Beachell (1906-2006), plant breeder
- Charles J. Warner (1875–1955), American politician
