= Super Saver Foods (B&R Stores) =

American grocery store chain

Super Saver

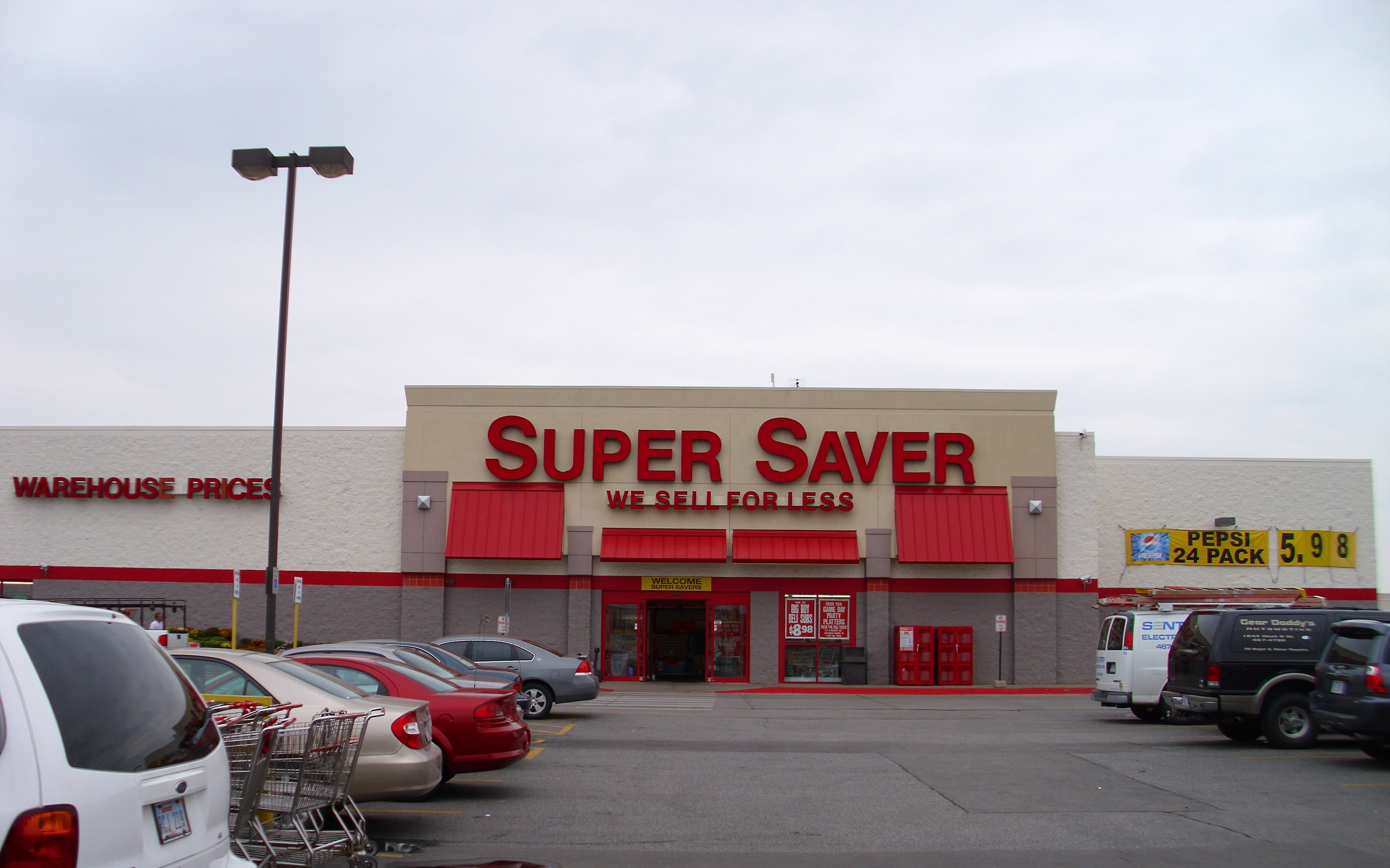
- A Super Saver Grocery Store on 27th & Cornhusker Hwy in Lincoln, NE
- Type: Subsidiary
- Industry: Retail (Grocery & Discount)
- Founded: 1984 (42 years ago) in Lincoln, Nebraska, U.S.
- Headquarters: Lincoln, Nebraska, U.S.
- Number of locations: 9
- Area served: Iowa, Nebraska
- Products: Groceries, General Merchandise
- Parent: B&R Stores
- Website: super-saver.com

Super Saver is a chain of grocery stores owned and operated by B&R Stores, Inc. It is a low-price grocer in Nebraska corporation that operates exclusively in the retail grocery industry and has its corporate headquarters in Lincoln, Nebraska, United States.

== History ==
The first B&R Stores-owned Super Saver store was opened in 1984 at 48th & O Streets in Lincoln. At the time of its opening, it was the largest retail grocery store in the state in terms of square footage (60,000 square feet). In 1988 a second Super Saver was opened with 70,000 square feet (6,500 m^{2}) at 27th & Cornhusker Highway, and a third store was opened in July 1991 at 56th & Highway 2. In 1993, the Company opened a store in Council Bluffs, Iowa, marking Super Saver's entrance into a market outside Lincoln. Growth continued for the Super Saver concept, and in 1999 B&R Stores purchased the Food-4-Less store in Columbus, Nebraska and the Festival of Foods store in Grand Island, Nebraska. A new Super Saver store at 27th & Pine Lake Road in Lincoln was completed in October 1999. An Omaha, Nebraska-area location was added in June 2000 with the opening of B&R's largest store, an 83,000-square-foot (7,700 m^{2}) Super Saver at 144th & Stoned location opened in Columbus, Nebraska.

A replacement location was opened in Columbus, Nebraska in March 2025.
