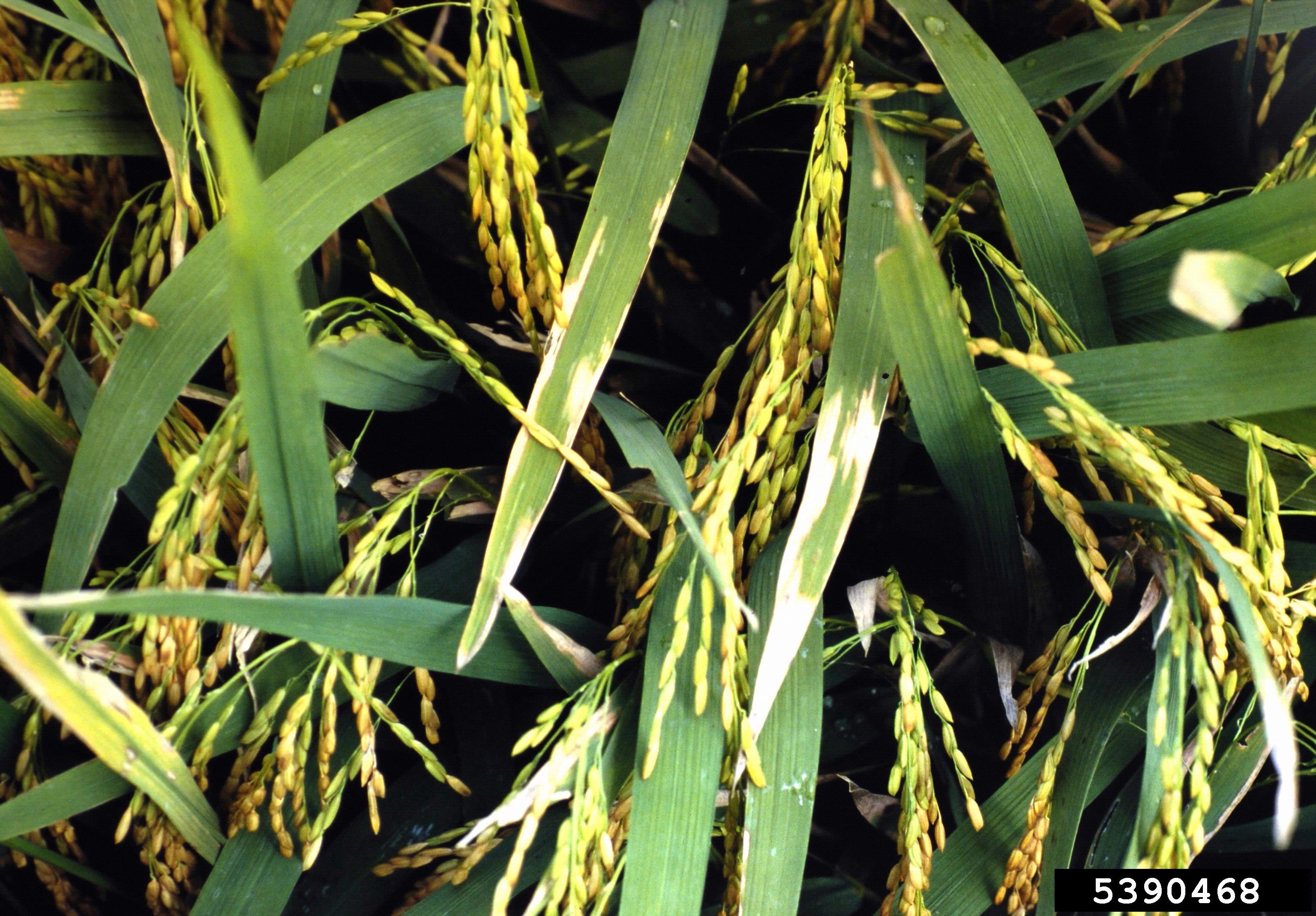
- Xanthomonas oryzae pv. oryzae, bacterial blight of rice

Scientific classification
- Domain: Bacteria
- Kingdom: Pseudomonadati
- Phylum: Pseudomonadota
- Class: Gammaproteobacteria
- Order: Lysobacterales
- Family: Lysobacteraceae
- Genus: Xanthomonas
- Species: X. oryzae
- Pathovar: X. o. pv. oryzae

Trionomial name
- Xanthomonas oryzae pv. oryzae

= Xanthomonas oryzae pv. oryzae =

Variety of bacteria

Xanthomonas oryzae pv. oryzae is a bacterial pathovar that causes a serious blight of rice, other grasses, and sedges.

== Background ==
The genus Xanthomonas, which mostly comprises phytopathogenic bacteria, is a member of the family Xanthomonadaceae. Among xanthomonads, X. o. pv. oryzae causes bacterial blight (BB) of rice which is one of the most important diseases of rice in most of the rice growing countries.

Bacterial blight of rice has high epidemic potential and is destructive to high-yielding cultivars in both temperate and tropical regions especially in Asia. Its occurrence in the 70s in Africa and the Americas has led to concerns about its transmission and dissemination.

Research on bacterial blight of rice was begun in Japan as early as in 1901, and those efforts were focused mainly on ecological studies and chemical control. Since then, significant gains have been made in understanding BB through analysis of the interactions between X. oryzae pv. oryzae and rice at many levels, including studies focused on the epidemiology, population biology, physiology, cell biology, biochemistry, and molecular genetics of the host pathogen interaction. It is very notable that BB became the first case where the genome sequencing of both host plant and pathogen was completed.

== Hosts ==
There is a very large host range for Xanthomonas oryzae pv. oryzaa.

Among the grasses, hosts include:

- Cenchrus ciliaris (Buffelgrass)
- Cynodon dactylon (Bermuda grass)
- Echinochloa crus-galli (Barnyard grass)
- Leersia hexandra (Southern cut grass)
- Leersia oryzoides (Rice cutgrass)
- Leersia sayanuka (Rice cutgrass)
- Leptochloa chinensis (Chinese sprangletop)
- Oryza (species of rice), including
  - Oryza sativa (Rice)
- Panicum maximum (Guinea grass)
- Paspalum scrobiculatum (Ricegrass paspalum)
- Poaceae (Meadow grasses)
- Urochloa mutica (Tall panicum)
- Zizania aquatica (Annual wildrice)
- Zizania palustris (Northern wild rice (USA))
- Zoysia japonica (Zoysiagrass)

Among the Cyperaceae (Sedges), hosts include:

- Cyperus difformis (Small-flowered nutsedge)
- Cyperus rotundus (Purple nutsedge)

== Symptoms ==
- Symptoms appear on the leaves of young plants as pale-green to grey-green, water-soaked streaks near the leaf tip and margins.
- These lesions coalesce and become yellowish-white with wavy edges.
- The whole leaf may eventually be affected, becoming whitish or greyish and then dying.
- Leaf sheaths and culms of more susceptible cultivars may be attacked.
- Systemic infection results in wilting, desiccation of leaves and death, particularly of young transplanted plants.
- In older plants, the leaves become yellow and then die.

In its advanced stages, the disease is difficult to distinguish from leaf blight caused by X. o. pv. oryzicola, but lesion margins are wavy rather than linear as for the former. Damage is often associated with lepidopteran leaf folder/rollers and hispa beetles, since bacteria readily enter the damaged tissue caused by insect infestation.

== Disease cycle ==
Rice plants become infected with Xanthomonas oryzae through rice seed, stem and roots that are left behind at harvest, as well as alternative weed hosts. X. oryzae lives on dead plants and seeds and probably moves plant-to-plant best through pattywater from irrigation or storms. Upon introduction to the host plant, the bacterium infiltrates the plant through natural openings (water pores and growth cracks on roots) and/or leaf and root wounds. X. oryzae grows in the plant and infects the plant's leaf veins as well as the xylem causing blockage and plant wilting. Bacteria oozes from leaf lesions and is spread by wind or rain, especially when strong storms occur and cause wounds to plants. X. oryzae has a wide host range that includes Leersia sayanuka which acts as alternative host for the bacterium and are considered the most important source of primary inoculums, as well as a great mechanism for bacterium survival.

== Environment ==
Xanthomonas oryzae is endemic to Japan, but can also be found throughout the tropical rice producing countries of Asia. In the tropics the pathogen has the highest level of incidence during the rainy season when rain and wind wound crops. Rain and infected pattywater are the main dispersers of the disease therefore fields found in low, wet areas with poor drainage and susceptibility to flooding are areas of high incidence. The presence of Leersia sayanuka is also key to the spread of disease because it is a naturally growing weed usually found around patties and has the ability to be infected by the bacterium and spread the bacterium through a rice patty.

The use of nitrogenous fertilizer has shown an increase in incidence but mainly because there is more plant growth and conditions stay more humid, but does not have an effect on lesion size. During drier weather bacterial ooze will secrete from leaf lesions in hopes of finding a new host. Ideal temperatures for X. oryzae growth are 26–30 °C (79–86 °F); 20 °C (68 °F) being the best temperature for initial growth. X. oryzae can live in soil with pH range from 4–8.8; optimum pH being 6–6.50.

== Importance ==
Xanthomonas oryzae causes a potentially devastating disease. Found worldwide in temperate and tropical regions, it can destroy up to 80 percent of a crop if the disease develops early. Even if it develops late, it can nonetheless severely diminish the quality and yield of the grain.

Bacterial leaf blight is a prevalent and destructive disease which affects millions of hectares/acres throughout Asia. In Japan alone, annual losses are estimated to be between 22,000 and 110,000 tons. In the Philippines, susceptible varieties lose up to 22.5% of the total harvest during wet seasons and up to 7.2% in the dry season. In resistant crops, these numbers are, respectively, 9.5% and 1.8%.

== Management ==
Management of bacterial leaf blight is most commonly done by planting disease resistant rice plants. PSB Rc82 is the standard variety of rice used in Southeast Asia, and the use of this cultivar enables the harvest of an estimated 0.8 million metric tons of rice per cropping season that would have otherwise been lost to bacterial leaf blight. Macassane, a new variety released in 2011, has been shown to have improved resistance to bacterial leaf blight and is being used currently in Mozambique.

Traditional treatments, such as the applications of copper compounds or antibiotics, are largely ineffective in the control of bacterial leaf blight. Increasingly, rice is being genetically engineered for resistance to the disease, as treatment proves difficult. More than 30 genes have been identified as being associated with resistance to bacterial leaf blight, and have been given names Xa1 to Xa33.

Biological control methods are relatively recent developments which are not currently in common use. They may be used in the future to reduce damage done by bacterial leaf blight, with experimental data showing up to a 64% reduction in damage. Including the use of metabolic products isolated from fungus Paraphaeosphaeria minitans (syn. Coniothyrium minitans).

== Virulence ==
The first definite evidence of cost of virulence in any plant pathogen was discovered in this bacterium. Vera Cruz et al., 2000 find it is possible to find and quantify this subtype of evolutionary trade-off in Xoo. They do this by trialling Xoo isolates against rice isogenic lines with clones of avirulence genes to obtain the necessary precision.

== Resistance ==
In 2019, genes that enable host resistance to bacterial blight were engineered into rice, leading to more than ten resistant cultivars. They rely on resistance genes Xa4, xa5, xa13, Xa21, Xa33 and Xa38, and were released for commercial cultivation.

The OsSWEET13 transcription promoter is related to resistance in an unusual way. Zhou et al., 2015 knocks out OsSWEET13 using PthXo2 – a transcription activator-like effector nuclease (TALEN). Knockout produces a rice with resistance to Xoo.
