= Xanthomonas oryzae =

Scientific classification
- Domain: Bacteria
- Kingdom: Pseudomonadati
- Phylum: Pseudomonadota
- Class: Gammaproteobacteria
- Order: Lysobacterales
- Family: Lysobacteraceae
- Genus: Xanthomonas
- Species: X. oryzae

Binomial name
- Xanthomonas oryzae (Ishiyama 1922) Swings et al., 1990

Pathovars
- Xanthomonas oryzae pv. oryzae; Xanthomonas oryzae pv. oryzicola

Species of bacterium

Xanthomonas oryzae is a species of bacteria. The major host of the bacterium is rice.

The species contains two pathovars, neither of which is native to Europe: X. o. pv. oryzae and X. o. pv. oryzicola.

Xanthomonas oryzae epidemics can cause yield losses ranging from 2-74%, and the bacteria can be carried on rice seeds, causing further disease spread.

The host resistance gene, Xa21, from Oryza longistaminata, is integrated into the genome of Oryza sativa for its broad-range resistance to rice leaf blight caused by X. o. pv. oryzae.
