= Domsiah =

Iranian variety of rice

Domsiah (Persian: دم سیاه; also spelled domesiah) is an Iranian variety of rice. It is a long-grain rice, with a black spot on one end, which gives it the name, which is Persian meaning "black end". It is cultivated mainly in the Gilan province of Iran.

Researchers and scientists have not succeeded in bringing forth varieties which are resistant to fungi and stem borer and still have the aroma of Domsiah and the other related local aromatic rice varieties, of which the most popular besides Domsiah are Tarom Hashemi, Binam, Hasani, Salari, Ambarboo and Sang Tarom and Hasan Sarai. More than 80% of the rice area in Iran are under these varieties.

== Diseases and shortcomings ==
Domsiah and the other rice varieties have droopy leaves and a weak culm and are therefore prone to loding (falling down on the ground). They are susceptible to blast (fungi) and stem borer (insects).

== See also ==
- Oryza sativa
