= Kheti Virasat Mission =

Kheti Virasat Mission (KVM) is a non-profit, civil society action group founded in 2005. It works in the field of sustainable agriculture, conservation of natural resources, environmental health and eco-sustainable technologies.

KVM is registered as a trust, with head office at Jaitu, Faridkot, Punjab.
