= LGT Group =

Private banking and asset management group based in Liechtenstein

- Trade name: LGT Group
- Formerly: The Liechtenstein Global Trust
- Type: Private
- Industry: Financial services
- Founded: November 22, 1920; 105 years ago
- Headquarters: Vaduz, Liechtenstein
- Number of locations: 40+
- Area served: Europe; Americas; Asia-Pacific; Middle East
- Key people: H.S.H. Prince Maximilian of Liechtenstein, Chairman LGT Group; Olivier de Perregaux, CEO LGT Private Banking
- Products: Private Banking, Asset management, Private equity, Wealth management, Real estate investing, Impact investing
- AUM: CHF 386.1 billion
- Owner: House of Liechtenstein
- Number of employees: 6000 (2025)
- Website: www.lgt.com

LGT Group is a private banking and asset management group that has been fully controlled by the Liechtenstein Princely Family for over 90 years. As of 31 December 2025, LGT managed assets of CHF 386.1 billion for private individuals and institutional clients. LGT employs around 6,000 staff across over 40 locations in Europe, Asia, the Americas, Australia and the Middle East.

== History ==
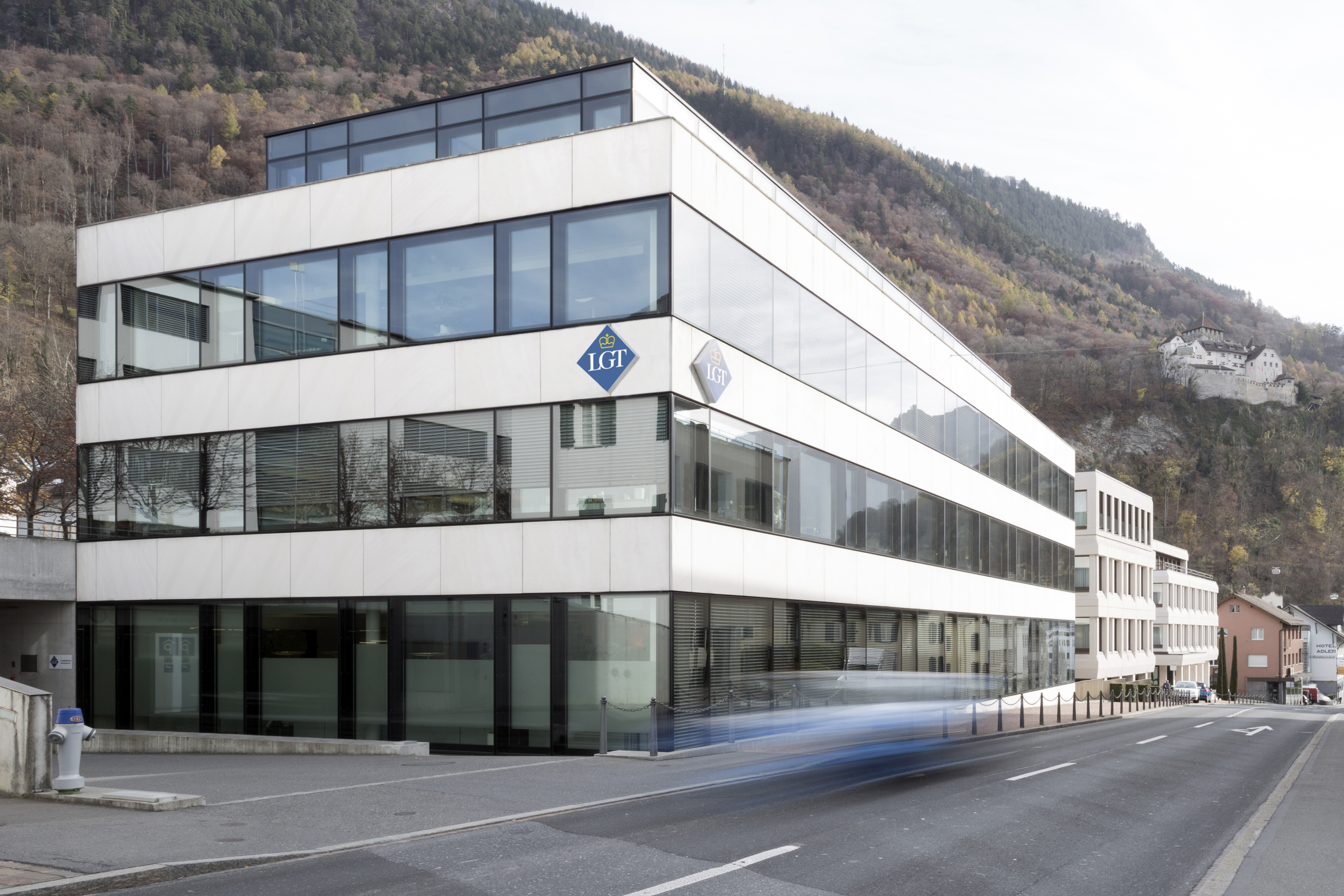
LGT Private Banking Vaduz

=== Foundation and early years ===
The founding of the bank happened during an economic shift in Europe. The Austrian currency was legal tender in Liechtenstein, but after the collapse of the Austro-Hungarian Empire, its currency plummeted. The Swiss franc was introduced in 1919, and became legal tender in Liechtenstein in 1924 (plans for a national currency were dropped). The Bank of Liechtenstein Aktiengesellschaft (short: BIL; renamed LGT Group in 1996) was founded in 1920 on the initiative of the Princely House of Liechtenstein together with industrialists and financiers from the former Austro-Hungarian Empire, who were seeking new financial structures after the collapse of the monarchy. The Anglo-Austrian Bank received the concession to establish the bank from the Liechtenstein government on 30 August 1920, and was the majority stakeholder. Count Karl Trauttmanssdorf was its first chairman. The establishment of the bank played an important role in the development of Liechtenstein as a centre for international holding structures. In May 1921, BIL launched its operations with 10 employees based in ground-floor offices inside the main government building. In 1930, the Princely House of Liechtenstein acquired more than 90% of the shares in the bank. In 1933, the bank moved into the newly constructed town hall in Vaduz, and in 1960 it relocated to its own new building in Vaduz.

The bank survived World War II thanks to prudent business practices. Until the 1960s, the bank’s main focus was to support and provide financing for the expansion of Liechtenstein’s economy and business sector. BIL did so primarily through the provision of financial services and loans. Over time, however, the commercial opportunities available to it in the local economy became too narrow, leading it to grow its operations to become an international commercial bank. Following this transformation, BIL began to expand into various segments of the banking industry, with a particular focus on activities pertaining to mortgages, stock markets and foreign exchange.

In 1964, conventional data processing based on the punch card system was introduced, which was replaced by electronic data processing as early as 1969. In the early 1970s, screens were used at workstations for the first time.

In 1970, the bank's share capital was taken over by the recently established Prince of Liechtenstein Foundation.

=== Expansion ===
During the 1980s, BIL opened representative offices in Europe, the US and Asia, including in London, which was its first foreign business base, and in Hong Kong in 1986.

In 1986, BIL went public and in 1989, acquired GT Management PLC in London. In 1990, BIL GT Group AG was founded and H.S.H. Prince Philipp became Chairman of the Board of Directors. Six years later, BIL GT Group was renamed Liechtenstein Global Trust and BIL became LGT Bank in Liechtenstein AG. In 1998, the GT Asset Management division was sold and the bank went private. From the late 1990s onwards, LGT focused on private banking and asset management.

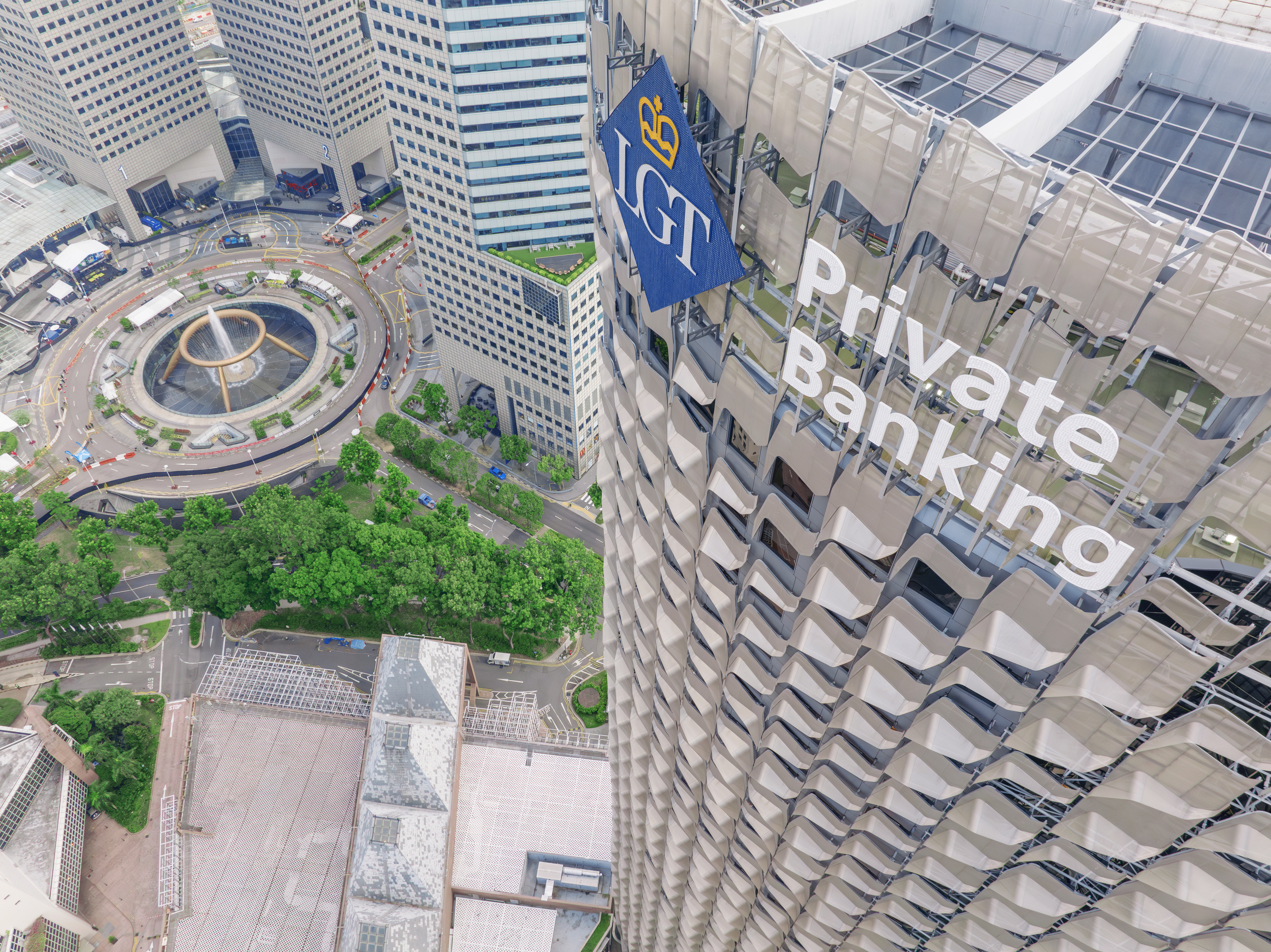
LGT Building Singapore

In the years that followed, LGT expanded its onshore business in its core European markets as well as in international growth markets, including through a foreign branch in Singapore. A representative office was also opened in Frankfurt. In 2003, LGT acquired Schweizerische Treuhandgesellschaft STG from Swiss Life, opened LGT Bank Deutschland & Co. OHG and was granted a banking license in Singapore. Over the next four years, it launched LGT Bank Switzerland and opened LGT Bank Österreich. In 2006, H.S.H. Prince Maximilian von und zu Liechtenstein became CEO and Chairman of the LGT Group Foundation in 2021.

LGT Venture Philanthropy, an independent charitable foundation, was founded in 2007, on the initiative of LGT CEO H.S.H. Prince Maximilian von und zu Liechtenstein. In 2009, LGT sold its trust and fiduciary division (LGT Treuhand) to First Advisory Group and acquired the Swiss operation of Dresdner Bank.

In April 2011, the German financial supervisory authority (BaFin) blocked the sale of BHF-Bank to LGT "due to concerns regarding the prospective buyer", which were said to have arisen during the statutory owner control procedure. As a result, LGT Group withdrew from Germany. In December 2011, LGT announced that the German private bank Delbrück Bethmann Maffei would acquire 100 per cent of the shares in LGT Bank Deutschland. In 2011, LGT Group was granted a banking licence for Hong Kong. In the years that followed, LGT opened a branch in Salzburg, Austria (2012), as well as LGT Middle East in Dubai (2013).

Between 2012 and 2017, LGT acquired several new portfolios and operations, including Clariden Leu’s ILS boutique (2012), a private banking portfolio from HSBC in Switzerland (2014), a majority stake in London-based wealth management partnership Vestra Wealth (2016), the private banking operations of ABN AMRO Asia in Asia and the Middle East (2016) and European Capital Fund Management (2017).

In 2019, LGT opened a branch in Thailand (LGT Securities Thailand) and also entered the Indian market through the acquisition of a majority stake in Validus Wealth. Later that year, the group acquired Aspada, an India-focused investment fund previously owned by the Soros Economic Development Fund (SEDF) of George Soros as a sole shareholder, to expand its impact investing platform LGT Lightstone. Also in 2019, LGT Group announced its intention to open an office in Germany again. In 2022, the group decided to open a new office in Hamburg, while Munich was designated as the headquarters for its German operations. In 2024, the company further expanded its presence in Germany with additional locations in Düsseldorf, Cologne and Frankfurt.

=== Restructuring and new developments ===
Between 2020 and 2021, the business units of LGT Group were reorganised and have since operated as independent companies. The private banking business has since been managed by LGT Private Banking, while the asset management activities operate under the LGT Capital Partners brand. The impact investing division was transferred to Lightrock (formerly Lightstone). According to the company’s management, the separation was necessary in order to enable a more targeted focus on the respective markets, particularly in view of the growth in these areas in previous years.

In December 2021, LGT acquired the Australia-based firm Crestone Wealth Management (former UBS Wealth Management Australia until 2016, approximately AUD$25 billion in assets under management) for $338 millions. The acquisition was completed in 2022. In addition, a branch was opened in Tokyo.

Also in 2021, the wealth management business of UBS Europe SE in Austria was acquired. In 2023, LGT took over the wealth management business of Abrdn in the United Kingdom.

In November 2024, LGT announced that it would acquire the private advice business of the Commonwealth Bank of Australia (CBA).

== Corporate structure ==
LGT is a private banking and asset management group that is wholly owned by the Princely Family of Liechtenstein. The ultimate parent entity of the group is the LGT Group Foundation, which holds the shares on behalf of the Princely Family of Liechtenstein.

As an umbrella organisation, LGT employs around 6,000 staff across over 40 locations in Europe, Asia, Australia, Americas and the Middle East. The group operates through several individual entities that are active in the business sectors private banking, asset management and impact investing. The private banking activities are conducted under the LGT Private Banking brand, while the asset management activities are carried out by LGT Capital Partners. The group’s impact investing activities are managed through the independent investment platform Lightrock.

The individual entities include:

Entity	Headquarters	Locations
LGT Bank AG	Liechtenstein, Vaduz	Vaduz, Bendern, Zurich, Geneva, Lugano, Chur, Davos
LGT Bank (Schweiz) AG	Switzerland, Basel	Basel, Berne, Zurich, Lugano, Geneva, Dubai
LGT Bank AG, German Branch	Germany, Munich	Munich, Hamburg, Düsseldorf, Cologne, Frankfurt
LGT Bank AG, Austria Branch	Austria, Vienna	Vienna, Salzburg
LGT Bank (Singapore) Ltd.	Singapore, Singapore	Singapore
LGT Bank (Hong Kong)	Hong Kong, Hong Kong	Hong Kong
LGT Capital Partners AG	Switzerland, Pfäffikon SZ	Pfäffikon, New York, San Francisco, Dublin, London, Frankfurt, The Hague, Luxembourg, Paris, Dubai, Beijing, Hong Kong, Tokyo, Sydney
LGT Capital Partners (FL) AG	Liechtenstein, Vaduz	Vaduz
LGT Wealth Management UK	United Kingdom,London	London, Bristol, Birmingham, Leeds, Edinburgh, Jersey, Manchester
LGT Wealth Management Australia	Australia, Adelaide	Adelaide, Brisbane, Melbourne, Sydney
Lightrock	Switzerland, Zurich	Zurich
LGT Venture Philanthropy	Switzerland, Zurich	Zurich
LGT Financial Services AG	Liechtenstein, Vaduz	Bendern
Additional locations:		Bahrain, Ireland, Japan, Thailand, India

== Services ==
LGT offers a range of services in the areas of private banking and asset management. Its main clients include family wealth holders and corporate clients.

In addition to traditional investment services, LGT’s offering for private investors also includes supplementary services such as wealth planning, real estate financing, impact investments and philanthropy advisory. LGT also offers investments that consider sustainability criteria.

For institutional investors, LGT offers asset management services, investment funds and investment mandates. Through LGT Capital Partners, more than 700 institutional clients in over 40 countries are served.

== Sustainability ==
In line with the Paris Agreement, LGT announced a target to reduce emissions by 2030. The bank has not invested in companies that extract coal or produce coal-based electricity since 2020. It also does not invest in companies that manufacture or sell controversial weapons.

In 2022, LGT joined the Finance for Biodiversity Pledge, the Principles for Responsible Investment and the Institutional Investors Group on Climate Change. It also maintains partnerships with the UNEP Finance Initiative, the UN Global Compact and the London-based Institutional Investors Group on Climate Change (IIGCC).

=== LGT Venture Philanthropy ===
LGT Venture Philanthropy (LGT VP) is an independent, charitable foundation established in 2007, headquartered in Switzerland with additional locations in Africa and India. The foundation’s mission is to contribute to improving the living conditions of disadvantaged populations, to promote the protection of ecosystems and to support the development of communities.

To achieve these aims, LGT VP collaborates with local organisations in the areas of health, agriculture, poverty reduction, education, children and youth, women and girls, and the environment. The foundation provides multi-year funding and maintains long-term partnerships. It primarily invests in organisations based in developing countries such as Africa, Asia, India, and Latin America. In 2012, LGT Venture Philanthropy launched the Accelerator Program, to invest in social enterprises in China.

Since inception, LGT VP has invested in 36 organizations in six regions across the world, which have improved the lives of over 4.5 million less advantaged people.

==== LGT Impact Fellowship ====
A limited number of professionals across sectors are nominated each year for the LGT Impact Fellowship. Fellows work full-time for one year with the organisations and companies supported by LGT in Latin America, Africa, India and Europe.

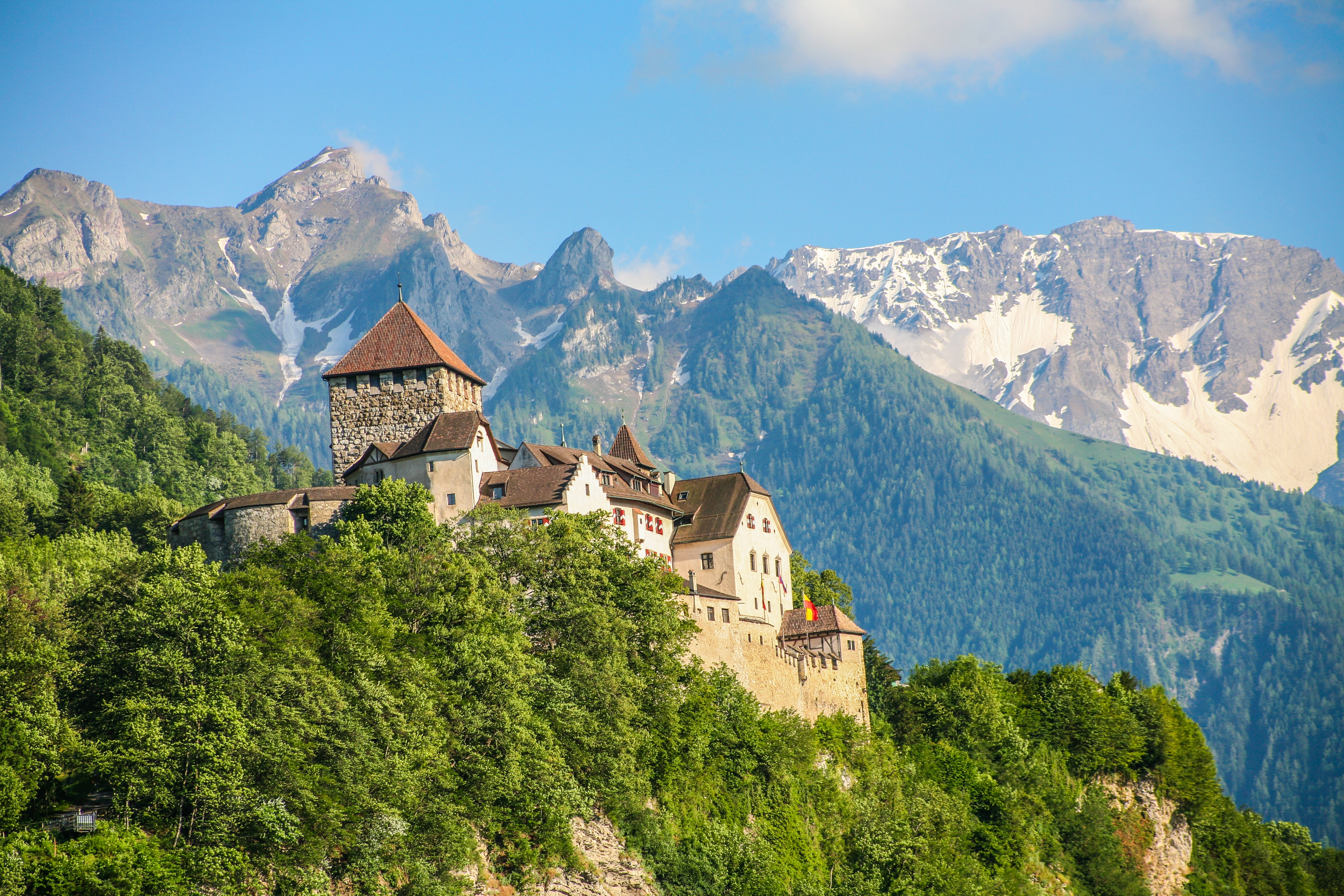
Vaduz Castle, the official residence of the Princely Family of Liechtenstein

== Engagement ==
LGT supports the Princely Collections, a private collection of European art owned by the Princely Family of Liechtenstein.

LGT also supports the ensemble LGT Young Soloists, formed of string musicians (aged between 12 and 23). The ensemble performs in concert halls such as the Elbphilharmonie and released recordings with Sony Music/RCA Red Seal.

The company is a partner of the Liechtenstein Ski Association. LGT is also involved in curling and regularly sponsors European and World Championships organised by the World Curling Federation. Finally, LGT is an official partner of the Champions Hockey League.

== Controversy ==
Several hundred clients of LGT Treuhand, a former subsidiary of LGT Group, came under scrutiny by German tax investigators in February 2008, based on information contained on a CD that had been acquired by the German intelligence service, the Bundesnachrichtendienst. According to government sources, the case involved a four-digit number of suspects who were alleged to have evaded taxes amounting to millions. A spokesperson for the then Federal Minister of Finance, Peer Steinbrück, stated that investigations were being conducted against "very, very many well-known and less well-known 'high achievers' for tax evasion involving Liechtenstein". The information was also forwarded to many other European countries as well as to Australia, leading to successful investigations there as well. The German Ministry of Finance advised those affected to make a voluntary disclosure, as provided for under German criminal law. The public prosecutor’s office in Bochum confirmed that several hundred criminal proceedings were pending with the authority. According to Handelsblatt, large quantities of documents from LGT Treuhand had been transmitted.

The bank confirmed in a press release that a "data theft" had taken place at the subsidiary in 2002. On its website, it described the course of events and referred to the suspected perpetrator, the Liechtenstein national Heinrich Kieber, who had already been wanted previously.

On 16 December 2010, the criminal proceedings against LGT Group and LGT Treuhand were discontinued in return for a payment of around €46 million. This did not constitute an admission of guilt. Reuters described the discontinuation of the proceedings as a form of indulgence payment.

== Awards (Selection) ==
- 2024, 2025: Sustainable Finance Award presented by Global Finance magazine.
- 2024, 2025: Global Private Banking Award presented by Euromoney magazine.
- 2024: PWM/The Banker Global Private Banking Award presented by The Banker magazine.

Rating: Standard & Poor's (2025) / Moody's (2026)

- A+ / Aa2
