= Pseudoxanthomonas =

Scientific classification
- Domain: Bacteria
- Kingdom: Pseudomonadati
- Phylum: Pseudomonadota
- Class: Gammaproteobacteria
- Order: Lysobacterales
- Family: Lysobacteraceae
- Genus: Pseudoxanthomonas; Finkmann et al. 2000

Species
- Pseudoxanthomonas broegbernensis Pseudoxanthomonas daejeonensis Pseudoxanthomonas dokdonensis Pseudoxanthomonas gei Pseudoxanthomonas indica Pseudoxanthomonas japonensis Pseudoxanthomonas kalamensis Pseudoxanthomonas kaohsiungensis Pseudoxanthomonas koreensis Pseudoxanthomonas mexicana Pseudoxanthomonas sacheonensis Pseudoxanthomonas sangjuensis Pseudoxanthomonas spadix Pseudoxanthomonas suwonensis Pseudoxanthomonas taiwanensis Pseudoxanthomonas wuyuanensis Pseudoxanthomonas yeongjuensis

Genus of bacteria

Pseudoxanthomonas is a genus of Gram-negative bacteria in the family Lysobacteraceae from the phylum Pseudomonadota. This genus is closely related phylogenetically with the genera Xanthomonas, Xylella, and Stenotrophomonas. The genus was first distinguished in 2000 in biofilter samples, and was later emended by Lee et al. Some of the species in this genus are: P. mexicana, P. japonensis, P. koreensis, P. daejeonensis, and the type species P. broegbernensis.

Pseudoxanthomonas species exhibit an aptitude for growth in hostile chemical environments as evidenced by many studies. Several Pseudoxanthomonas strains have been isolated from hydrocarbon contaminated sites and show the ability to degrade polycyclic aromatic hydrocarbons such as chrysene, phenanthrene and pyrene. Pseudoxanthomonas kaohsiungensis has been isolated from an oil-polluted site. Reveling this isolate displayed an ability to produce extracellular biosurfactants that can significantly reduce medium surface tension enabling bacterial growth on hydrophobic carbon sources such as olive oil.

Certain Pseudoxanthomonas strains show strong tolerance to heavy metals; for example, Pseudoxanthomonas spadix ZSY-33 can withstand elevated copper concentrations using metal-resistance systems such as the Cus and Cop pathways. Some Pseudoxanthomonas mexicana isolates show plant growth promoting traits and tolerance to arsenic; reported activities include auxin production, hydrogen cyanide production and nitrogen fixation that improved plant growth in contaminated soils.
