= Bacterial leaf spot of peppers and tomato =

Species of bacterium

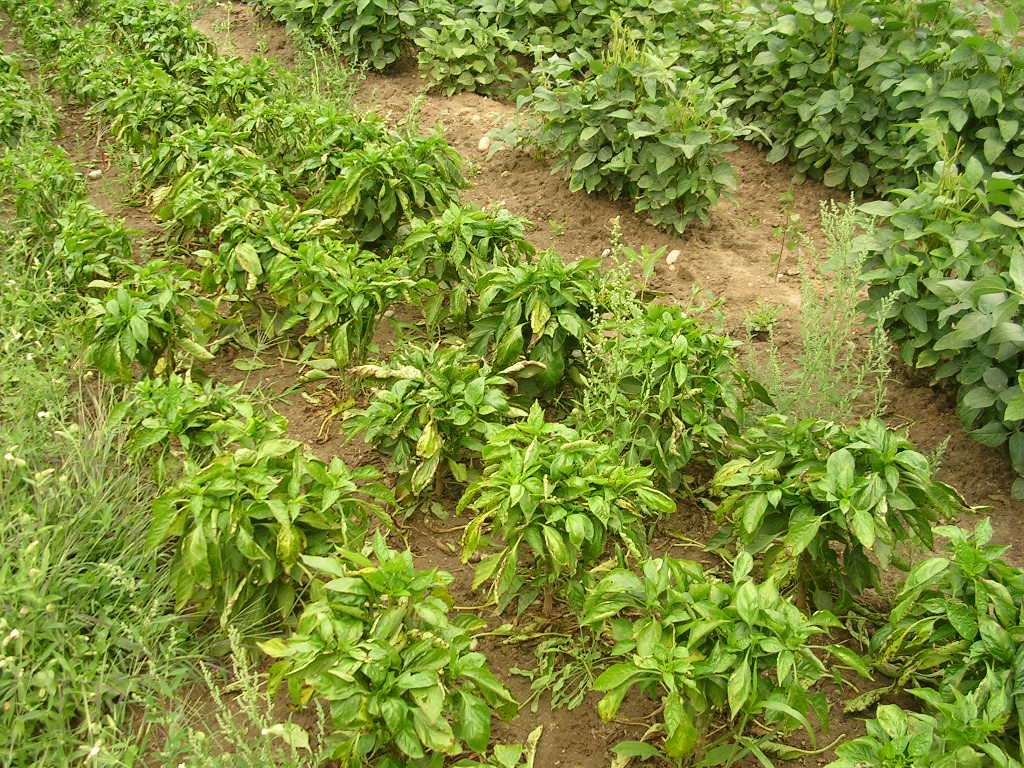
Bacterial leaf spot on pepper plants

Bacterial leaf spot on peppers and tomatoes is caused by a gram-negative and rod-shaped bacterium in the genus Xanthomonas. It causes symptoms throughout the above-ground portion of the plant including leaf spots, fruit spots and stem cankers. There are four pathovars classified in three different species that can cause this disease, named by alphabetical groups. Nevertheless, the prevention and treatment is very similar: since this bacterium cannot live in soil for more than a few weeks and survives as inoculum on plant debris, removal of dead plant material and chemical applications to living plants are considered effective control mechanisms.

== Classification ==
It was once believed that a single strain of Xanthomonas campestris pv. vesicatoria was responsible for leaf spot disease on peppers and tomatoes. However, by 2004 it is known that there are four different phenotypic groups within the Xanthomonas genus that are pathogenic.

Classification of the Xanthomonas species that cause bacterial leaf spot underwent a significant change in the early 2000s. Later changes have changed species while keeping the old name as a pathovar, so they are easier to keep track of.

Causative agents of bacterial leaf spot of pepper and tomato
Group	Current nomenclature	2000s nomenclature	1980 nomenclature	Other synonyms
A	X. euvesicatoria pv. euvesicatoria (Jones et al.) Constantin et al. 2016	X. euvesicatoria Jones et al. 2006	X. campestris pv. vesicatoria (Doidge) Dye 1980	
B	X. vesicatoria	X. vesicatoria (ex Doidge 1920) Vauterin et al. 1995	X. campestris pv. vesicatoria (Doidge) Dye 1980	
C	X. euvesicatoria pv. perforans (Jones et al.) Constantin et al. 2016	X. perforans Jones et al. 2006	X. campestris pv. vesicatoria (Doidge) Dye 1980	
D	X. hortorum pv. gardneri (Jones et al.) Morinière et al. 2020	X. gardneri (ex Ŝutić) Jones et al. 2006	X. campestris pv. vesicatoria (Doidge) Dye 1980	X. cynarae pv. gardneri (Jones et al.) Timilsina et al. 2019

For a more complete account of the period leading up to the 2000s nomenclature, consult the "Taxonomy" section of EFSA (2014), specifically "Table 1" of the section.

== Hosts and symptoms ==
=== Hosts ===
The principal hosts of BLS causing xanthomonads are tomatoes and peppers, though other incidental hosts have been recorded, mainly weeds. Group A contains most of the pepper infecting strains, though some strains from groups B and D have also been reported to cause symptoms on pepper plants. Strains from all four groups have been isolated from infected tomato plants. Some strains are able to infect both pepper and tomato plants, while some can only infect one of these plants.

=== Symptoms ===
Bacterial leaf spot affects all above ground parts of the plant:

==== Fruit ====
Pepper fruit do not frequently show symptoms, largely due to the fact that developing fruit is often dropped if the pepper plant is infected. Fruit that isn't dropped can also be damaged and misshapen due to increased sun exposure after plants drop infected leaves. When symptoms on the fruit do occur, they start as pale-green, water-soaked areas and eventually become raised, brown, and rough.

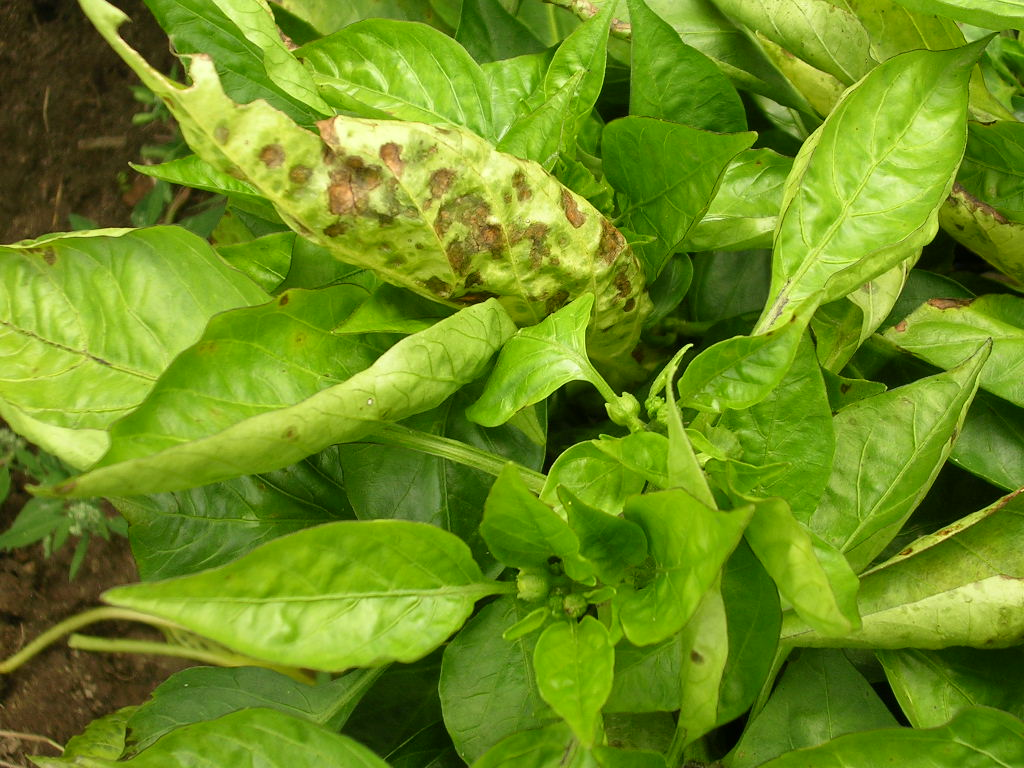
Bacterial leaf spot symptoms

==== Leaves and stems ====
Bacterial colonization of intracellular spaces induces the macroscopically visible symptoms including water-soaked lesions on the leaves that later become necrotic. Though these spots start out at about .24 inches in diameter, they increase in size and number, eventually causing the leaves to drop off. Plants can drop 50–100% of their foliage. BLS can also affect the stems of plants, leading to elongated, raised, light-brown cankers, less than .25 inch long. (5) Defoliation occurs more commonly in pepper plants than tomatoes, so tomato plants with bacterial leaf spot often have a scorched appearance due to their diseased leaves.

== Disease cycle ==
Xanthomonas campestris pv. vesicatoria survives on tomato and pepper plants, seeds, and debris from infected plants as it cannot live in the soil for more than a few weeks. The bacterium can also be found in association with wheat roots and some weed species which are both considered sources of inoculum as well as diseased tomato and pepper plants. In cold climates, Xanthomonas campestris pv. vesicatoria infection is mostly caused by contaminated seed material, both on and inside of seeds. If it survives on seeds, it will infect the cotyledons of the growing plant as it emerges from the seed coat. Internally infected seeds will produce diseased plants from the point of germination. Systemic symptoms such as wilting, yellowing, and dwarfing are not typical of plants infected at the point of germination. However, foliage loss can happen when localized symptoms on leaves become severe. If the bacterium survives on debris, it may infect healthy plants through stomata as well as wounds on leaves and fruit. It is spread by direct contact of plants with debris, human movement of the bacteria from debris to plants, and can easily travel from debris to healthy plants through saturated soils via water movement. Once infected, plants begin to develop lesions on the leaves as well as fruit, becoming inoculum sources for further infection.

== Environment ==
Environment plays a large role in bacterial spot of pepper and tomato. The bacterium requires high levels of humidity to such an extent that infected plants may not begin to show symptoms until several days after infection if ambient humidity is low. Xanthomonas campestris pv. vesicatoria is a large problem in greenhouses and nurseries where very high humidity and warm temperatures provide a good environment for the bacteria to grow and wet soils easily transmit the disease from plant to plant. Overcrowding in propagation facilities also increases the likelihood of spreading this disease when an infected plant comes into physical contact with its neighbors.

== Management ==
Bacterial spot of pepper and tomato can spread extremely quickly with infected plants showing symptoms 3–5 days after exposure to the pathogen. Starting with one infected plant, susceptible neighboring plants can show symptoms in as little as two weeks and an entire field can become diseased in as little as ten weeks. There are currently several methods of control, some of which are more effective than others.

In the 1950s, the antibiotic streptomycin was used extensively to control the spread of Xanthomonas campestris pv. vesicatoria. However, the bacteria developed resistant strains and widespread antibiotic application is no longer an effective method of control.

Some of the strain that cause this disease have as little as 70% of their DNA in common which makes breeding for resistance extremely difficult. While there has been some research made into finding resistant varieties of host plants, success has been limited due to the variation in the pathogen.

Xanthomonas campestris pv. vesicatoria does not survive well in decayed plant material therefore removal of debris and crop rotation are two good methods for preventing the spread of this bacterium. Another important management method is to eliminate volunteer plants (plants that grow without being specifically planted or managed by farmers) as wild pepper and tomato plants can harbor the disease in warmer climates.

Currently, the most effective treatment for bacterial spot of pepper and tomato is a combination of chemical applications. Diseased seeds may be treated with sodium hypochlorite, calcium hypochlorite, or trisodium phosphate to kill bacteria on the surface of the seed. Treating internal seed infection is harder but can be done with other chemical or heat treatments. Infected fields are treated with multiple application approach involving spraying a mixture of copper and mancozeb, which prevents further infection and kills a variety of pathogens present at the time of spraying. Finally, there is some research being done into the foliar application of bacteriophages (viruses that infect bacteria) to control the disease but this approach has been met with some resistance and is not currently a widely used method.

== Importance ==
Bacterial leaf spot occurs throughout the world where conditions are relatively warm and moist. Though it can occur across the United States, BLS is most common in the Northeast, where it is the most common and destructive disease of peppers. BLS is a very economically important disease for tomato and pepper producers because it affects all above ground parts of the plant. Yield is reduced because foliage loss reduces plant productivity. Foliage loss also leaves fruit vulnerable to sunscald, further reducing yield. In addition to problems caused by leaf damage, BLS can cause lesions to appear on the fruit itself reducing quality for sale fresh and also for processing. Fruit drop can also be caused in plants infected early in their development. Farmers of commercial pepper fields will sometimes even destroy an entire pepper crop if BLS is detected early in the season due to how difficult and costly the disease can be to combat.
