= Xanthomonas cucurbitae =

Scientific classification
- Domain: Bacteria
- Kingdom: Pseudomonadati
- Phylum: Pseudomonadota
- Class: Gammaproteobacteria
- Order: Lysobacterales
- Family: Lysobacteraceae
- Genus: Xanthomonas
- Species: X. cucurbitae

Binomial name
- Xanthomonas cucurbitae (Bryan 1926) Vauterin et al. 1995

Species of bacterium that is a plant pathogen

Xanthomonas cucurbitae is a species of Gram-negative bacteria that is a plant pathogen. It is the causal agent of bacterial spot disease of cucurbits, infecting plants like pumpkins, squash, and cucumbers.

The disease can cause significant yield losses in commercial crops—up to 100% in some fields—particularly in pumpkin production in the Midwestern United States. The bacterium was first identified on 'Hubbard squash' in New York in 1926. It has since been found worldwide, with the first confirmed report in Europe occurring in Reggio Emilia, Italy, in 2018.

== Hosts and symptoms ==
Xanthomonas cucurbitae infects various members of the cucurbit family. In an outbreak in Italy, it was identified on pumpkin cultivars Cucurbita moschata cv. Violina and Cucurbita maxima cv. Mantovana. The same outbreak also saw symptoms on watermelon, although only on the leaves.

- On leaves, symptoms appear as small, round-to-angular beige lesions that are surrounded by yellow halos. These can merge to form larger necrotic areas as the disease progresses.
- On fruits, the bacteria cause small, circular, and slightly sunken beige lesions, initially 1 to 3 mm in diameter, with a brown halo. In later stages, these spots can expand to 10–15 mm and may be colonized by secondary fungi or bacteria, leading to fruit rot.

The pathogen is known to be seedborne, capable of surviving in infected seeds for over 24 months. It can also survive in infected leaf and fruit debris for a similar duration, which acts as a primary source for future infections. In contrast, studies have shown the bacterium does not persist for long periods in soil that is free of plant debris.

The pathogen can also survive as an epiphyte on numerous weed species, which can harbor the bacteria without showing symptoms. Of these, burcucumber (Sicyos angulatus) and velvetleaf (Abutilon theophrasti) have been identified as hosts that can develop Xanthomonas leaf spot, potentially serving as an inoculum reservoir in pumpkin fields.

The international trade of pumpkin seeds is a suspected pathway for its introduction to new regions.

== Management ==
Management of bacterial spot disease relies on an integrated approach combining cultural practices and chemical applications. Using certified, disease-free seed is a critical first step, as the pathogen is seedborne. Crop rotation with non-cucurbit crops for three or more years can significantly reduce disease severity and delay its development, although it does not prevent the disease entirely on its own. Shorter, two-year rotations have been found to be ineffective at reducing severity. Control of weeds that can act as alternative hosts, such as burcucumber and velvetleaf, is also an important management consideration.

Application of copper-based bactericides is a primary method of chemical control. However, this approach is not always sufficient to control the disease satisfactorily and raises concerns about the potential development of copper-resistant strains of X. cucurbitae.

== Environmental conditions ==
The bacterium grows in a wide range of temperatures. Its optimal temperature for colony development is between 24 and 30 °C (75 and 86 °F), with a minimum temperature of 4–6 °C (39–43 °F) and a maximum of 34–36 °C (93–97 °F). The optimal pH for growth is between 6.5 and 8.0.

== Genomics ==
The first reference-quality whole-genome sequence of the X. cucurbitae type isolate (ATCC 23378) was published in 2021. The genome consists of a single circular chromosome of approximately 4.6 million base pairs and one plasmid.

Comparative genomic analysis revealed that X. cucurbitae has a smaller genome and fewer predicted virulence-related genes—particularly type III effectors—than most other characterized Xanthomonas species. Phylogenetic analysis places it as most closely related to the species X. codiaei, X. cassavae, and X. floridensis.

== Virulence mechanisms ==
The ability of X. cucurbitae to cause disease depends on several virulence factors, most notably proteins secreted by the Type II (T2SS) and Type III (T3SS) secretion systems.

- The T2SS secretes enzymes that degrade the host's cell walls, such as cellulases and proteases. These enzymes help the bacteria colonize host tissue and acquire nutrients. Unusually for a non-vascular pathogen, X. cucurbitae shows significant cellulase activity, which may help it penetrate the tough rinds of fruits like pumpkins.
- The T3SS acts like a molecular syringe, injecting effector proteins directly into the host plant's cells. These effectors manipulate the host's cellular processes and suppress its immune responses, allowing the infection to proceed.

Experiments have shown that both the T2SS and T3SS are essential for X. cucurbitae to cause full disease symptoms on its host.
