= Slime flux =

Bacterial disease of trees

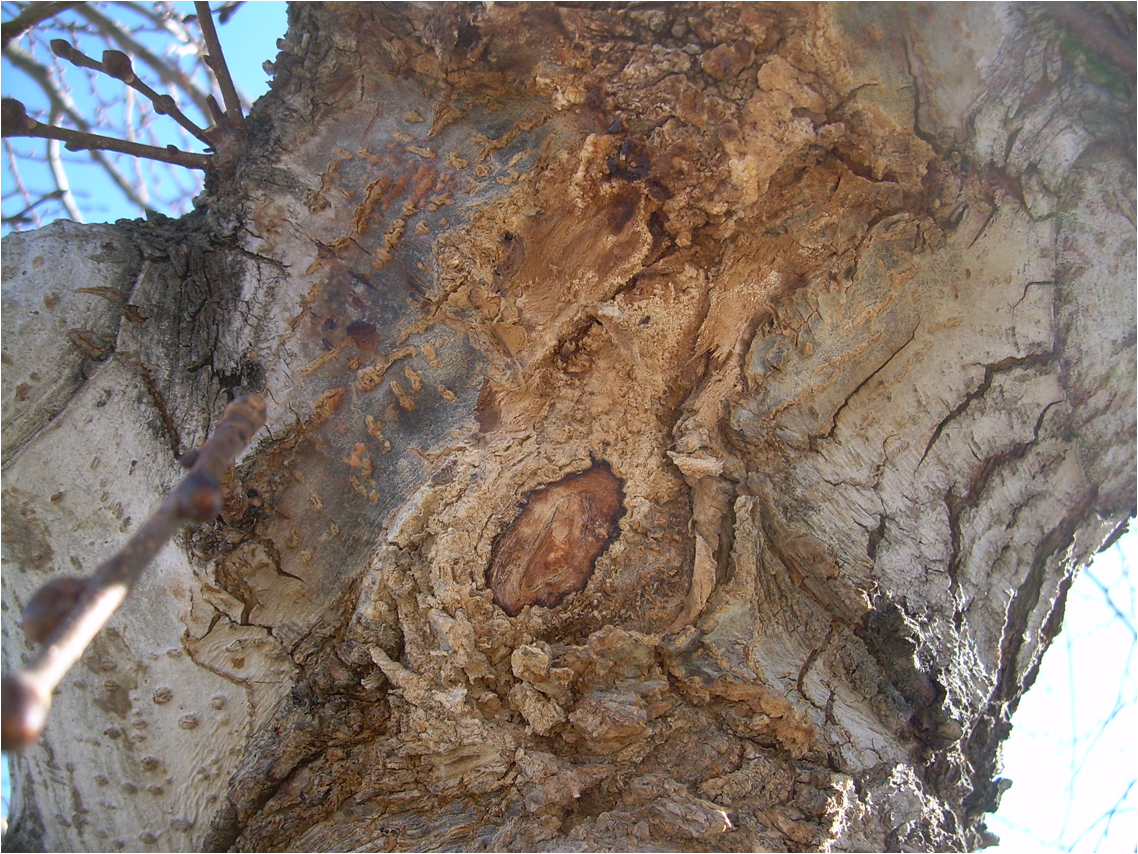
- Slime flux on a Camperdown Elm caused by Pectobacterium carotovorum. Note the ooze (dark ring in the center) and the discoloration of the bark.
- Causal agents: Bacteria (Brevundimonas bullata, Paracoccus alcaliphilus, P. marcusii and Luteimonas aestuarii, and Pectobacterium carotovorum)
- Hosts: Trees (elm, cottonwood, poplar, boxelder, ash, aspen, fruitless mulberry and oak)
- EPPO Code: ERWICA

Slime flux, also known as bacterial slime or bacterial wetwood, is a bacterial disease of certain trees, primarily elm, cottonwood, poplar, boxelder, ash, aspen, fruitless mulberry and oak. A wound to the bark, caused by pruning, insects, poor branch angles or natural cracks and splits, causes sap to ooze from the wound. Bacteria may infect this sap causing it to darken and stain the bark, eventually taking on a foamy appearance and unpleasant odor. This slimy ooze becomes toxic to the bark and eats into the tree. The fermented sap attracts insects like flies, ants, and maggots.

== Cause ==
Slime flux occurs when a wound is made in a tree trunk through things such as natural growth cracks, frost, insects, birds, lawn mowers, cat scratches, or pruning wounds, which causal bacteria can enter. Once inside the xylem, the internal pressure of the tree is raised, from the normal range of 5 to 10 psi (0.3 to 0.7 bar) up to 60 psi (4 bar), due to bacteria fermenting and emitting a gas mixture of methane, nitrogen, carbon dioxide, and oxygen. This accumulation of liquid and gas causes that part of the tree to have a damp, dark brown appearance known as wetwood. Eventually, the pressure will cause the sap and gasses to burst through the xylem and out of cracks in the trunk and ooze down the side of the tree. This sap flux may be further infected by other pathogens once exposed to the air such as air-borne bacteria, yeast, and other fungi, at which point it is known as slime flux.

=== Causal agents ===
Causal bacteria for the initial wetwood varies depending on the species of tree. The bacteria are commonly found in water and soils. Enterobacter spp., Bacillus spp., Pseudomonas spp. Xanthomonas spp., Agrobacterium spp., Acinetobacter spp., Corynebacterium spp., Bacteroides spp., Clostridium spp., Edwardsiella spp., Klebsiella spp., Lactobacillus spp., Methanobacterium spp., Brevundimonas bullata, Paracoccus spp. and Luteimonas aestuarii have been isolated from wetwood in various tree species.

Species of Prototheca have been isolated from slime fluxes.

== Potentially affected plants ==
Plants which are known to be affected by slime flux
Family	Genus	Species	Notes
Altingiaceae	Liquidambar		
Asparagaceae	Cordyline		In the United Kingdom, the Royal Horticultural Society noted an increase in the number of affected Cordyline following the cold winter of 2010/2011.
Betulaceae	Betula (birch)		Paper birches are known to be affected.
Elaeagnaceae	Elaeagnus	E. angustifolia (Russian-olive)	
Cornaceae	Cornus (dogwood)		
Fabaceae	Cercis (redbud)		
Fabaceae	Prosopis		Mesquites are known to be affected.
Fabaceae	Robinia	R. pseudoacacia (black locust)	
Fagaceae	Fagus (beech)		
Fagaceae	Quercus (oak)		White oaks are known to be affected.
Juglandaceae	Carya (hickory)		
Juglandaceae	Juglans (walnut)	J. cinerea (butternut)	
Magnoliaceae	Liriodendron (tulip tree)		
Magnoliaceae	Magnolia		
Malvaceae	Tilia (lime, linden)		
Moraceae	Morus (mulberry)		
Nyssaceae	Nyssa	N. sylvatica (sourgum)	
Oleaceae	Fraxinus (ash)		
Pinaceae	Abies (fir)		
Pinaceae	Pinus (pine)		
Pinaceae	Tsuga (hemlock)		
Platanaceae	Platanus	Platanus × hispanica (London plane)	
Ranunculaceae	Clematis		In the United Kingdom, Clematis are the plants most commonly affected by slime flux.
Rosaceae	Malus (apple; crabapple)	M. domestica (apple) (apple).	
Rosaceae	Prunus (cherry; plum)		
Rosaceae	Sorbus		
Salicaceae	Populus (poplar; aspen; cottonwood)	P. tomentosa	The majority of poplar species are known to be affected.
Salicaceae	Salix (willow)		
Sapindaceae	Acer (maple)	A. negundo (boxelder maple) A. saccharinum (silver maple)	
Sapindaceae	Aesculus (horse-chestnut)		
Ulmaceae	Ulmus (elm)	U. americana (American elm) U. parvifolia (Chinese elm) U. pumila (Siberian elm)	The majority of elm species are known to be affected.
