= Xanthomonas cassavae =

Scientific classification
- Domain: Bacteria
- Kingdom: Pseudomonadati
- Phylum: Pseudomonadota
- Class: Gammaproteobacteria
- Order: Lysobacterales
- Family: Lysobacteraceae
- Genus: Xanthomonas
- Species: X. cassavae

Binomial name
- Xanthomonas cassavae (Wiehe and Dowson 1953) Vauterin et al. 1995

Species of bacterium

Xanthomonas cassavae is a species of bacteria.
