= Pseudoxanthomonas daejeonensis =

Scientific classification
- Domain: Bacteria
- Kingdom: Pseudomonadati
- Phylum: Pseudomonadota
- Class: Gammaproteobacteria
- Order: Lysobacterales
- Family: Lysobacteraceae
- Genus: Pseudoxanthomonas
- Species: P. daejeonensis

Binomial name
- Pseudoxanthomonas daejeonensis Yang et al. 2005

Species of bacterium

Pseudoxanthomonas daejeonensis is a species of Gram-negative, non-spore-forming, rod-shaped bacteria, first isolated from ginseng fields. TR6-08(T) (=KCTC 12207(T)=IAM 15115(T)) is the type strain.
