= Stenotrophomonas humi =

Scientific classification
- Domain: Bacteria
- Kingdom: Pseudomonadati
- Phylum: Pseudomonadota
- Class: Gammaproteobacteria
- Order: Lysobacterales
- Family: Lysobacteraceae
- Genus: Stenotrophomonas
- Species: S. humi

Binomial name
- Stenotrophomonas humi Heylen et al. 2007

Type strain
- DSM 18929, LMG 23959, strain R-32729

Species of bacterium

Stenotrophomonas humi is a nitrate-reducing, Gram-negative, rod-shaped and non-spore-forming bacterium from the genus Stenotrophomonas which has been isolated from soil from Ghent in Belgium.
