= Xanthomonas fragariae =

Scientific classification
- Domain: Bacteria
- Kingdom: Pseudomonadati
- Phylum: Pseudomonadota
- Class: Gammaproteobacteria
- Order: Lysobacterales
- Family: Lysobacteraceae
- Genus: Xanthomonas
- Species: X. fragariae

Binomial name
- Xanthomonas fragariae Kennedy and King 1962

Type strain
- NCPPB 1469

Species of bacterium

Xanthomonas fragariae is a species of bacteria. It causes a leaf spot disease found in strawberries (Fragaria spp.). The type strain is NCPPB1469 from Fragaria chiloensis var. ananassa.

== Environment ==
Favorable environmental factors for Xanthomonas fragariae are not fully understood and need to be studied more. It has been noticed, however, that X. fragariae thrive in humid climates. Xanthomonas fragariae are also most prevalent in climates with cool to moderate temperatures.

== Host & symptoms ==
Infection caused by the angular leaf spot pathogen first appears as water-soaked lesions found on the lower surface of strawberry leaves. These water-soaked lesions are the result of bacterial colonization within the plant leaf tissue. Lesions typically get larger as the infection worsens, and the enlarged lesions then form translucent spots. These angular spots typically exude an ooze of bacteria that appears as a white and flakey film once dry.^{[2]} Lesions on the upper surface of leaves will also become visible with time. As the disease worsens, the angular spots grow larger and begin to combine. Severely affected leaves can tear away and become jagged, with a dry and reddish-brown appearance. Prolonged wetness on strawberry leaves can exacerbate this disease, so air circulation and sunlight exposure are important to protecting the host plants. These symptoms are similar to leaf scorch and common leaf spot so be careful when examining symptoms of diseased plants.^{[3]} Dark purple spots scattered on the leaf surface are symptoms of leaf scorch and common leaf spot, but not angular leaf spot.

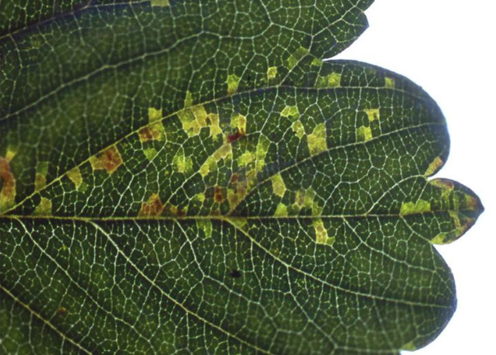
Easily visible translucent spots when held up to light. This is indicative of angular leaf spot on a strawberry leaf.

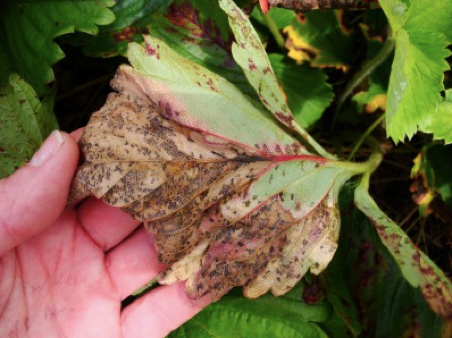
Significant disease on the underside of a strawberry leaf.

== Importance ==
X. fragariae was first reported on strawberries in 1960 in Minnesota. It is now found throughout many American states, Europe, South America, Africa, Australia, and New Zealand. X. fragariae does not have a large host range, it infects different strawberry varieties, including Fragaria virginiana and F. vesca, along with Potentilla fruticosa, and P. glandulosa. Even though X. fragariae has a small host range, it is capable of causing major damage. Angular Leaf Spot, caused by X. fragariae, can cause up to 75% yield reduction of strawberries. Angular Leaf Spot is currently an issue in strawberry nursery production, leading to problems in transporting strawberry plants throughout the U.S and over to Europe. Xanthomonas fragariae is not only an issue transporting young plants, but infected fruits can lead to a symptom known as “black cap” that can reduce the quality and marketability of the fruit.

== Diagnosis ==
Place suspected diseased leaves up against a bright light to see the translucent spots associated with Xanthomonas fragariae.^{[4]} By looking from the backside of infected leaves, light should pass through the angular shaped lesions and appear as lighter colored patches.

== Pathogenesis ==
X. fragariae is a gram-negative bacterium, that is rod shaped ranging from 0.4-1.0 μm wide and 0.7-2.0 μm long (Louws). The primary host of X. fragariae are strawberry plants (F. virginiana and F. vesca). X. fragariae are classified as an A2 level quarantine pathogen by the European Plant Protection Organization, meaning that this bacteria can be spread easily through the movement of strawberry plants. X. fragariae will attack both the stock and the fruit of strawberries plants. X. fragariae is often spread by infected transplants or systemically infected overwintered plants and dead leaves. It can also be spread plant to plant through water droplets from rain or irrigation. Once X. fragariae lands on a new host, it will enter into the strawberry plant through its open stomata. X. fragariae produces many toxins that are key factors in pathogenesis, including hemolytic and cytolytic RTX-toxins. X. fragariae also uses a T3SS to secrete T3E genes: xopN, xopR, xopV to suppress the innate immune response in strawberries.

== Disease cycle ==
The primary source of inoculum is previously infected debris and necrotic plant tissue, as the pathogen itself cannot freely survive in the soil.^{[5]} Strawberry plants that suffer from systemic infection unfortunately have the bacteria in their vascular system. In spring, after the crowns of infected live plants overwinter, the vascularized bacteria become active and begin inducing symptoms. Bacteria oozes out of the leaf lesions, causing the disease to spread when rain splashes the bacteria onto other susceptible plants and enters through natural openings or wounds. ^{[6]}

== Management ==
Chemical controls are ineffective against this disease, and the use of copper containing compounds can cause phytotoxicity in the plants. It is best to destroy infected leaves, plants, and debris immediately by burning or burying it. Cultural controls can include choosing a growing site with adequate air circulation, low humidity, and moderate daytime temperatures to promote the drying of plant leaves. Also try to limit the surrounding weeds so that air circulation is not compromised, and use overhead irrigation if available. Avoid harvesting or moving equipment when fields are wet to limit wounding on susceptible plants. Although there are no completely resistant cultivars, using less susceptible cultivars can be a helpful preventative measure. Allstar, Annapolis, Cavendish, Honeoye, and Kent are the least resistant to the disease and should be planted with high caution. Relatively recent studies by Turecheck et al. have shown heat treatments to be successful in dealing with angular leaf spot. They found that the number of living Xanthomonas fragariae were reduced by a minimum of 10^{5}-10^{6} CFU/ml after exposing infected plants to heat treatments of 44-48^{o} C for 2–4 hours. At temperatures this high, this bacterial pathogen can be killed on infected plants. It is still unclear how these treatments would be conducted on commercial scales however, so other modes of control are being investigated.
