= Arenimonas soli =

Scientific classification
- Domain: Bacteria
- Kingdom: Pseudomonadati
- Phylum: Pseudomonadota
- Class: Gammaproteobacteria
- Order: Lysobacterales
- Family: Lysobacteraceae
- Genus: Arenimonas
- Species: A. soli

Binomial name
- Arenimonas soli Xu et al. 2017

Type strain
- CGMCC 1.15905, KCTC 52420, strain Y3L17

Species of bacterium

Arenimonas soli is a Gram-negative, aerobic and non-motile bacterium from the genus of Arenimonas which has been isolated from saline-alkaline soil from Hanggin Banner from the Inner Mongolia.
