= Xanthomonas codiaei =

Scientific classification
- Domain: Bacteria
- Kingdom: Pseudomonadati
- Phylum: Pseudomonadota
- Class: Gammaproteobacteria
- Order: Lysobacterales
- Family: Lysobacteraceae
- Genus: Xanthomonas
- Species: X. codiaei

Binomial name
- Xanthomonas codiaei Vauterin et al. 1995

Species of bacterium

Xanthomonas codiaei is a species of gram-negative bacteria from the order Lysobacterales.
