= Luteimonas marina =

Scientific classification
- Domain: Bacteria
- Kingdom: Pseudomonadati
- Phylum: Pseudomonadota
- Class: Gammaproteobacteria
- Order: Lysobacterales
- Family: Lysobacteraceae
- Genus: Luteimonas
- Species: L. marina

Binomial name
- Luteimonas marina Baik et al. 2008

Species of bacterium

Luteimonas marina is a species of gram-negative bacterium. Its type strain is FR1330(T) (=KCTC 12327(T) =JCM 12488(T) =IMSNU 60306(T)).
