= Pseudoxanthomonas japonensis =

Scientific classification
- Domain: Bacteria
- Kingdom: Pseudomonadati
- Phylum: Pseudomonadota
- Class: Gammaproteobacteria
- Order: Lysobacterales
- Family: Lysobacteraceae
- Genus: Pseudoxanthomonas
- Species: P. japonensis

Binomial name
- Pseudoxanthomonas japonensis Thierry et al. 2004

Species of bacterium

Pseudoxanthomonas japonensis is a species of mesophilic, motile, strictly aerobic, Gram-negative, non-spore-forming, rod-shaped bacteria with one polar flagellum, first isolated from human urine, riverside urban soil and anaerobic digester. 12-3^{T} (=CCUG 48231^{T} =CIP 107388^{T} =JCM 11525^{T}) is the type strain.
