= Arenimonas daechungensis =

Scientific classification
- Domain: Bacteria
- Kingdom: Pseudomonadati
- Phylum: Pseudomonadota
- Class: Gammaproteobacteria
- Order: Lysobacterales
- Family: Lysobacteraceae
- Genus: Arenimonas
- Species: A. daechungensis

Binomial name
- Arenimonas daechungensis Huy et al. 2013

Type strain
- CH15-1, DSM 24763, KCTC 23553

Species of bacterium

Arenimonas daechungensis is a Gram-negative, non-spore-forming, rod-shaped and non-motile bacterium from the genus of Arenimonas which has been isolated from sediments from the Daechung reservoir in Korea.
