= Arenimonas caeni =

Scientific classification
- Domain: Bacteria
- Kingdom: Pseudomonadati
- Phylum: Pseudomonadota
- Class: Gammaproteobacteria
- Order: Lysobacterales
- Family: Lysobacteraceae
- Genus: Arenimonas
- Species: A. caeni

Binomial name
- Arenimonas caeni Liu et al. 2018

Type strain
- CCTCC AB 2017067, JCM 32091, strain z29

Species of bacterium

Arenimonas caeni is a Gram-negative, rod-shaped, non-spore-forming and motile bacterium from the genus of Arenimonas which has been isolated from activated sludge from Wuhu in China.
