= ETX0462 =

Identifiers
- IUPAC name: [(1R,7S)-7-(N-hydroxy-N'-methylcarbamimidoyl)-5-methyl-9-oxo-4,5,8,10-tetrazatricyclo[6.2.1.0^{2,6}]undeca-2(6),3-dien-10-yl] hydrogen sulfate
- PubChem CID: 135376294
- ChemSpider: 131615996

Chemical and physical data
- Formula: C_{10}H_{14}N_{6}O_{6}S
- Molar mass: 346.32 g·mol^{−1}
- 3D model (JSmol): Interactive image
- SMILES: CN=C([C@@H]1C2=C(C=NN2C)[C@@H]3CN1C(=O)N3OS(=O)(=O)O)NO
- InChI: InChI=1S/C10H14N6O6S/c1-11-9(13-18)8-7-5(3-12-14(7)2)6-4-15(8)10(17)16(6)22-23(19,20)21/h3,6,8,18H,4H2,1-2H3,(H,11,13)(H,19,20,21)/t6-,8-/m0/s1; Key:HXTQIYBHDSBEJG-XPUUQOCRSA-N

ETX0462 is an experimental antibiotic drug which acts both as a β-lactamase inhibitor and also has separate antibiotic activity in its own right. It is active against a range of drug-resistant bacteria of concern including Pseudomonas aeruginosa, Stenotrophomonas maltophilia, and Burkholderia cepacia. While ETX0462 is still in pre-clinical research and has not yet reached clinical trials, it was hailed as a significant advance as it represents an example of a completely new structural class of antibiotics, so even if this particular molecule does not get developed for medical use it is likely that related compounds will continue to be developed.

== See also ==
- Avibactam
- Durlobactam
- Diazabicyclooctane β-lactamase inhibitor
