= Stenotrophomonas bentonitica =

Scientific classification
- Domain: Bacteria
- Kingdom: Pseudomonadati
- Phylum: Pseudomonadota
- Class: Gammaproteobacteria
- Order: Lysobacterales
- Family: Lysobacteraceae
- Genus: Stenotrophomonas
- Species: S. bentonitica

Binomial name
- Stenotrophomonas bentonitica Sanchez-Castro et al. 2017

Type strain
- CECT 9180, DSM 103927, LMG 29893, strain BII-R7

Species of bacterium

Stenotrophomonas bentonitica is a gram-negative, rod-shaped and aerobic bacterium from the genus Stenotrophomonas which has been isolated from soil from Almeria in Spain.
