= Arenimonas oryziterrae =

Scientific classification
- Domain: Bacteria
- Kingdom: Pseudomonadati
- Phylum: Pseudomonadota
- Class: Gammaproteobacteria
- Order: Lysobacterales
- Family: Lysobacteraceae
- Genus: Arenimonas
- Species: A. oryziterrae

Binomial name
- Arenimonas oryziterrae Aslam et al. 2009

Type strain
- DSM 21050, KCTC 22247, YC6267

Species of bacterium

Arenimonas oryziterrae is a Gram-negative, aerobic and rod-shaped bacterium from the genus of Arenimonas which has been isolated from rhizosphere soil from a rice plant (Oryza sativa) from Jinju in Korea.
