= Luteimonas aquatica =

Scientific classification
- Domain: Bacteria
- Kingdom: Pseudomonadati
- Phylum: Pseudomonadota
- Class: Gammaproteobacteria
- Order: Lysobacterales
- Family: Lysobacteraceae
- Genus: Luteimonas
- Species: L. aquatica

Binomial name
- Luteimonas aquatica Chou et al. 2008

Species of bacterium

Luteimonas aquatica is a species of yellow-pigmented bacteria. It is Gram-negative, rod-shaped and non-spore-forming, with type strain RIB1-20(T) (=BCRC 17731(T) =LMG 24212(T)).
