= Stenotrophomonas daejeonensis =

Scientific classification
- Domain: Bacteria
- Kingdom: Pseudomonadati
- Phylum: Pseudomonadota
- Class: Gammaproteobacteria
- Order: Lysobacterales
- Family: Lysobacteraceae
- Genus: Stenotrophomonas
- Species: S. daejeonensis

Binomial name
- Stenotrophomonas daejeonensis Lee et al. 2011

Type strain
- JCM 16244, KCTC 22451, strain MJ03

Species of bacterium

Stenotrophomonas daejeonensis is an aerobic, Gram-negative and motile bacterium from the genus Stenotrophomonas which has been isolated from sewage.
