= Xanthomonas populi =

Scientific classification
- Domain: Bacteria
- Kingdom: Pseudomonadati
- Phylum: Pseudomonadota
- Class: Gammaproteobacteria
- Order: Lysobacterales
- Family: Lysobacteraceae
- Genus: Xanthomonas
- Species: X. populi

Binomial name
- Xanthomonas populi (Ridé 1958) van den Mooter and Swings 1990

Species of bacterium

Xanthomonas populi is a species of gram-negative bacteria.
