= Stenotrophomonas acidaminiphila =

Scientific classification
- Domain: Bacteria
- Kingdom: Pseudomonadati
- Phylum: Pseudomonadota
- Class: Gammaproteobacteria
- Order: Lysobacterales
- Family: Lysobacteraceae
- Genus: Stenotrophomonas
- Species: S. acidaminiphila

Binomial name
- Stenotrophomonas acidaminiphila Assih et al. 2002

Type strain
- ATCC 700916, CCUG 46887, CIP 106456, DSM 13117, strain AMX 19

Synonyms
- Stenotrophomonas acidaminophila

Species of bacterium

Stenotrophomonas acidaminiphila is a strictly aerobic, gram-negative, mesophilic, non-spore-forming and motile bacterium from the genus Stenotrophomonas which has been isolated from industrial waste water in Mexico. Stenotrophomonas acidaminiphila can degrade polycyclic aromatic hydrocarbons.
