= Esculentin-2CHa =

Name	Esculentin-2CHa
Length	37
Mass	3841.1044
Isoelectric point (pI)	10.44
Net charge	+5
Hydrophobicity	+30.36 Kcal * mol^{−1}
Extinction coefficient 1(*)	125 M^{−1} * cm^{−1}
Extinction coefficient 2 (*)	0 M^{−1} * cm^{−1}
Sequence	GFSSIFRGVAKFASKGLGKDLAKLGVDLVACKISKQC

Esculentin-2CHa (from Latin ēsculentus (“edible; nutritious; full of food”)) is an antimicrobial peptide located outside the epithelial cell's membrane of the skin of many species of amphibians, such as Rana chiricahuensis. This peptide has recently become more important due to its defense response function and its possible application in the treatment of various human pathologies, that range from type 2 diabetes to bacterial and fungi infections. Esculentin-2CHa is a peptide that belongs to the Esculentin-2 family, which is known for its broad-spectrum of antimicrobial activity and its low cytotoxicity to human erythrocytes. However, not much is known about its structures and their relation to the functions these peptides carry out.

(*) The molar extinction is calculated by the number of tyrosines (Y), and the number of disulfide bonding pairs (cystines). Then the following formula is used to calculate the first extinction coefficient: W*5500 + Y*1490 + cystines*125. This calculation assumes that all cysteines pair into cystines. The second version assumes that all cysteines are reduced and there are no cystines, thus it is calculated as W*5500 + Y*1490.

== Origin ==
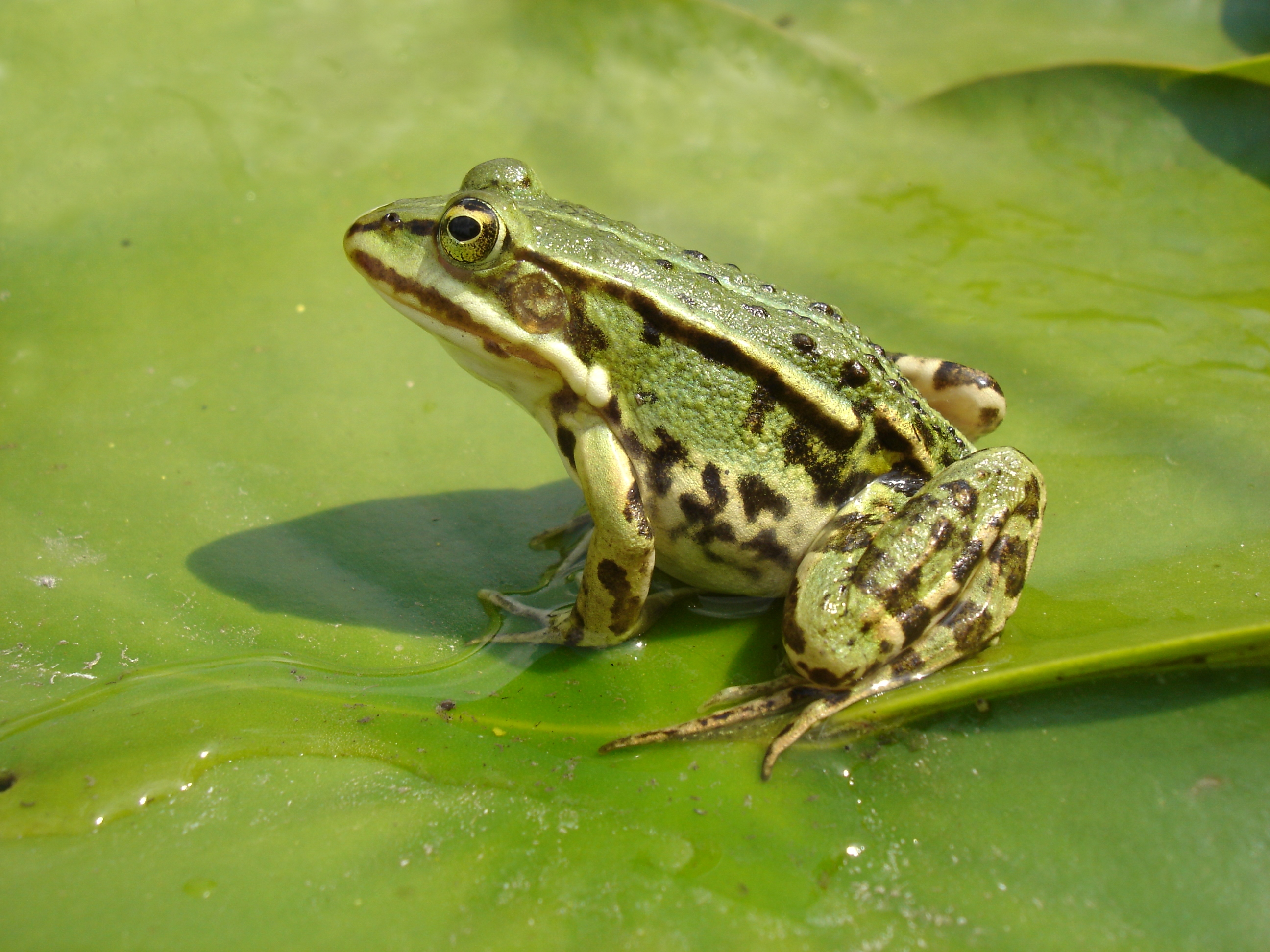
Esculentin-2CHa was first removed from Rana Esculenta skin

Esculentin-2CHa is a cytotoxic peptide with potent antibacterial and antifungal activity that can be found in the skin secretions from many species of Anura (frogs and toads). These kind of secretions include a wide variety of components of great importance due to their applications at anti-infective and anti-cancer drugs development.

Frogs from family Ranidae, also known as "the true frogs", are one of the richest sources of esculentin-2CHa and hundreds of other antimicrobial peptides. The 347 currently recognised species that compose the family Ranidae are widely distributed around the world. Esculentin-2 was removed for the first time from the skin of the frog Rana esculenta, native to Eurasia. Peptides with similar structure have also been identified in other Eurasian and North American species.

Esculentin-2CHa was particularly found at the secretions of the Chiricahua leopard frog Lithobates chiricahuensis, endemic to Mexico, Arizona and New Mexico (USA).

== Structure ==
=== Primary structure ===
Esculentin-2CHa is constituted by thirty-seven amino acids. These amino acids have different characteristics; some are aliphatic and hydrophobic like Alanine and Leucine. Others, for example Phenylalanine, are aromatic and hydrophobic; therefore, they repel water. There are also positively charged amino acids (Arginine and Lysine) and a negatively charged one (Aspartic acid). The rest are polar compounds with no charge (Serine, Cysteine and Glutamine).

=== Secondary structure ===
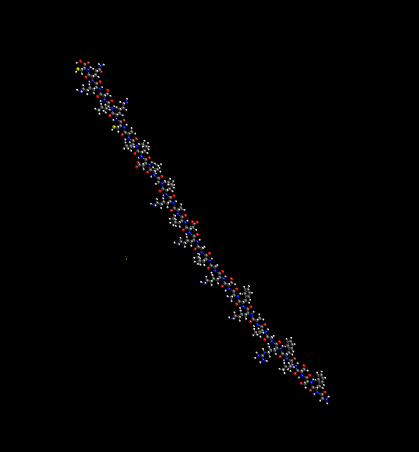
Peptid esculentin-2CHa tertiary structure

Esculentin's secondary structure follows an alpha-helical model, specifically in the central to the C-terminal region (residues 17-33) of the peptide. This conformation is the one that has the most probability based on the helix/coli transition theory. There are different modifications of the peptide that have been studied, for instance, the deletion or replacement of Cys31 and Cys37 of the cyclic domain at the C-terminus region by the isosteric l-serine . This change causes a decrease of the helicity of the analog.

On the other hand, there are some fragments that maintain the extended-helical conformation and others that don't, when domains from the N-terminus of the peptide are removed. Though these analogs preserve the hydrophobicity and cationicity characteristic of esculentin-2CHa.

Other analogs that were studied had a helical form shorter than the original peptide and a higher charge at pH=7 (+9), when Asp20 and Asp27 residues were replaced by l-lysine.

=== Tertiary structure ===
Due to the recent discovery of this peptide, there's not enough information about its third and fourth structure.

== Function ==
The principal functions, and the ones esculentin-2CHa is very remarkable for are:

- Antibacterial and antifungal activity
- Permeabilization of mammalian cells by interacting with the cell's membrane in a non-specific way
- Toxicity against non-small cell lung adenocarcinoma A549 cells
- Decrease of glucagon and plasma GLP-1

Esculentin-2CHa shows a potent growth-inhibitory activity against some of the reference strains of Gram-negative bacteria, such as Escherichia Coli, and multi-drug resistant strains of Acinetobacter baumannii, Stenotrophomonas maltophilia and Staphylococcus aureus. That is why this peptide is a candidate for anti-infective drug development.

In addition to that, it has been demonstrated that thanks to esculentin-2CHa mouse lymphoid cells stimulate the production of interleukin-10. Interleukin-10 is an anti-inflammatory cytokine that contributes to the homeostatic maintenance of the organism by controlling the host immune response to pathogens. Even though esculentin-2CHa exhibits high cytotoxicity against human non-small lung adenocarcinoma A549 cells, it presents a low profile of toxicity towards human erythrocytes.

== Biological applications ==
Some emerging strains of pathogenic bacteria develop a resistance to antibiotics that are commonly used. Similarly, tumors can become unresponsive to chemotherapy. This resistance to multidrug treatments raised interest in finding new drugs that were capable of fighting these bacteria and tumors in a way that does not harm significantly the well functioning human cells.

That is why esculentin-2CHa, as a peptide with antibacterial and anticancer activity, and a low profile of toxicity against human erythrocytes, is a candidate for anti-infective drug development.

A use of this peptide has also been linked to the treatment of type 2 diabetes.

=== Esculentin-2CHa for type 2 Diabetes Mellitus ===
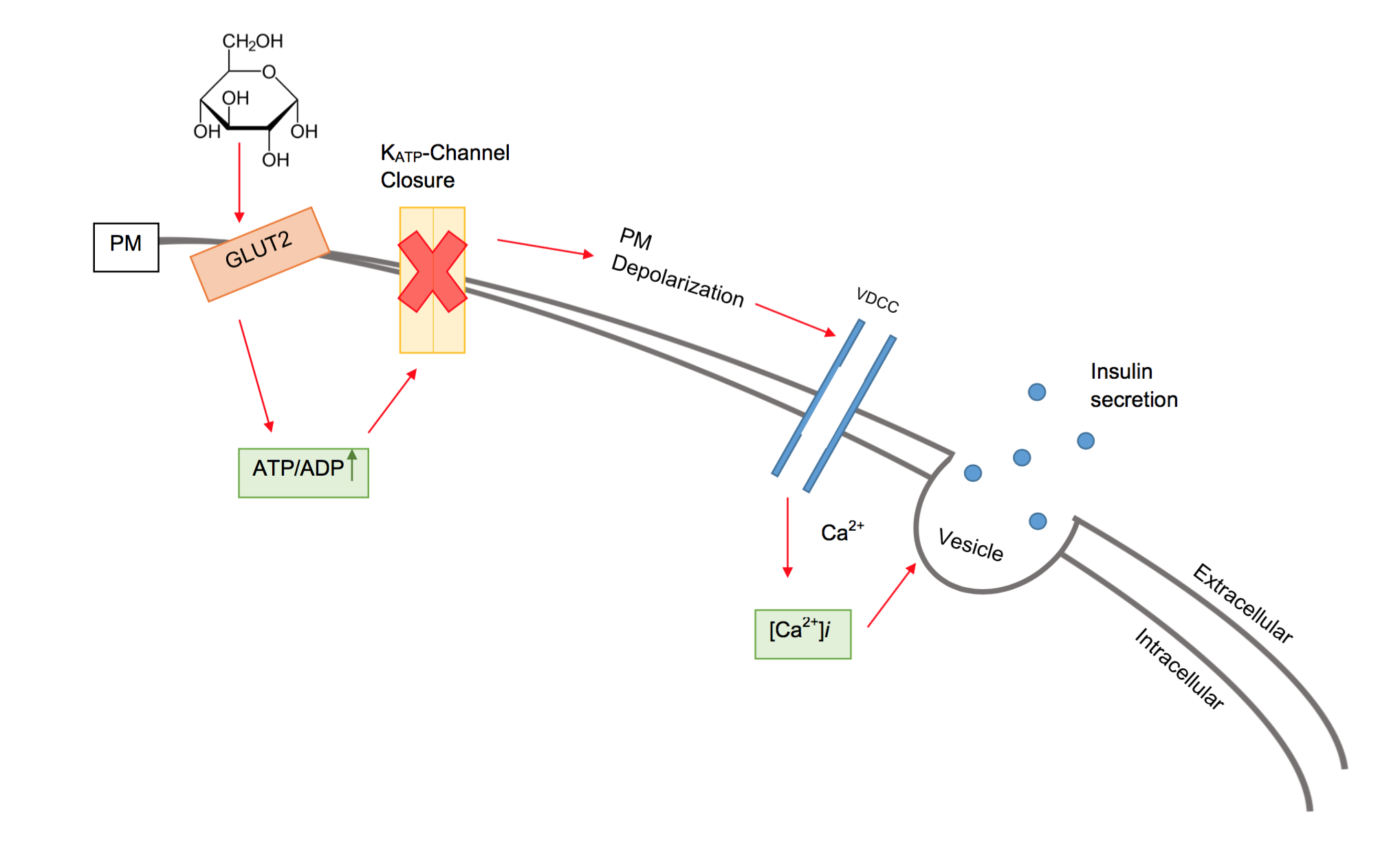
Esculentin-2CHa estimulates the insulin secretion process in beta cells (pancreas)

It has been shown that esculentin-2CHa administration in NIH Swiss mice following a high-fat diet reduced their body weight and blood glucose levels as well as insulin sensitivity by decreasing the glucagon and the plasma GLP-1, parameters that were increased due to the high fat diet. These studies lead to the hypothesis that esculentin-2-CHa could be a very interesting drug to treat type 2 diabetes mellitus.

The treatment with this peptide did not show negative effects such as alteration of the bone mineral density or a liver dysfunction, which would have indicated toxicity.

Furthermore, Esculentin-2CHa helps to promote beta cell proliferation and their survival. This fact is very important because such type of cells, which can be found in the pancreas, are responsible for the storage and release of the insulin hormone.

It has been reported that esculentin-2CHa commands direct stimulatory actions on beta cells, implying peptide incorporation, K_{ATP}-independent membrane depolarization and incrementation of intracellular Ca^{+2}, that ends up in the insulin hormone exocytosis. Therefore, esculentin-2CHa promotes the secretion of insulin to the blood, helping to reduce the glucose concentration in this tissue.
