= Xanthomonas cynarae =

Scientific classification
- Domain: Bacteria
- Kingdom: Pseudomonadati
- Phylum: Pseudomonadota
- Class: Gammaproteobacteria
- Order: Lysobacterales
- Family: Lysobacteraceae
- Genus: Xanthomonas
- Species: X. cynarae

Binomial name
- Xanthomonas cynarae Trébaol et al. 2000,

Species of bacterium

Xanthomonas cynarae is a species of bacteria. Having subsumed X. gardneri (bacterial leaf spot of peppers and tomatoes) on the basis of insufficient genetic difference in 2019, X. cynarae was itself subsumed by X. hortorum in 2020 for the same reason.
