= Arenimonas aestuarii =

Scientific classification
- Domain: Bacteria
- Kingdom: Pseudomonadati
- Phylum: Pseudomonadota
- Class: Gammaproteobacteria
- Order: Lysobacterales
- Family: Lysobacteraceae
- Genus: Arenimonas
- Species: A. aestuarii

Binomial name
- Arenimonas aestuarii Jeong et al. 2016

Type strain
- JCM 31129, KACC 18504, strain S2-21

Species of bacterium

Arenimonas aestuarii is a Gram-negative, aerobic and non-motile bacterium from the genus of Arenimonas which has been isolated from estuary sediments from Asan in Korea.
