= Pseudoxanthomonas mexicana =

Scientific classification
- Domain: Bacteria
- Kingdom: Pseudomonadati
- Phylum: Pseudomonadota
- Class: Gammaproteobacteria
- Order: Lysobacterales
- Family: Lysobacteraceae
- Genus: Pseudoxanthomonas
- Species: P. mexicana

Binomial name
- Pseudoxanthomonas mexicana Thierry et al. 2004

Species of bacterium

Pseudoxanthomonas mexicana is a species of mesophilic, motile, strictly aerobic, Gram-negative, non-spore-forming, rod-shaped bacteria with one polar flagellum, first isolated from human urine, riverside urban soil and anaerobic digester. AMX 26B^{T} (=ATCC 700993^{T} =CIP 106674^{T} =JCM 11524^{T}) is the type strain.

Several isolates of Pseudoxanthomonas have been isolated from various wastewater environments across the world. The S254 strain isolated from soil contaminated with wastewater was identified as P. mexicana and was found to be capable of producing hydrogen cyanide and auxin. The strain is a plant growth promoter, exhibiting growth promotion both in the presence and absence of arsenic, increasing shoot and root lengths. P. mexicana WO24 strain, isolated from wastewater sediment in Mexico, encodes the protease enzyme dipeptidyl aminopeptidase BII, which was found to clip dipeptides from the N-terminus of substrate peptides. The P. mexicana strain CH isolated from the sludge of wastewater treatment plants is capable of degrading nonylphenol, a persistent toxic substance, and exhibiting chemotaxis as a result. P. mexicana GTZY isolated from an aerobic-biofilm wastewater system facilitates detoxification of heavy metals like mercury and arsenic, suggesting its potential for bioremediation of polluted environments. A new Class 1integron, ln-Tn5393c, was identified in P. mexicana, potentially explaining its resistance to multiple antibiotics.

In Mexico, Mexico City, this bacterium was isolated from an anaerobic digester and introduced as a transient microorganism through wastewater. Additionally, Pseudoxanthomonas mexicana is a good bacterium to study due to its ability to degrade harmful pollutants through bioremediation. Moreover, recent evidence suggests that this bacterium is the source of an enzyme with a recent origin that is highly resistant to carbapenem antibiotics.
