= Luteimonas vadosa =

Scientific classification
- Domain: Bacteria
- Kingdom: Pseudomonadati
- Phylum: Pseudomonadota
- Class: Gammaproteobacteria
- Order: Lysobacterales
- Family: Lysobacteraceae
- Genus: Luteimonas
- Species: L. vadosa

Binomial name
- Luteimonas vadosa Romanenko et al. 2013

Species of bacterium

Luteimonas vadosa is aerobic, Gram-negative, yellow-pigmented, nonmotile, rod-shaped bacterium. Its type strain is KMM 9005(T) ( = NRIC 0881(T) = JCM 18392(T)).
