= Xanthomonas phaseoli =

Scientific classification
- Domain: Bacteria
- Kingdom: Pseudomonadati
- Phylum: Pseudomonadota
- Class: Gammaproteobacteria
- Order: Lysobacterales
- Family: Lysobacteraceae
- Genus: Xanthomonas
- Species: X. phaseoli

Binomial name
- Xanthomonas phaseoli (Smith 1897) Gabriel et al. 1989

Species of bacterium

Xanthomonas phaseoli, sometimes referred to as bean blight, is a species of bacteria.
