= Xanthomonas sacchari =

Scientific classification
- Domain: Bacteria
- Kingdom: Pseudomonadati
- Phylum: Pseudomonadota
- Class: Gammaproteobacteria
- Order: Lysobacterales
- Family: Lysobacteraceae
- Genus: Xanthomonas
- Species: X. sacchari

Binomial name
- Xanthomonas sacchari Vauterin et al. 1995

Species of bacterium

Xanthomonas sacchari is a species of bacteria.
