= Luteimonas lutimaris =

Scientific classification
- Domain: Bacteria
- Kingdom: Pseudomonadati
- Phylum: Pseudomonadota
- Class: Gammaproteobacteria
- Order: Lysobacterales
- Family: Lysobacteraceae
- Genus: Luteimonas
- Species: L. lutimaris

Binomial name
- Luteimonas lutimaris Park et al. 2011

Species of bacterium

Luteimonas lutimaris is yellow-pigmented, Gram-negative, strictly aerobic bacterium. Its type strain is G3(T) (= KACC 14929(T) = JCM 16916(T)).
