= Luteimonas composti =

Scientific classification
- Domain: Bacteria
- Kingdom: Pseudomonadati
- Phylum: Pseudomonadota
- Class: Gammaproteobacteria
- Order: Lysobacterales
- Family: Lysobacteraceae
- Genus: Luteimonas
- Species: L. composti

Binomial name
- Luteimonas composti Young et al. 2007

Species of bacterium

Luteimonas composti is a moderately thermophilic, yellow-pigmented bacterium. It is Gram-negative and rod-shaped, with type strain CC-YY255(T) (=CCUG 53595(T) =CIP 109311(T) =BCRC 17598(T)).
