= Arenimonas metalli =

Scientific classification
- Domain: Bacteria
- Kingdom: Pseudomonadati
- Phylum: Pseudomonadota
- Class: Gammaproteobacteria
- Order: Lysobacterales
- Family: Lysobacteraceae
- Genus: Arenimonas
- Species: A. metalli

Binomial name
- Arenimonas metalli Chen et al. 2012

Type strain
- CCTCC AB 2010449, CGMCC 1.10787, KCTC 23460, strain CF5-1

Species of bacterium

Arenimonas metalli is a Gram-negative, aerobic and rod-shaped bacterium from the genus of Arenimonas which has been isolated from the Hongshan Iron Mine from Daye in China.
