= Xanthomonas bromi =

Scientific classification
- Domain: Bacteria
- Kingdom: Pseudomonadati
- Phylum: Pseudomonadota
- Class: Gammaproteobacteria
- Order: Lysobacterales
- Family: Lysobacteraceae
- Genus: Xanthomonas
- Species: X. bromi

Binomial name
- Xanthomonas bromi Vauterin et al. 1995

Species of bacterium

Xanthomonas bromi is a species of bacteria. It infects Bromus grass species causing wilt.
