= Arenimonas maotaiensis =

Scientific classification
- Domain: Bacteria
- Kingdom: Pseudomonadati
- Phylum: Pseudomonadota
- Class: Gammaproteobacteria
- Order: Lysobacterales
- Family: Lysobacteraceae
- Genus: Arenimonas
- Species: A. maotaiensis

Binomial name
- Arenimonas maotaiensis Yuan et al. 2014

Type strain
- YT8, CGMCC 1.12726, JCM 19710

Synonyms
- Arenimonas chishuii

Species of bacterium

Arenimonas maotaiensis is a Gram-negative and facultatively anaerobic bacterium from the genus of Arenimonas which has been isolated from water from the Maotai section of the Chishui River in China.
