= Arenimonas taoyuanensis =

Scientific classification
- Domain: Bacteria
- Kingdom: Pseudomonadati
- Phylum: Pseudomonadota
- Class: Gammaproteobacteria
- Order: Lysobacterales
- Family: Lysobacteraceae
- Genus: Arenimonas
- Species: A. taoyuanensis

Binomial name
- Arenimonas taoyuanensis Zhang et al. 2016

Type strain
- CCTCC AB2012964, DSM 26777, strain YN2-31A

Species of bacterium

Arenimonas taoyuanensis is a Gram-negative, aerobic and rod-shaped bacterium from the genus of Arenimonas which has been isolated from soil from a rice field from Taoyuan Village in China.
