= Arenimonas composti =

Scientific classification
- Domain: Bacteria
- Kingdom: Pseudomonadati
- Phylum: Pseudomonadota
- Class: Gammaproteobacteria
- Order: Lysobacterales
- Family: Lysobacteraceae
- Genus: Arenimonas
- Species: A. composti

Binomial name
- Arenimonas composti (Jin et al. 2007) Aslam et al. 2009

Type strain
- CIP 109794, DSM 18010, KCTC 12666, TR7-09

Synonyms
- Aspromonas composti

Species of bacterium

Arenimonas composti is a Gram-negative, non-spore-forming and motile bacterium from the genus of Arenimonas which has been isolated from compost from Daejeon in Korea.
