= Stenotrophomonas indicatrix =

Scientific classification
- Domain: Bacteria
- Kingdom: Pseudomonadati
- Phylum: Pseudomonadota
- Class: Gammaproteobacteria
- Order: Lysobacterales
- Family: Lysobacteraceae
- Genus: Stenotrophomonas
- Species: S. indicatrix

Binomial name
- Stenotrophomonas indicatrix Weber et al. 2018

Type strain
- DSM 28278, LMG 29942, strain WS40

Species of bacterium

Stenotrophomonas indicatrix is a Gram-negative, rod-shaped and none-spore-forming bacterium from the genus Stenotrophomonas which has been isolated from the surface of a milking machine in Germany.
