= Xanthomonas arboricola pv. pruni =

Scientific classification
- Domain: Bacteria
- Kingdom: Pseudomonadati
- Phylum: Pseudomonadota
- Class: Gammaproteobacteria
- Order: Lysobacterales
- Family: Lysobacteraceae
- Genus: Xanthomonas
- Species: X. arboricola
- Pathovar: X. a. pv. pruni

Trionomial name
- Xanthomonas arboricola pv. pruni (Smith) Dye emend. Vauterin et al. 1995

Synonyms
- Homotypic: X. pruni (Smith) Dowson [nom. inval.]; X. arboricola pv. pruni (Smith) Dowson; Pseudomonas pruni Smith 1903

Bacterial disease of Prunus plants

Xanthomonas arboricola pv. pruni is a bacterial disease of almost all Prunus. The first complete genome was submitted to NCBI in 2019. Available genomes place it as a member inside Xanthomonas arboricola.

== Hosts ==
Almost all Prunus spp.

== Distribution ==
Unknown in stonefruit in California until detection in Sacramento and northern San Joaquin Valley in the spring of 2013. As of 2017 it is still restricted to those two areas. Also found in almond cultivation in Victoria, Australia.

== Detection ==
Palacio-Bielsa et al., 2011 provides a SYBR Green I-based assay.

== Management ==
Copper and mancozeb are recommended in California for almonds and have served well elsewhere. No pesticides are registered for almonds anywhere in Australia.

Phage therapy has been heavily studied for X. pruni and some treatments have been very successful. Civerolo & Keil performed several experiments in the 1970s with Xanthomonas pruni phage showing that peach and apricot were protected by external applications of solution.

=== Resistance ===
Resistance to copper has occurred. No copper resistance as of August 2017 in California. Rotation or tank mixing is recommended to forestall resistance.
