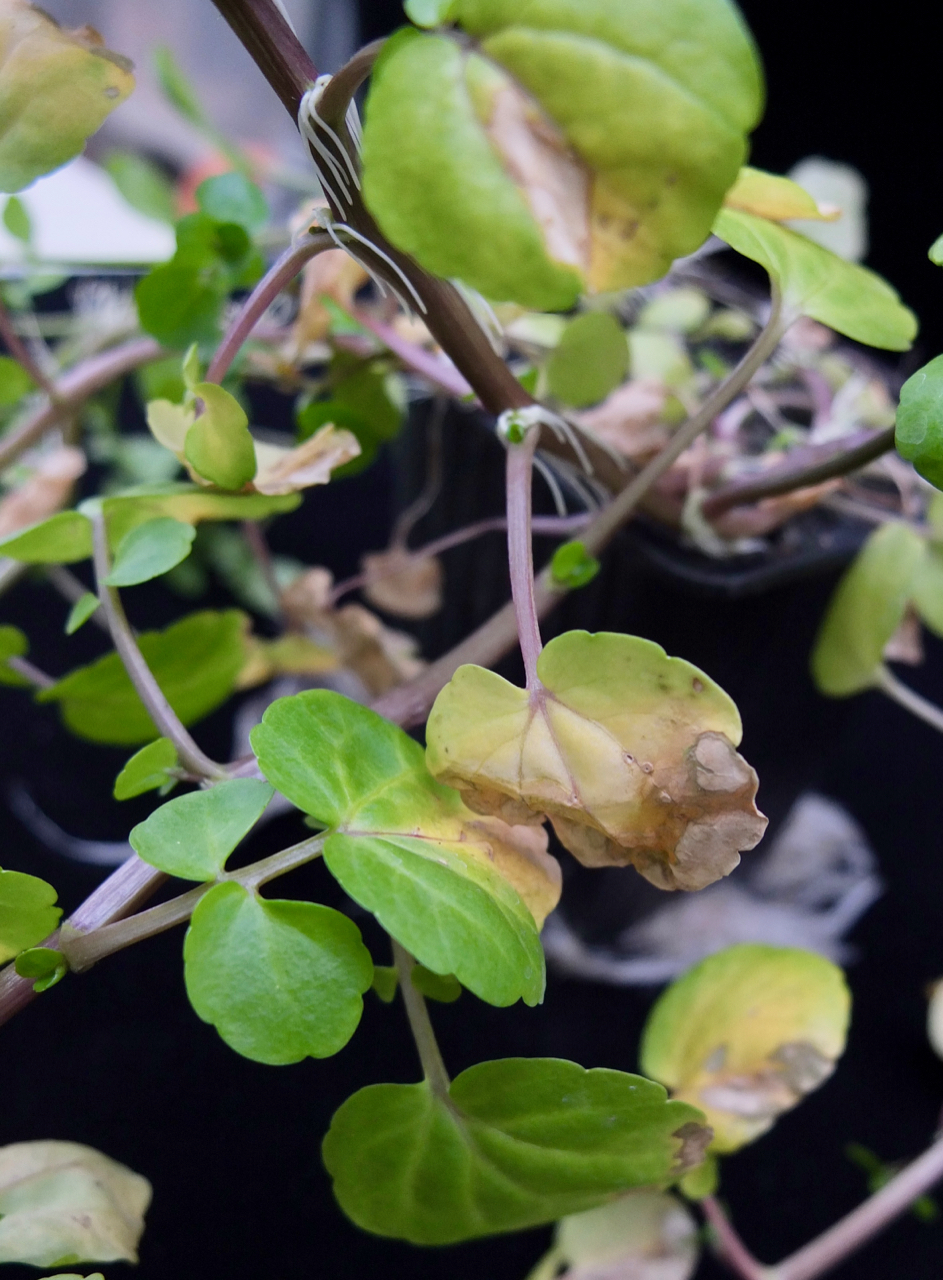
- Xanthomonas nasturii symptoms on watercress

Scientific classification
- Domain: Bacteria
- Kingdom: Pseudomonadati
- Phylum: Pseudomonadota
- Class: Gammaproteobacteria
- Order: Lysobacterales
- Family: Lysobacteraceae
- Genus: Xanthomonas
- Species: X. nasturtii

Binomial name
- Xanthomonas nasturtii Vincente, 2017

= Xanthomonas nasturtii =

Species of bacteria

Xanthomonas nasturii a gram-negative, obligate aerobic bacterium that like many other Xanthomonas spp. bacteria has been found associated with plants, in particular watercress (Nasturtium officinale). It causes black rot of watercress.

== Hosts and symptoms ==
Symptoms include small yellow or dark leaf lesions around the hydathodes, V -shaped leaf lesions, wilt, distortion of plants and early senescence. Initially the symptoms were attributed to Xanthomonas campestris due to the similarity of symptoms with black rot of brassicas.

== Distribution and economic importance ==
Watercress is a relatively small crop worldwide, but economically significant for some particular regions of the globe. Black rot of watercress can lower the quality of the watercress and possibly limit yields. It was reported that infections can lead to up to 60% yield reduction and rejection of crops.

The disease has been found in samples from the US, Florida and Hawaii. The disease has been regularly observed in Hawaii production in all islands, mostly during the rainy season from December to April in areas with poor air circulation.

This disease has also been found in Europe, in Spain and Portugal. It is likely that the disease can be seed transmitted as it has been detected in a seed sample from Spain.

== Control ==
Like for other bacterial diseases, control might involve the use of copper bactericides. It is advised to minimize moisture on leaves by reducing overhead irrigation and increasing air circulation.
