= Arenimonas daejeonensis =

Scientific classification
- Domain: Bacteria
- Kingdom: Pseudomonadati
- Phylum: Pseudomonadota
- Class: Gammaproteobacteria
- Order: Lysobacterales
- Family: Lysobacteraceae
- Genus: Arenimonas
- Species: A. daejeonensis

Binomial name
- Arenimonas daejeonensis Jin et al. 2012

Type strain
- DSM 18060, KCTC 12667, T7-07

Species of bacterium

Arenimonas daejeonensis is a Gram-negative, aerobic, rod-shaped and motile bacterium from the genus of Arenimonas which has been isolated from compost from Daejeon in Korea.
