= Arenimonas halophila =

Scientific classification
- Domain: Bacteria
- Kingdom: Pseudomonadati
- Phylum: Pseudomonadota
- Class: Gammaproteobacteria
- Order: Lysobacterales
- Family: Lysobacteraceae
- Genus: Arenimonas
- Species: A. halophila

Binomial name
- Arenimonas halophila Kanjanasuntree et al. 2018

Type strain
- KCTC 62235, NBRC 113093, strain CAU 1453

Species of bacterium

Arenimonas halophila is a Gram-negative, aerobic, rod-shaped and non-motile bacterium from the genus of Arenimonas which has been isolated from soil.
