= Xanthomonas alfalfae =

Scientific classification
- Domain: Bacteria
- Kingdom: Pseudomonadati
- Phylum: Pseudomonadota
- Class: Gammaproteobacteria
- Order: Lysobacterales
- Family: Lysobacteraceae
- Genus: Xanthomonas
- Species: X. alfalfae

Binomial name
- Xanthomonas alfalfae (Riker et al. 1935) Schaad et al. 2007

Type strain
- ATCC 11765

Synonyms
- Xanthomonas perforans Jones et al., 2006

Species of bacterium

Xanthomonas alfalfae is a species of bacteria.
