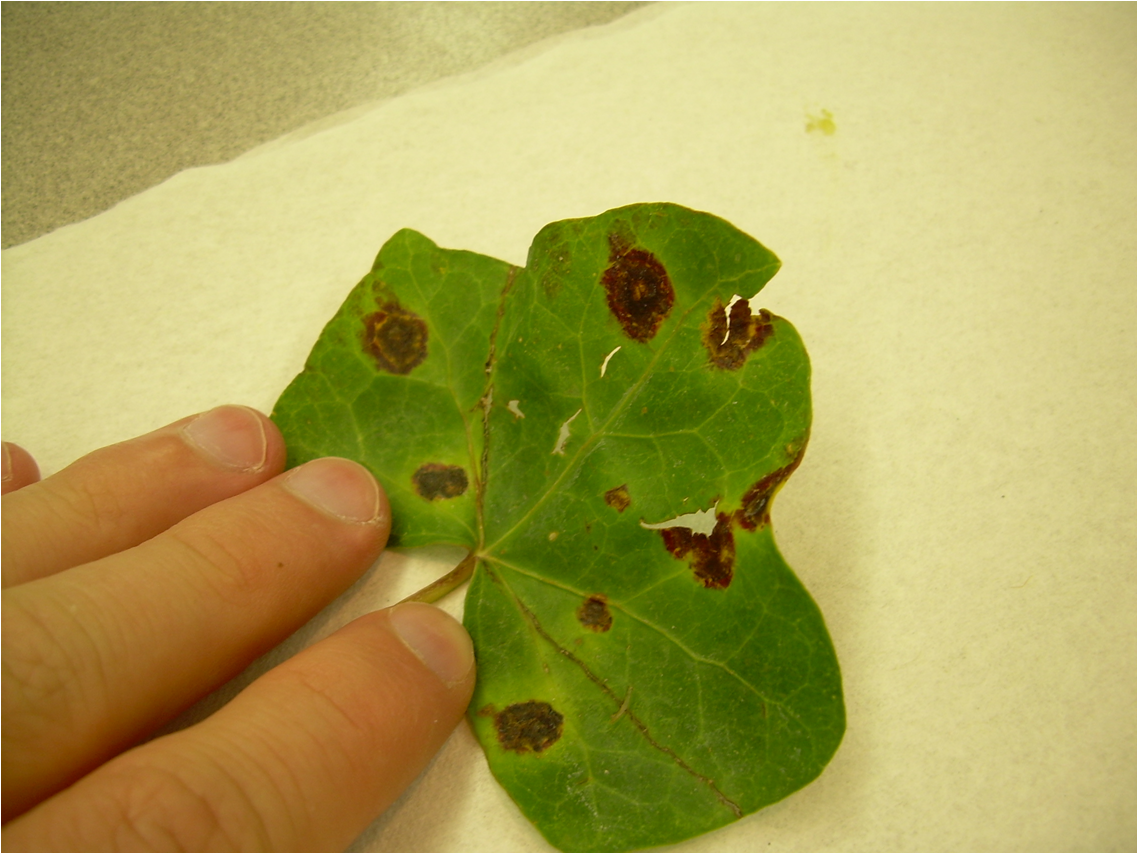
- Leaf spot on English ivy plant, caused by Xanthomonas hortorum

Scientific classification
- Domain: Bacteria
- Kingdom: Pseudomonadati
- Phylum: Pseudomonadota
- Class: Gammaproteobacteria
- Order: Lysobacterales
- Family: Lysobacteraceae
- Genus: Xanthomonas
- Species: X. hortorum

Binomial name
- Xanthomonas hortorum Vauterin et al. 1995

= Xanthomonas hortorum =

Species of bacterium

Xanthomonas hortorum is a plant pathogen. It includes the following pathovars;

- pv. hederae, common ivy and possibly other Araliaceae
- pv. taraxaci, Pelargonium peltatum
- pv. carotae, wild carrot
- pv. pelargonii, Kazakh dandelion
- pv. vitians, bacterial leafspot and headrot of lettuce, using the neopathotype of LMG 938
- pv. cynarae, formerly Xanthomonas cynarae, pathogenic on artichoke
- pv. gardneri, formerly Xanthomonas gardneri and briefly X. cynarae pv. gardneri, bacterial leafspot of peppers and tomatoes (pathotype also causes BLS on lettuce surprisingly)

The species was originally defined in 1995 as a grouping of pathovars hederae, taraxaci, carotae, pelargonii from Xanthomonas campestris, and the lettuce-infecting part of X. c. pv. vitians. (X. c. pv. vitians was found to consist of two genetic groups, only one of which causes disease on lettuce.)
