= Arenimonas malthae =

Scientific classification
- Domain: Bacteria
- Kingdom: Pseudomonadati
- Phylum: Pseudomonadota
- Class: Gammaproteobacteria
- Order: Lysobacterales
- Family: Lysobacteraceae
- Genus: Arenimonas
- Species: A. malthae

Binomial name
- Arenimonas malthae Young et al. 2007

Type strain
- CCUG 53596, CIP 109310, strain CC-JY-1

Species of bacterium

Arenimonas malthae is a Gram-negative and rod-shaped bacterium from the genus of Arenimonas which has been isolated from diesel-oil contaminated soil from Chiayi County in Taiwan.
