= Pseudoxanthomonas broegbernensis =

Scientific classification
- Domain: Bacteria
- Kingdom: Pseudomonadati
- Phylum: Pseudomonadota
- Class: Gammaproteobacteria
- Order: Lysobacterales
- Family: Lysobacteraceae
- Genus: Pseudoxanthomonas
- Species: P. broegbernensis

Binomial name
- Pseudoxanthomonas broegbernensis Finkmann et al. 2000

Species of bacterium

Pseudoxanthomonas broegbernensis is a yellow-pigmented bacteria the type species of its genus. Its type strain is B1616/1^{T} (= DSM 12573^{T}). Cells are gram-negative.
