= Arenimonas donghaensis =

Scientific classification
- Domain: Bacteria
- Kingdom: Pseudomonadati
- Phylum: Pseudomonadota
- Class: Gammaproteobacteria
- Order: Lysobacterales
- Family: Lysobacteraceae
- Genus: Arenimonas
- Species: A. donghaensis

Binomial name
- Arenimonas donghaensis Kwon et al. 2007

Type strain
- DSM 18148, HO3-R19, KACC 11381

Species of bacterium

Arenimonas donghaensis is a Gram-negative and aerobic bacterium from the genus of Arenimonas which has been isolated from sand from Pohang in Korea.
