= Xanthomonas euvesicatoria pv. perforans =

Scientific classification
- Domain: Bacteria
- Kingdom: Pseudomonadati
- Phylum: Pseudomonadota
- Class: Gammaproteobacteria
- Order: Lysobacterales
- Family: Lysobacteraceae
- Genus: Xanthomonas
- Species: X. euvesicatoria
- Pathovar: X. e. pv. perforans

Trionomial name
- Xanthomonas euvesicatoria pv. perforans (Jones et al.) Constantin et al. 2016

Synonyms
- Xanthomonas perforans Jones et al. 2006

Species of bacterium

Xanthomonas perforans is a species of bacteria. It is a parasite of plants including pepper and tomatoes, causing spots on infected leaves and fruit. X. perforans shows most growth at temperatures of 25-30C. It is widespread, but mostly found in North and South America.

It was shown to be insufficiently different from Xanthomonas euvesicatoria to be its own species in 2016. As a result it became Xanthomonas euvesicatoria pv. perforans. (Note: pathovars are not governed by the Prokaryotic Code, but the authors assigned one anyways because they find it useful to still be able to talk about this group of bacteria as a concrete entity.)
