= Stenotrophomonas nitritireducens =

Scientific classification
- Domain: Bacteria
- Kingdom: Pseudomonadati
- Phylum: Pseudomonadota
- Class: Gammaproteobacteria
- Order: Lysobacterales
- Family: Lysobacteraceae
- Genus: Stenotrophomonas
- Species: S. nitritireducens

Binomial name
- Stenotrophomonas nitritireducens Finkmann et al. 2000

Species of bacterium

Stenotrophomonas nitritireducens is a yellow-pigmented bacteria, named after its quality to reduce nitrite. It is a common soil bacteria. Its type strain is L2^{T} (= DSM 12575^{T}). Cells are gram-negative.

Stenotrophomonas nitritireducens has the ability to transform unsaturated fatty acids into hydroxy fatty acids. Hydroxy acids are incredibly important as they are the precursors of dicarboxylic acids and lactones and are one of the starting substances of polymers.
