= Luteimonas mephitis =

Scientific classification
- Domain: Bacteria
- Kingdom: Pseudomonadati
- Phylum: Pseudomonadota
- Class: Gammaproteobacteria
- Order: Lysobacterales
- Family: Lysobacteraceae
- Genus: Luteimonas
- Species: L. mephitis

Binomial name
- Luteimonas mephitis Finkmann et al. 2000

Species of bacterium

Luteimonas mephitis is a yellow-pigmented bacterium and the type species of its genus. Its type strain is B1953/27.1^{T} (= DSM 12574^{T}). Cells are gram-negative.
