= Stenotrophomonas pictorum =

Scientific classification
- Domain: Bacteria
- Kingdom: Pseudomonadati
- Phylum: Pseudomonadota
- Class: Gammaproteobacteria
- Order: Lysobacterales
- Family: Lysobacteraceae
- Genus: Stenotrophomonas
- Species: S. pictorum

Binomial name
- Stenotrophomonas pictorum (Gray and Thornton 1928) Ouattara et al. 2017

Type strain
- ATCC 23328, CCUG 1823, CCUG 3368, CIP 103273, JCM 9942

Synonyms
- Pseudomonas pictorum

Species of bacterium

Stenotrophomonas pictorum is a bacterium from the genus Stenotrophomonas which has been isolated from soil.
