= Arenimonas subflava =

Scientific classification
- Domain: Bacteria
- Kingdom: Pseudomonadati
- Phylum: Pseudomonadota
- Class: Gammaproteobacteria
- Order: Lysobacterales
- Family: Lysobacteraceae
- Genus: Arenimonas
- Species: A. subflava

Binomial name
- Arenimonas subflava Makk et al. 2015

Type strain
- DSM 25526, NCAIM B 02508, strain PYM3-14

Species of bacterium

Arenimonas subflava is a Gram-negative, aerobic and non-motile bacterium from the genus of Arenimonas which has been isolated from a drinking water network from Budapest in Hungary.
