= Arenimonas alkanexedens =

Scientific classification
- Domain: Bacteria
- Kingdom: Pseudomonadati
- Phylum: Pseudomonadota
- Class: Gammaproteobacteria
- Order: Lysobacterales
- Family: Lysobacteraceae
- Genus: Arenimonas
- Species: A. alkanexedens

Binomial name
- Arenimonas alkanexedens Zhu et al. 2017

Type strain
- LAM-WHM-D11

Species of bacterium

Arenimonas alkanexedens is a Gram-negative, facultatively anaerobic, rod-shaped and non-motile bacterium from the genus of Arenimonas which has been isolated from frozen soil from China.
