= Xanthomonas arboricola =

Scientific classification
- Domain: Bacteria
- Kingdom: Pseudomonadati
- Phylum: Pseudomonadota
- Class: Gammaproteobacteria
- Order: Lysobacterales
- Family: Lysobacteraceae
- Genus: Xanthomonas
- Species: X. arboricola

Binomial name
- Xanthomonas arboricola Vauterin et al. 1995

Type strain
- ATCC 49083

Species of bacterium

Xanthomonas arboricola is a species of bacteria. This phytopathogenic bacterium can cause disease in trees like Prunus, hazelnut and walnut.

== Hosts and symptoms ==
Xanthomonas arboricola has a vast host range, however, most symptoms are consistent throughout each of the cultivars such as hazelnut, walnut, and genus prunus (stone fruits). In X. pruni (syn. X. arboricola pv. pruni), the symptoms first usually begin with dark lesions forming on leaves. As the bacteria proliferate, bacterial ooze is noticeable as the necrotic lesions can become greasy. The discharge from the leaf can then spread inoculum to other leaves via rain splash. Infection can lead to an early defoliation of the plant, greatly affecting fruit production. Fruit will also show lesions similar to those found on the leaves. The lesions can cause significant rot of the fruit, thus decreasing or even eliminating any yield. While these are the primary symptoms, sometimes the bacteria can enter the twig over winter, and cause noticeable cankers in the spring; a dieback can happen if the stem cankers are severe enough.

== Disease cycle ==
Xanthomonas arboricola can infect all green tissue of the plant. The disease cycle of Xanthomonas arboricola begins on the leaves of the infected plant where the bacteria will live in an epiphytic stage (gathering all nutrients and water from the air) until mid to late spring when sufficient rainsplash spreads the bacteria to new buds and fruits where it becomes pathogenic. With enough early spring rain, a repeating cycle can form in which infected leaves and young buds pass the disease to early season fruit and nutlets. With less rain, a late season infection of fruit and nuts will occur. After the infection of fruit and nuts in autumn, Xanthomonas arboricola will spread to dormant buds and wounds in leaves or branches and overwinter. Come early spring the Xanthomonas will once again enter an epiphytic stage on leaves emerging from previously infected dormant buds and repeat the cycle annually.

== Environment impact on disease cycle ==
Incidence of infection can be correlated with rainfall events during the budding season of the walnut. The most important rains occurring during bud break events. This is due to the rainsplash moving inoculum from infected buds across other green tissues of the tree, most crucially to developing nuts.

== Importance ==
Xanthomonas arboricola has an extraordinarily destructive potential when infecting crops. It is the most devastating blight on walnut, and can cause up to 100% yield loss if not properly managed. Its host range threatens stone fruits and other nuts. Epidemics have been reported in countries such as The United States, Iran, Turkey, and Italy. These outbreaks are not limited to just these countries, and without extensive epidemiological knowledge, it could spread with devastating effects. Through disease forecasting efforts, X. arboricola is known to have its highest virulence and growth rate at around 30 degrees Celsius. Temperature in addition to understanding regional humidity, could help prevent future epidemics in agriculture. Less moisture on the plants, and slightly cooler temperatures can hinder both the dispersal and growth of X. arboricola. In Australia an estimated 3.1 million AUD were lost on average due to yield losses from prunus spp. in years with pathogen prevalence. The pathogen's capability to survive in woody tissue over winter, or after plant death proves a major challenge for plant pathologists to find an effective solution.

== Management ==
Current management of bacterial walnut blight caused by Xanthomonas arboricola pv. juglandis is through copper-based bactericide sprays. Spraying is started just prior to early shoot emergence and continued at 7- to 10-day or longer intervals as necessary for disease control according to spring rainfall. This spraying regime is to continue until the end of August. Unfortunately, continuous use of copper-based bactericides lead to a buildup of copper in soil and can be related to yield loss in walnut orchards. A natural antibiotic produced by a strain of Streptomyces by the name of kasumin or kasugamycin has been found to have high efficacy against Xanthomonas arboricola pv. juglandis as a copper spray alternative under dry conditions. However, this same efficacy has not been found to hold up under moderate to heavy rainfall unless paired with a copper-based spray treatment.

With the overall lack of resistance and limited control measures, sanitation and irrigation are one of the most widely recommended modes of management. Proper irrigation and water management can help limit the amount of rain splash to prevent the rapid spread of disease. In preventing epidemics, it is recommended to plant certified propagation material; this inhibits the spread of epiphytic X. arboricola. Sanitation is crucial in stopping the distribution of this disease, given how widespread and destructive it can be.

Active projects are underway to breed for resistance for Xanthomonas arboricola, however, it is difficult to implement resistant varieties of the susceptible hosts. Current efforts to breed resistance have yet to be fully successful. A study in the United States developed partial resistance; all resistance genotypes continued to show at least one symptom. One of the best modes of controlling the spread of the disease is by testing nursery plants for the bacteria before planting. This helps to guarantee that quarantined fields are not introduced to the bacteria by a foreign contaminate. Providing healthy planting material can help stop the relative spread of Xanthomonas arboricola, however, this is good practice and not a definitive solution.
