= Stenotrophomonas ginsengisoli =

Scientific classification
- Domain: Bacteria
- Kingdom: Pseudomonadati
- Phylum: Pseudomonadota
- Class: Gammaproteobacteria
- Order: Lysobacterales
- Family: Lysobacteraceae
- Genus: Stenotrophomonas
- Species: S. ginsengisoli

Binomial name
- Stenotrophomonas ginsengisoli Kim et al. 2010

Type strain
- KCTC 12539, NBRC 101154, strain DCY01

Species of bacterium

Stenotrophomonas ginsengisoli is a Gram-negative, non-spore-forming and rod-shaped bacterium from the genus Stenotrophomonas which has been isolated from soil from a ginseng field in Korea.
