= Stenotrophomonas pavanii =

Scientific classification
- Domain: Bacteria
- Kingdom: Pseudomonadati
- Phylum: Pseudomonadota
- Class: Gammaproteobacteria
- Order: Lysobacterales
- Family: Lysobacteraceae
- Genus: Stenotrophomonas
- Species: S. pavanii

Binomial name
- Stenotrophomonas pavanii Ramos et al. 2011

Type strain
- CBMAI 564, LMG 25348, strain ICB 89

Species of bacterium

Stenotrophomonas pavanii is a nitrogen-fixing, Gram-negative, rod-shaped and non-spore-forming bacterium from the genus Stenotrophomonas which has been isolated from the stem of a sugar cane from Sao Francisco Sertaozinho in Brazil.
