= Stenotrophomonas chelatiphaga =

Scientific classification
- Domain: Bacteria
- Kingdom: Pseudomonadati
- Phylum: Pseudomonadota
- Class: Gammaproteobacteria
- Order: Lysobacterales
- Family: Lysobacteraceae
- Genus: Stenotrophomonas
- Species: S. chelatiphaga

Binomial name
- Stenotrophomonas chelatiphaga Kaparullina et al. 2010

Type strain
- CCUG 57178, DSM 21508, VKM B-2486, strain LPM-5

Synonyms
- Stenotrophomonas chelatovorus

Species of bacterium

Stenotrophomonas chelatiphaga is an aerobic, Gram-negative and motile bacterium from the genus Stenotrophomonas which has been isolated from sewage sludge from Kazan in Russia. Stenotrophomonas chelatiphaga has the ability to degrade Ethylenediaminetetraacetic acid.
