= Pseudoxanthomonas koreensis =

Scientific classification
- Domain: Bacteria
- Kingdom: Pseudomonadati
- Phylum: Pseudomonadota
- Class: Gammaproteobacteria
- Order: Lysobacterales
- Family: Lysobacteraceae
- Genus: Pseudoxanthomonas
- Species: P. koreensis

Binomial name
- Pseudoxanthomonas koreensis Yang et al. 2005

Species of bacterium

Pseudoxanthomonas koreensis is a species of Gram-negative, non-spore-forming, rod-shaped bacteria, first isolated from ginseng fields. T7-09(T) (=KCTC 12208(T) =IAM 15116(T)) is the type strain.
