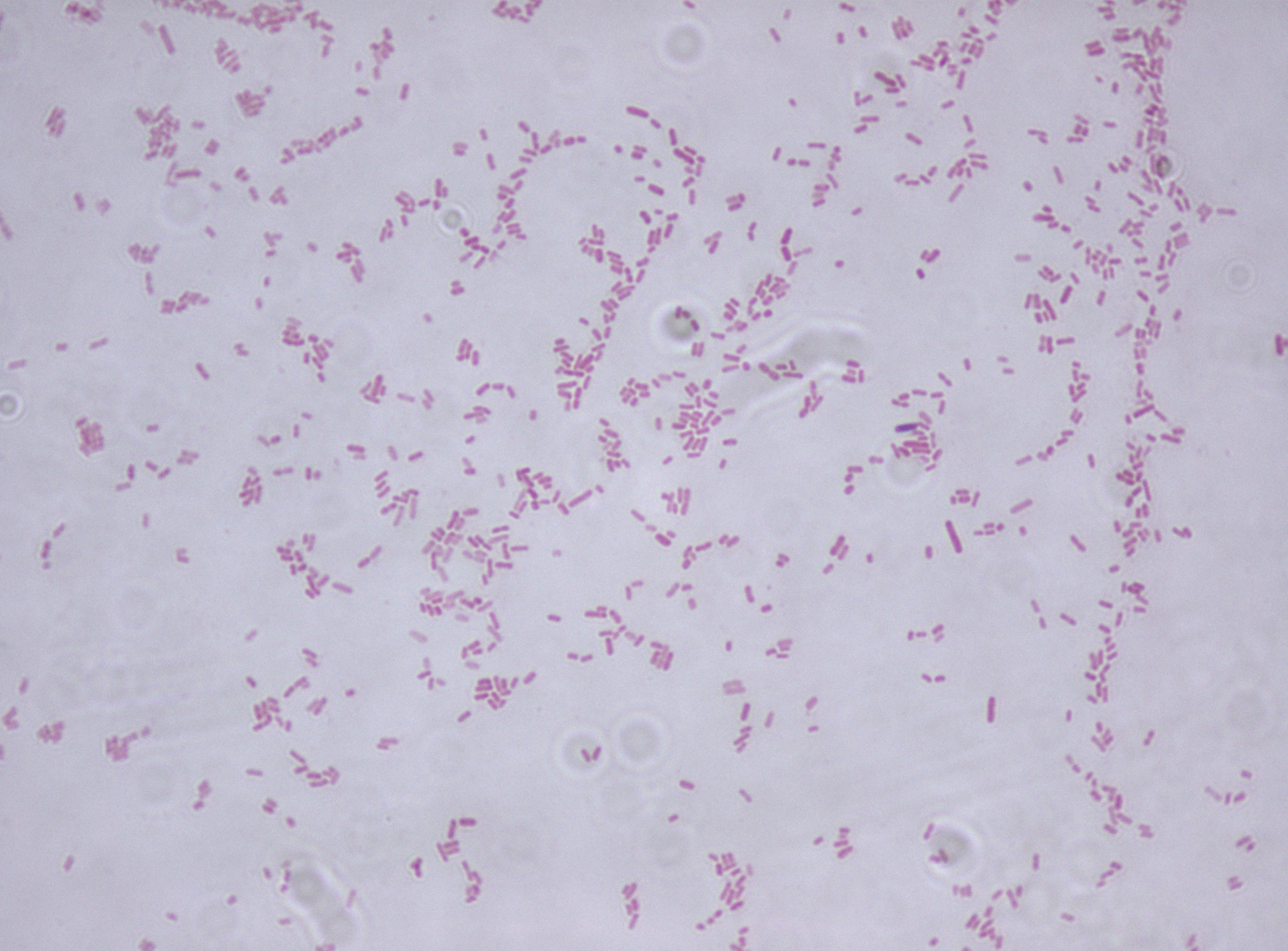
- Gram-stained Stenotrophomonas maltophilia

Scientific classification
- Domain: Bacteria
- Kingdom: Pseudomonadati
- Phylum: Pseudomonadota
- Class: Gammaproteobacteria
- Order: Lysobacterales
- Family: Lysobacteraceae
- Genus: Stenotrophomonas; Palleroni and Bradbury 1993

Species
- S. acidaminiphila S. africana S. aracearum S. bentonitica S. beteli S. capsici S. chelatiphaga S. cyclobalanopsidis S. daejeonensis S. forensis S. geniculata S. ginsengisoli S. goyi S. hibiscicola S. humi S. indicatrix S. koreensis S. lactitubi S. lacuserhaii S. maltophilia S. mori S. muris S. nematodicola S. nitritireducens S. oahuensis S. panacihumi S. pavanii S. pennii S. pictorum S. pigmentata S. rhizophila S. riyadhensis S. sepilia S. terrae S. tumulicola

= Stenotrophomonas =

Genus of bacteria

Stenotrophomonas is a genus of gram-negative bacteria, comprising at least twenty-six species. The main reservoirs of Stenotrophomonas are soil and plants. Stenotrophomonas species range from common soil organisms (S. nitritireducens) to opportunistic human pathogens (S. maltophilia); the taxonomy of the genus is still somewhat unclear.

== Importance ==
The most common species, S. maltophilia, is very versatile and can be beneficial for plant growth and health, can be used in agriculture, biocontrol, bioremediation and phytoremediation strategies as well as the production of biomolecules of economic value. On the other hand, some of S. maltophilia strains are opportunistic pathogens to humans with a multidrug resistant profile. S. indologenes can also cause or be part of polymicrobial infections in humans, especially small children. Most Stenotrophomonas generally are not phytopathogenic unlike closely related genera Xylella and Xanthomonas, however some Stenotrophomonas are pathogenic to plants like Stenotrophomonas beteli and Stenotrophomonas hibiscicola. Members of the genus Stenotrophomonas have an important ecological role in the nitrogen and sulphur cycles. Stenotrophomonas species, especially S. maltophilia and S. rhizophila, are often found in association with plants, such as cucumber, oilseed grape, potato, strawberry, alfalfa, sunflower, maize, rice, wheat, various weeds, willow and poplar. Stenotrophomonas can be isolated from the rhizosphere or from internal plant tissues, particularly from the vascular tissues of the root and stem.

== History ==
The first species described was S. maltophila by Hugh and Ryschenko in 1961. At the time it was named Pseudomonas maltophilia, but was later renamed to Xanthomonas maltophilia before the genus Stenotrophomonas was erected in 1993. The genus name (from the Greek ‘stenos’, meaning narrow, ‘trophus’, meaning one who feeds and ‘monas’, meaning unit) was intended to highlight the limited nutritional range of the bacterium. However, several studies subsequently demonstrated that the genus is capable of great metabolic versatility.

== Genetics ==
The full genome sequence of an environmental isolate, S. maltophilia R551‑3, and a clinical isolate, S. maltophilia K279a, are available. Both strains contain genes that encode type I pili, which have been implicated in adhesion and the early stages of biofilm formation, and type IV pili, which have been implicated in adherence, auto-aggregation, twitching motility and biofilm formation. Conserved distribution of pili-coding gene clusters in sequenced genomes may indicate similarities in the plant and animal colonization strategies.

The identification of Stenotrophomonas spp. is problematic, as these bacteria show no activities in most of the standard metabolism-based phenotyping panels. Additionally, the species are genotypically similar, with 95.7–99.6% 16S rRNA gene sequence similarities. One of the housekeeping genes gyrB, encoding the B-subunit of the DNA gyrase, has successfully employed for typing. Moreover, gyrB sequence comparisons, indicate that strains identified as S. maltophilia may represent distinct new species. A phylogenomic analysis of genomic sequences that were deposited into the National Center for Biotechnology Information GenBank as S. maltophilia revealed that many genomic sequences are misidentified as S. maltophilia and instead there are multiple cryptic species in the genus, with some Stenotrophomonas species associated with clinical diseases in humans.

Small palindromic elements that carry tetranucleotide GTAG at one terminus were found to be widespread in the genome of Stenotrophomonas maltophilia. The repeats are species-specific variants of the superfamily of repetitive extragenic palindromes (REPs). Hundreds of genes are immediately flanked by these repeats and they likely function as RNA control sequences by the folding of the repeats in the mRNA and either stabilizing upstream transcripts or favoring their degradation.

== Metabolism ==
Stenotrophomonas spp. can efficiently colonize such different biotopes as plants, humans and marine environments. Stenotrophomonas spp. metabolize a large range of organic compounds present in the rhizosphere, including phenolic compounds found in plant root exudates. S. maltophilia can degrade p‑nitrophenol and 4‑chlorophenol, polycyclic aromatic hydrocarbons, selenium compounds, benzene, toluene, ethylbenzene and xenobiotics. Stenotrophomonas spp. produces plant growth hormone indole‑3‑acetic acid (IAA), it can also promote plant growth due to nitrogen fixation and the oxidation of elemental sulphur, which in turn provides sulphate for the plants. Many S. maltophilia strains have intrinsic resistance to various heavy metals. Most S. maltophilia isolates produce antifungal compounds, such as maltophilin and xanthobaccin or volatile organic compounds with antifungal activity. S. maltophilia strains have an extraordinarily high hydrolytic potential; they produce diverse proteases, chitinases, glucanases, DNases, RNases, lipases and laccases. S. maltophilia are equipped for iron uptake, as they produce the siderophore enterobactin and many TonB‑dependent receptors (TBDRs) used for the active transport of iron–siderophore complexes.
