= Luteimonas =

Scientific classification
- Domain: Bacteria
- Kingdom: Pseudomonadati
- Phylum: Pseudomonadota
- Class: Gammaproteobacteria
- Order: Lysobacterales
- Family: Lysobacteraceae
- Genus: Luteimonas; Finkmann et al. 2000

Type species
- Luteimonas mephitis

Species
- Luteimonas abyssi Luteimonas aestuarii Luteimonas aquatica Luteimonas composti Luteimonas cucumeris Luteimonas huabeiensis Luteimonas lutimaris Luteimonas marina Luteimonas mephitis Luteimonas terricola Luteimonas vadosa

Genus of bacteria

Luteimonas is a genus of Pseudomonadota bacteria from the family Lysobacteraceae.
