= Arenimonas =

Scientific classification
- Domain: Bacteria
- Kingdom: Pseudomonadati
- Phylum: Pseudomonadota
- Class: Gammaproteobacteria
- Order: Lysobacterales
- Family: Lysobacteraceae
- Genus: Arenimonas; Kwon et al. 2007

Type species
- Arenimonas donghaensis

Species
- A. aestuarii A. alkanexedens A. caeni A. composti A. daechungensis A. daejeonensis A. donghaensis A. halophila A. malthae A. maotaiensis A. metalli A. oryziterrae A. soli A. subflava A. taoyuanensis

Synonyms
- Aspromonas

Genus of bacteria

Arenimonas is a genus of Pseudomonadota from the family Lysobacteraceae.
