= Mizugakiibacter =

Scientific classification
- Domain: Bacteria
- Kingdom: Pseudomonadati
- Phylum: Pseudomonadota
- Class: Gammaproteobacteria
- Order: Lysobacterales
- Family: Lysobacteraceae
- Genus: Mizugakiibacter; Kojima et al. 2014
- Species: M. sediminis

Binomial name
- Mizugakiibacter sediminis Kojima et al. 2014

Genus of bacteria

Mizugakiibacter is a Gram-negative genus of Pseudomonadota from the family Lysobacteraceae with one known species (Mizugakiibacter sediminis). Mizugakiibacter sediminis has been isolated from sediments from the Lake Mizugaki in Japan.
