= Metallibacterium =

Scientific classification
- Domain: Bacteria
- Kingdom: Pseudomonadati
- Phylum: Pseudomonadota
- Class: Gammaproteobacteria
- Order: Lysobacterales
- Family: Lysobacteraceae
- Genus: Metallibacterium; Ziegler et al. 2013
- Species: M. scheffleri

Binomial name
- Metallibacterium scheffleri Ziegler et al. 2013

Genus of bacteria

Metallibacterium is a Gram-negative genus of Pseudomonadota from the family of Lysobacteraceae with one known species (Metallibacterium scheffleri). Metallibacterium scheffleri has been isolated from acidic biofilm from a pyrite mine from the Harz Mountain in Germany.
