= Luteimonas aestuarii =

Scientific classification
- Domain: Bacteria
- Kingdom: Pseudomonadati
- Phylum: Pseudomonadota
- Class: Gammaproteobacteria
- Order: Lysobacterales
- Family: Lysobacteraceae
- Genus: Luteimonas
- Species: L. aestuarii

Binomial name
- Luteimonas aestuarii Roh et al. 2009

Species of bacterium

Luteimonas aestuarii is a species of yellow-pigmented bacteria. It is Gram-negative and rod-shaped, and its type strain is B9(T) (= KCTC 22048(T), DSM 19680(T)). The species was first isolated from sediment from a tidal flat.
