= Xanthomonas boreopolis =

Scientific classification
- Domain: Bacteria
- Kingdom: Pseudomonadati
- Phylum: Pseudomonadota
- Class: Gammaproteobacteria
- Order: Lysobacterales
- Family: Lysobacteraceae
- Genus: Xanthomonas
- Species: X. boreopolis

Binomial name
- Xanthomonas boreopolis (Gray and Thornton 1928) Fatahi-Bafghi 2025

Synonyms
- "Xanthomonas boreopolis" (Gray and Thornton 1928) Tripathi et al. 2024; Pseudomonas boreopolis Gray and Thornton 1928 (Approved Lists 1980)

Species of bacterium

Xanthomonas boreopolis is a species of Gram-negative bacteria. Following 16S rRNA phylogenetic analysis, it was determined that it belonged in the Xanthomonas—Xylella rRNA lineage.
