= Velvetleaf =

Velvetleaf (or "velvet leaf", etc.) is a common name used for plants with soft-haired leaves:

- Abutilon theophrasti native to southern Asia
- Cissampelos pareira, native to tropical America
- Malva arborea, native to Europe
- Limnocharis flava, native to tropical America and introduced to southeast Asia
