= Xanthomonas euvesicatoria =

Scientific classification
- Domain: Bacteria
- Kingdom: Pseudomonadati
- Phylum: Pseudomonadota
- Class: Gammaproteobacteria
- Order: Lysobacterales
- Family: Lysobacteraceae
- Genus: Xanthomonas
- Species: X. euvesicatoria

Binomial name
- Xanthomonas euvesicatoria Jones et al. 2006

Species of bacterium

Xanthomonas euvesicatoria is a species of bacteria.
