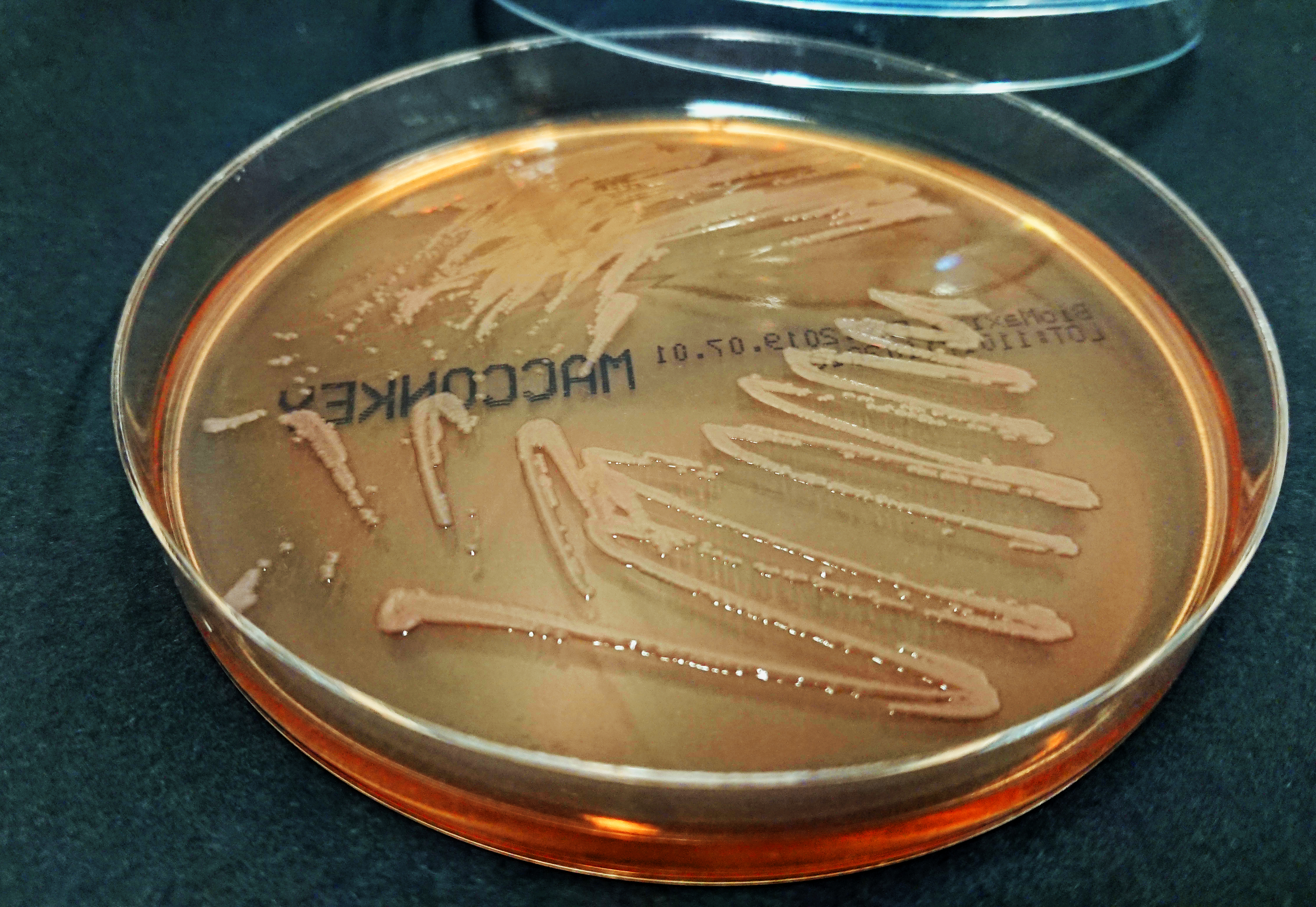
- Stenotrophomonas maltophilia clinical isolates on MacConkey agar

Scientific classification
- Domain: Bacteria
- Kingdom: Pseudomonadati
- Phylum: Pseudomonadota
- Class: Gammaproteobacteria
- Order: Lysobacterales
- Family: Lysobacteraceae
- Genus: Stenotrophomonas
- Species: S. maltophilia

Binomial name
- Stenotrophomonas maltophilia Palleroni & Bradbury 1993

Synonyms
- Pseudomonas maltophilia (ex Hugh and Ryschenkow 1961) Hugh 1981; Xanthomonas maltophilia (Hugh 1981) Swings et al. 1983; Pseudomonas hibiscicola Moniz 1963; Pseudomonas beteli corrig. (Ragunathan 1928) Savulescu 1947

= Stenotrophomonas maltophilia =

Species of bacterium

Stenotrophomonas maltophilia is an aerobic, nonfermentative, Gram-negative bacterium. It is an uncommon bacterium, and human infection is difficult to treat. Initially classified as Bacterium bookeri, then renamed Pseudomonas maltophilia, S. maltophilia was also grouped in the genus Xanthomonas before eventually becoming the type species of the genus Stenotrophomonas in 1993.

Stenotrophomonas maltophilia is slightly smaller (0.7–1.8 × 0.4–0.7 μm) than other members of the genus. They are motile due to polar flagella, and grow well on MacConkey agar, producing pigmented colonies. S. maltophilia is catalase-positive, oxidase-negative (which distinguishes it from most other members of the genus) and has a positive reaction for extracellular DNase.

Stenotrophomonas maltophilia is ubiquitous in aqueous environments, soil, and plants; it has also been used in biotechnology applications. In immunocompromised patients, S. maltophilia can lead to nosocomial infections. It is also an emerging nosocomial pathogen associated with opportunistic infections in patients with cystic fibrosis, cancer, and HIV/AIDS. Adherence of this organism to abiotic surfaces such as medical implants and catheters represents a major risk for hospitalized patients.

== Pathogenesis ==
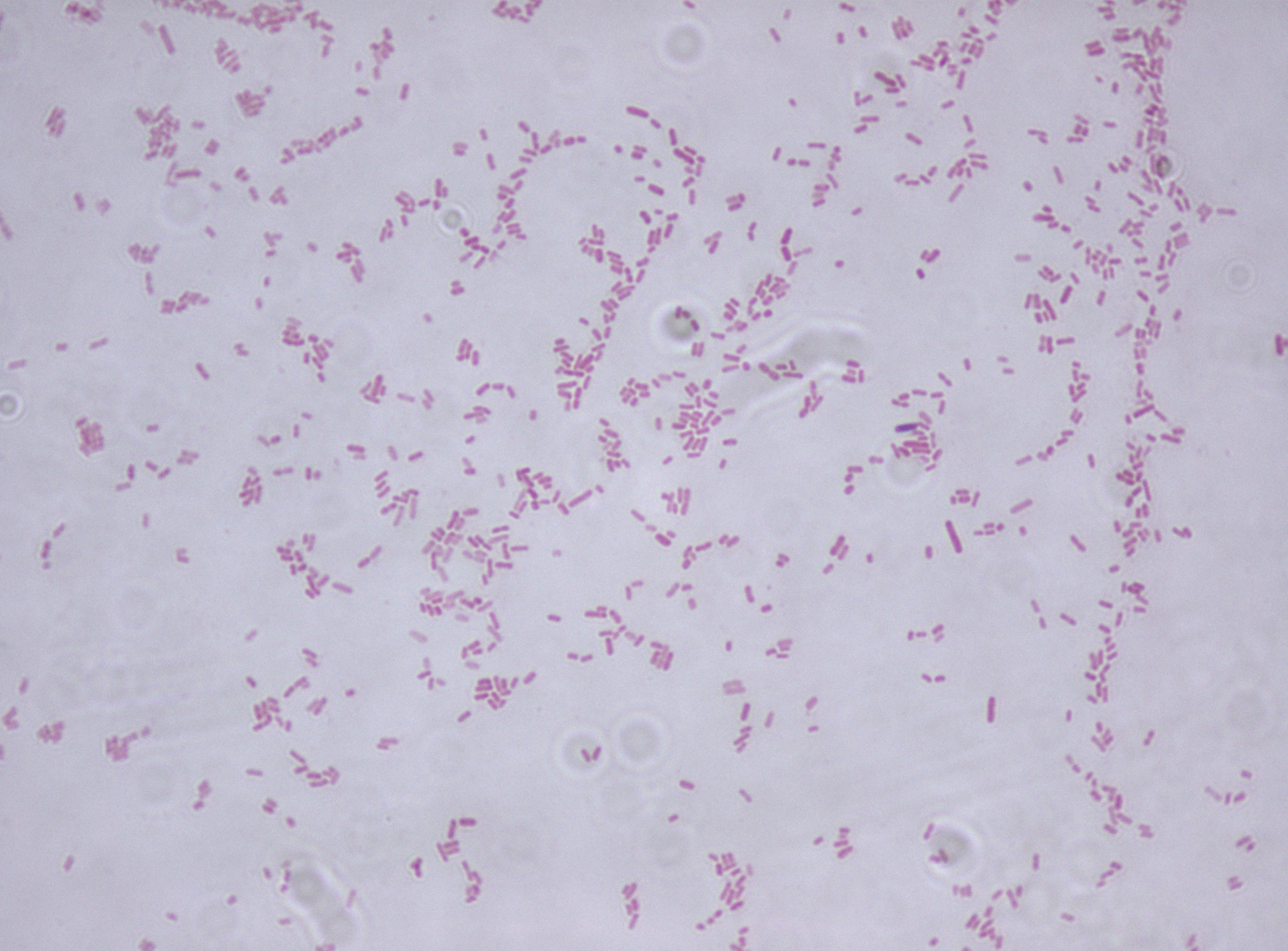
Gram-stained S. maltophilia

Stenotrophomonas maltophilia frequently colonizes humid surfaces such as the tubes used in mechanical ventilation and indwelling urinary catheters, as well as medical devices such as suction catheters and endoscopes. Infection is usually facilitated by the presence of prosthetic material (plastic or metal), and the most effective treatment is removal of the prosthetic material (usually a central venous catheter or similar device). S. maltophilia adheres strongly and forms biofilm on plastic surfaces, although these abilities may vary greatly between strains. Hydrophobicity was correlated to successful adhesion and biofilm formation on polystyrene surfaces. S. maltophilia frequently co-occurs and forms multispecies biofilms with Pseudomonas aeruginosa. S. maltophilia substantially influences the architecture of P. aeruginosa structures, causing the development of extended filaments. These changes arise due to diffusible signalling factor encoded by S. maltophilia.

The growth of S. maltophilia in microbiological cultures of respiratory or urinary specimens is difficult to interpret due to its low pathogenicity, and is not proof of infection. If, however, it is grown from sites which would be normally sterile (e.g., blood), then it usually represents true infection. S. maltophilia can be found in the flora of captive snakes.

In immunocompetent individuals, S. maltophilia is a relatively unusual cause of pneumonia, urinary tract infection, or bloodstream infection; in immunocompromised patients, however, S. maltophilia is a growing source of latent pulmonary infections. S. maltophilia colonization rates in individuals with cystic fibrosis have been increasing.

Deliberate induction of inflammatory responses is the main pathogenic mechanism of S. maltophilia infection. S. maltophilia secretes outer membrane vesicles (OMVs), which cause an inflammatory response. OMVs from S. maltophilia ATCC 13637 were found to be cytotoxic to human lung epithelial cells. These OMVs stimulate the expression of proinflammatory cytokine and chemokine genes, including interleukin (IL)-1β, IL-6, IL-8, tumor necrosis factor-α and monocyte chemoattractant protein-1.

== Treatment ==
Stenotrophomonas maltophilia is naturally resistant to many broad-spectrum antibiotics (including all carbapenems) due to the production of two inducible chromosomal metallo-β-lactamases (designated L1 and L2). This makes treatment of infected patients very difficult. S. maltophilia is ubiquitously present in the environment and impossible to eradicate, which makes prevention also extremely difficult.

Sensitivity testing requires nonstandard culture techniques (incubation at 30 °C). Testing at the wrong temperature results in isolates being incorrectly reported as being susceptible when they are, in fact, resistant. Disc diffusion methods should not be used, as they are unreliable, and agar dilution should be used instead.

Stenotrophomonas maltophilia is not a virulent organism, and removal of the infected prosthesis is frequently sufficient to cure the infection; antibiotics are only required if the prosthesis cannot be removed. Many strains of S. maltophilia are sensitive to co-trimoxazole and ticarcillin, though resistance has been increasing. It is usually susceptible to piperacillin and ceftazidime. Tigecycline is also an effective drug. Polymyxin B may be effective treatment, at least in vitro, though not without frequent adverse effects.

== Epidemiology ==
Stenotrophomonas infections have been associated with high morbidity and mortality in severely immunocompromised and debilitated individuals. Risk factors associated with Stenotrophomonas infection include HIV infection, malignancy, cystic fibrosis, neutropenia, mechanical ventilation, extracorporeal membrane oxygenation, central venous catheters, recent surgery, trauma, prolonged hospitalization, intensive care unit admission and broad-spectrum antibiotic use.

== History ==
Stenotrophomonas maltophilia has had multiple different names in the past. It was first found in a pleural effusion in 1943 and given the name Bacterium bookeri. It was then renamed to Pseudomonas maltophilia in 1961. It was moved to the genus Xanthomonas in 1983 and most recently to Stenotrophomonas in 1993.
