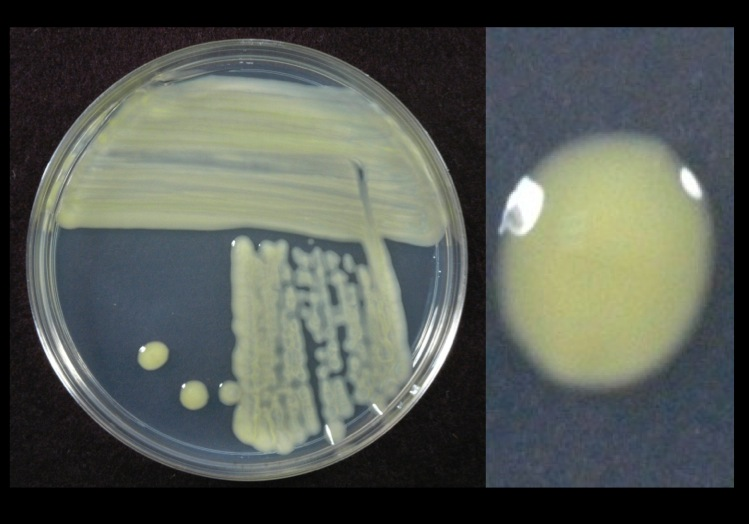
- Xanthomonas translucens growing on sucrose peptone agar showing yellow pigment

Scientific classification
- Domain: Bacteria
- Kingdom: Pseudomonadati
- Phylum: Pseudomonadota
- Class: Gammaproteobacteria
- Order: Lysobacterales
- Family: Lysobacteraceae
- Genus: Xanthomonas; Dowson 1939

Species
- X. albilineans X. alfalfae X. ampelina X. arboricola X. axonopodis X. boreopolis X. badrii X. bromi X. campestris X. cassavae X. citri X. codiaei X. cucurbitae X. cyanopsidis X. cynarae X. euvesicatoria X. fragariae X. gardneri X. holcicola X. hortorum X. hyacinthi X. maliensis X. malvacearum X. maltophila X. manihotis X. melonis X. nasturtii X. oryzae X. papavericola X. perforans X. phaseoli X. pisi X. populi X. pruni X. sacchari X. theicola X. translucens X. vasicola X. vesicatoria

= Xanthomonas =

Genus of bacteria

Xanthomonas (from greek: xanthos – "yellow"; monas – "entity") is a genus of bacteria, many of which cause plant diseases. There are at least 27 plant associated Xanthomonas spp., that all together infect at least 400 plant species. Different species typically have specific host and/or tissue range and colonization strategies.

== Taxonomy ==
The genus Xanthomonas has been subject of numerous taxonomic and phylogenetic studies and was first described as Bacterium vesicatorium as a pathogen of pepper and tomato in 1921. Dowson later reclassified the bacterium as Xanthomonas campestris and proposed the genus Xanthomonas.Xanthomonas was first described as a monotypic genus and further research resulted in the division into two groups, A and B. Later work using DNA:DNA hybridization has served as a framework for the general Xanthomonas species classification. Other tools, including multilocus sequence analysis and amplified fragment-length polymorphism, have been used for classification within clades. While previous research has illustrated the complexity of the genus Xanthomonas, recent research appears to have resulted in a clearer picture. More recently, genome-wide analysis of multiple Xanthomonas strains mostly supports the previous phylogenies.

Plant-pathogenic Xanthomonas spp. are evolutionary linked to opportunistic human pathogen Stenotrophomonas maltophilia, that was previously called Xanthomonas maltophilia.

There is a proposal to reorganize Xanthomonas banana and maize/corn pathotypes along the lines of the most recent phylogenetic data.

There is a proposal to unify Xylella into Xanthomonas on the basis of paraphyly (Xylella branches within Xanthomonas). The same study has a more radical proposal to unify Stenotrophomonas and Pseudoxanthomonas into Xanthomonas on the basis of insufficient divergence. Although GTDB acknowledges the paraphyly of Xanthomonas and also uses a divergence-based genus assignment method, it does not endorse a "lumper" view. It instead splits Xanthomonas into three genera (defined around X. campestris, X. albilineans, and "X. massiliensis" respectively) without merging.

=== Reclassification hotspots ===
Xanthomonas axonopodis is at the center of a species complex that includes X. citri, X. euvesicatoria (including X. perforans and X. alfalfae), and X. phaseoli. Each of these species have been relatively recently split out and numerous strains or pathovars may still be incorrectly associated with X. axonopodis.

Pathovars that should be X. citri have been mislabeled X. axonopodis, X. campestris, and X. cissicola. Pathovars that should be X. euvesicatoria or X. varsicola have been mislabeled X. campestris.

== Morphology and growth ==
Individual cell characteristics include:

- Cell type – straight rods
- Size – 0.4 – 1.0 μm wide by 1.2 – 3.0 μm long
- Motility – motile by a single polar flagellum

Colony growth characteristics include:

- Mucoid, convex, and yellow colonies on YDC medium
- Yellow pigment from xanthomonadin, which contains bromine
- Most produce large amounts of extracellular polysaccharide
- Temperature range – 4 to 37 °C, optimal growth 25–30 °C

Biochemical and physiological test results are:

- Gram stain – negative
- Obligate aerobes
- Catalase positive
- Oxidase negative

== Xanthomonas plant pathogens ==
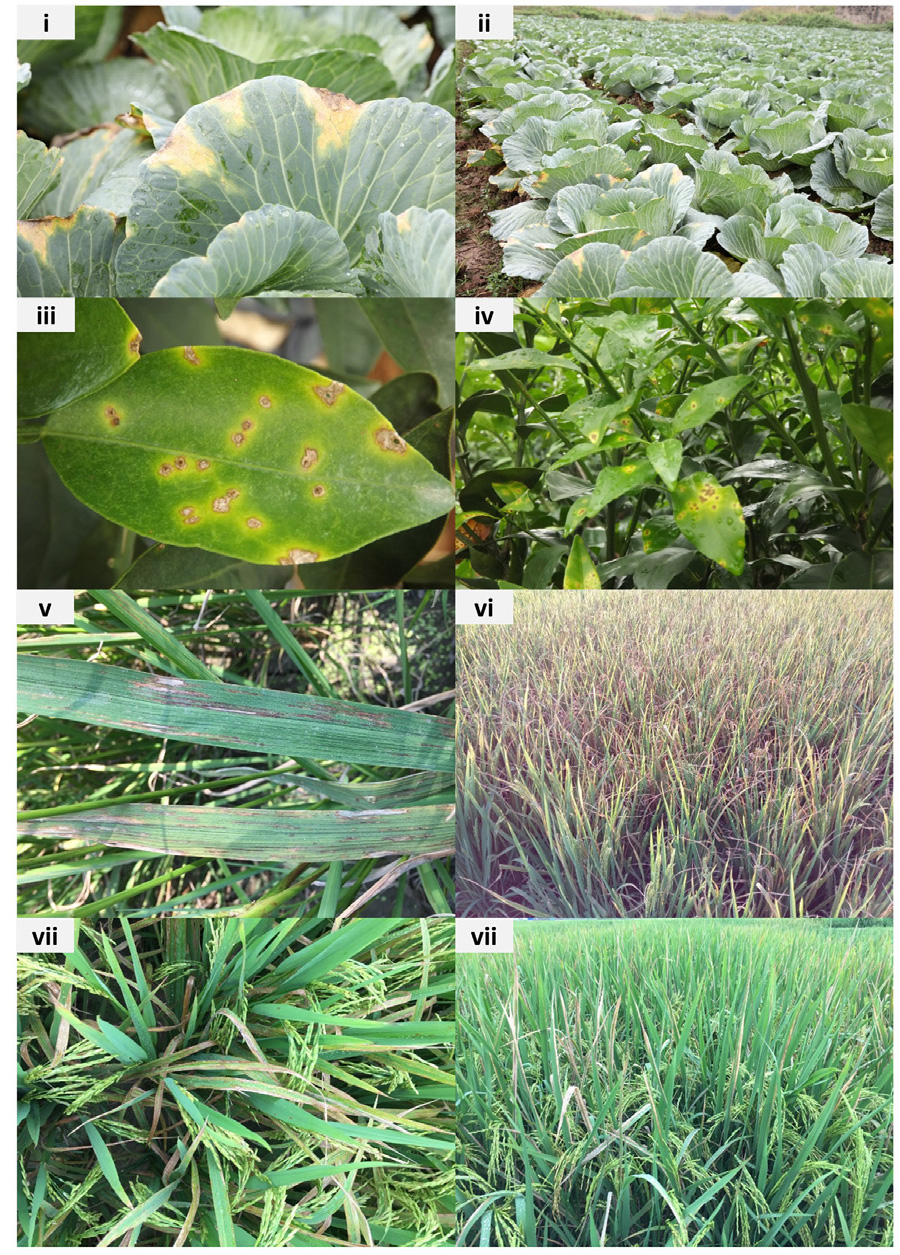
Symptoms of diseases caused by Xanthomonas

Xanthomonas species can cause bacterial spots and blights of leaves, stems, and fruits on a wide variety of plant species. Pathogenic species show high degrees of specificity and some are split into multiple pathovars, a species designation based on host specificity.

- Citrus canker, caused by Xanthomonas citri subsp. citri is an economically important disease of many citrus species (lime, orange, lemon, pamelo, etc.)
- Bacterial leaf spot of peppers and tomato has caused significant crop losses over the years. Causes of this disease include four pathovars of Xanthomonas across three species. In some areas where infection begins soon after transplanting, the total crop can be lost as a result of this disease.
- Xanthomonas campestris pv. punicae cause bacterial blight of pomogranate.
- Bacterial blight of rice, caused by Xanthomonas oryzae pv. oryzae, is a disease found worldwide and particularly destructive in the rice-producing regions in Asia.

== Plant pathogenesis and disease control ==
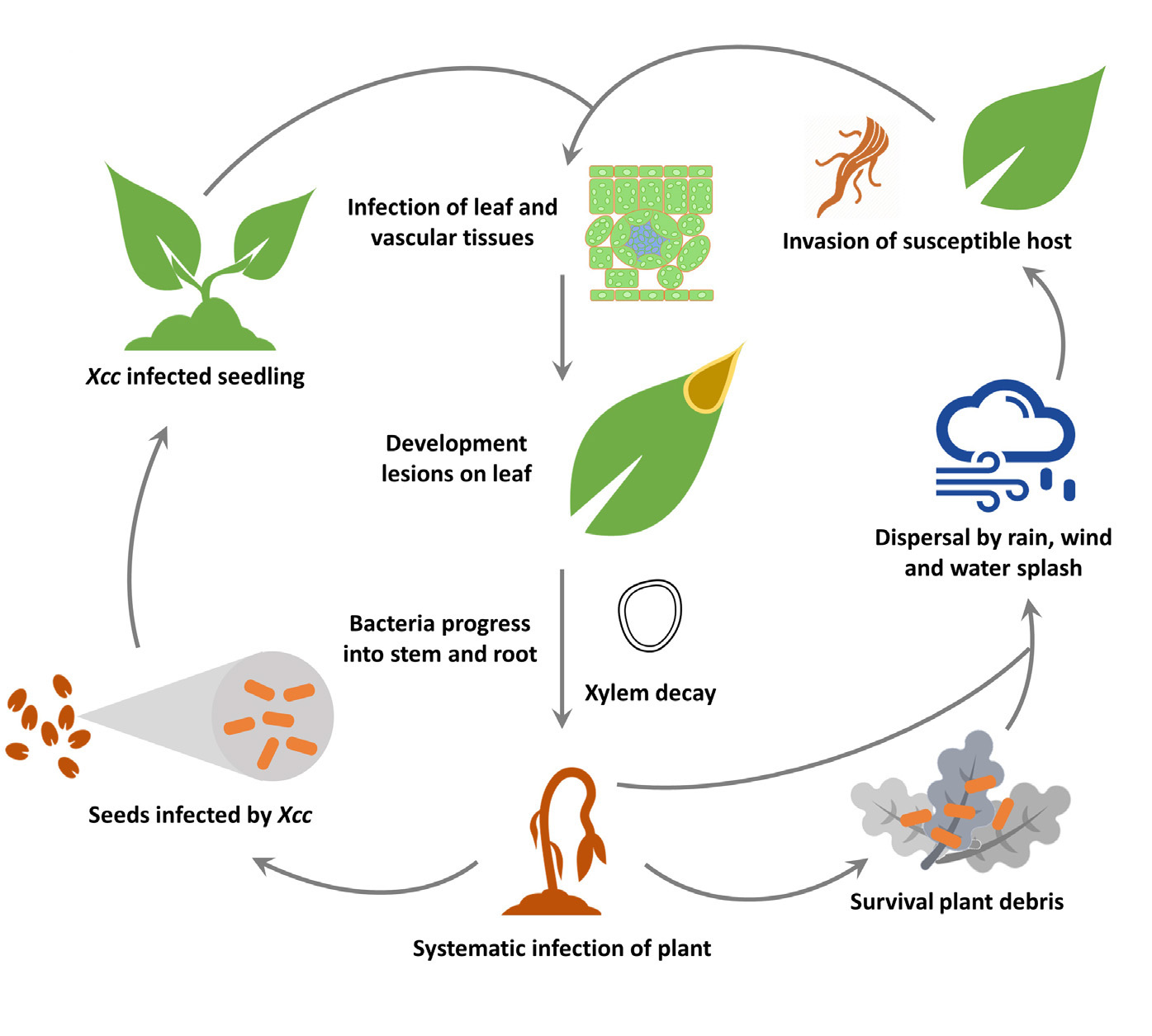
Xanthomonas spp. life cycle

Contaminated seeds, weeds, infected plant debris are the main route of transmission. Infection starts with epiphytic stage – i.e. bacteria grow on the aerial tissues of plant host (leaf, fruit, etc) followed by endophytic stage when bacteria enter and colonise host tissues through wounds or natural openings. When population of bacteria increases it re-emerges to the surface and is transmitted mainly by wind, rain or through seeds or agricultural machinery, while animal and insect vectors seems to play minor role.

Xanthomonas uses surface polysacharides, adhesion proteins and type IV pili to attach to the surface and can form biofilms to sustain abiotic stresses (UV, drought, etc). Xanthomonas produce xanthomonadins - yellow pigments that protect from radiation caused from natural light. Resistance to UV is mostly conferred by genes related to oxidative stress and DNA repair. Response to light is important in pathogenicity of these bacteria and regulates surface attachment and production of biofilm.

Xanthomonas possess almost all known secretion systems (types I to VI) that play different roles in the life and disease cycle, with type III secretion system (T3SS) being the key factor of pathogenicity. Typically, Xanthomonas T3SS injects a cocktail of 20-30 effector proteins that interfere with plant immune system and various host cellular processes. Many of the effectors are presumably redundant as individual deletions of effector genes does not impair virulence, however mutations in T3SS apparatus has strong effect. Secretion of the effectors is coordinated with expression of other virulence factors via shared regulatory networks. The effector repertoire has been proposed to be a determinant of host specificity. Xanthomonas actively kill other bacterial using type IV secretion system and defend itself from amoeba using type VI secretion system.

To prevent infections, limiting the introduction of the bacteria is key. Some resistant cultivars of certain plant species are available as this may be the most economical means for controlling this disease. For chemical control, preventative applications are best to reduce the potential for bacterial development. Copper-containing products offer some protection along with field-grade antibiotics such as oxytetracycline, which is labeled for use on some food crops in the United States. Curative applications of chemical pesticides may slow or reduce the spread of the bacterium, but will not cure already diseased plants. It is important to consult chemical pesticide labels when attempting to control bacterial diseases, as different Xanthomonas species can have different responses to these applications. Over-reliance on chemical control methods can also result in the selection of resistant isolates, so these applications should be considered a last resort.

Potential use of bacteriophages is also considered, however major limiting factors are their sensitivity to environmental conditions and in particular to UV radiation. Plant beneficial microorganisms or attenuated strains of Xanthomonas are being tested as a biocontrol reasoning that they could compete by occupying the same niche and even eradicate pathogenic strain. Generation of plant species resistant to Xanthomonas is another potential strategy.

== Industrial use ==
Xanthomonas species produce an edible polysaccharide called xanthan gum that has a wide range of industrial uses, including foods, petroleum products, and cosmetics. Xanthan also plays role in the disease cycle of Xanthomonas. In particular, xanthan gum is one of the main components of biofilm matrix. Biofilms help these bacteria sustain abiotic stresses on the leaf surface. Genes for Xanthan gum biosynthesis comprise the gum operon (gumB-gymM) coding for 12 enzymes. Xanthan production by Xanthomonas spp. that thrive in vascular plant systems might block the water flow of the plant and as a result cause wilting.

== Xanthomonas resources ==
Isolates of most species of Xanthomonas are available from the National Collection of Plant Pathogenic Bacteria in the United Kingdom and other international culture collections such as ICMP in New Zealand, CFBP in France, and VKM in Russia. It also can be taken out from MTCC India.

Multiple genomes of Xanthomonas have been sequenced and additional data sets/tools are available at The Xanthomonas Resource and at PhytoBacExplorer.
