= Lysobacteraceae =

Scientific classification
- Domain: Bacteria
- Kingdom: Pseudomonadati
- Phylum: Pseudomonadota
- Class: Gammaproteobacteria
- Order: Lysobacterales
- Family: Lysobacteraceae; Christensen and Cook 1978 (Approved Lists 1980)

Type genus
- Lysobacter Christensen and Cook 1978 (Approved Lists 1980)

Genera
- Alkalisalibacterium; Arenimonas; Chujaibacter; Coralloluteibacterium; Luteimonas; Lysobacter; Metallibacterium; Mizugakiibacter; Pseudolysobacter; Pseudomarimonas; Pseudoxanthomonas; Silanimonas; Stenotrophomonas; Thermomonas; Vulcaniibacterium; Xanthomonas; Xylella incertae sedis: Pseudomonas boreopolis

Synonyms
- Xanthomonadaceae

Family of bacteria

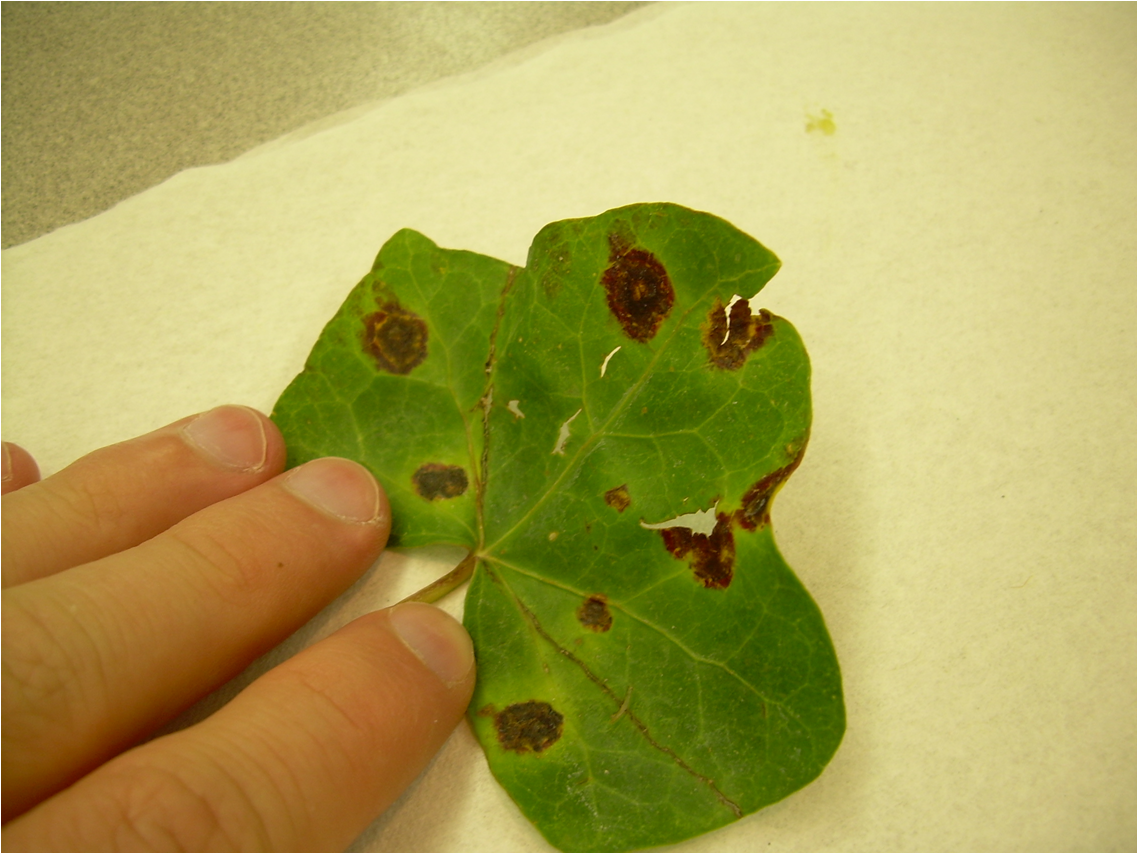
Xanthomonas hortorum pv. hederae leaf spot on English ivy English ivy (Hedera helix L.).

Xanthomonadaceae is a family of Pseudomonadota within the order Xanthomonadales. It was previously known as Lysobacteraceae.
