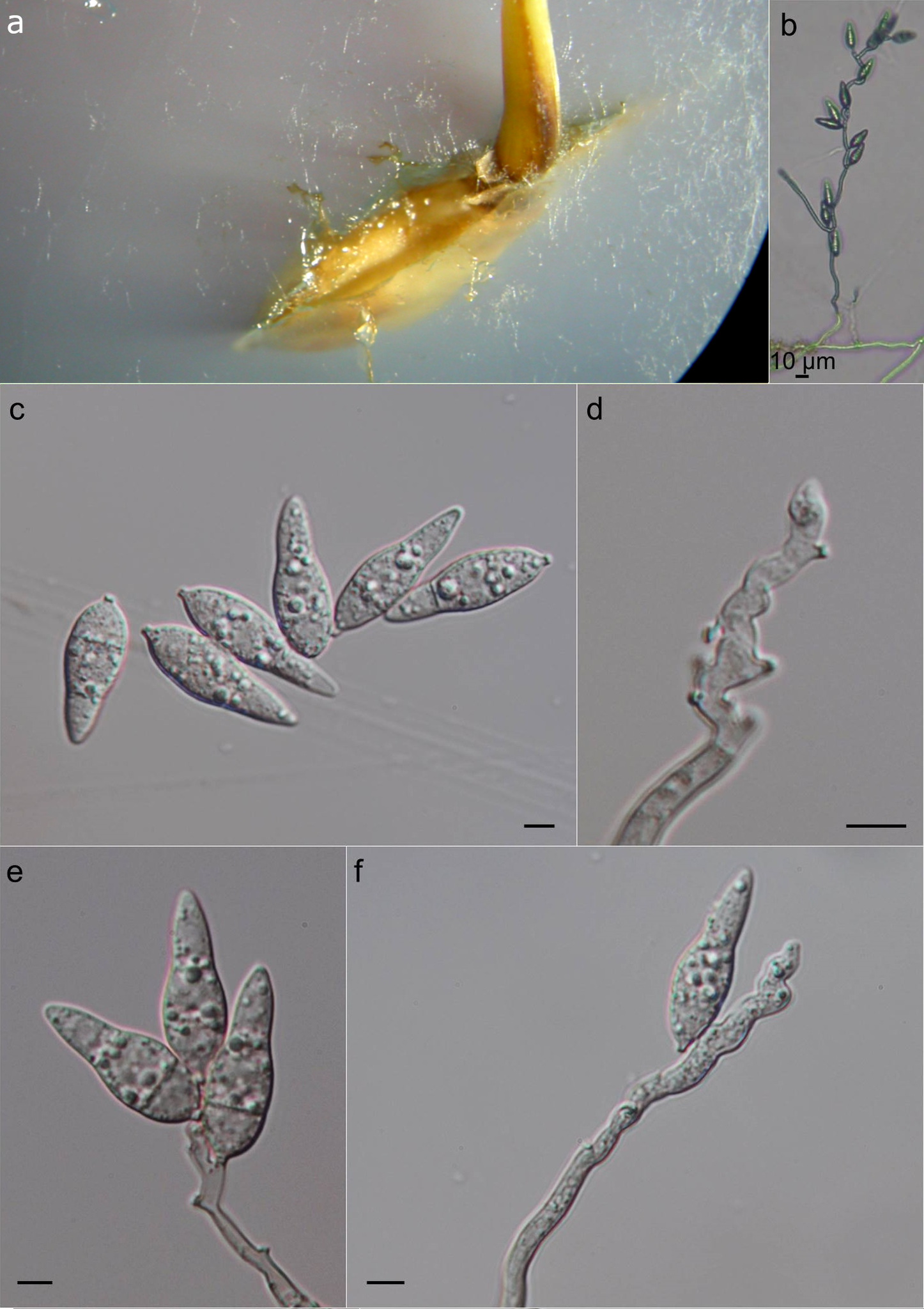
- Pyricularia oryzae

Scientific classification
- Kingdom: Fungi
- Division: Ascomycota
- Class: Sordariomycetes
- Order: Magnaporthales
- Family: Pyriculariaceae
- Genus: Pyricularia; Sacc. 1880

Species
- See text.

= Pyricularia =

Genus of fungi

Pyricularia is a genus of fungi which was named by Saccardo in 1880.

The polyphyletic nature of Pyricularia has been resolved and species of Pyricularia s. str. were shown to belong to a monophyletic clade (including Pyricularia grisea isolates), defining the family Pyriculariaceae.

== Etymology ==
The genus Pyricularia is named after the pyriform (pear-shaped) shape of its conidia.

== Pathogenicity ==
The genus Pyricularia includes species that are pathogenic on a wide range of monocot plants. For example, Pyricularia oryzae (sexual morph Magnaporthe oryzae), the causal agent of the rice blast disease, is one of the most widely distributed diseases of rice, and is highly destructive leading to up to 30% yield loss worldwide. Pyricularia oryzae isolates from rice are mostly host-specific and infect only few host plants beside rice (barley and Lolium). Pyricularia oryzae isolates from other host plants such as Eleusine, Setaria and Triticum are also host-specific, and unable to infect rice. The closely related species P. oryzae and Pyricularia grisea are indistinguishable in morphology of conidium, perithecium and ascopore. Pyricularia grisea isolates from Digitaria were shown to form a distinct clade by phylogenetic analysis and infect crabgrass (Digitaria), but not other hosts. However, some P. oryzae isolates from rice and other grasses and some P. grisea isolates from crabgrass were described to show cross-infectivity on crabgrass and rice, respectively.

== Sexual morphs ==
Sexual morphs were reported for P. grisea and P. oryzae. The genus Pyricularia comprises several other species for which the sexual morph has not yet been discovered.

== Species ==
- Pyricularia angulata
- Pyricularia apiculata
- Pyricularia borealis
- Pyricularia buloloensis
- Pyricularia caffra
- Pyricularia cannae
- Pyricularia cannicola
- Pyricularia caricis
- Pyricularia commelinicola
- Pyricularia costi
- Pyricularia costina
- Pyricularia curcumae
- Pyricularia cyperi
- Pyricularia didyma
- Pyricularia digitariae
- Pyricularia distorta
- Pyricularia dubiosa
- Pyricularia ebbelsii
- Pyricularia echinochloae
- Pyricularia euphorbiae
- Pyricularia fusispora
- Pyricularia globbae
- Pyricularia grisea
- Pyricularia guarumaicola
- Pyricularia juncicola
- Pyricularia kookicola
- Pyricularia lauri
- Pyricularia leersiae
- Pyricularia longispora
- Pyricularia lourinae
- Pyricularia luzulae
- Pyricularia occidentalis
- Pyricularia oncosperma
- Pyricularia oryzae
- Pyricularia panici-paludosi
- Pyricularia parasitica
- Pyricularia penniseti
- Pyricularia peruamazonica
- Pyricularia pyricularioides
- Pyricularia rabaulensis
- Pyricularia sansevieriae
- Pyricularia scripta
- Pyricularia setariae
- Pyricularia sphaerulata
- Pyricularia submersa
- Pyricularia subsigmoidea
- Pyricularia vandalurensis
- Pyricularia variabilis
- Pyricularia whetzelii
- Pyricularia zingiberis
- Pyricularia zizaniicola

== Taxonomy ==
Conidia are solitary, pyriform to obclavate, narrowed toward tip, rounded at the base, 2-septate, hyaline to pale brown, with a distinct basal hilum, sometimes with marginal frill.

Type species: Pyricularia grisea Sacc., Michelia 2(no. 6): 20. 1880.

=== Family ===
Species of Pyricularia s. str. belong to a monophyletic clade that includes P. oryzae/P. grisea isolates, and was defined as Pyriculariaceae. Pyriculariaceae is sister to the Ophioceraceae, representing two novel families. These clades are clearly distinct from species belonging to the Gaeumannomyces pro parte/Magnaporthiopsis/Nakataea generic complex that are monophyletic and define the family Magnaporthaceae.
