= Magnaporthe rhizophila =

Scientific classification
- Kingdom: Fungi
- Division: Ascomycota
- Class: Sordariomycetes
- Order: Magnaporthales
- Family: Magnaporthaceae
- Genus: Magnaporthe
- Species: M. rhizophila

Binomial name
- Magnaporthe rhizophila D.B. Scott & Deacon

Magnaporthe rhizophila
- Mycological characteristics
- Hymenium attachment is not applicable
- Lacks a stipe
- Spore print is black
- Edibility is unknown

Magnaporthe rhizophila is a fungus species in the family Magnaporthaceae. These dark mycelial fungi are common pathogens of cereal and grass roots. Rice blast is one disease known to be caused by M. rhizophila and presents with vascular discoloration in the host organism. The fungus lives best in drier humid conditions, explaining why it is most often found in the soils of Australia, South Africa, and the Southeastern United States.

== Development ==
Similar to other ascomycota, the lifecycle of M. rhizophila is split into two parts: the sexual and asexual stages. The sexual lifestage is characterized by a globose (400-500 um wide) fruit-like body that contains the sexual spores, called a perithecia, which occurs in either singles or multiples. Perithecia are flask-like shaped and contain asci, which are septated, unitunicate stalks of 8 ascospores. The ascospores are biseriate, fusiform, and slightly curved or helical when naive. The perithecia is lined with cells called the peridium and has accessory structures called periphyses and paraphyses that surround the outside and inside of the structure, respectively. Paraphyses inside the perithecia dissolve once asci reach maturity. The asexual lifestage is characterized by asexual conidial structures (6-20x2-6 um). Conidiophores are either simple or branched.
Compared to the fruiting bodies of other Magnaporthe species, rhizophila is considered faster growing (0.8 cm/d at 28 °C) with slightly longer and wider conidial cells.
M. rhizophila is homothallic, so it is self-fertile and can mate with similar mating types within its own mycelia.

== Ecology ==
Magnaporthe rhizophila is considered a necrotrophic parasite because it relies on the nutrients and support of other organisms to thrive. It is a heterotroph since it is unequipped to sequester energy on its own, hence its symbiotic behavior. Magnaporthacaea are family-specific soil-borne parasites of Gramineae; rhizophila specifically colonizes the roots of millet.
Spores from M. rhizophila are dispersed by natural manners such as wind, water, and animals. These spores then settle in soil where they grow and mature through asexual life cycles until it is optimal for the hyphae to resume a sexual cycle and a host organism is near. Rhizophila is only root-infecting; however many of its Magnaporthe relatives are both soil and aerial-infecting. The fungus has an appressorium structure which functions to elicit effector hormones to increase host susceptibility (2 clade-specific types of small specific proteins (SSP)). Lignitubers have been considered a response by host cells after infection as a response to fungal invasion. However, rhizophila kills host cells in 5–6 weeks.
M. rhizophila has darkly pigmented hyphae, composing mycelia that has a gray-brown color, darker than species in the rest of its family. It is able to be cultured in vitro and survives on PDA (potato dextrose agar) plates.

== Geographical distribution ==
Magnaporthe rhizophila does not necessarily require much water to survive, localizing in drier humid regions of Australia, South Africa, and the Southeastern United States.

== Genetics ==
From data derived from genetic testing, it was found that M. rhizophila originated in South Africa. Fungal fossils demonstrated that the phyla diverged 31 million years ago from other Sordariomycetes, and the phylogeny diverged 21 million years ago from pezizomycotina.
Magnaporthe species are grouped into three divergent clades; rhizophila is in clade classification D along with M. poae and G. incrustans. Rhizophila belongs to the Magnaporthe family based on its ascospore morphology; however, it has been considered for the Gaeumannomyces because they also produce phialophora-like anamorphs instead of sympodial pyricularia. M. rhizophila is the only known Magnaporthe species with a phialophora anamorph. Given these similarities between families, M. rhizophila is highly hybridized with other species among these groups.
The M. rhizophila genome is composed of 5.8% transposable elements, lower than other species in its family.
