= Gaeumannomyces graminis var. avenae =

Scientific classification
- Domain: Eukaryota
- Kingdom: Fungi
- Division: Ascomycota
- Class: Sordariomycetes
- Order: Magnaporthales
- Family: Magnaporthaceae
- Genus: Gaeumannomyces
- Species: G. graminis
- Variety: G. g. var. avenae

Trinomial name
- Gaeumannomyces graminis var. avenae (E.M. Turner) Dennis, (1960)

Fungal plant pathogen

Gaeumannomyces graminis var. avenae is a plant pathogen.
