= Muraeriata =

Scientific classification
- Kingdom: Fungi
- Division: Ascomycota
- Class: Sordariomycetes
- Order: Magnaporthales
- Family: Magnaporthaceae
- Genus: Muraeriata; Huhndorf, Greif, Mugambi & A.N. Mill. 2008

Species
- Muraeriata africana Muraeriata collapsa

Genus of fungi

Muraeriata is a genus of fungi in the family Magnaporthaceae.
