= Mycoleptodiscus terrestris =

Scientific classification
- Kingdom: Fungi
- Division: Ascomycota
- Class: Sordariomycetes
- Order: Magnaporthales
- Family: Magnaporthaceae
- Genus: Mycoleptodiscus
- Species: M. terrestris

Binomial name
- Mycoleptodiscus terrestris (Gerd.) Ostaz. (1968)

Synonyms
- Leptodiscus terrestris Gerd. (1953)

Species of fungus

Mycoleptodiscus terrestris is a fungal plant pathogen.

== Host and symptoms ==
Mycoleptodiscus terrestris is an ascomycete with a wide host range that includes several types of popular aquatic weeds that have become invasive mainly in the southern states of America, and it has been seen to infect plants all the way up to Minnesota. The pathogen also infects several types of alfalfa and legumes. This disease is known to cause several symptoms in affected hosts including: leaf spot, crowning, and lots of root rot. These symptoms cause major yield loss.

== Importance ==
In America, this pathogen affects a large amount of crops like from legume famlies and alfalfa, but in other areas such as Asia and Australia, it affects a wider range like some lotuses, psium, and fabaceae. It has been studied since the 1970s in order for it to be used as a viable control of aquatic weeds like water milfoil that is invasive in warmer wet regions of America. What has been found is that it can and will infect these pest plants and could be used as a viable control since they cause plant killing symptoms in target plants after being treated with just some hyphae and fungal material in the water.

== Disease cycle ==
The disease cycle of Mycoleptodiscus terrestris is very dependent on it being able to spread its sclerotia. This pathogen mainly overwinters in these structures which then begin to affect the next year's crop in the form of damping off or late germination infection which targets the roots and stem first of the young plants. The sclerotia of this pathogen are so highly developed and sturdy that they are collected as the inoculum in many experiments involving the pathogen, and they are often viable through several different conditions including different levels of moisture and temperature. They can often be collected and dried chemically and they will still be viable for inoculation or study.

== See also ==
- List of soybean diseases
