= Clasterosphaeria =

Scientific classification
- Kingdom: Fungi
- Division: Ascomycota
- Class: Sordariomycetes
- Order: Magnaporthales
- Family: Magnaporthaceae
- Genus: Clasterosphaeria; Sivan. 1984

Species
- Clasterosphaeria cyperi Clasterosphaeria indica

Genus of fungi

Clasterosphaeria is a genus of fungi in the family Magnaporthaceae.
