= Proxipyricularia zingiberis =

Scientific classification
- Kingdom: Fungi
- Division: Ascomycota
- Class: Sordariomycetes
- Order: Magnaporthales
- Family: Pyriculariaceae
- Genus: Proxipyricularia
- Species: P. zingiberis

Binomial name
- Proxipyricularia zingiberis (Y. Nisik.) Klaubauf, M.-H. Lebrun & Crous

Synonyms
- Pyricularia zingiberis Y. Nisik.

Species of fungus

Proxipyricularia zingiberis is a fungus that was originally found in Japan growing on the leaves of ginger plants, Zingiber mioga and Zingiber officinale, in 1917, when it was described as Pyricularia zingiberis. P. zingiberis is a member of plant pathogenic fungi that predominantly affect monocotyledon plants, including ginger. Ginger is a valuable tropical crop used for spices, medicinal purposes, and consumption across the world, making P. zingiberis a concerning pathogenic agent.

Pyricularia zingiberis was reclassified using advanced molecular techniques in 2014 as Proxipyricularia zingiberis, which is an evolutionary lineage that is genetically distinct from its previous classification, though morphologically similar. This distinction was made in an effort to resolve the polyphyletic nature of the genus Pyricularia after molecular phylogenetic analysis.

== Morphologic description and symptoms ==
P. zingiberis is a causal agent of leaf spot and blast disease. Leaf spots appear as small brown lesions on living ginger leaves that are diamond-shaped. Symptoms predominate on leaves but can spread down the stem as symptoms progress. Scattered leaf spots bear sclerotium-like structures and can congregate into large blotches and progress into blast symptoms that can be lethal to the plant. The blast symptoms of the disease have resulted in significant yield losses to ginger growers.

In culture, hyphal growth varies in coloration from hyaline to green-gray, often described as olivaceous. Conidiophores are polyblastic, unbranched to slightly branched in shape, and up to 350 μm in size. Conidiophores can be solitary or bundled to enhance spore production and dispersal and can be either intercalary or terminal.

Conidia are pyriform and hyaline to pale brown, sporting 1-2 septations. P. zingiberis conidia range from 14 to 24.5 μm in length and 5.0 to 9.0 μm in width. For a visual depiction of the symptoms and microscopic structures of P. zingiberis, refer to this image here.

== Pathogenicity ==
The pathogen has a polycyclic disease cycle and is dispersed through the air. Under favorable conditions, conidia on the leaf surface grow a germ tube that forms into an appressorium and penetrates the leaf cuticle using turgor pressure. Necrotic lesions form along the leaf surface as hyphae spread throughout cells within host tissues until lesions with spores emerge on the leaf surface for dispersal.

== Ecology and distribution ==
P. zingiberis is a plant pathogen on Zingiber hosts. Species of Pyricularia have been identified as endophytes living in ginger leaf tissue.

P. zingiberis is found in tropical climates with high humidity, which promotes infection. Environmental conditions largely influence disease development, so cultural practices have been used to aid in mitigating infection. Currently, P. zingiberis has been identified in Japan, Indonesia, Vietnam, and Malaysia. Primary pathogen management relies on chemical fungicides to slow or suppress the pathogen. In some Pyricularia species, resistant host cultivars have been developed to control disease, but ultimately have not been successful due to genetic diversity and adaptations in the fungal genome. Breeding resistance in ginger plants has not been noted as a primary management tactic for P. zingiberis. Currently, Z. mioga and Z. officinale are both susceptible.
