= Harpophora maydis =

Scientific classification
- Domain: Eukaryota
- Kingdom: Fungi
- Division: Ascomycota
- Class: Sordariomycetes
- Order: Magnaporthales
- Family: Magnaporthaceae
- Genus: Harpophora
- Species: H. maydis

Binomial name
- Harpophora maydis (W. Gams, 2000)

Synonyms
- Cephalosporium maydis Acremonium maydis Maganaporthaceae maydis

Species of fungus

Harpophora maydis, also known by late wilt, the vascular maize disease it causes, is a species of fungus in the family Magnaporthaceae.

== Taxonomy ==
Discovered in Egypt in 1960, the species was first described as Cephalosporium maydis (Samra, Sabet and Hingoran. 1962). Acremonium maydis, likely a result of misidentification, is often mischaracterised as the same species and as a result the name functions as a synonym for H. maydis. One reason for this is likely the similarities between H. maydis and other Cephalosporium species such as C. acremonium

In 2000, Walter Gams created the genus Harpophora for a number of species in Cephalosporium that are morphologically phialophora-like, based upon Harpophora radiciola. As a result, many species of Cephalosporium, including C. maydis were moved there.

== Distribution ==
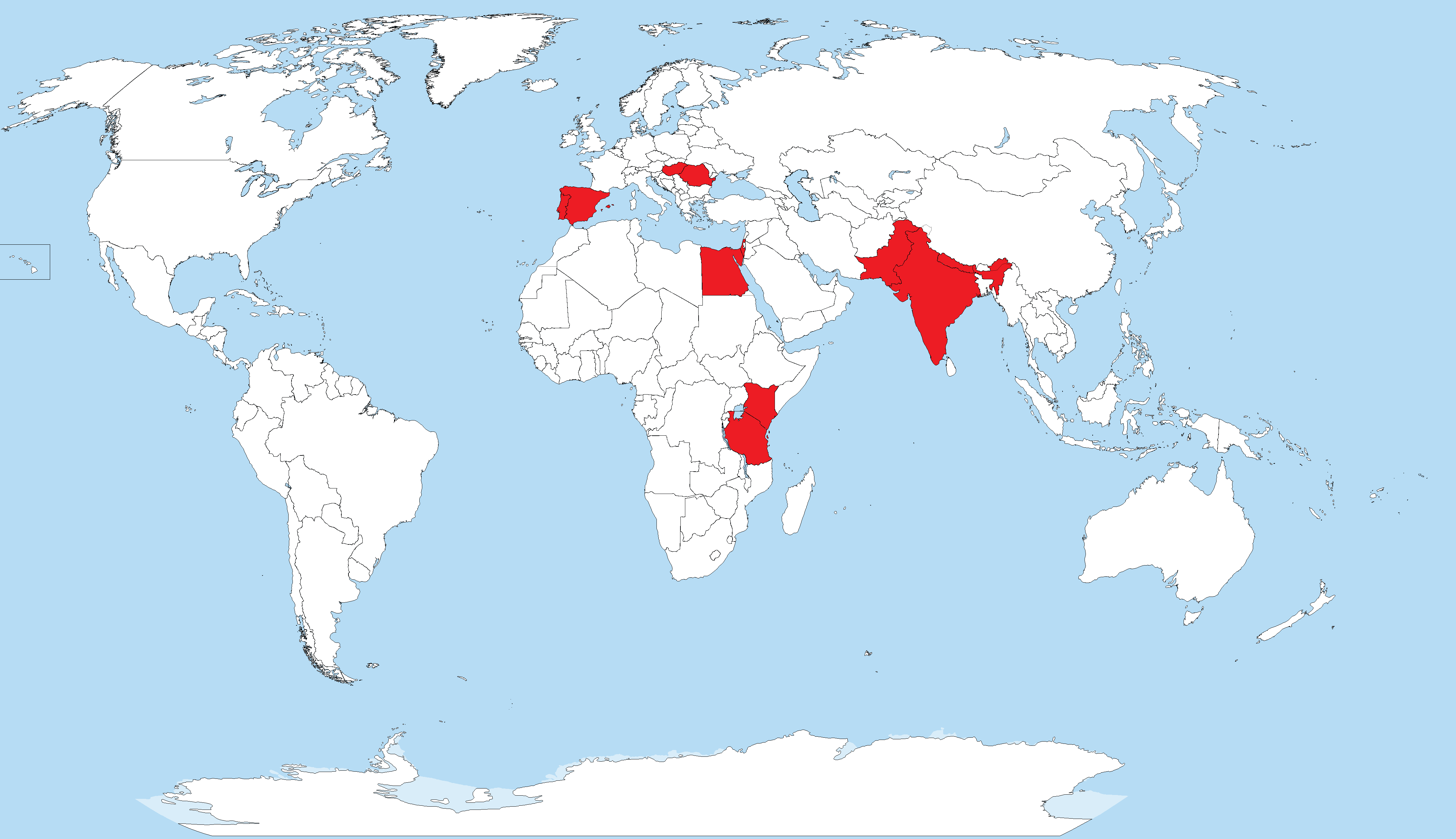
States where Harpophora maydis is present

H. maydis was initially discovered in Egypt in 1960 and has since been reported in approximately 10 other states.

The species is widespread on the Indian subcontinent, present in India, Pakistan, and Nepal. Reported first in India, originally in Andhra Pradesh and then later in Rajasthan and Punjab. Within Pakistan, it has been present in the Punjab province since at least 1989.

In Europe, the fungus is present in both Spain and Portugal as well as Hungary and Romania.

Its presence has been especially problematic in Israel since the early 2010s, where especially aggressive strains have been found.
