= Deightoniella =

Scientific classification
- Kingdom: Fungi
- Division: Ascomycota
- Class: Sordariomycetes
- Order: Magnaporthales
- Family: Magnaporthaceae
- Genus: Deightoniella; S.Hughes

Genus of fungi

Deightoniella is a genus of fungi belonging to the family Magnaporthaceae. It contains 14 species.

The species of this genus are found in Europe.

The genus name of Deightoniella is in honour of Frederick Claude Deighton (1903 - 1992), British botanist (mycology) and plant pathologist.

The genus was circumscribed by Stanley John Hughes in Mycol. Pap. Vol.48 on page 27 in 1952.

== Species ==
Species:

- Deightoniella africana S. Hughes
- Deightoniella alni Ondřej
- Deightoniella arecae W.Q. Chen
- Deightoniella argemonensis Pollack & D. Matthews
- Deightoniella bhopalensis Satya
- Deightoniella caricina (Bres.) Ondřej
- Deightoniella fimbristylidis Sawada ex M.B. Ellis
- Deightoniella ichnanthi M.B. Ellis
- Deightoniella jabalpurensis G.P. Agarwal & Hasija
- Deightoniella leonensis M.B. Ellis
- Deightoniella mayeei Manohar., Kunwar, N.K. Rao & D.K. Agarwal
- Deightoniella papuana D.E. Shaw
- Deightoniella rosariensis Mercado
- Deightoniella rugosa F.R. Barbosa, Gusmão & R.F. Castañeda
