= Gibellina (fungus) =

Scientific classification
- Domain: Eukaryota
- Kingdom: Fungi
- Division: Ascomycota
- Class: Sordariomycetes
- Order: Magnaporthales
- Family: Magnaporthaceae
- Genus: Gibellina; Pass. 1886

Type species
- Gibellina cerealis (Pass.) Pass.

Species
- G. cerealis G. rehmiana

Genus of fungi

Gibellina is a genus of fungi in the family Magnaporthaceae, from Italy.

The genus name of Gibellia is in honour of Giuseppe Gibelli (1831 – 1898), who was an Italian botanist and lichenologist who was a native of Santa Cristina e Bissone.

The genus was circumscribed by Giovanni Passerini in Revue Mycol. Toulouse Vol.8 on page 177 in 1886.
