= Mycoleptodiscus =

Scientific classification
- Domain: Eukaryota
- Kingdom: Fungi
- Division: Ascomycota
- Class: Sordariomycetes
- Order: Magnaporthales
- Family: Magnaporthaceae
- Genus: Mycoleptodiscus; Ostaz. (1968)

Species
- See text

Genus of fungi

Mycoleptodiscus is a genus of fungi in the family Magnaporthaceae. These fungi are endophytic, meaning that they do not harm the host plant and are probably in a mutualistic relationship with it.

== Species ==
- Mycoleptodiscus affinis
- Mycoleptodiscus atromaculans
- Mycoleptodiscus brasiliensis
- Mycoleptodiscus coloratus
- Mycoleptodiscus disciformis
- Mycoleptodiscus geniculatus
- Mycoleptodiscus indicus
- Mycoleptodiscus lateralis
- Mycoleptodiscus lunatus
- Mycoleptodiscus minimus
- Mycoleptodiscus sphaericus
- Mycoleptodiscus stellatisporus
- Mycoleptodiscus taiwanensis
- Mycoleptodiscus terrestris
- Mycoleptodiscus unilateralis
- Mycoleptodiscus variabilis
