= Pyriculariaceae =

- Macgarvieomyces juncicola

Scientific classification
- Kingdom: Fungi
- Division: Ascomycota
- Class: Sordariomycetes
- Order: Magnaporthales
- Family: Pyriculariaceae; S. Klaubauf, M.H. Lebrun & P.W. Crous (2014)

Genera
- See text

Family of fungi

The Pyriculariaceae are a family of ascomycete fungi in the order Magnaporthales. It was introduced by S. Klaubauf, M.H. Lebrun & P.W. Crous in 2014.

== Taxonomy ==
Type genus: Pyricularia Sacc. 1880

Type species: Pyricularia grisea Sacc. 1880

The polyphyletic nature of Pyricularia has been resolved in 2014 leading to the definition of a new family, the Pyriculariaceae. Phylogenetic analysis showed that three clear clades could be distinguished. One clade corresponds to Magnaporthaceae (based on Nakataea), and two other clades were defined as new families: Pyriculariaceae (based on Pyricularia), and Ophioceraceae (based on Ophioceras).

== Description ==
The Pyriculariaceae that reproduce sexually form perithecial fruiting bodies (ascomata), which are immersed, black and with long cylindrical necks covered in setae. Asci are subcylindrical, unitunicate, short-stipitate and with a large apical ring staining in Meltzer's iodine reagent. Ascospores are septate and fusiform.

Asexual morphs are hyphomycetes with simple, branched conidiophores. Asexual spores (conidia) are hyaline to brown in colour with transverse septa. The typical pyriform shape and 2-septate conidium morphology is characteristic for Pyricularia and Neopyricularia. Other genera have obclavate to more ellipsoid 2-septate conidia. Deightoniella and Macgarvieomyces evolved 1-septate conidia.

An identification key to genera of Pyriculariaceae is provided by Maharachchikumbura et al (2016).

=== Differentiation from other families ===
Pyriculariaceae is distinguished from Magnaporthaceae by their asexual morphs. Pyricularia or pyricularia-like species are characterised by pyriform 2-septate conidia and rhexolytic secession. In the case of Magnaporthaceae, morphology of phialophora- or harpophora-like species is characterised by falcate versicoloured conidia on brown, erect conidiophores.

== Genera ==
- Bambusicularia
- Barretomyces
- Macgarvieomyces
- Neocordana
- Neopyricularia
- Proxipyricularia
- Pseudopyricularia
- Pyricularia
- Xenopyricularia

== Ecology ==
Pyriculariaceae are saprobic or plant pathogenic fungi on various plant hosts, commonly on monocots. Their host spectrum includes many grasses (Poaceae), and also ginger, sedges, rushes and commelina.

Blast diseases by Pyriculariaceae are caused by use of an appressorium to penetrate the host.

=== Economic significance ===
Species of Pyriculariaceae cause major diseases on grasses, among which Pyricularia oryzae (sexual morph Magnaporthe oryzae) is responsible for the devastating disease of rice (rice blast). P. oryzae can also infect other host plants, such as Eleusine, Oryza, Setaria or Triticum. Other Pyricularia species can infect Cenchrus, Echinochloa, Lolium, Pennisetum or Zingiber.
