= Deightoniella papuana =

Scientific classification
- Kingdom: Fungi
- Division: Ascomycota
- Class: Sordariomycetes
- Order: Magnaporthales
- Family: Magnaporthaceae
- Genus: Deightoniella
- Species: D. papuana

Binomial name
- Deightoniella papuana D.E. Shaw, (1959)

Species of fungus

Deightoniella papuana is an ascomycete fungus that is a plant pathogen.
