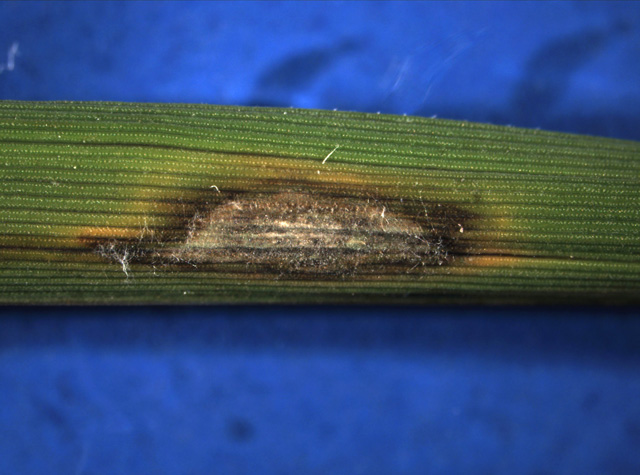
- A typical eye-shaped lesion of rice blast disease on the 'Katy' rice cultivar inoculated with Magnaporthe grisea

Scientific classification
- Domain: Eukaryota
- Kingdom: Fungi
- Division: Ascomycota
- Class: Sordariomycetes
- Order: Magnaporthales
- Family: Magnaporthaceae
- Genus: Magnaporthe; R.A.Krause & R.K.Webster (1972)

Type species
- Magnaporthe salvinii (Catt.) R.A.Krause & R.K.Webster (1972)

Species
- M. grisea M. oryzae M. poae M. rhizophila M. salvinii

= Magnaporthe =

Genus of fungi

Magnaporthe is a genus of ascomycete fungi. Several of the species are cereal pathogens. There are five species in the widespread genus.
