= Pseudohalonectria =

Scientific classification
- Kingdom: Fungi
- Division: Ascomycota
- Class: Sordariomycetes
- Order: Magnaporthales
- Family: Magnaporthaceae
- Genus: Pseudohalonectria; Minoura & T. Muroi 1978

Species
- See text.

Genus of fungi

Pseudohalonectria is a genus of fungi in the family Magnaporthaceae.

== Species ==
- Pseudohalonectria adversaria
- Pseudohalonectria aomoriensis
- Pseudohalonectria eubenangeensis
- Pseudohalonectria falcata
- Pseudohalonectria fuxianii
- Pseudohalonectria halophila
- Pseudohalonectria lignicola
- Pseudohalonectria longirostrum
- Pseudohalonectria lutea
- Pseudohalonectria miscanthicola
- Pseudohalonectria palmicola
- Pseudohalonectria phialidica
- Pseudohalonectria suthepensis
- Pseudohalonectria tayloriae
