= Ceratosphaerella =

Scientific classification
- Kingdom: Fungi
- Division: Ascomycota
- Class: Sordariomycetes
- Order: Magnaporthales
- Family: Magnaporthaceae
- Genus: Ceratosphaerella; Huhndorf, Greif, Mugambi & A.N. Mill. 2008

Species
- Ceratosphaerella castillensis Ceratosphaerella rhizomorpha

Genus of fungi

Ceratosphaerella is a genus of fungi in the family Magnaporthaceae.
