= Gibellina cerealis =

Scientific classification
- Kingdom: Fungi
- Division: Ascomycota
- Class: Sordariomycetes
- Order: Magnaporthales
- Family: Magnaporthaceae
- Genus: Gibellina
- Species: G. cerealis

Binomial name
- Gibellina cerealis (Pass.) Pass., (1886)

Synonyms
- Gibellia cerealis Pass., (1886)

Species of fungus

Gibellina cerealis is a fungal plant pathogen. It is a pathogen of wheat and similar species, causing white foot rot or basal stem rot. Co-infection with Rhizoctonia solani can occur.
