= Tryptophan dehydrogenase =

Enzyme

tryptophan dehydrogenase

Identifiers
- EC no.: 1.4.1.19
- CAS no.: 94047-13-9

Databases
- IntEnz: IntEnz view
- BRENDA: BRENDA entry
- ExPASy: NiceZyme view
- KEGG: KEGG entry
- MetaCyc: metabolic pathway
- PRIAM: profile
- PDB structures: RCSB PDB PDBe PDBsum
- Gene Ontology: AmiGO / QuickGO
Search
- PMC: articles
- PubMed: articles
- NCBI: proteins

In enzymology, tryptophan dehydrogenase (EC 1.4.1.19) is an enzyme that catalyzes the chemical reaction

tryptophan
+ NAD^{+}
H_{2}O
H^{+}
H_{2}O
H^{+}
indole-3-pyruvic acid
+ NADH + NH_{3}

The three substrates of this enzyme are L-tryptophan, oxidised nicotinamide adenine dinucleotide (NAD^{+}), and water. Its products are indole-3-pyruvic acid, ammonia, reduced NADH, and a proton. Nicotinamide adenine dinucleotide phosphate can be used as an alternative cofactor.

This enzyme belongs to the family of oxidoreductases, specifically those acting on the CH-NH_{2} group of donors with NAD^{+} or NADP^{+} as acceptor. The systematic name of this enzyme class is L-tryptophan:NAD(P)+ oxidoreductase (deaminating). Other names in common use include NAD(P)^{+}-L-tryptophan dehydrogenase, L-tryptophan dehydrogenase, L-Trp-dehydrogenase, and TDH. This enzyme has at least one effector, calcium.
