= Seed blanking =

Lack of seed production in plants

Seed blanking is a plant disease injury causing the seed producing anatomy to contain no seeds despite otherwise normal development. This term is used to contrast with other causes of seed production failure, including but not limited to earlier or more widespread damage to the plant. For example, wheat blast causes widespread seed blanking.
