= Magnaporthe poae =

Scientific classification
- Kingdom: Fungi
- Division: Ascomycota
- Class: Sordariomycetes
- Order: Magnaporthales
- Family: Magnaporthaceae
- Genus: Magnaporthe
- Species: M. poae

Binomial name
- Magnaporthe poae Landschoot & N.Jackson (1989)

Species of fungus

Magnaporthe poae is an ascomycete fungus which causes the turfgrass disease commonly known as summer patch, or Poa patch. The disease occurs mostly on Kentucky bluegrass (Poa pratensis), Fescues (Festuca sp.), and on Annual bluegrass (Poa annua). Bentgrass (Agrostis sp.) may also become infected but shows very few symptoms and quickly recovers. Summer Patch will usually become noticeable between June and September, although small signs can appear at any time but are not noticeable because the turfgrass can recover quickly.

== Symptoms ==
Symptoms of summer patch appear very similar to necrotic ring spot. This makes it very difficult to identify; if correct diagnosis is critical contact a local cooperative extension program or a qualified commercial lab. Although it is difficult to identify alone, if one takes into account grass species and cultural practices a trained eye can diagnose summer patch. Summer patch will appear as irregular patches, rings (less than 10 inches in diameter), and crescents. The "frog eye" appearance is often from the Poa annua being killed by the fungus while the middle living grass is Bentgrass. On lower cut turf, typically lower than 1.4 inches, summer patch is much easier to identify. A tug test can be performed and look for blackened roots. Yellowing and decline is often found on Poa annua in a mixed bentgrass area.

== Disease cycle ==
Summer patch is usually caused by an interaction of environmental factors (stress) and a root or crown rot caused by Magnaporthe poae. The fungus Magnaporthe poae is consistently found in grass roots but does not become noticeable until conditions are favorable. Favorable conditions include extended periods of humid weather and daytime high temperatures usually (greater than 82 °F) in midsummer. Other causes include: poor air circulation, high soil moisture (sometimes caused by frequent irrigation), soil compaction (heavy traffic), and poor drainage. The disease does not appear noticeable during the cool weather of spring and fall. Summer patch seems to favor soil with a pH higher than 6.

== Cultural control ==
The best way to prevent and minimize summer patch damage is by using disease-resistant turfgrass species/cultivars. To find these new cultivars one can visit turfgrass seed distributors, extension specialists, or visit the National Turfgrass Evaluation Program website at: http://www.ntep.org. If incorporating disease resistant varieties of turfgrass is not an option, then focus on better management practices. These practices should help promote adequate drainage, reduce soil compaction, and a balanced fertility program. Install an internal drainage system if you have severe drainage problems. An adequate aeration program will relieve compaction and improve drainage. Aeration should annually disrupt between 15–20% of the total surface area. Avoid using quick-release fertilizers; try using slow-release ammonium sources. If the soil pH is above 6, then use ammonium sulfate, which will acidify the soil. Turfgrass has been shown to be most resistant to summer patch when soil pH is between 5.5 and 6. Most balanced fertility programs for Kentucky Bluegrass lawns will consist of applying two to five lbs of nitrogen/1000 sq.ft. a year. Promote root growth by watering heavy and infrequently. Since low mowing heights are conducive to shallow rooting, raising the height of cut can possibly result in less summer patch injury.

== Chemical control ==
If severe enough or on high valued turf (golf greens) summer patch can be controlled with the use of fungicides. Applications are made on a preventive basis and usually applied 3–4 weeks before symptoms appear. High water amounts should be used, about 5–10 gallons per 1,000 sq ft (93 m^{2}).

Effective fungicides include:

- Benzimidazoles: Cleary 3336, Fungo 50, T Storm
- DMIs: Banner, Bayleton, Eagle, Rubigan, Lynx, Spectator, Trinity
- Strobilurins: Compass, Disarm, Heritage, Insignia
