= Plant-growth promoting fungi =

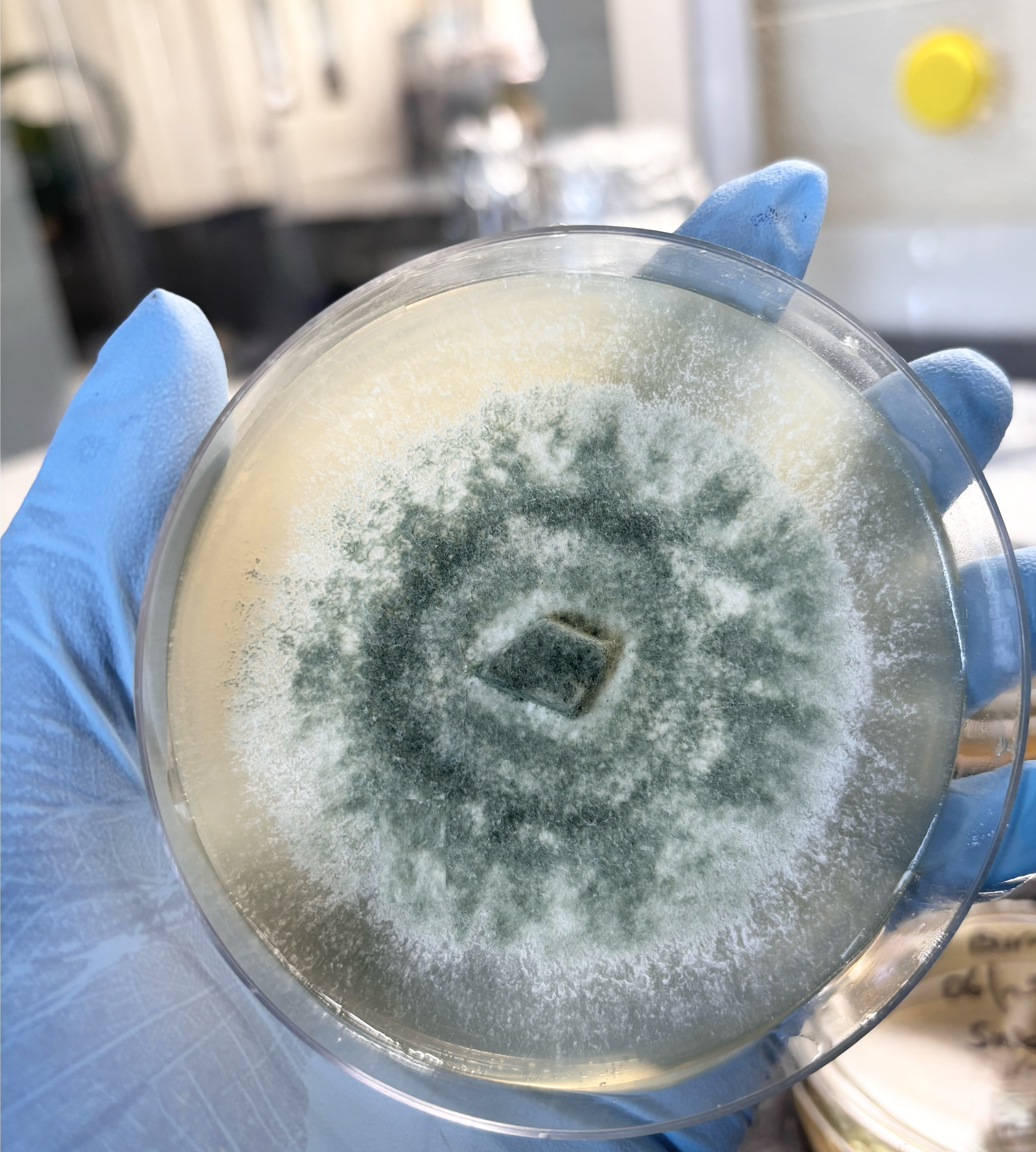
A strain of Trichoderma fungi, one common studied plant-growth promoting fungi

Plant-growth promoting fungi (PGPF) are a diverse and heterogeneous group of non-pathogenic, filamentous, soil-borne fungi that colonize plant roots, particularly in the rhizosphere, and have a positive or mutualistic effect on plant health and development. PGPF, like their bacterial counterparts (PGPR - Plant Growth-Promoting Rhizobacteria), are a key component of the plant microbiome. Despite the name, not all fungi that promote plant growth are considered PGPF (e.g. mychorrhizal fungi).

== Significance and diversity ==
PGPF are studied for their beneficial effects, which include enhancing crop yield and mitigating both biotic and abiotic stress as instances. The mechanisms employed by PGPF are often conserved and can function across a broad range of host plants. PGPF primarily belongs to the phylum Ascomycota, and a few of them belong to Basidiomycota and Zygomycota.

== Mechanism of action ==
PGPF promote plant growth and protect against pathogens through a combination of direct and indirect mechanisms. Direct mechanisms involve the production of chemical compounds that directly influence plant metabolism, morphology, or nutrition. Indirect mechanisms primarily involve protecting the plant by suppressing the growth of harmful soil microorganisms.

=== Direct ===
The production of auxin (IAA) by fungi is a key component of their colonization strategy and promotion of root system architecture. Trichoderma virens, for instance, produces IAA, indole-3-acetaldehyde (IAAld), and indole-3-ethanol (IEt). IAAld, an IAA precursor, is recognized as an active auxin that promotes growth and is involved in the root's auxin-mediated signaling pathways. Fungal IAA affects the roots more significantly than the shoots and may also circumvent the plant's basal defense mechanisms. Cytokinin signaling, often working antagonistically with auxins, regulates shoot and root architecture. PGPF also enhance the bioavailability and uptake of essential plant nutrients, as phosphorus solubilization is facilitated by the production of organic acids by PGPF and can be a component of their plant-growth promoting (PGP) effect. For micronutrients, they promote the utilization of decomposing organic matter through mineral solubilization and sequestering ferric ions via siderophores. Some PGPF species, like those in the genus Trichoderma, have the capacity for bioremediation of environmental pollutants, including heavy metals, organometallic compounds, and agrochemicals.

=== Indirect ===
Includes the production of inhibitory compounds (antibiotics), parasitism of pathogenic fungi (mycoparasitism), and competition for nutrients and colonization sites in the rhizosphere. A core indirect mechanism is the elicitation of Induced Systemic Resistance (ISR) in the host plant. ISR activates systemic plant defenses against a broad spectrum of pathogens, reducing the severity of diseases. This often involves the priming or activation of plant defense genes, mediated by signaling molecules such as jasmonic acid (JA) and ethylene (ET), and sometimes salicylic acid (SA). Some PGPF, like Trichoderma koningi, establish a symbiotic-like relationship by suppressing the plant's defense mechanisms, such as the biosynthesis of isoflavonoid phytoalexins (e.g., vestitol in Lotus japonicus). This strategy is similar to that of arbuscular mycorrhizal fungi (AMF) and is crucial for successful long-term colonization. Certain PGPF strains, including species of Fusarium and Trichoderma, produce volatile organic compounds (VOCs) that act as signals for plant-microbe communication that could directly enhance shoot growth, leaf area, and lateral root growth, often by affecting auxin signaling in the plant.
