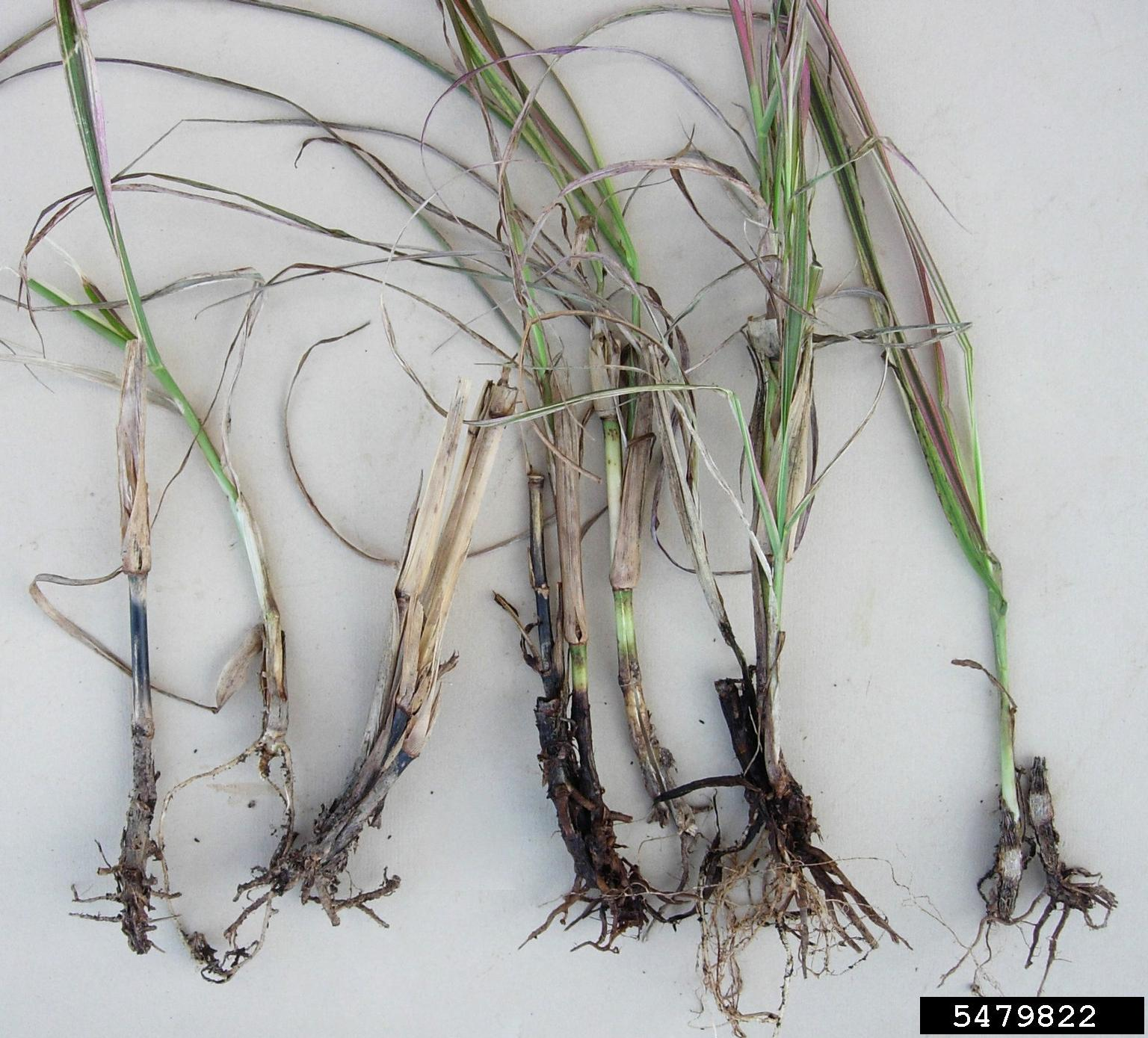

Scientific classification
- Kingdom: Fungi
- Division: Ascomycota
- Class: Sordariomycetes
- Order: Magnaporthales
- Family: Magnaporthaceae
- Genus: Gaeumannomyces
- Species: G. graminis (Sacc.) Arx & D.L. Olivier, (1952)
- Variety: G. g. var. graminis

Trinomial name
- Gaeumannomyces graminis var. graminis

Synonyms
- Gaeumannomyces cariceti Gaeumannomyces graminis Gaeumannomyces oryzinus Linocarpon cariceti Linocarpon oryzinum Ophiobolus cariceti Ophiobolus graminis Ophiobolus graminis var. graminis Ophiobolus oryzinus Ophiobolus oryzinus Rhaphidophora graminis Rhaphidospora cariceti Sphaeria cariceti

= Gaeumannomyces graminis var. graminis =

Fungal plant pathogen

Gaeumannomyces graminis var. graminis is a plant pathogen. This fungal pathogen produces extensive damage on the sheath of rice, causing black spots which protrude from the infected. This pathogen also generates a discoloration in the foliage of a plant which tends to show a straw orange colouration.
