= Herbampulla =

Scientific classification
- Kingdom: Fungi
- Division: Ascomycota
- Class: Sordariomycetes
- Order: Magnaporthales
- Family: Magnaporthaceae
- Genus: Herbampulla; Scheuer & Nograsek 1993
- Species: H. crassirostris

Binomial name
- Herbampulla crassirostris Scheuer & Nograsek 1993

Genus of fungi

Herbampulla is a monotypic genus of fungi in the family Magnaporthaceae containing the sole species Herbampulla crassirostris.
