= Omnidemptus =

Scientific classification
- Kingdom: Fungi
- Division: Ascomycota
- Class: Sordariomycetes
- Order: Magnaporthales
- Family: Magnaporthaceae
- Genus: Omnidemptus; P.F. Cannon & Alcorn 1994
- Species: O. affinis

Binomial name
- Omnidemptus affinis P.F. Cannon & Alcorn 1994

Genus of fungi

Omnidemptus is a monotypic genus of fungi in the family Magnaporthaceae containing the sole species Omnidemptus affinis.
