= Buergenerula =

Scientific classification
- Kingdom: Fungi
- Division: Ascomycota
- Class: Sordariomycetes
- Order: Magnaporthales
- Family: Magnaporthaceae
- Genus: Buergenerula; Syd. 1936

Species
- Buergenerula biseptata Buergenerula caricis Buergenerula spartinae Buergenerula typhae Buergenerula zelandica

Synonyms
- Yukonia

Genus of fungi

Buergenerula is a genus of fungi in the family Magnaporthaceae.
