= 11-cis-retinyl-palmitate hydrolase =

Class of enzymes

Identifiers
- EC no.: 3.1.1.63

Databases
- IntEnz: IntEnz view
- BRENDA: BRENDA entry
- ExPASy: NiceZyme view
- KEGG: KEGG entry
- MetaCyc: metabolic pathway
- PRIAM: profile
- PDB structures: RCSB PDB PDBe PDBsum
- Gene Ontology: AmiGO / QuickGO
Search
- PMC: articles
- PubMed: articles
- NCBI: proteins

The enzyme 11-cis-retinyl-palmitate hydrolase (EC 3.1.1.63) catalyzes the reaction

11-cis-retinyl palmitate + H_{2}O $\rightleftharpoons$ 11-cis-retinol + palmitate

This enzyme belongs to the family of hydrolases, specifically those acting on carboxylic ester bonds. The systematic name is 11-cis-retinyl-palmitate acylhydrolase. Other names in common use include 11-cis-retinol palmitate esterase, and RPH. This enzyme participates in retinol metabolism. This enzyme has at least one effector, Bile salt.
