= Magnaporthe salvinii =

Scientific classification
- Kingdom: Fungi
- Division: Ascomycota
- Class: Sordariomycetes
- Order: Magnaporthales
- Family: Magnaporthaceae
- Genus: Magnaporthe
- Species: M. salvinii

Binomial name
- Magnaporthe salvinii (Catt.) R.A. Krause & R.K. Webster, (1972)

Synonyms
- Curvularia irregularis (Cralley & Tullis) Hara, (1959); Curvularia sigmoidea (Cavara) Hara, (1959); Helminthosporium sigmoideum Cavara, (1889); Helminthosporium sigmoideum var. irregulare Cralley & Tullis, (1935); Leptosphaeria salvinii Catt., (1879); Nakataea sigmoidea (Cavara) Hara, (1939); Phragmoporthe salvinii (Catt.) M. Monod, (1983); Sclerotium oryzae Catt., (1879); Vakrabeeja sigmoidea (Cavara) Subram., (1957); Vakrabeeja sigmoidea var. irregularis (Cralley & Tullis) Shoemaker [as 'irregulare'], (1959)

Species of fungus

Magnaporthe salvinii is a fungus known to attack a variety of grass and rice species, including Oryza sativa (Asian rice) and Zizania aquatica (wild rice). Symptoms of fungal infection in plants include small, black, lesions on the leaves that develop into more widespread leaf rot, which then spreads to the stem and causes breakage. As part of its life cycle, the fungus produces sclerotia that persist in dead plant tissue and the soil. Management of the fungus may be effected by tilling the soil, reducing its nitrogen content, or by open field burning, all of which reduce the number of sclerotia, or by the application of a fungicide.

== Hosts and symptoms ==
Magnaporthe salvinii (teleomorph), also known as Sclerotium oryzae (anamorph) and Nakataea sigmoidae (anamorph), is an ascomycete fungal pathogen that affects several rice and grass species, including:

Echinochloa colona, jungle rice

Oryza sativa, common rice

Zizania aquatica, annual wild rice

Zizaniopsis miliacea, giant cutgrass

various turf grasses

The first symptom that typically appears is a small, black, irregular lesion on the leaf sheath. Next, the lesion grows and penetrates the inner sheath until the leaf sheath becomes partially or totally rotted. The culm of the plant then shows black or brown discoloration and begins to shrivel. When the plant reaches maturity, the stem breaks due to the weakened, rotted stem. Sclerotia may be seen developing within the dead tissue of the rotted stem.

== Disease cycle ==
Magnaporthe salvinii is an ascomycete fungus that infects a plant in a polycyclic manner, through conidia that are teardrop-shaped. Once a conidium lands on a leaf, it sticks to the leaf surface and generates a germ tube, appressorium, and penetration peg to bore through the cuticle of the plant. From there, the penetration peg forms a branched feeding structure analogous to haustoria formed in other fungi. As lesions form on the host plant, the pathogen continues to produce conidiophores and conidia that may be dispersed by rain splash to infect more plants. When conditions become unfavorable, the fungus overwinters in sclerotia inside the dead host plant tissue, or within the soil. The sclerotia can be dispersed through soil by rain and water irrigation. Moist, humid conditions, and high nitrogen fertilization are favorable conditions for the sclerotia, which germinate in wet areas of the leaf or sheath. Once the sclerotia germinate, the mycelium infects the plant through wounds or natural openings in the plant. Then the fungus produces conidia and repeats its life cycle.

== Management ==
One form of control for this pathogen is tilling the field to reduce the number of sclerotia. Maximum tilling of the field significantly reduces the viability of the sclerotia in the soil compared to minimum and no tillage. Another useful method of eliminating sclerotia in soil is by open field burning; however, overuse of this method in some areas requires additional practical interventions. Other forms of management to reduce the number of sclerotia are swathing and fall incorporation with winter flooding. Additionally, restricting the amount of nitrogen fertilizer added to the soil will reduce germination of sclerotia, since they favor high nitrogen soil. Lastly, an important means of control of this fungal pathogen is the use of fungicide. Quadris is one specific commercial fungicide that is capable of killing Magnaporthe salvinii.
