= Mary Dilys Glynne =

British plant pathologist and mountaineer

- Born: 19 February 1895; Bangor, Gwynedd, Wales
- Died: 9 May 1991 (aged 96); Harpenden, Hertfordshire, England
- Scientific career
- Fields: Plant pathology, mycology
- Institutions: Rothamsted Experimental Station

Mary Dilys Glynne OBE (19 February 1895 – 9 May 1991) was a British plant pathologist and mountaineer.

She was the first plant pathologist at Rothamsted Experimental Station and was particularly interested in soil-based fungal diseases including potato wart, eyespot in wheat and take-all. She discovered a method for identifying varieties of crop resistant to these fungal diseases and proved that methods such as crop rotation only perpetuated the problem. Her research led to increased yields in agriculture, which was of particular note during World War II, and was appointed an OBE for her services to agriculture.

Glynne was also a passionate mountaineer, climbing a number of famous Alpine peaks. She was the second person, the first woman, to climb Mount Spencer in New Zealand.

== Early life ==
Glynne was born Mary Dilys Glynne Jones in Upper Bangor, Gwynedd in North Wales on 19 February 1895. Her father, John Glynne Jones, was a solicitor and her mother, Dilys Lloyd Glynne Jones was secretary (and later vice-president) of the Association for Promoting the Education of Girls in Wales. The couple had a total of five children. Glynne, as the middle child, had both an older and younger brother and sister. Glynne's elder sister was Eryl Smith, a doctor and plant collector. Glynne's mother was one of the founders of the Bangor School for Girls, so Glynne was educated there before attending North London Collegiate School, another school with links to her mother. Her degree in botany was attained from University College of North Wales in 1917 and soon after she dropped the "Jones" from her name.

== Plant pathology ==
As soon as Glynne graduated she was offered a post in the University College of North Wales department of agriculture, but within a few months she was volunteering at Rothamsted Experimental Station where E. John Russell was director. Winifred Brenchley, the first woman to work in agricultural sciences, soon offered her a permanent assistant botanist position at Rothamsted, where she remained for 43 years. Glynne was one of the original members of the Mycology Department in 1918 and later founded the Plant Pathology Department. Glynne's first major work was studying Synchytrium endobioticum, the cause of potato wart disease. A modified version of her method for identifying varieties resistant to the disease, the Glynne-Lemmerzahl method, is still in use today. The work was sufficiently notable that the University of Wales awarded Glynne an MSc degree in 1922 for her achievements.

Glynne was the British winner of the Dr. Georgina Sweet fellowship in 1927, awarded at the Vienna conference of International Federation of University Women. The award included a year's study in Australia, Tasmania and New Zealand, which she undertook in 1928 after spending time with Sweet. Whilst there, she worked at the University of Melbourne and toured the country with the Department of Agriculture to promote better farming techniques. As part of her return journey, she visited a number of African countries, learning about the agricultural difficulties they faced. Whilst in South Africa, she attended the 1929 meeting of the British Association.

By the 1930s, Glynne's focus was on cereal diseases, especially soil-borne varieties. She was able to prove that the lodging or flattening of wheat close to harvest was frequently not the result of wind or rain, but instead caused by take-all and eyespot, both soil-borne fungal diseases. Glynne was able to not only identify the fungal cause and which strains of cereal were less susceptible, but also establish that crop rotation exacerbated the issue. On this basis, she was able to advise which strains of cereal should be planted in the affected fields. Glynne also discovered Gibellina cerealis in 1935, a fungal pathogen thought to be introduced to the UK by Roman settlers.

Glynne's work on crop diseases was subject to significant attention towards the end of World War II, as maximising the production of food was essential due to shortages. Her work, especially on eyespot in wheat, afforded her a DSc degree from University of Wales in 1943. In both the 1940s and 1950s, she carried on her pioneering work in cereal pathology and made "unexpected" discoveries related to the disposal of organic material in the soil.

== Other interests ==
One of Glynne's main interests was mountaineering and rock climbing, although her family did not support the hobby, as her mother's cousin, Owen Glynne Jones, died at the age of 32 in a climbing accident on Dent Blanche. Despite this, Glynne climbed throughout her life, including in Australia and New Zealand whilst she was touring there. She recorded the second ever ascent of Mount Spencer in New Zealand, (Note: Mount Spencer is a peak of 2788 metres in New Zealand's Southern Alps at 43.524°S 170.221°E. This should not be confused with a lesser Mount Spencer which is 12.5 kilometres north in the Burster Range at 43.414°S 170.256°E.) the first by a woman. When she returned to Europe, she climbed major Alpine peaks such as Matterhorn, Mont Blanc, La Meije and Aiguille du Dru in the 1930s. She carried on climbing into her 60s, ascending Mount Fuji in Japan in 1963.

Glynne gave a series of lectures to the Royal Geographical Society on Angkor Wat and other parts of Cambodia during the 1950s and 1960s. She was recognised by the Cambodia tourist board in their printed guides to the site.

== Legacy and death ==
Glynne was made a fellow of the Institute of Biology and in the 1960 Birthday Honours, she was appointed Officer of the Most Excellent Order of the British Empire (OBE) for her services to agriculture, and retired that same year. Instead of giving up work completely she moved to a volunteer role at Rothamsted for two more years. In mountaineering, Glynne was a member of the Fell & Rock Climbing Club, the Pinnacle Club and vice-president of the Ladies' Alpine Club. In 1991, at the age of 96, Glynne developed bronchopneumonia and died in her nursing home in Harpenden.

== Bibliography ==
- Glynne, Mary D. (February 1925). "Infection Experiments with Wart Disease of Potatoes Synchytrium Endobioticum (SCHILB.) PERC". Annals of Applied Biology. 12 (1): 34–60. doi:10.1111/j.1744-7348.1925.tb02254.x.
- Roach, W. A.; Glynne, Mary D.; Brierley, WM. B.; Crowther, E. M. (May 1925). "Experiments on the control of wart disease of potatoes by soil treatment with particular reference to the use of sulphur". Annals of Applied Biology. 12 (2): 152–190. doi:10.1111/j.1744-7348.1925.tb02261.x.
- Glynne, Mary D. (February 1926). "The Viability of the Winter Sporangium of Synchytrium Endobioticum (SCHILB.) PERC., The Organism causing wart disease in potato". Annals of Applied Biology. 13 (1): 19–36. doi:10.1111/j.1744-7348.1926.tb04250.x.
- Glynne, Mary D. (August 1926). "Wart Disease of Potatoes: The Development of Synchytrium Endobioticum (SCHILB.) PERG, in "Immune" Varieties". Annals of Applied Biology. 13 (3): 358–359. doi:10.1111/j.1744-7348.1926.tb04282.x.
- Glynne, Mary D. (May 1935). "Incidence of Take-All on Wheat and Barley on Experimental Plots at Woburn". Annals of Applied Biology. 22 (2): 225–235. doi:10.1111/j.1744-7348.1935.tb07157.x.
- Glynne, Mary D. (August 1942). "Cercosporella Herpotrichoides fron., Causing eyespot of wheat in Great Britain". Annals of Applied Biology. 29 (3): 254–264. doi:10.1111/j.1744-7348.1942.tb07591.x.
- Glynne, Mary D.; Dion, W. M.; Weil, J. W. (November 1945). "The effect of eyespot (Cercosporella herpotrichoides Fron.) on wheat and the influence of nitrogen on the disease". Annals of Applied Biology. 32 (4): 297–303. doi:10.1111/j.1744-7348.1945.tb06260.x.
- Glynne, Mary D.; Moore, F. Joan (September 1949). "Effect of Previous Crops on the incidence of Eyespot on Winter Wheat". Annals of Applied Biology. 36 (3): 341–351. doi:10.1111/j.1744-7348.1949.tb06931.x. PMID 18143240.
- Glynne, Mary D. (September 1951). "Effects of Cultural Treatments on Wheat and on the Incidence of Eyespot, Lodging, Take-All and Weeds. (Field Experiments 1945–8)". Annals of Applied Biology. 38 (3): 665–688. doi:10.1111/j.1744-7348.1951.tb07837.x.
- Glynne, Mary D. (March 1953). "Wheat yield and soil-borne diseases". Annals of Applied Biology. 40 (1): 221–224. doi:10.1111/j.1744-7348.1953.tb02382.x.
- Glynne, Mary D. (March 1959). "Effect of Potash on Powdery Mildew in Wheat". Plant Pathology. 8 (1): 15–16. Bibcode:1959PPath...8...15G. doi:10.1111/j.1365-3059.1959.tb00861.x.
- Glynne, Mary D.; Slope, D. B. (June 1959). "Effects of previous wheat crops, seed-rate and nitrogen on Eyespot, Take-All, weeds and yields of two varieties of winter wheat: Field Experiment 1954–56". Annals of Applied Biology. 47 (2): 187–199. doi:10.1111/j.1744-7348.1959.tb02536.x.
- Glynne, Mary D. (April 1963). "Eyespot (Cercosporella herpotrichoides) and other factors influencing yield of wheat in the six-course rotation experiment at Rothamsted (1930–60)". Annals of Applied Biology. 51 (2): 189–214. doi:10.1111/j.1744-7348.1963.tb03687.x.
