= Malcolm Arthur Smith =

British herpetologist and physician in the royal court of Siam

Malcolm Arthur Smith (1875 in New Malden, Surrey – 22 July 1958 in Ascot) was a herpetologist and physician who worked in the Malay Peninsula.

== Early life ==
Smith was interested in reptiles and amphibians from an early age. After completing a degree in medicine and surgery in London in 1898, he left for the then Kingdom of Siam (today Thailand) as a doctor to the British Embassy in Bangkok. In 1921, he married Eryl Glynne of Bangor, who as well as being medically trained, made significant collections of ferns from Thailand and later worked at RBG Kew. She was killed in a car crash near Bangkok in 1930. The couple had three children including the mountaineer Cymryd "Cym" Smith, also killed in a road accident. Eryl was the elder sister of the mountaineer and plant pathologist Mary Dilys Glynne.

== Work ==
Smith went on to become the physician in the royal court of Siam and was a close confidant and a doctor to the royal family. He published his observations on the reptiles and amphibians during his stint there and was in regular correspondence with Boulenger at the Natural History Museum, London. He left in 1925 to continue his studies at the museum in London.

He was the founder and president of the British Herpetological Society which operated from within the Linnean Society.

== Legacy ==
Malcolm Smith is commemorated in the scientific names of six species of reptiles: Dibamus smithi, Enhydris smithi (synonym of Enhydris jagorii), Fimbrios smithi, Hemidactylus malcolmsmithi, Indotyphlops malcolmi, and Trimeresurus malcolmi.

== Publications ==
- (1926). Monograph of the Sea-snakes.
- (1947). A Physician at the Court of Siam
- (1931–1943). The Fauna of British India, Including Ceylon and Burma. 3 volumes on Reptiles and Amphibians.
- (1951). The British Amphibians and Reptiles.
