= Clasterosporium =

Scientific classification
- Kingdom: Fungi
- Division: Ascomycota
- Class: Sordariomycetes
- Order: Magnaporthales
- Family: Magnaporthaceae
- Genus: Clasterosporium; Schwein. 1832

Species
- See text.

Genus of fungi

Clasterosporium is a genus of fungi in the family Magnaporthaceae.

== Species ==
- Clasterosporium abutilonis
- Clasterosporium anomalum
- Clasterosporium arundinaceum
- Clasterosporium asclepiadis
- Clasterosporium asperum
- Clasterosporium bambusae
- Clasterosporium biseptatum
- Clasterosporium bonordenii
- Clasterosporium brunneum
- Clasterosporium bulbophilum
- Clasterosporium caespitulosum
- Clasterosporium calami
- Clasterosporium capsularum
- Clasterosporium caricicola
- Clasterosporium caricinum
- Clasterosporium caulincola
- Clasterosporium celastri
- Clasterosporium celatum
- Clasterosporium citri
- Clasterosporium clavaeforme
- Clasterosporium clavatum
- Clasterosporium coccolobae
- Clasterosporium cocoicola
- Clasterosporium coffeanum
- Clasterosporium congestum
- Clasterosporium convolvuli
- Clasterosporium cornigerum
- Clasterosporium cornutum
- Clasterosporium coryphae
- Clasterosporium curvatum
- Clasterosporium cyperacearum
- Clasterosporium cyperi
- Clasterosporium diffusum
- Clasterosporium domus-aliena
- Clasterosporium dothideoides
- Clasterosporium elasticae
- Clasterosporium ellisii
- Clasterosporium eocenicum
- Clasterosporium epiphyllum
- Clasterosporium eremita
- Clasterosporium eruca
- Clasterosporium flagellatum
- Clasterosporium flexum
- Clasterosporium fragile
- Clasterosporium glomerae
- Clasterosporium harknessii
- Clasterosporium herculeum
- Clasterosporium hirudinoides
- Clasterosporium hirudo
- Clasterosporium hormiscioides
- Clasterosporium hydrangeae
- Clasterosporium isopyri
- Clasterosporium javanicum
- Clasterosporium kansense
- Clasterosporium lathyri
- Clasterosporium leptopus
- Clasterosporium ligustri
- Clasterosporium lindavianum
- Clasterosporium linguaeforme
- Clasterosporium lini
- Clasterosporium longisporum
- Clasterosporium maculans
- Clasterosporium maculatum
- Clasterosporium magnusianum
- Clasterosporium mastigophorum
- Clasterosporium microscopicum
- Clasterosporium minus
- Clasterosporium mori
- Clasterosporium negeri
- Clasterosporium nitens
- Clasterosporium obclavatum
- Clasterosporium ontariense
- Clasterosporium ovoideum
- Clasterosporium parasiticum
- Clasterosporium pistaciae
- Clasterosporium polypodii
- Clasterosporium populi
- Clasterosporium proteae
- Clasterosporium psilosporoides
- Clasterosporium pulchrum
- Clasterosporium pulvinatum
- Clasterosporium punctatum
- Clasterosporium punctiforme
- Clasterosporium pyrosporum
- Clasterosporium radicicola
- Clasterosporium resinae
- Clasterosporium roupalae
- Clasterosporium sarcopodioides
- Clasterosporium scleriae
- Clasterosporium sigmoideum
- Clasterosporium sparsum
- Clasterosporium stevensii
- Clasterosporium strepsiceras
- Clasterosporium strumarum
- Clasterosporium subulatum
- Clasterosporium tamaricinum
- Clasterosporium therryanum
- Clasterosporium toruloides
- Clasterosporium toruloideum
- Clasterosporium traversoanum
- Clasterosporium tripartitum
- Clasterosporium typhicola
- Clasterosporium uncinatum
- Clasterosporium zeae
