= Harpophora =

Scientific classification
- Kingdom: Fungi
- Division: Ascomycota
- Class: Sordariomycetes
- Order: Magnaporthales
- Family: Magnaporthaceae
- Genus: Harpophora; W. Gams 2000

Species
- Harpophora graminicola Harpophora maydis Harpophora oryzae Harpophora radicicola Harpophora zeicola

Genus of fungi

Harpophora is a genus of fungi in the family Magnaporthaceae.
