= Gray leaf spot =

Fungal plant disease

Gray leaf spot (GLS) is a foliar fungal disease that affects grasses. In grasses other than maize, it is caused by Pyricularia grisea, which only infects perennial ryegrass, tall fescue, and St. Augustine grass in places with warm and rainy climates.

== Symptoms ==
Early symptoms of gray leaf spot can be seen on leaves as small, spherical lesions with a yellow halo around them. These first lesions may be tan or brown before fungal sporulation begins. The initial disease can be hard to identify as gray leaf spot at this stage because it looks similar to eyespot and common rust. However, as the lesions mature they elongate into rectangular, narrow, brown to gray spots that usually develop on the lower leaves and spread upward on the plant during the season. The lesions elongate and expand parallel to the leaf veins and can be 1.5 to 2 inches long. With favorable weather the lesions can rapidly merge and kill the entire leaf. Mature gray leaf spot symptoms can also be confused with symptoms of anthracnose leaf blight.

== Disease cycle ==
Gray leaf spot, known as Pyricularia grisea, is an ascomycete fungus that is known only by its anamorph form. The teleomorph phase (perfect sexual phase) has not been observed in turf but is predicted to use perithecium as the ascocarp structure to form ascospores. This form of the pathogen is known as Magnaporthe grisea. The anamorph phase is what is found in nature and the asexual spores are produced on naked conidia. These conidia are the source of primary inoculum and are formed by mycelium that overwinters in plant debris. The disease is polycyclic and has secondary inoculum from conidia. Both the primary and secondary inoculum can be dispersed by wind, rain, wind-blown-rain, maintenance equipment, and golfing activities. Infection can begin in the early summer but will not become apparent until late summer to early fall when lesions become visible.

== Environment ==
Fungicides and disease pressure in general follow some set guidelines on which environments will provide an optimal conditions for infection. Stress can be occur on turf through various factors such as drought, soil compaction, low and constant mowing heights and excessive nitrogen. For gray leaf spot, some of the most essential aspects for development of the disease is the presence of water and high temperatures. 14 hours of continuous leaf wetness is required to initiate infection. This could occur in a few environmental situations including excessive cloud cover, high humidity, over irrigation and mistimed irrigation. Additionally temperatures upwards of 70 degrees and up to 95 degrees Fahrenheit contribute greatly to the development of gray leaf spot. Excessive nitrogen is also a known factor in the increase of fungal diseases in turf disease species. Improper nitrogen fertilization and timing lead to an increased risk of gray leaf spot. Low amounts of silicon in soil have also been linked to development of fungal diseases including gray leaf spot. Most golf course soils contain high amounts of sand which are low in silicon promoting the development of fungal diseases such as gray leaf spot. This disease is found on perennial ryegrass, St. Augustine grass and tall and fine fescues making golf courses a primary target. Cultural practices used on golf courses that could improve conditions for infection are low mowing heights causing increased stress, poorly managed irrigation systems and equipment moving across large areas of turf including mowers, golf carts and core aerifiers which increase soil compaction. Additionally weather can cause spread of conidia by wind, rain and wind-blown-rain.

== Management ==
Prevention is the best option for management of gray leaf spot as hyphae on plant debris is the primary source of inoculum. There are various cultivars of St. Augustine grass, perennial ryegrass and tall fescue on the market that have variable resistance to gray leaf spot but none are confirmed as completely resistant. Cultural practices to reduce stress are the next step for gray leaf spot prevention and control. Extended leaf wetness is a requisite for disease development; meaning irrigation time and duration management are essential to reduce long wetness periods and relieve drought stress. Proper mowing technique is another management practice that will assist in control. Turf must be mowed frequently in order to reduce the leaf length and maintain low leaf wetness through increased drying. Removal of clippings can help deter an epidemic in lower intensity situations but is not as feasible or effective on large areas of high intensity. Relief of soil compaction through core aerification improves moisture uptake as well as reducing turf stress. Excessive nitrogen application can cause increase in many diseases and should be regulated through soil testing. Managers should only apply fertilizer while not stressing the turf. Additionally silicon amendments to soils lacking in plant available silicon have been shown to reduce the severity of gray leaf spot. Some developments have also been made in biological control where various bacterium species have been shown as an alternative to fungicides in control of gray leaf spot. Looking at the most common source of control would be the use of various wide spectrum fungicides. The most common active ingredients known to be effective in the control of gray leaf spot are azoxystrobin, trifloxystrobin, thiophanate. Trifloxystrobin and thiophanate are common ingredients in broad spectrum stress guards such as Compass, Exteris and Fame. Azoxystrobin is the most common and effective method used for gray leaf spot and goes by its common name Heritage. All fungicides need to be applied early in the disease cycle as spread is too quick to stop late in the season so most application must be done in early summer. It Must be considered as well that all fungicides have the potential for resistance development when used in large amounts so rotation of various fungicides is recommended.
