= Eryl Smith =

Welsh botanist

- Born: Eryl Glynne c. 1893; Glyndyl, North Wales
- Died: 1930
- Known for: Collection and study of ferns from Thailand and the Malay Peninsula
- Spouse: Malcolm Arthur Smith

Eryl Smith (née Glynne; c. 1893–1930) was a Welsh doctor, botanist and plant collector. She completed her medical training at the London School of Medicine for Women and the Royal Free Hospital. After moving with her husband, Dr. Malcolm Smith, to Siam, she became interested in botany and plant collecting. From 1921 to 1925, she collected plants for the British Museum herbarium. Later, she worked at the Royal Botanic Gardens, Kew, completing work on the ferns of Thailand.

== Early life and education ==
Smith was born Eryl Glynne in Glyndyl, North Wales, near Bangor. She began training as a medical doctor at University College, Bangor, completing her studies at the London School of Medicine for Women and the Royal Free Hospital. Her younger sister is the plant pathologist and mountaineer Mary Dilys Glynne.

== Career ==
Smith started her career as a medical doctor. She became interested in botany and plant collecting when she moved to what was then called Siam, in 1921. Smith travelled across Siam (visiting the Nakawn Sritamarat Mountains), Cambodia (visiting the Kam Chay Mountains), Hainan (visiting the Five Finger Mountains), the Malay Peninsula and the Malay Archipelago, studying the flora and collecting plant specimens. She specialised in the study of Pteridophyta. Between 1928 and 1930, Smith worked in the Herbarium of the Royal Botanic Gardens, Kew, studying ferns of the Malay Peninsula. Smith donated many of the fern specimens she collected to the Kew Herbarium, some of which have been digitised and are available to view online. Smith's entire collection of Thai and Malay fern specimens were donated posthumously by her husband to Kew in 1930. Her collection added many new fern specimens to the Kew Herbarium.

== Personal life ==
Smith married Dr Malcolm Arthur Smith. She moved with him to Bangkok in 1921, where he was practising medicine. She returned to England in 1925.

== Death and legacy ==
Smith was killed in a motor accident on 25 January 1930, aged 36.

The Archives of the Royal Botanic Gardens, Kew, holds a collection of her correspondence, filed within the AFG Kerr Personal Papers collection, as well as two collecting notebooks from 1922 - 1924.

Numerous fern species have been named after Smith, for example, Adiantum erylliae.

Due to her untimely death, Smith was unable to fulfil her goal of completing a comprehensive publication on the ferns of Thailand. However, she did publish a paper, On a collection of ferns from Kaw Tao, Surat in her lifetime. Her donated plant specimens and archived papers remain of use to botanists today.

== Publications ==
- On a collection of ferns from Kaw Tao, Surat. Journ. Siam Soc., 8, 1929. pp. 1-9.
