= Magnaporthiopsis =

Scientific classification
- Kingdom: Fungi
- Division: Ascomycota
- Class: Sordariomycetes
- Order: Magnaporthales
- Family: Magnaporthaceae
- Genus: Magnaporthiopsis; Luo J, Zhang N. (2013)

Species
- Magnaporthiopsis incrustans Magnaporthiopsis poae Magnaporthiopsis rhizophila

Genus of fungi

Magnaporthiopsis is a genus of ascomycete fungi. It has three species.

== Morphology ==
Magnaporthiopsis is characterised by black and globose perithecia with a cylindrical neck, a double-layered perithecial wall, clavate asci with a refractive apical ring, fusiform to fusoid and septate ascospores, simple hyphopodia, and anamorph similar to Phialophora.
