= Ophioceras (fungus) =

Scientific classification
- Kingdom: Fungi
- Division: Ascomycota
- Class: Sordariomycetes
- Order: Magnaporthales
- Family: Magnaporthaceae
- Genus: Ophioceras; Sacc. (1883)

Species
- See text

Genus of fungi

Ophioceras is a genus of fungi in the family Magnaporthaceae.

== Species ==
- Ophioceras arcuatisporum
- Ophioceras bambusae
- Ophioceras boukokoense
- Ophioceras cecropiae
- Ophioceras chiangdaoense
- Ophioceras coffeae
- Ophioceras commune
- Ophioceras corni
- Ophioceras diaporthoides
- Ophioceras dolichostomum
- Ophioceras filiforme
- Ophioceras friesii
- Ophioceras fusiforme
- Ophioceras guttulatum
- Ophioceras hongkongense
- Ophioceras hyptidis
- Ophioceras hystrix
- Ophioceras indicus
- Ophioceras leptosporum
- Ophioceras macrocarpum
- Ophioceras majusculum
- Ophioceras miyazakiense
- Ophioceras ohiense
- Ophioceras palmae
- Ophioceras parasiticum
- Ophioceras petrakii
- Ophioceras sambuci
- Ophioceras sorghi
- Ophioceras tambopataense
- Ophioceras tenuisporum
- Ophioceras therryanum
- Ophioceras tjibodense
- Ophioceras venezuelense
- Ophioceras zeae
