= Smith's bent-toed gecko =

Conservation status
- Data Deficient (IUCN 3.1)

Scientific classification
- Kingdom: Animalia
- Phylum: Chordata
- Class: Reptilia
- Order: Squamata
- Suborder: Gekkota
- Family: Gekkonidae
- Genus: Hemidactylus
- Species: H. malcolmsmithi

Binomial name
- Hemidactylus malcolmsmithi (Constable, 1949)
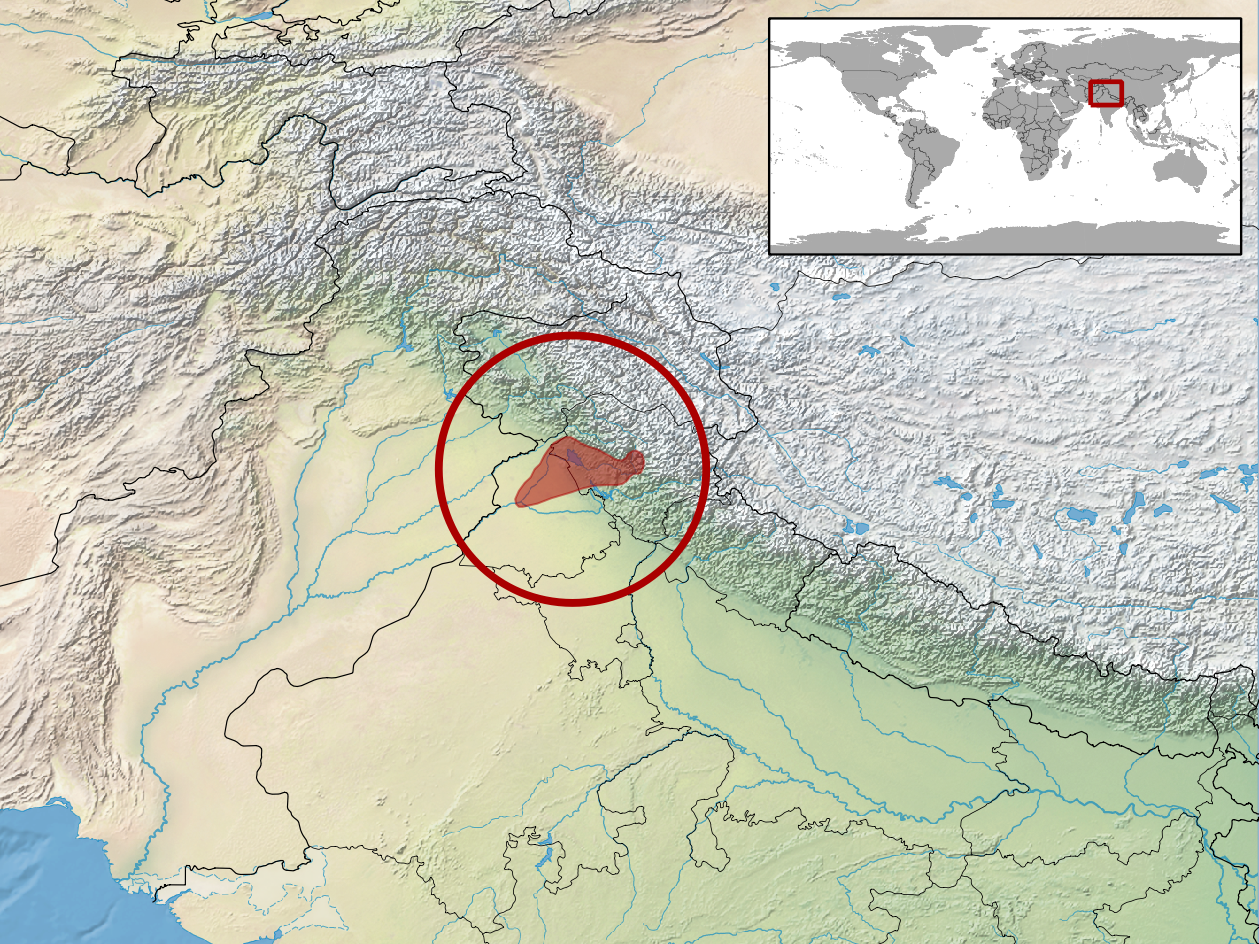

Synonyms
- Gymnodactylus malcolmsmithi Constable, 1949; Cyrtodactylus malcolmsmithi — Underwood, 1954; Hemidactylus malcolmsmithi — Agarwal, Giri & Bauer, 2018

Species of lizard

Smith's bent-toed gecko (Hemidactylus malcolmsmithi), also known commonly as Malcolm's bow-fingered gecko, is a species of lizard in the family Gekkonidae. The species is endemic to India.

== Taxonomy ==
Hemidactylus malcolmsmithi was originally described in the genus Gymnodactylus. It is sometimes placed in the genus Cyrtodactylus.

== Etymology ==
The specific name, malcolmsmithi, is in honor of British herpetologist Malcolm Arthur Smith.

== Geographic range ==
Hemidactylus malcolmsmithi is found in northern India, in the Indian state of Punjab.

The type locality is "Beas River basin, Punjab, India".

== Habitat ==
The preferred natural habitats of Hemidactylus malcolmsmithi are shrubland and forest.

== Description ==
A small species for its genus, Hemidactylus malcolmsmithi has a maximum recorded snout-to-vent length (SVL) of 5.4 cm (2.1 in). It has a series of 10–14 femoral pores on the ventral surface of each thigh, the two series being separated by two poreless scales.

== Reproduction ==
Hemidactylus malcolmsmithi is oviparous.
