= Gaeumannomyces =

Scientific classification
- Kingdom: Fungi
- Division: Ascomycota
- Class: Sordariomycetes
- Order: Magnaporthales
- Family: Magnaporthaceae
- Genus: Gaeumannomyces; Arx & D.L. Olivier 1952

Species
- See text.

Genus of fungi

Gaeumannomyces is a genus of fungi in the family Magnaporthaceae.

== Species ==
- Gaeumannomyces amomi
- Gaeumannomyces caricis
- Gaeumannomyces cylindrosporus
- Gaeumannomyces graminis
  - Gaeumannomyces graminis var. avenae
  - Gaeumannomyces graminis var. graminis
  - Gaeumannomyces graminis var. maydis
  - Gaeumannomyces graminis var. tritici
- Gaeumannomyces incrustans
- Gaeumannomyces licualae
- Gaeumannomyces medullaris
- Gaeumannomyces mirabilis
- Gaeumannomyces wongoonoo
