= Nakataea =

Scientific classification
- Kingdom: Fungi
- Division: Ascomycota
- Class: Sordariomycetes
- Order: Magnaporthales
- Family: Magnaporthaceae
- Genus: Nakataea; Hara 1939

Species
- Nakataea curvularioides Nakataea fusispora Nakataea rarissima Nakataea serpens

Genus of fungi

Nakataea is a genus of fungi in the family Magnaporthaceae.
