= Fungal effectors =

Molecules secreted by pathogenic fungi to modulate the host's immune response

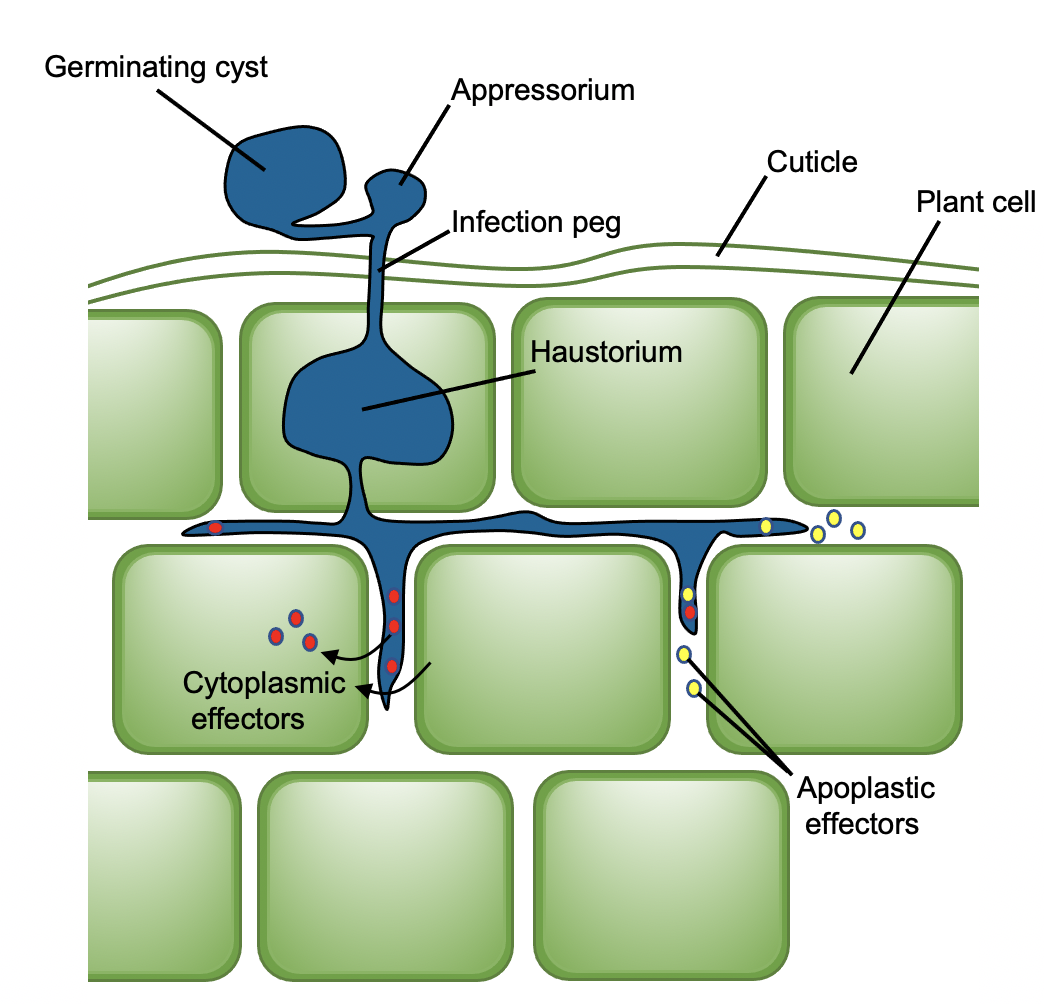
A diagram showing the infecting structures and effector delivery strategies of a model hemibiotrophic pathogen, Phytophthora infestans.

Fungal effectors are proteins or non-proteinaceous molecules (such as RNAs or small molecules) secreted by pathogenic fungi into a host organism in order to modulate the host's immune response.

== Plant pathogenic fungi ==
In the first stages of infection, conserved molecules from the fungal pathogen's cell wall, such as polysaccharides and chitin, are recognised by membrane-localised pattern recognition receptors (PRRs) on the plant host's side. Such conserved molecules are generally described as pathogen-associated molecular patterns (PAMPs) or microbe-associated molecular patterns (MAMPs) and the initial innate immune response that their recognition triggers is known as PAMP-triggered immunity (PTI).

In order to counteract PTI, fungal pathogens secrete effector proteins into the host, some of which may directly inhibit components of the innate immune response cascade. One example is the conserved effector NIS1, present in fungal pathogens from the Ascomycota and Basidiomycota phyla. NIS1 blocks PAMP-triggered immune responses by interacting with the PRR-associated kinases BAK1 and BIK1 and preventing these kinases from interacting with their downstream partners. To protect themselves from the actions of effector proteins, plants have evolved resistance proteins (R proteins), which may in turn recognise an effector and trigger a second tier of immune responses, known as effector-triggered immunity (ETI).

== Site of action ==
Plant pathogenic fungi use two distinct effector secretion systems and each secretory pathway is specific to an effector family:

- apoplastic effectors act in the apoplast, the extracellular space outside the host plant's cells. In the model pathogen Magnaporthe oryzae, apoplastic effectors are secreted into a distinct compartment enclosing the growing hypha named the EIHM (extra-invasive hyphal membrane).
- cytoplasmic effectors enter the host cells' cytoplasm. Cytoplasmic effectors of the pathogen Magnaporthe oryzae are accumulated into a complex plant-derived structure named the biotrophic interfacial complex (BIC) and they are later translocated across the EIHM inside the plant cell. It has been shown that cytoplasmic effectors can move through a few layers of plant cells, probably a way to prepare them for hyphal invasion.

== Fungal pathogens ==
Pathogen nutrition	Pathogen species	Plant disease and host plant species	Known effectors and their functions
Biotrophic	Blumeria hordei (Bgh)	Powdery mildew on barley	AVR_{A10} - recognized by the MLA10 R-protein from barley. AVR_{K1} - recognized by the MLK1 R-protein from barley.
Biotrophic	Cladosporium fulvum	Leaf mould on tomato	Ecp6 - sequesters chitin, making less chitin available to bind PRRs. Avr4 - binds to chitin oligomers in the fungal cell wall, protecting it from degradation by chitinases.
Biotrophic	Ustilago maydis	Corn smut (maize)	Pep1; Pit2; Cmu1; Tin2; See1
Hemibiotrophic	Fusarium oxysporum f. sp. lycopersici	Tomato vascular wilt	Six1 (Avr3) - recognised by the R-protein I-3 from tomato, and when this happens local cell death is triggered as a defense mechanism. Six3 (Avr2) - recognised by the R-protein I-2, triggering local cell death. Six4 (Avr1) - suppresses I-2 and I-3-mediated cell death; in resistant tomato varieties Avr1 is recognised and neutralised by I and I-1. Six6 - suppresses I-2 and I-3-mediated cell death.
Hemibiotrophic	Leptosphaeria maculans	Blackleg disease on Brassica crops.	AvrLm1; AvrLm2; AvrLm3
Hemibiotrophic	Magnaporthe oryzae	Rice blast disease	Cytoplasmic effectors: Avr-Pizt - interacts with the E3 ubiquitin ligase APIP6, which indirectly leads to reduced Reactive Oxygen Species (ROS) production and suppresses the expression of defence-related genes. Pwl1, Pwl2, Bas1, Avr-Pita, MC69 Apoplastic effectors: Slp1 - binds to and sequesters chitin oligosaccharides. As a result, chitin is unavailable to bind to the host's chitin elicitor binding protein (CEBiP) and elicit PAMP-triggered defence responses. BAS4, BAS113
Hemibiotrophic	Phytophthora infestans	Potato blight	AVR3a - cytoplasmic effector interacting with and stabilising the plant E3 ubiquitin ligase CMPG1. As a result CMPG1 is unable to get degraded and trigger cell death, allowing the pathogen to obtain nutrients from living host cells (biotrophy). AVRblb2 - a cytoplasmic effector preventing the secretion of a papain-like cysteine protease (C14) from the host, which would otherwise serve to degrade fungal effector proteins.
Necrotrophic	Pyrenophora tritici-repentis	Tan spot of wheat.	PtrToxA; PtrToxB
Necrotrophic	Parastognospora nodorum	Septoria nodorum blotch in wheat.	SnToxA; SnTox1; SnTox2; SnTox3; SnTox4; SnTox5; SnTox6; SnTox7; SnTox8
Necrotrophic	Cochliobolus heterostrophus	Southern corn leaf blight (maize)	ChToxA - in maize varieties sensitive to ToxA it induces leaf necrosis in response to light.
Necrotrophic	Cochliobolus sativus		BsToxA
Necrotrophic	Corynespora cassiicola	Corynespora leaf fall disease in rubber trees	Cassiicolin - disrupts the membranes of host plant cells, causing leaf necrosis.
Necrotrophic	Cochliobolus victoriae		victorin
