= Effector (biology) =

Small molecule affecting biological activity

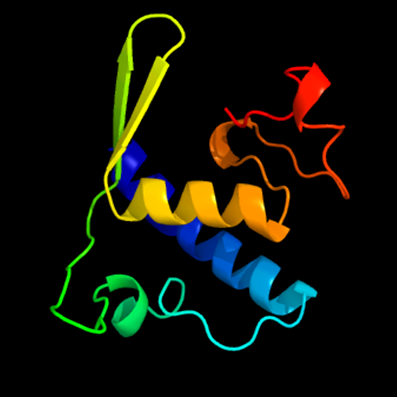
Example of a Serrate RNA effector molecule

In biology, an effector is a general term that can refer to several types of molecules or cells. In the context of biological system regulation, an effector is an element of a regulation loop controlling a regulated quantity.

Small molecule effectors

- A small molecule that selectively binds to a protein to regulate its biological activity can be called an effector. In this manner, effector molecules act as ligands that can increase or decrease enzyme activity, gene expression, influence cell signaling, or other protein functions. An example of such an effector is oxygen, which is an allosteric effector of hemoglobin - oxygen binding to one of the four hemoglobin subunits greatly increases the affinity of the rest of the subunits to oxygen. Certain drug molecules also fall into this category - for example the antibiotic rifampicin used in the treatment of tuberculosis binds the initiation σ factor subunit of the bacterial RNA polymerase, preventing the transcription of bacterial genes.
- The term can also be used to describe small molecules that can directly bind to and regulate the expression of mRNAs. One example for such an effector is guanine, which can be recognised by specific sequences (known as riboswitches) found on mRNAs, and its binding to those sequences prevents the translation of the mRNA into a protein. See also: purine riboswitch.

Protein effectors

- An effector can also be used to refer to a protein that is involved in cellular signal transduction cascades. Such an example are RAS effector proteins, which are all able to bind RAS.GTP, but trigger different cell pathways upon doing so - such as the Ras-Raf-MEK-ERK pathway, the PI3K pathway or several others.
- An effector hormone is a hormone that acts on a particular tissue - an example of such a hormone is thyroxine (T4), which regulates metabolism in many tissues throughout the body.
- Antibody Effectors are effectors involved with the production and secretion of molecules involved in pathogen defense, such as Immunoglobulin. Many antibodies then act as effector molecules for the immune system of the organism.
- Bacterial effector proteins are proteins injected by (usually pathogenic) bacterial cells into the cells of their host. The injected proteins serve different functions dependent on the bacteria of origin, but typically serve the purpose of inhibiting the host cells immune response. An example of these are the Transcription activator-like effector (TALE) proteins secreted by bacteria from the genus Xanthomonas.
- Fungal effectors are secreted by pathogenic or beneficial fungi into and around host cells by invasive hyphae to disable defense components or facilitate colonization. Protein secretion systems in fungi involve the Spitzenkörper.

RNA effectors

- Certain plant pathogens, such as Botrytis cinerea, secrete small RNAs (sRNAs) into the host cells and downregulate plant proteins involved in the immune response by RNA interference.

Effector cells

- In immunology, effector cells are cells of either the innate or the adaptive immune system that mediate the immune response.
- Effector neurons can be used to refer to population of neurons in the nervous system, which are responsible for a certain brain function. An example are the neurons in the mesopontine tegmental anesthesia area (MPTA) of the brainstem, which have been mapped as the region of the brain that is responsive to anaesthetics in a rodent model.

== Types ==
- Enzyme activator
- Enzyme inhibitor
