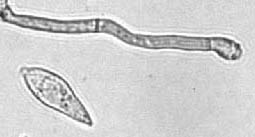
- Image of Magnaporthe grisea

Scientific classification
- Kingdom: Fungi
- Division: Ascomycota
- Class: Sordariomycetes
- Order: Magnaporthales
- Family: Magnaporthaceae; P.F.Cannon (1994)

Genera
- See text

= Magnaporthaceae =

Family of fungi

The Magnaporthaceae are a family of fungi in the order Magnaporthales. It was circumscribed by Paul F. Cannon in 1994 for a group of grass-associated fungi centered on Magnaporthe (Nakataea). Magnaporthaceae have a harpophora-like asexual morphology and are often associated with roots of grasses or cereals.

Important pathogens from the Magnaporthaceae include Nakataea oryzae, Gaeumannomyces graminis, Magnaporthiopsis poae and Magnaporthe rhizophila.

== Taxonomy and systematics ==
Type genus: Nakataea Hara (= Magnaporthe R.A. Krause & R.K. Webster)

Type species: Nakataea oryzae (Catt.) J. Luo & N. Zhang

=== Description ===
Magnaporthaceae that reproduce sexually, have perithecial ascomata that are immersed in host tissue, frequently with long necks. Asci are cylindrical and stain positive in Meltzer's reagent. Ascospores are curved to sigmoid and contain septa. They show variability in their morphology and can be filiform (Gaeumannomyces) or fusiform (Nakataea = Magnaporthe). The colour of ascospores is hyaline to olivaceous.

Asexual morphs have hyaline to pale brown conidia, which are septate to aseptate, straight or curved and variable in shape.

=== Higher order systematics ===
Magnaporthaceae used to be the only family within the order Magnaporthales, which are closely related to the orders Diaporthales and Ophiostomatales. Phylogenetic analysis showed that three clear clades could be distinguished within the Magnaporthales. The Magnaporthaceae are sister to Pyriculariaceae, and Ophioceraceae.

=== Taxonomic history ===
The family Magnaporthaceae was originally described with six genera and around 20 species comprising mainly necrotrophic and hemibiotrophic plant pathogens infecting root and shoots of Poaceae and Cyperaceae. Later, endophytic or apparently saprotrophic taxa on non-gramineous hosts were also added. Based on a multilocus phylogeny it was suggested that both Magnaporthe and Gaeumannomyces are polyphyletic genera. Resolving the polyphyletic nature of Pyricularia led to the definition of the family Pyriculariaceae and separated Pyricularia species from Magnaporthe species. The rice blast fungus Pyricularia oryzae (syn. Magnaporthe oryzae) is accommodated in the Pyriculariaceae, while Magnaporthe salvinii (now Nakataea oryzae) causing stem rot in rice, belongs to the Magnaporthaceae.

=== Differentiation from other families ===
Magnaporthaceae are distinguished from Pyriculariaceae by their asexual morphs. For Magnaporthaceae, the morphology of phialophora- or harpophora-like species is characterised by falcate versicoloured conidia on brown, erect conidiophores. In the case of Pyriculariaceae, Pyricularia or pyricularia-like species are characterised by pyriform 2-septate conidia and rhexolytic secession.

== Genera ==
- Buergenerula
- Bussabanomyces
- Ceratosphaerella
- Clasterosporium
- Endopyricularia
- Gaeumannomyces
- Harpophora
- Herbampulla
- Kohlmeyeriopsis
- Magnaporthiopsis
- Nakataea
- Ophioceras
- Omnidemptus
- Pyriculariopsis
- Slopeiomyces
