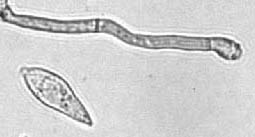
- Magnaporthe grisea

Scientific classification
- Kingdom: Fungi
- Division: Ascomycota
- Class: Sordariomycetes
- Subclass: Diaporthomycetidae
- Order: Magnaporthales; Thongk., Vijaykr. & K.D. Hyde 2009

Families
- Ceratosphaeriaceae (1); Magnaporthaceae (24); Ophioceraceae (2); Pseudohalonectriaceae (1); Pyriculariaceae (11)

= Magnaporthales =

Order of fungi

The Magnaporthales are an order of fungi within the class Sordariomycetes and subclass Diaporthomycetidae. It has several water based species and genera.

== History ==
Family Magnaporthaceae was introduced by Cannon in 1994. The placement of the taxa of family Magnaporthaceae had long been problematic due to the lack of convincing morphological and inconclusive molecular data studies (Thongkantha et al. 2009). Then based on DNA phylogenies, Magnaporthaceae was placed as a family in the Sordariomycetes (Kirk et al. 2001, Lumbsch & Huhndorf 2007, Maharachchikumbura et al. 2016). Thongkantha et al. (2009) established a new order, Magnaporthales to accommodate family Magnaporthaceae based on characters and phylogenetic analysis. Then Maharachchikumbura et al. (2016) listed families Magnaporthaceae, Ophioceraceae, and Pyriculariaceae in order Magnaporthales based on the literature and phylogenetic analysis. Pseudohalonectriaceae was introduced as a novel family in Magnaporthales to accommodate genus Pseudohalonectria based on phylogenetic and molecular dating evidence (Hongsanan et al. 2017). The stem age of genus Pseudohalonectria falls within the range of family status (95 Mya (million years ago)) and it has high support in the phylogenetic and MCC trees (Genetic tree analysis). Silva et al. (2019) introduced a new genus Bifusisporella, in family Magnaporthaceae, to accommodate an endophytic fungus from Brazil, found on the healthy leaves of Sorghum bicolor. The total divergence time for Magnaporthales is estimated as 190 MYA. In the phylogenetic study by Luo et al. (2019), Ceratosphaeria species formed a distinct clade in Magnaporthales and so they introduced family Ceratosphaeriaceae to accommodate the genus Ceratosphaeria (and its 24 species).

Wijayawardene et al. in 2020 accepted the families and genera in the order.
