= Rhodanobacter umsongensis =

Scientific classification
- Domain: Bacteria
- Kingdom: Pseudomonadati
- Phylum: Pseudomonadota
- Class: Gammaproteobacteria
- Order: Lysobacterales
- Family: Rhodanobacteraceae
- Genus: Rhodanobacter
- Species: R. umsongensis

Binomial name
- Rhodanobacter umsongensis Kim et al. 2013

Type strain
- DSM 21300, KACC 12917, strain GR24-2

Species of bacterium

Rhodanobacter umsongensis is a Gram-negative, rod-shaped and motile bacterium from the genus of Rhodanobacter which has been isolated from soil from a ginseng field from Umsong in Korea.
