= Rhodanobacter humi =

Scientific classification
- Domain: Bacteria
- Kingdom: Pseudomonadati
- Phylum: Pseudomonadota
- Class: Gammaproteobacteria
- Order: Lysobacterales
- Family: Rhodanobacteraceae
- Genus: Rhodanobacter
- Species: R. humi

Binomial name
- Rhodanobacter humi Dahal and Kim 2017

Type strain
- KACC 19048, KEMB 9005-480, NBRC 112473, strain RS22

Species of bacterium

Rhodanobacter humi is a Gram-negative, alkalitolerant, acidtolerant, aerobic, rod-shaped, non-spore-forming and non-motile bacterium from the genus of Rhodanobacter which has been isolated from forest soil.
