= Rhodanobacter glycinis =

Scientific classification
- Domain: Bacteria
- Kingdom: Pseudomonadati
- Phylum: Pseudomonadota
- Class: Gammaproteobacteria
- Order: Lysobacterales
- Family: Rhodanobacteraceae
- Genus: Rhodanobacter
- Species: R. glycinis

Binomial name
- Rhodanobacter glycinis Madhaiyan et al. 2014

Type strain
- ICMP 17626, NBRC 105007, strain MO64

Species of bacterium

Rhodanobacter glycinis is a Gram-negative, non-spore-forming and motile bacterium from the genus of Rhodanobacter which has been isolated from the rhizoplane of a field with soybeans.
