= Rhodanobacter soli =

Scientific classification
- Domain: Bacteria
- Kingdom: Pseudomonadati
- Phylum: Pseudomonadota
- Class: Gammaproteobacteria
- Order: Lysobacterales
- Family: Rhodanobacteraceae
- Genus: Rhodanobacter
- Species: R. soli

Binomial name
- Rhodanobacter soli Bui et al. 2010

Type strain
- JCM 16126, KCTC 22620, strain DCY45

Species of bacterium

Rhodanobacter soli is a Gram-negative, rod-shaped and motile bacterium from the genus of Rhodanobacter which has been isolated from soil from a ginseng field from Pocheon in Korea.
