= Rhodanobacter koreensis =

Scientific classification
- Domain: Bacteria
- Kingdom: Pseudomonadati
- Phylum: Pseudomonadota
- Class: Gammaproteobacteria
- Order: Lysobacterales
- Family: Rhodanobacteraceae
- Genus: Rhodanobacter
- Species: R. koreensis

Binomial name
- Rhodanobacter koreensis Won et al. 2015

Type strain
- JCM 19614, KACC 17650, strain THG-DD7

Species of bacterium

Rhodanobacter koreensis is a Gram-negative, aerobic, rod-shaped and non-motile bacterium from the genus of Rhodanobacter which has been isolated from rhizospheric soil of a tomato plant.
