= Rhodanobacter denitrificans =

Scientific classification
- Domain: Bacteria
- Kingdom: Pseudomonadati
- Phylum: Pseudomonadota
- Class: Gammaproteobacteria
- Order: Lysobacterales
- Family: Rhodanobacteraceae
- Genus: Rhodanobacter
- Species: R. denitrificans

Binomial name
- Rhodanobacter denitrificans Prakash et al. 2012

Type strain
- DSM 23569, JCM 17641, FW104-R3, strain 2APBS1

Species of bacterium

Rhodanobacter denitrificans is a Gram-negative and non-spore-forming bacterium from the genus of Rhodanobacter which has been isolated from sediment from a borehole from the Oak Ridge Integrated Field Research site in the United States.
