= Alkanibacter =

Scientific classification
- Domain: Bacteria
- Kingdom: Pseudomonadati
- Phylum: Pseudomonadota
- Class: Gammaproteobacteria
- Order: Nevskiales
- Family: Nevskiaceae
- Genus: Alkanibacter; Friedrich and Lipski 2008
- Species: A. difficilis

Binomial name
- Alkanibacter difficilis Friedrich and Lipski 2008

Genus of bacteria

Alkanibacter is a Gram-negative genus of bacteria from the family Nevskiaceae with one known species, Alkanibacter difficilis.

Alkanibacter difficilis was first isolated from a hexane-degrading biofilter in Hamm, Germany. It was published as a new genus and species alongside Singularimonas variicoloris (now merged into Solimonas).
