= Dokdonella ginsengisoli =

Scientific classification
- Domain: Bacteria
- Kingdom: Pseudomonadati
- Phylum: Pseudomonadota
- Class: Gammaproteobacteria
- Order: Lysobacterales
- Family: Rhodanobacteraceae
- Genus: Dokdonella
- Species: D. ginsengisoli

Binomial name
- Dokdonella ginsengisoli Ten et al. 2009

Type strain
- CCUG 52462, DSM 17954, KCTC 12564, strain Gsoil 191

Species of bacterium

Dokdonella ginsengisoli is a Gram-negative, aerobic, rod-shaped, non-spore-forming and non-motile bacterium from the genus of Dokdonella which has been isolated from soil from a field with ginseng from Pocheon in Korea.
