= Luteibacter rhizovicinus =

Scientific classification
- Domain: Bacteria
- Kingdom: Pseudomonadati
- Phylum: Pseudomonadota
- Class: Gammaproteobacteria
- Order: Lysobacterales
- Family: Rhodanobacteraceae
- Genus: Luteibacter
- Species: L. rhizovicinus

Binomial name
- Luteibacter rhizovicinus Johansen et al. 2005

Type strain
- ATCC BAA-1015, DSM 16549, strain LJ96

Synonyms
- Luteibactor rhizovicina

Species of bacterium

Luteibacter rhizovicinus is a Gram-negative, aerobic, chemoorganotrophic and motile bacterium from the genus of Luteibacter with a polar flagellum which has been isolated from rhizospheric soil of the plant Hordeum vulgare from Taastrop in Denmark.
