= Dokdonella immobilis =

Scientific classification
- Domain: Bacteria
- Kingdom: Pseudomonadati
- Phylum: Pseudomonadota
- Class: Gammaproteobacteria
- Order: Lysobacterales
- Family: Rhodanobacteraceae
- Genus: Dokdonella
- Species: D. immobilis

Binomial name
- Dokdonella immobilis Ten et al. 2009

Type strain
- CGMCC 1.7659, JCM 15763, strain LM 2-5, strain LM2-5

Species of bacterium

Dokdonella immobilis is a Gram-negative, rod-shaped, non-endospore-forming and non-motile bacterium from the genus of Dokdonella which has been isolated from a batch reactor for the treatment of triphenylmethane dye effluent.
