= Fulvimonas soli =

Scientific classification
- Domain: Bacteria
- Kingdom: Pseudomonadati
- Phylum: Pseudomonadota
- Class: Gammaproteobacteria
- Order: Lysobacterales
- Family: Rhodanobacteraceae
- Genus: Fulvimonas
- Species: F. soli

Binomial name
- Fulvimonas soli Mergaert et al. 2002

Type strain
- DSM 14263, LMG 19981

Species of bacterium

Fulvimonas soli is a motile bacterium from the genus of Fulvimonas which has been isolated from soil from Ghent in Belgium.
