= Rhodanobacter thiooxydans =

Scientific classification
- Domain: Bacteria
- Kingdom: Pseudomonadati
- Phylum: Pseudomonadota
- Class: Gammaproteobacteria
- Order: Lysobacterales
- Family: Rhodanobacteraceae
- Genus: Rhodanobacter
- Species: R. thiooxydans

Binomial name
- Rhodanobacter thiooxydans Lee et al. 2007

Type strain
- DSM 18863, KCTC 12771, FW104-T7, strain LCS2

Synonyms
- Rhodanobacter thiooxidans

Species of bacterium

Rhodanobacter thiooxydans is a Gram-negative, non-spore-forming and non-motile bacterium from the genus of Rhodanobacter which has been isolated from biofilm from Daejon in Korea.
