= Dyella agri =

Scientific classification
- Domain: Bacteria
- Kingdom: Pseudomonadati
- Phylum: Pseudomonadota
- Class: Gammaproteobacteria
- Order: Lysobacterales
- Family: Rhodanobacteraceae
- Genus: Dyella
- Species: D. agri

Binomial name
- Dyella agri Chaudhary and Kim 2017

Type strain
- JCM 31925, KACC 19176, KEMB 9005-571, strain DKC-1

Species of bacterium

Dyella agri is a Gram-negative bacterium from the genus of Dyella which has been isolated from grassland soil.
