= Dokdonella kunshanensis =

Scientific classification
- Domain: Bacteria
- Kingdom: Pseudomonadati
- Phylum: Pseudomonadota
- Class: Gammaproteobacteria
- Order: Lysobacterales
- Family: Rhodanobacteraceae
- Genus: Dokdonella
- Species: D. kunshanensis

Binomial name
- Dokdonella kunshanensis Li et al. 2013

Type strain
- CCTCC AB 2011179, KACC 16511, strain DC-3

Species of bacterium

Dokdonella kunshanensis is a Gram-negative, aerobic, non-spore-formin and non-motile bacterium from the genus of Dokdonella which has been isolated from activated sludge from a wastewater treatment plant in China.
