= Tahibacter aquaticus =

Scientific classification
- Domain: Bacteria
- Kingdom: Pseudomonadati
- Phylum: Pseudomonadota
- Class: Gammaproteobacteria
- Order: Lysobacterales
- Family: Rhodanobacteraceae
- Genus: Tahibacter
- Species: T. aquaticus

Binomial name
- Tahibacter aquaticus Makk et al. 2014

Type strain
- DSM 21667, PYM5-11, PYM5-8, RaM5-2, NCAIM B 02337

Species of bacterium

Tahibacter aquaticus is a Gram-negative, aerobic, non-spore-formin, rod-shaped and non-motile bacterium from the genus of Tahibacter which has been isolated from a drinking water supply system from Budapest in Hungary.
