= Oleiagrimonas citrea =

Scientific classification
- Domain: Bacteria
- Kingdom: Pseudomonadati
- Phylum: Pseudomonadota
- Class: Gammaproteobacteria
- Order: Lysobacterales
- Family: Rhodanobacteraceae
- Genus: Oleiagrimonas
- Species: O. citrea

Binomial name
- Oleiagrimonas citrea Yang et al. 2017

Type strain
- JCM 30904, KCCM 43131, MEBic09124

Species of bacterium

Oleiagrimonas citrea is a Gram-negative, rod-shaped and aerobic bacterium from the genus of Oleiagrimonas which has been isolated from tidal flat sediments from the Suncheon Bay in Korea.
