= Rhodanobacter fulvus =

Scientific classification
- Domain: Bacteria
- Kingdom: Pseudomonadati
- Phylum: Pseudomonadota
- Class: Gammaproteobacteria
- Order: Lysobacterales
- Family: Rhodanobacteraceae
- Genus: Rhodanobacter
- Species: R. fulvus

Binomial name
- Rhodanobacter fulvus Im et al. 2005

Type strain
- DSM 18449, IAM 15025, JCM 21488, KCTC 12098, NBRC 103168, strain Jip2

Synonyms
- Swingiella fulvus, Swingsiella fulva, Swingsiella fulvus

Species of bacterium

Rhodanobacter fulvus is a Gram-negative, aerobic, rod-shaped and motile bacterium from the genus of Rhodanobacter which has been isolated from rotten rice straw with soil from Daejon in Korea. Rhodanobacter fulvus produce beta-galactosidase.
