= Dyella kyungheensis =

Scientific classification
- Domain: Bacteria
- Kingdom: Pseudomonadati
- Phylum: Pseudomonadota
- Class: Gammaproteobacteria
- Order: Lysobacterales
- Family: Rhodanobacteraceae
- Genus: Dyella
- Species: D. kyungheensis

Binomial name
- Dyella kyungheensis Son et al. 2013

Type strain
- JCM 18747, KACC 16981, strain THG-B117

Species of bacterium

Dyella kyungheensis is a Gram-negative, aerobic and motile bacterium from the genus of Dyella with a polar flagellum which has been isolated from soil of a field with cornus fruits from Hoengseong in Korea.
