= Dokdonella soli =

Scientific classification
- Domain: Bacteria
- Kingdom: Pseudomonadati
- Phylum: Pseudomonadota
- Class: Gammaproteobacteria
- Order: Lysobacterales
- Family: Rhodanobacteraceae
- Genus: Dokdonella
- Species: D. soli

Binomial name
- Dokdonella soli Yoo et al. 2009

Type strain
- JCM 15421, KACC 12741, KIS28-6

Species of bacterium

Dokdonella soli is a Gram-negative, aerobic and rod-shaped bacterium from the genus of Dokdonella which has been isolated from soil from the island of Ulleung in Korea.
