= Dyella humi =

Scientific classification
- Domain: Bacteria
- Kingdom: Pseudomonadati
- Phylum: Pseudomonadota
- Class: Gammaproteobacteria
- Order: Lysobacterales
- Family: Rhodanobacteraceae
- Genus: Dyella
- Species: D. humi

Binomial name
- Dyella humi Chen et al. 2016

Type strain
- KCTC 42629, LMG 28842, strain DHG40

Species of bacterium

Dyella humi is a Gram-negative, aerobic, rod-shaped and motile bacterium from the genus of Dyella which has been isolated from forest soil from the Dinghushan Biosphere Reserve in China.
