= Rhodanobacter ginsenosidimutans =

Scientific classification
- Domain: Bacteria
- Kingdom: Pseudomonadati
- Phylum: Pseudomonadota
- Class: Gammaproteobacteria
- Order: Lysobacterales
- Family: Rhodanobacteraceae
- Genus: Rhodanobacter
- Species: R. ginsenosidimutans

Binomial name
- Rhodanobacter ginsenosidimutans An et al. 2009

Type strain
- DSM 21013, KACC 12822, KCTC 22231, LMG 24457, Gsoil 3054

Species of bacterium

Rhodanobacter ginsenosidimutans is a Gram-negative, aerobic, rod-shaped, non-spore-forming and non-motile bacterium from the genus of Rhodanobacter which has been isolated from soil from a ginseng field from Pocheon in Korea.
