= Dyella thiooxydans =

Scientific classification
- Domain: Bacteria
- Kingdom: Pseudomonadati
- Phylum: Pseudomonadota
- Class: Gammaproteobacteria
- Order: Lysobacterales
- Family: Rhodanobacteraceae
- Genus: Dyella
- Species: D. thiooxydans

Binomial name
- Dyella thiooxydans Anandham et al. 2011

Type strain
- KACC 12756, LMG 24673, strain ATSB10

Species of bacterium

Dyella thiooxydans is a Gram-negative, aerobic, rod-shaped, thiosulfate-oxidizing, facultatively chemolithotrophic and motile bacterium from the genus of Dyella which has been isolated from rhizospheric soil of field with sunflowers (Helianthus annuus) from Junghwa-dong in Korea.
