= Dokdonella fugitiva =

Scientific classification
- Domain: Bacteria
- Kingdom: Pseudomonadati
- Phylum: Pseudomonadota
- Class: Gammaproteobacteria
- Order: Lysobacterales
- Family: Rhodanobacteraceae
- Genus: Dokdonella
- Species: D. fugitiva

Binomial name
- Dokdonella fugitiva Cunha et al. 2006

Type strain
- CIP 108692, LMG 23001, strain A3

Synonyms
- Glaucimonas multicolorus

Species of bacterium

Dokdonella fugitiva is a Gram-negative, strictly aerobic, rod-shaped, and non-motile bacterium from the genus of Dokdonella which has been isolated from potting soil from Portugal.
