= Dyella caseinilytica =

Scientific classification
- Domain: Bacteria
- Kingdom: Pseudomonadati
- Phylum: Pseudomonadota
- Class: Gammaproteobacteria
- Order: Lysobacterales
- Family: Rhodanobacteraceae
- Genus: Dyella
- Species: D. caseinilytica

Binomial name
- Dyella caseinilytica Xia et al. 2017

Type strain
- CGMCC 1.15434, DHOB09, LMG 29202

Species of bacterium

Dyella caseinilytica is a Gram-negative, aerobic and rod-shaped bacterium from the genus of Dyella which has been isolated from forest soil from the Dinghushan Biosphere Reserve in China.
