= Dyella japonica =

Scientific classification
- Domain: Bacteria
- Kingdom: Pseudomonadati
- Phylum: Pseudomonadota
- Class: Gammaproteobacteria
- Order: Lysobacterales
- Family: Rhodanobacteraceae
- Genus: Dyella
- Species: D. japonica

Binomial name
- Dyella japonica Xie and Yokota 2005

Type strain
- ATCC BAA-939, DSM 16301, IAM 15069, JCM 21530, NBRC 102414, strain XD53

Synonyms
- Dyemonas todaii

Species of bacterium

Dyella japonica is a Gram-negative, aerobic and rod-shaped bacterium from the genus of Dyella which has been isolated from soil from a garden in Tokyo in Japan.
