= Rhodanobacter ginsengisoli =

Scientific classification
- Domain: Bacteria
- Kingdom: Pseudomonadati
- Phylum: Pseudomonadota
- Class: Gammaproteobacteria
- Order: Lysobacterales
- Family: Rhodanobacteraceae
- Genus: Rhodanobacter
- Species: R. ginsengisoli

Binomial name
- Rhodanobacter ginsengisoli Weon et al. 2007

Type strain
- DSM 18993, KACC 11762, strain GR17-7

Species of bacterium

Rhodanobacter ginsengisoli is a bacterium from the genus of Rhodanobacter which has been isolated from soil from a ginseng field from Yeongju in Korea.
