= Rhodanobacter aciditrophus =

Scientific classification
- Domain: Bacteria
- Kingdom: Pseudomonadati
- Phylum: Pseudomonadota
- Class: Gammaproteobacteria
- Order: Lysobacterales
- Family: Rhodanobacteraceae
- Genus: Rhodanobacter
- Species: R. aciditrophus

Binomial name
- Rhodanobacter aciditrophus Koh et al. 2015

Type strain
- JCM 30774, KCTC 42660, strain sjH1

Species of bacterium

Rhodanobacter aciditrophus is a Gram-negative, acidophilic, aerobic, rod-shaped and motile bacterium from the genus of Rhodanobacter which has been isolated from wastewater of a mine.
