= Dyella koreensis =

Scientific classification
- Domain: Bacteria
- Kingdom: Pseudomonadati
- Phylum: Pseudomonadota
- Class: Gammaproteobacteria
- Order: Lysobacterales
- Family: Rhodanobacteraceae
- Genus: Dyella
- Species: D. koreensis

Binomial name
- Dyella koreensis An et al. 2005

Type strain
- KCTC 12359, NBRC 100831, strain BB4

Species of bacterium

Dyella koreensis is a Gram-negative, aerobic and non-motile bacterium from the genus of Dyella which has been isolated from rhizospheric soil of bamboo plant from Korea. Dyella koreensis produces beta-glucosidase.
