= Rhodanobacter spathiphylli =

Scientific classification
- Domain: Bacteria
- Kingdom: Pseudomonadati
- Phylum: Pseudomonadota
- Class: Gammaproteobacteria
- Order: Lysobacterales
- Family: Rhodanobacteraceae
- Genus: Rhodanobacter
- Species: R. spathiphylli

Binomial name
- Rhodanobacter spathiphylli De Clercq et al. 2006

Type strain
- DSM 17631, LMG 23181, strain B39

Species of bacterium

Rhodanobacter spathiphylli is a Gram-negative bacterium from the genus of Rhodanobacter which has been isolated from the root of a Spathiphyllum plant from Leuven in Belgium.
