= Dyella soli =

Scientific classification
- Domain: Bacteria
- Kingdom: Pseudomonadati
- Phylum: Pseudomonadota
- Class: Gammaproteobacteria
- Order: Lysobacterales
- Family: Rhodanobacteraceae
- Genus: Dyella
- Species: D. soli

Binomial name
- Dyella soli Weon et al. 2009

Type strain
- JCM 15423, KACC 12747, strain JS12-10

Species of bacterium

Dyella soli is a Gram-negative, aerobic, rod-shaped, non-spore-forming and motile bacterium from the genus of Dyella with a polar flagellum which has been isolated from forest soil from Jeju Island in Korea.
