= Dyella jejuensis =

Scientific classification
- Domain: Bacteria
- Kingdom: Pseudomonadati
- Phylum: Pseudomonadota
- Class: Gammaproteobacteria
- Order: Lysobacterales
- Family: Rhodanobacteraceae
- Genus: Dyella
- Species: D. jejuensis

Binomial name
- Dyella jejuensis Kim et al. 2015

Type strain
- JCM 19615, KACC 17701, strain JP1

Species of bacterium

Dyella jejuensis is a Gram-negative, aerobic, rod-shaped and motile bacterium from the genus of Dyella which has been isolated from soil from the Hallasan Mountain on Jeju Island in Korea.
