= Ulvae =

Ulvae may refer to:

- Amylibacter ulvae, species of bacteria
- Epibacterium ulvae, species of bacteria
- Kordia ulvae, species of bacteria
- Peringia ulvae, species of snail
- Pseudoalteromonas ulvae, species of bacteria
- Winogradskyella ulvae, species of bacteria
