= Fulvimonas yonginensis =

Scientific classification
- Domain: Bacteria
- Kingdom: Pseudomonadati
- Phylum: Pseudomonadota
- Class: Gammaproteobacteria
- Order: Lysobacterales
- Family: Rhodanobacteraceae
- Genus: Fulvimonas
- Species: F. yonginensis

Binomial name
- Fulvimonas yonginensis Ahn et al. 2014

Type strain
- DSM 28344, KACC 16952, 5GHs31-2

Species of bacterium

Fulvimonas yonginensis is a Gram-negative, aerobic and rod-shaped bacterium from the genus of Fulvimonas with a polar flagellum which has been isolated from greenhouse soil from Yongin in Korea.
