= Oleiagrimonas soli =

Scientific classification
- Domain: Bacteria
- Kingdom: Pseudomonadati
- Phylum: Pseudomonadota
- Class: Gammaproteobacteria
- Order: Lysobacterales
- Family: Rhodanobacteraceae
- Genus: Oleiagrimonas
- Species: O. soli

Binomial name
- Oleiagrimonas soli Fang et al. 2015

Type strain
- CPCC 100614, KCTC 42351, NBRC 110685, strain 3.5X

Synonyms
- Oleiagrimonas gudaosoli

Species of bacterium

Oleiagrimonas soli is a bacterium from the genus of Oleiagrimonas which has been isolated from saline soil contaminated wit oil from Gudao in China.
