= Luteibacter yeojuensis =

Scientific classification
- Domain: Bacteria
- Kingdom: Pseudomonadati
- Phylum: Pseudomonadota
- Class: Gammaproteobacteria
- Order: Lysobacterales
- Family: Rhodanobacteraceae
- Genus: Luteibacter
- Species: L. yeojuensis

Binomial name
- Luteibacter yeojuensis (Kim et al. 2006) Kämpfer et al. 2009

Synonyms
- Dyella suwonensis, Dyella yeojuensis

Species of bacterium

Luteibacter yeojuensis is a bacterium from the genus of Luteibacter which has been isolated from greenhouse soil from Yeoju in Korea.
