= Tahibacter caeni =

Scientific classification
- Domain: Bacteria
- Kingdom: Pseudomonadati
- Phylum: Pseudomonadota
- Class: Gammaproteobacteria
- Order: Lysobacterales
- Family: Rhodanobacteraceae
- Genus: Tahibacter
- Species: T. caeni

Binomial name
- Tahibacter caeni Wu et al. 2015

Type strain
- CCTCC AB 2013266, KACC 17139, strain BUT-6

Species of bacterium

Tahibacter caeni is a Gram-negative, aerobic, non-spore-formin, rod-shaped and non-motile bacterium from the genus of Tahibacter which has been isolated from activated sludge from a wastewater treatment facility.
