= Rhodanobacter caeni =

Scientific classification
- Domain: Bacteria
- Kingdom: Pseudomonadati
- Phylum: Pseudomonadota
- Class: Gammaproteobacteria
- Order: Lysobacterales
- Family: Rhodanobacteraceae
- Genus: Rhodanobacter
- Species: R. caeni

Binomial name
- Rhodanobacter caeni Woo et al. 2012

Type strain
- JCM 16242, KCTC 22449, MJ01, MJ14

Species of bacterium

Rhodanobacter caeni is a Gram-negative and motile bacterium from the genus of Rhodanobacter which has been isolated from sewage sludge from Daejeon in Korea.
