= Dyella lipolytica =

Scientific classification
- Domain: Bacteria
- Kingdom: Pseudomonadati
- Phylum: Pseudomonadota
- Class: Gammaproteobacteria
- Order: Lysobacterales
- Family: Rhodanobacteraceae
- Genus: Dyella
- Species: D. lipolytica

Binomial name
- Dyella lipolytica Tang et al. 2017

Type strain
- KCTC 52132, NBRC 111473, strain DHOB07

Species of bacterium

Dyella lipolytica is a Gram-negative, aerobic, lipolytic, rod-shaped, non-spore-forming and non-motile bacterium from the genus of Dyella which has been isolated from soil from the Dinghushan Biosphere Reserve in China.
