= Luteibacter anthropi =

Scientific classification
- Domain: Bacteria
- Kingdom: Pseudomonadati
- Phylum: Pseudomonadota
- Class: Gammaproteobacteria
- Order: Lysobacterales
- Family: Rhodanobacteraceae
- Genus: Luteibacter
- Species: L. anthropi

Binomial name
- Luteibacter anthropi Kämpfer et al. 2009

Type strain
- CCM 7598, CCUG 25036, DSM 23190

Species of bacterium

Luteibacter anthropi is a bacterium from the genus of Luteibacter which has been isolated from human blood of a child from Gothenburg in Sweden.
