= Dyella jiangningensis =

Scientific classification
- Domain: Bacteria
- Kingdom: Pseudomonadati
- Phylum: Pseudomonadota
- Class: Gammaproteobacteria
- Order: Lysobacterales
- Family: Rhodanobacteraceae
- Genus: Dyella
- Species: D. jiangningensis

Binomial name
- Dyella jiangningensis Zhao et al. 2013

Type strain
- CCTCC AB 2012160, DSM 26119, KACC 16539, strain SBZ3-12

Species of bacterium

Dyella jiangningensis is a Gram-negative, aerobic and motile bacterium from the genus of Dyella with a polar flagellum which has been isolated from the surface of a rock from Nanjing in China.
