= Rhodanobacter lindaniclasticus =

Scientific classification
- Domain: Bacteria
- Kingdom: Pseudomonadati
- Phylum: Pseudomonadota
- Class: Gammaproteobacteria
- Order: Lysobacterales
- Family: Rhodanobacteraceae
- Genus: Rhodanobacter
- Species: R. lindaniclasticus

Binomial name
- Rhodanobacter lindaniclasticus Nalin et al. 1999

Type strain
- LMG 18385, strain RP5557

Synonyms
- Rhodanobacter lindanoclasticus

Species of bacterium

Rhodanobacter lindaniclasticus is a bacterium from the genus of Rhodanobacter which has been isolated from soil from a ginseng field from Poecheon in Korea.Rhodanobacter lindaniclasticus has the ability to degrade lindane.
