= Rhodanobacter rhizosphaerae =

Scientific classification
- Domain: Bacteria
- Kingdom: Pseudomonadati
- Phylum: Pseudomonadota
- Class: Gammaproteobacteria
- Order: Lysobacterales
- Family: Rhodanobacteraceae
- Genus: Rhodanobacter
- Species: R. rhizosphaerae

Binomial name
- Rhodanobacter rhizosphaerae Cho et al. 2017

Type strain
- KACC 18699, NBRC 111845, IMER-B2-6, strain CR164

Species of bacterium

Rhodanobacter rhizosphaerae is a Gram-negative, aerobic, non-spore-forming and non-motile bacterium from the genus of Rhodanobacter which has been isolated from rhizospheric soil of a ginseng plant from Geumsan in Korea.
