= Rhodanobacter panaciterrae =

Scientific classification
- Domain: Bacteria
- Kingdom: Pseudomonadati
- Phylum: Pseudomonadota
- Class: Gammaproteobacteria
- Order: Lysobacterales
- Family: Rhodanobacteraceae
- Genus: Rhodanobacter
- Species: R. panaciterrae

Binomial name
- Rhodanobacter panaciterrae Wang et al. 2011

Type strain
- KACC 12826, KCTC 22232, LMG 24460, strain LnR5-47

Species of bacterium

Rhodanobacter panaciterrae is a Gram-negative, aerobic, non-spore-forming and non-motile bacterium from the genus of Rhodanobacter which has been isolated from soil from a ginseng field from Liaoning in China.
