= Dokdonella koreensis =

Scientific classification
- Domain: Bacteria
- Kingdom: Pseudomonadati
- Phylum: Pseudomonadota
- Class: Gammaproteobacteria
- Order: Lysobacterales
- Family: Rhodanobacteraceae
- Genus: Dokdonella
- Species: D. koreensis

Binomial name
- Dokdonella koreensis Yoon et al. 2006

Type strain
- DSM 17203, KCTC 12396, strain DS-123

Species of bacterium

Dokdonella koreensis is a Gram-negative, rod-shaped, non-spore-forming and motile bacterium from the genus of Dokdonella which has been isolated from soil from Dokdo in Korea. As of 2014, its pathogenicity in humans was unclear.
