= Dyella marensis =

Scientific classification
- Domain: Bacteria
- Kingdom: Pseudomonadati
- Phylum: Pseudomonadota
- Class: Gammaproteobacteria
- Order: Lysobacterales
- Family: Rhodanobacteraceae
- Genus: Dyella
- Species: D. marensis

Binomial name
- Dyella marensis Lee and Lee 2009

Type strain
- JCM 14959, KCTC 22144, strain CS5-B2

Species of bacterium

Dyella marensis is a Gram-negative bacterium from the genus of Dyella which has been isolated from cliff soil from the Mara Island on Korea.

== Morphological and physiological traits ==
- Cell shape: Rod-shaped
- Gram stain: Gram-negative
- Motility: Motile
- Oxygen requirement: Aerobic
- Oxidase test: Negative
- Catalase test: Positive

== Growth conditions ==
- Temperature range: 20–37 °C
- Optimal growth: ~30–37 °C
- pH range: 5.1–9.1
- NaCl tolerance: 1–2 % (w/v)

== Phylogenetic relationship ==
Phylogenetic analysis based on 16S rRNA gene sequencing shows that D. marensis falls within the genus Dyella. Its closest sequence similarities are with species such as Dyella koreensis, D. ginsengisoli, and D. japonica.
