= Dyella ginsengisoli =

Scientific classification
- Domain: Bacteria
- Kingdom: Pseudomonadati
- Phylum: Pseudomonadota
- Class: Gammaproteobacteria
- Order: Lysobacterales
- Family: Rhodanobacteraceae
- Genus: Dyella
- Species: D. ginsengisoli

Binomial name
- Dyella ginsengisoli Jung et al. 2009

Type strain
- DSM 18387, KCTC 12599, strain Gsoil 3046

Species of bacterium

Dyella ginsengisoli is a Gram-negative, aerobic, rod-shaped non-spore-forming and motile bacterium from the genus of Dyella which has been isolated from soil from a ginseng field from Pocheon in Korea.
