= Nevskia terrae =

Scientific classification
- Domain: Bacteria
- Kingdom: Pseudomonadati
- Phylum: Pseudomonadota
- Class: Gammaproteobacteria
- Order: Nevskiales
- Family: Nevskiaceae
- Genus: Nevskia
- Species: N. terrae

Binomial name
- Nevskia terrae Kim et al. 2011

Type strain
- JCM 15425, KACC 12736

Species of bacterium

Nevskia terrae is a Gram-negative, strictly aerobic and motile bacterium from the genus of Nevskia which has been isolated from soil from the Baekryong Island in Korea.
