= LTAE =

LTAE may refer to:

- Akıncı Air Base
- Low-specificity L-threonine aldolase, an enzyme
