= Solimonas flava =

Scientific classification
- Domain: Bacteria
- Kingdom: Pseudomonadati
- Phylum: Pseudomonadota
- Class: Gammaproteobacteria
- Order: Nevskiales
- Family: Nevskiaceae
- Genus: Solimonas
- Species: S. flava

Binomial name
- Solimonas flava (Zhou et al. 2008) Sheu et al. 2011

Type strain
- CCTCC AB 206145, DSM 18980, KCTC 12881, strain CW-KD 4

Synonyms
- Sinobacter flavus

Species of bacterium

Solimonas flava is a Gram-negative, rod-shaped and non-motile bacterium from the genus Solimonas which has been isolated from polluted soil from Jiangsu in China.
