= Nevskia soli =

Scientific classification
- Domain: Bacteria
- Kingdom: Pseudomonadati
- Phylum: Pseudomonadota
- Class: Gammaproteobacteria
- Order: Nevskiales
- Family: Nevskiaceae
- Genus: Nevskia
- Species: N. soli

Binomial name
- Nevskia soli Weon et al. 2008

Type strain
- DSM 19509, KACC 11703, strain GR15-1

Species of bacterium

Nevskia soli is a Gram-negative, strictly aerobic, rod-shaped and motile bacterium from the genus of Nevskia which has been isolated from soil from a ginseng field from the Jeju Island in Korea.
