= Dihydromaltophilin =

Names
- IUPAC name (3E,5S,7S,8R,9S,10S,11S,13R,15R,16S,18Z)-11-Ethyl-7,24,28-trihydroxy-10-methyl-21,26-diazapentacyclo[23.2.1.0^{5,16}.0^{8,15}.0^{9,13}]octacosa-1(28),3,18-triene-2,20,27-trione
- Systematic IUPAC name (3E,5S,7S,8R,9S,13R,15R,16S)-11-Ethyl-7,28-dihydroxy-8,10-dimethyl-21,26-diazapentacyclo[23.2.1.0^{5,16}.0^{8,15}.0^{9,13}]octacosa-1(28),3-diene-2,27-dione
- Other names Heat-Stable Anti-fungal Factor (HSAF)

Identifiers
CAS Number	203304-22-7
3D model (JSmol)	Interactive image
ChemSpider	34227627
PubChem CID	101934630
- InChI: InChI=1S/C29H40N2O6/c1-3-15-11-17-12-19-18-5-4-6-23(35)30-10-9-21(33)27-28(36)26(29(37)31-27)20(32)8-7-16(18)13-22(34)25(19)24(17)14(15)2/h4,6-8,14-19,21-22,24-25,27,32-34H,3,5,9-13H2,1-2H3,(H,30,35)(H,31,37)/b6-4-,8-7+,26-20?/t14-,15-,16+,17+,18-,19+,21?,22-,24+,25-,27?/m0/s1 Key: VYCDZNHSSDXACI-SGXRADKASA-N
- SMILES: CC[C@H]1C[C@@H]2C[C@@H]3[C@H]4C/C=C\C(=O)NCCC(C5C(=C(C(=O)/C=C/[C@@H]4C[C@@H]([C@H]3[C@@H]2[C@H]1C)O)C(=O)N5)O)O

Properties
Chemical formula	C_{29}H_{40}N_{2}O_{6}
Molar mass	512.647 g·mol^{−1}
- Except where otherwise noted, data are given for materials in their standard state (at 25 °C [77 °F], 100 kPa). Infobox references

Dihydromaltophilin, or heat stable anti-fungal factor (HSAF), is a secondary metabolite of bacteria in the genera Streptomyces and Lysobacter. HSAF is a polycyclic tetramate lactam containing a single tetramic acid unit and a 5,5,6-tricyclic system. HSAF has been shown to have anti-fungal activity mediated through the disruption of a ceramide synthase that is unique to fungi.

== Biosynthesis ==
The backbone of HSAF is formed through a hybrid PKS-NRPS cluster containing one nonribosomal peptide synthase (NRPS) module and one polyketide synthase (PKS) module. The single PKS module functions in a non-canonical fashion in that it is an iterative type I PKS responsible for the generation of the two unique polyketides needed in the backbone of HSAF using malonyl-CoA as both the starter and extender unit, while the NRPS module is responsible for the linking of the polyketides to an L-ornithine unit and the initial cyclization to create the tetramate back bone. The coding region related to HSAF production contains a PKS-NRPS with a total of 9 domains, (KS-AT-DH-KR-ACP-C-A-PCP-TE), while a cascade of FAD-dependent redox reactions (OX1-OX4) flank the PKS-NRPS cluster proposed to be responsible for formation of the 5,5,6-tricyclic system, there are additional coding regions for a putative regulator, an arginase for L-ornithine production from Arginine, and a transporter which flank the PKS-NRPS.

Figure 1. Proposed mechanism of HSAF biosynthesis

Figure 2. Schematic of the function of the hybrid PKS-NRPS in the biosynthesis of HSAF
