= Wohlfahrtiimonas =

Scientific classification
- Domain: Bacteria
- Kingdom: Pseudomonadati
- Phylum: Pseudomonadota
- Class: Gammaproteobacteria
- Order: Lysobacterales
- Genus: Wohlfahrtiimonas; Tóth et al. 2008

Type species
- Wohlfahrtiimonas chitiniclastica

Species
- W. chitiniclastica W. larvae W. populi

Genus of bacteria

Wohlfahrtiimonas is a genus of bacteria from the class Gammaproteobacteria.

It was first described by Tóth et al. in 2008, and is named after its first described vector: the larvae of Wohlfahrtia magnifica, a species of parasitic fly. Other species of flies, such as Lucilia sericata, Chrysomya megacephala and Musca domestica have also been linked closely to the spread of Wohlfahrtiimonas, as human wounds that have been infected with fly larvae are breeding grounds for the bacteria. Other potential sources of transmission include soil and chicken meat.
