= Marinicella pacifica =

Scientific classification
- Domain: Bacteria
- Kingdom: Pseudomonadati
- Phylum: Pseudomonadota
- Class: Gammaproteobacteria
- Order: Lysobacterales
- Family: Marinicellaceae
- Genus: Marinicella
- Species: M. pacifica

Binomial name
- Marinicella pacifica Wang et al. 2016

Type strain
- CGMCC 1.12181, JCM 18208

Species of bacterium

Marinicella pacifica is a Gram-negative, strictly aerobic, rod-shaped and non-motile bacterium from the genus Marinicella which has been isolated from seawater from the South Pacific Gyre from the Pacific Ocean.
