= Katanosin =

Katanosin B

Names
- IUPAC name N-[6-(2-amino-1-hydroxy-2-oxoethyl)-15-butan-2-yl-18-[3-(diaminomethylideneamino)propyl]-12-(1-hydroxyethyl)-3-(hydroxymethyl)-24-(1-hydroxy-2-methylpropyl)-21-(2-methylpropyl)-2,5,8,11,14,17,20,23,26-nonaoxo-28-phenyl-1-oxa-4,7,10,13,16,19,22,25-octazacyclooctacos-27-yl]-2-[(2-amino-4-methylpentanoyl)amino]-4-methylpentanamide
- Other names Lysobactin

Identifiers
CAS Number	116340-02-4
3D model (JSmol)	Interactive image
ChemSpider	170823
MeSH	B Katanosin B
PubChem CID	197270
- InChI: InChI=1S/C58H97N15O17/c1-12-30(10)39-53(85)71-40(31(11)75)52(84)64-24-38(76)69-42(45(78)47(60)79)55(87)68-37(25-74)57(89)90-46(32-17-14-13-15-18-32)43(73-51(83)36(23-28(6)7)66-48(80)33(59)21-26(2)3)56(88)72-41(44(77)29(8)9)54(86)67-35(22-27(4)5)50(82)65-34(49(81)70-39)19-16-20-63-58(61)62/h13-15,17-18,26-31,33-37,39-46,74-75,77-78H,12,16,19-25,59H2,1-11H3,(H2,60,79)(H,64,84)(H,65,82)(H,66,80)(H,67,86)(H,68,87)(H,69,76)(H,70,81)(H,71,85)(H,72,88)(H,73,83)(H4,61,62,63) Key: KQMKBWMQSNKASI-UHFFFAOYSA-N; InChI=1/C58H97N15O17/c1-12-30(10)39-53(85)71-40(31(11)75)52(84)64-24-38(76)69-42(45(78)47(60)79)55(87)68-37(25-74)57(89)90-46(32-17-14-13-15-18-32)43(73-51(83)36(23-28(6)7)66-48(80)33(59)21-26(2)3)56(88)72-41(44(77)29(8)9)54(86)67-35(22-27(4)5)50(82)65-34(49(81)70-39)19-16-20-63-58(61)62/h13-15,17-18,26-31,33-37,39-46,74-75,77-78H,12,16,19-25,59H2,1-11H3,(H2,60,79)(H,64,84)(H,65,82)(H,66,80)(H,67,86)(H,68,87)(H,69,76)(H,70,81)(H,71,85)(H,72,88)(H,73,83)(H4,61,62,63) Key: KQMKBWMQSNKASI-UHFFFAOYAZ
- SMILES: O=C(N)C(O)C2C(=O)NC(C(=O)OC(c1ccccc1)C(C(=O)NC(C(=O)NC(C(=O)NC(C(=O)NC(C(=O)NC(C(=O)NCC(=O)N2)C(O)C)C(C)CC)CCCN=C(N)N)CC(C)C)C(O)C(C)C)NC(=O)C(NC(=O)C(N)CC(C)C)CC(C)C)CO

Properties
Chemical formula	C_{58}H_{97}N_{15}O_{17}
Molar mass	1276.502 g·mol^{−1}
Appearance	Solid
Density	1.42 g/cm^{3}

Hazards
- Occupational safety and health (OHS/OSH)
Main hazards	Xn
- Except where otherwise noted, data are given for materials in their standard state (at 25 °C [77 °F], 100 kPa). verify (what is ?) Infobox references

Katanosins are a group of antibiotics (also known as lysobactins). They are natural products with strong antibacterial potency. So far, katanosin A and katanosin B (lysobactin) have been described.

== Sources ==
Katanosins have been isolated from the fermentation broth of microorganisms, such as Cytophaga. or the Gram-negative bacterium Lysobacter sp.

== Structure ==
Katanosins are cyclic depsipeptides (acylcyclodepsipeptides). These non-proteinogenic structures are not ordinary proteins derived from primary metabolism. Rather, they originate from bacterial secondary metabolism. Accordingly, various non-proteinogenic (non-ribosomal) amino acids are found in katanosins, such as 3-hydroxyleucine, 3-hydroxyasparagine, allothreonine and 3-hydroxyphenylalanine. All katanosins have a cyclic and a linear segment (“lariat structure”). The peptidic ring is closed with an ester bond (lactone).

Katanosin A and B differ in the amino acid position 7. The minor metabolite katanosin A has a valine in this position, whereas the main metabolite katanosin B carries an isoleucine.

== Biological activity ==
Katanosin antibiotics target the bacterial cell wall biosynthesis. They are highly potent against problematic Gram-positive hospital pathogens such as staphylococci and enterococci. Their promising biological activity attracted various biological and chemical research groups. Their in-vitro potency is comparable with the current “last defence” antibiotic vancomycin.

== Chemical synthesis ==
The first total syntheses of katanosin B (lysobactin) have been described in 2007.
