= Steroidobacter agariperforans =

Scientific classification
- Domain: Bacteria
- Kingdom: Pseudomonadati
- Phylum: Pseudomonadota
- Class: Gammaproteobacteria
- Order: Nevskiales
- Family: Steroidobacteraceae
- Genus: Steroidobacter
- Species: S. agariperforans

Binomial name
- Steroidobacter agariperforans Sakai et al. 2014

Type strain
- JCM 18477, KCTC 32107, strain KA5-B

Species of bacterium

Steroidobacter agariperforans is a Gram-negative, aerobic, non-spore-forming and non-motile bacterium from the genus Steroidobacter.
