= Solimonas terrae =

Scientific classification
- Domain: Bacteria
- Kingdom: Pseudomonadati
- Phylum: Pseudomonadota
- Class: Gammaproteobacteria
- Order: Nevskiales
- Family: Nevskiaceae
- Genus: Solimonas
- Species: S. terrae

Binomial name
- Solimonas terrae Kim et al. 2014

Type strain
- DSM 27281, KACC 16967, KIS83-12

Species of bacterium

Solimonas terrae is a Gram-negative, aerobic, rod-shaped and motile bacterium from the genus Solimonas which has been isolated from soil from the Gaui Island from Korea.
