= Cyanobacterin =

Names
- Preferred IUPAC name (3R,4R,5Z)-3-[(7-Chloro-2H-1,3-benzodioxol-5-yl)methyl]-4-hydroxy-5-[(4-methoxyphenyl)methylidene]-4-(propan-2-yl)oxolan-2-one

Identifiers
CAS Number	80902-00-7
3D model (JSmol)	Interactive image
ChemSpider	4942365
PubChem CID	6437843
UNII	XVW5SZ8LXA
CompTox Dashboard (EPA)	DTXSID001018202
- InChI: InChI=1S/C23H23ClO6/c1-13(2)23(26)17(8-15-9-18(24)21-19(10-15)28-12-29-21)22(25)30-20(23)11-14-4-6-16(27-3)7-5-14/h4-7,9-11,13,17,26H,8,12H2,1-3H3/b20-11-/t17-,23+/m0/s1 Key: YYPUQBCQRSMSKU-YLBRSAIOSA-N
- SMILES: CC(C)[C@]\1([C@H](C(=O)O/C1=C\c2ccc(cc2)OC)Cc3cc4c(c(c3)Cl)OCO4)O

Properties
Chemical formula	C_{23}H_{23}ClO_{6}
Molar mass	430.88 g·mol^{−1}
- Except where otherwise noted, data are given for materials in their standard state (at 25 °C [77 °F], 100 kPa). Infobox references

Cyanobacterin is a chemical compound produced by the cyanobacteria Scytonema hofmanni. It is a photosynthesis inhibitor with algaecidal and herbicidal effects.
