= Lysobacter agri =

Scientific classification
- Domain: Bacteria
- Kingdom: Pseudomonadati
- Phylum: Pseudomonadota
- Class: Gammaproteobacteria
- Order: Lysobacterales
- Family: Lysobacteraceae
- Genus: Lysobacter
- Species: L. agri

Binomial name
- Lysobacter agri Singh et al. 2015

Type strain
- CSCTCC AB 2015126, KACC 18283, THG-SKA3

Species of bacterium

Lysobacter agri is a Gram-positive, rod-shaped, aerobic and motile bacterium from the genus of Lysobacter which has been isolated from soil from a field in the Kyung Hee University in Korea.
