= Hydrocarboniphaga daqingensis =

Scientific classification
- Domain: Bacteria
- Kingdom: Pseudomonadati
- Phylum: Pseudomonadota
- Class: Gammaproteobacteria
- Order: Nevskiales
- Family: Nevskiaceae
- Genus: Hydrocarboniphaga
- Species: H. daqingensis

Binomial name
- Hydrocarboniphaga daqingensis Liu et al. 2011

Type strain
- CGMCC 1.7049, NBRC 104238, strain B2-9

Species of bacterium

Hydrocarboniphaga daqingensis is a heterotrophic and aerobic bacterium from the genus Hydrocarboniphaga which has been isolated from water from the Longhu Lake in Daqing in China.
