= L-allo-threonine aldolase =

Identifiers
- EC no.: 4.1.2.49

Databases
- IntEnz: IntEnz view
- BRENDA: BRENDA entry
- ExPASy: NiceZyme view
- KEGG: KEGG entry
- MetaCyc: metabolic pathway
- PRIAM: profile
- PDB structures: RCSB PDB PDBe PDBsum
Search
- PMC: articles
- PubMed: articles
- NCBI: proteins

L-allo-threonine aldolase (GLY1, EC 4.1.2.49) is an enzyme catalyzing the conversion between L-allo-threonine (unusual stereoisomer) on one side and glycine plus acetaldehyde on another side. Artificial disabling (knockout) of this enzyme in wild bacteria has no significant effect. However such disabling suppresses the growth of mutants that already lack other enzyme, serine hydroxymethyltransferase. Hence L-allo-threonine aldolase provides the alternative pathway for cellular glycine when serine hydroxymethyltransferase is inert. E.coli L-allo-threonine aldolase is a highly termostable enzyme (survives 60 degrees C), this can be used for purification.

The enzyme is specific for L-allothreonine and can not act on the more common L-threonine. It is different from EC 4.1.2.5 (L-threonine aldolase) and EC 4.1.2.48 (less specific enzyme that acts on both L-threonine and L-allothreonine). A previously listed enzyme with highly similar name (allothreonine aldolase, past EC 4.1.2.6), was deleted in 1971 after it was found to be identical to EC 2.1.2.1.

This enzyme may also present in animals and plants, including mouse.
