= Nevskia ramosa =

Scientific classification
- Domain: Bacteria
- Kingdom: Pseudomonadati
- Phylum: Pseudomonadota
- Class: Gammaproteobacteria
- Order: Nevskiales
- Family: Nevskiaceae
- Genus: Nevskia
- Species: N. ramosa

Binomial name
- Nevskia ramosa Famintsyn 1892

Type strain
- DSM 11499

Synonyms
- "Gallionella ramosa" (Famintzin 1892) Krasil'nikov 1949

Species of bacterium

Nevskia ramosa is a mesophilic proteobacterium from the genus Nevskia. Famintsyn first described it in 1892 from a sample of a botanical garden's aquarium water in St. Petersburg, Russia. Typically, its microcolonies resemble characteristic flat rosettes with a bush-like appearance on the surface of water. It has been isolated from a bog lake in Greifswald, Germany.
