= Nevskia aquatilis =

Scientific classification
- Domain: Bacteria
- Kingdom: Pseudomonadati
- Phylum: Pseudomonadota
- Class: Gammaproteobacteria
- Order: Nevskiales
- Family: Nevskiaceae
- Genus: Nevskia
- Species: N. aquatilis

Binomial name
- Nevskia aquatilis Leandro et al. 2013

Type strain
- CECT 7897, LMG 26345, F2-178, F2-63

Species of bacterium

Nevskia aquatilis is an aerobic, rod-shaped and non-motile bacterium from the genus of Nevskia which has been isolated from water from an aquifer in Portugal.
