= Wohlfahrtiimonas populi =

Scientific classification
- Domain: Bacteria
- Kingdom: Pseudomonadati
- Phylum: Pseudomonadota
- Class: Gammaproteobacteria
- Order: Lysobacterales
- Genus: Wohlfahrtiimonas
- Species: W. populi

Binomial name
- Wohlfahrtiimonas populi Li et al. 2017

Type strain
- CFCC 12747, KCTC 52796, 34C10-3-10

Species of bacterium

Wohlfahrtiimonas populi is a Gram-negative, facultatively anaerobic and motile bacterium from the genus of Wohlfahrtiimonas which has been isolated from tree Populus × euramericana.
