= Lysobacter arseniciresistens =

Scientific classification
- Domain: Bacteria
- Kingdom: Pseudomonadati
- Phylum: Pseudomonadota
- Class: Gammaproteobacteria
- Order: Lysobacterales
- Family: Lysobacteraceae
- Genus: Lysobacter
- Species: L. arseniciresistens

Binomial name
- Lysobacter arseniciresistens Luo et al. 2012

Type strain
- CGMCC 1.10752, KCTC 23365, strain ZS79

Species of bacterium

Lysobacter arseniciresistens is a Gram-positive, rod-shaped, aerobic, arsenite-resistant and motile bacterium from the genus of Lysobacter which has been isolated from soil from an iron mine in Daye in China.
