= Alpha-lytic endopeptidase =

Identifiers
- EC no.: 3.4.21.12
- CAS no.: 37288-76-9

Databases
- BRENDA: enzyme data
- ExPASy: NiceZyme view
- KEGG: enzyme entry
- MetaCyc: metabolic pathway
- Rhea: reactions
- PDB structures: RCSB PDB PDBe PDBsum
Search
- PMC: articles
- PubMed: articles
- NCBI: proteins

Alpha-lytic endopeptidase or Alpha-lytic protease (EC 3.4.21.12, myxobacter alpha-lytic proteinase, alpha-lytic proteinase, alpha-lytic protease, Mycobacterium sorangium alpha-lytic proteinase, Myxobacter 495 alpha-lytic proteinase) is an enzyme isolated from the myxobacterium Lysobacter enzymogenes. This enzyme is a serine protease that catalyses the breakage of peptide bonds using a hydrolysis chemical reaction. Alpha-lytic protease was named based on the observed cleavage specificity for the α position of the tetrapeptide component in gram-positive bacterial cell walls (alanine). Alpha-lytic protease is also capable of digesting elastin and other proteins.

This protease was recently applied to proteome digestion for production of peptides for mass spectrometry-based proteomics, where it was found to cleave preferentially after several small amino acids, including alanine, serine, threonine, valine, and to a lesser extent, methionine. This specificity is very different than the most commonly used protease for proteomics, trypsin, which cleaves only after arginine and lysine.

Alpha-lytic protease was also recently reported to find utility as part of a method to map endogenous SUMO modification sites in the proteome.
