= Marinicella sediminis =

Scientific classification
- Domain: Bacteria
- Kingdom: Pseudomonadati
- Phylum: Pseudomonadota
- Class: Gammaproteobacteria
- Order: Lysobacterales
- Family: Marinicellaceae
- Genus: Marinicella
- Species: M. sediminis

Binomial name
- Marinicella sediminis Wang et al. 2018

Type strain
- KCTC 42953, MCCC 1H00149

Species of bacterium

Marinicella sediminis is a Gram-negative, aerobic, non-spore-forming, rod-shaped, heterotrophic and non-motile bacterium from the genus Marinicella which has been isolated from sediments from the coast of Weihai in China.
