= Steroidobacter denitrificans =

Scientific classification
- Domain: Bacteria
- Kingdom: Pseudomonadati
- Phylum: Pseudomonadota
- Class: Gammaproteobacteria
- Order: Nevskiales
- Family: Steroidobacteraceae
- Genus: Steroidobacter
- Species: S. denitrificans

Binomial name
- Steroidobacter denitrificans Fahrbach et al. 2008

Type strain
- DSM 18526, JCM 14622, FS-2007, strain FS

Species of bacterium

Steroidobacter denitrificans is a Gram-negative and motile bacterium from the genus Steroidobacter which has been isolated from anoxic sewage sludge from Soers in Germany. Steroidobacter denitrificans has the ability to degrade steroid hormones.
