= Hydrocarboniphaga effusa =

Scientific classification
- Domain: Bacteria
- Kingdom: Pseudomonadati
- Phylum: Pseudomonadota
- Class: Gammaproteobacteria
- Order: Nevskiales
- Family: Nevskiaceae
- Genus: Hydrocarboniphaga
- Species: H. effusa

Binomial name
- Hydrocarboniphaga effusa Palleroni et al. 2004

Type strain
- ATCC BAA-332, DSM 16095, strain AP103

Synonyms
- Hydrocarbophaga diffusa Hydrocarbophaga effusa

Species of bacterium

Hydrocarboniphaga effusa is a bacterium from the genus Hydrocarboniphaga which has been isolated from soil from New Jersey in the United States.
