= Wohlfahrtiimonas larvae =

Scientific classification
- Domain: Bacteria
- Kingdom: Pseudomonadati
- Phylum: Pseudomonadota
- Class: Gammaproteobacteria
- Order: Lysobacterales
- Genus: Wohlfahrtiimonas
- Species: W. larvae

Binomial name
- Wohlfahrtiimonas larvae Lee et al. 2014

Type strain
- JCM 18424, KACC 16839, KBL006

Species of bacterium

Wohlfahrtiimonas larvae is a Gram-negative, facultatively anaerobic and motile bacterium from the genus of Wohlfahrtiimonas which has been isolated from the gut of the larva Hermetia illucens.
