= Solimonas aquatica =

Scientific classification
- Domain: Bacteria
- Kingdom: Pseudomonadati
- Phylum: Pseudomonadota
- Class: Gammaproteobacteria
- Order: Nevskiales
- Family: Nevskiaceae
- Genus: Solimonas
- Species: S. aquatica

Binomial name
- Solimonas aquatica Sheu et al. 2011

Type strain
- BCRC 17835, DSM 25927, LMG 24500, NAA16

Species of bacterium

Solimonas aquatica is a Gram-negative, aerobic, rod-shaped, non-spore-forming and motile bacterium from the genus Solimonas which has been isolated from a water spring from Kaohsiung in Taiwan.
