= Marinicella litoralis =

Scientific classification
- Domain: Bacteria
- Kingdom: Pseudomonadati
- Phylum: Pseudomonadota
- Class: Gammaproteobacteria
- Order: Lysobacterales
- Family: Marinicellaceae
- Genus: Marinicella
- Species: M. litoralis

Binomial name
- Marinicella litoralis Romanenko et al. 2010

Type strain
- JCM 16154, KMM 3900, NRIC 0758

Species of bacterium

Marinicella litoralis is a Gram-negative, aerobic, stenohaline, rod-shaped and non-motile bacterium from the genus Marinicella which has been isolated from seawater from the Sea of Japan in Russia.
