= Lysobacter aestuarii =

Scientific classification
- Domain: Bacteria
- Kingdom: Pseudomonadati
- Phylum: Pseudomonadota
- Class: Gammaproteobacteria
- Order: Lysobacterales
- Family: Lysobacteraceae
- Genus: Lysobacter
- Species: L. aestuarii

Binomial name
- Lysobacter aestuarii Jeong et al. 2016

Type strain
- JCM 31130, KACC 18502, strain S2-C

Species of bacterium

Lysobacter aestuarii is a Gram-positive and rod-shaped bacterium from the genus of Lysobacter which has been isolated from tidal flat sediments.
