= Solimonas variicoloris =

Scientific classification
- Domain: Bacteria
- Kingdom: Pseudomonadati
- Phylum: Pseudomonadota
- Class: Gammaproteobacteria
- Order: Nevskiales
- Family: Nevskiaceae
- Genus: Solimonas
- Species: S. variicoloris

Binomial name
- Solimonas variicoloris (Friedrich and Lipski 2008) Sheu et al. 2011

Type strain
- DSM 15731, LMG 22844, strain MN28

Synonyms
- Singularimonas variicoloris Friedrich and Lipski 2008; "Sinobacter variicoloris" (Friedrich and Lipski 2008) Xu et al. 2011

Species of bacterium

Solimonas variicoloris is a Gram-negative, rod-shaped and non-spore forming bacterium belonging to the genus Solimonas. It was first isolated from a hexane-degrading biofilter near Hamm, Germany.

The species was initially described as Singularimonas variicoloris at the time of discovery, and later revised to Solimonas variicoloris upon analysis of 16S rRNA gene sequence similarity to Solimonas soli.
