= Steroidobacter flavus =

Scientific classification
- Domain: Bacteria
- Kingdom: Pseudomonadati
- Phylum: Pseudomonadota
- Class: Gammaproteobacteria
- Order: Nevskiales
- Family: Steroidobacteraceae
- Genus: Steroidobacter
- Species: S. flavus

Binomial name
- Steroidobacter flavus

Type strain
- CGMCC 1.10759, CPCC 100154, DSM 23339

Species of bacterium

Steroidobacter flavus is a microcystin-degrading bacterium from the genus of Steroidobacter which has been isolated from forest soil from the Hainan Island in China.
