= Amylibacter kogurei =

Amylibacter cionae

Scientific classification
- Domain: Bacteria
- Kingdom: Pseudomonadati
- Phylum: Pseudomonadota
- Class: Alphaproteobacteria
- Order: Rhodobacterales
- Family: Rhodobacteraceae
- Genus: Amylibacter
- Species: A. kogurei

Binomial name
- Amylibacter kogurei Wong et al. 2018

Type strain
- 4G11

Species of bacterium

Amylibacter kogurei is a Gram-negative bacterium from the genus of Amylibacter.
