= Kordia algicida =

Scientific classification
- Domain: Bacteria
- Kingdom: Pseudomonadati
- Phylum: Bacteroidota
- Class: Flavobacteriia
- Order: Flavobacteriales
- Family: Flavobacteriaceae
- Genus: Kordia
- Species: K. algicida

Binomial name
- Kordia algicida Sohn et al. 2004

Type strain
- OT-1

Bacterium

Kordia algicida is an algicidal, Gram-negative, strictly aerobic and non-motile bacterium from the genus Kordia which has been isolated from sea water from the Masan Bay in Korea. The species requires sodium chloride for growth. K. algicida is catalase-positive and oxidase-negative.
