= Kordia zosterae =

Scientific classification
- Domain: Bacteria
- Kingdom: Pseudomonadati
- Phylum: Bacteroidota
- Class: Flavobacteriia
- Order: Flavobacteriales
- Family: Flavobacteriaceae
- Genus: Kordia
- Species: K. zosterae

Binomial name
- Kordia zosterae Kim et al. 2017

Type strain
- ZO2-23

Bacterium

Kordia zosterae is a Gram-negative and rod-shaped bacterium from the genus of Kordia which has been isolated from the seaweed Zostera marina from the Yellow Sea in Korea.
