= Rhodanobacter =

Scientific classification
- Domain: Bacteria
- Kingdom: Pseudomonadati
- Phylum: Pseudomonadota
- Class: Gammaproteobacteria
- Order: Lysobacterales
- Family: Rhodanobacteraceae
- Genus: Rhodanobacter; Nalin et al. 1999

Type species
- Rhodanobacter lindaniclasticus

Species
- R. aciditrophus R. caeni R. denitrificans R. fulvus R. ginsengisoli R. ginsenosidimutans R. glycinis R. humi R. koreensis R. lindaniclasticus R. panaciterrae R. rhizosphaerae R. soli R. spathiphylli R. terrae R. thiooxydans R. umsongensis

Synonyms
- Swingiella, Swingsiella

Genus of bacteria

Rhodanobacter is a Gram-negative and non-motile genus of Pseudomonadota.
