= Pseudofulvimonas =

Scientific classification
- Domain: Bacteria
- Kingdom: Pseudomonadati
- Phylum: Pseudomonadota
- Class: Gammaproteobacteria
- Order: Lysobacterales
- Family: Rhodanobacteraceae
- Genus: Pseudofulvimonas; Kämpfer et al. 2010

Type species
- Pseudofulvimonas gallinarii

Species
- P. gallinarii

Genus of bacteria

Pseudofulvimonas is a Gram-negative and rod-shaped genus of Pseudomonadota with one known species (Pseudofulvimonas gallinarii). Pseudofulvimonas gallinarii has been isolated from air from a duck barn.
