= Steroidobacter =

Scientific classification
- Domain: Bacteria
- Kingdom: Pseudomonadati
- Phylum: Pseudomonadota
- Class: Gammaproteobacteria
- Order: Nevskiales
- Family: Steroidobacteraceae
- Genus: Steroidobacter; Fahrbach et al. 2008

Type species
- Steroidobacter denitrificans Fahrbach et al. 2008

Species
- Steroidobacter agariperforans Steroidobacter denitrificans Steroidobacter flavus

Genus of bacteria

Steroidobacter is a genus of bacteria from the family of Steroidobacteraceae.
