= Dokdonella =

Scientific classification
- Domain: Bacteria
- Kingdom: Pseudomonadati
- Phylum: Pseudomonadota
- Class: Gammaproteobacteria
- Order: Lysobacterales
- Family: Rhodanobacteraceae
- Genus: Dokdonella; Yoon et al. 2006

Type species
- Dokdonella koreensis

Species
- D. fugitiva D. ginsengisoli D. immobilis D. koreensis D. kunshanensis D. soli

Genus of bacteria

Dokdonella is a genus of bacteria from the family of Rhodanobacteraceae. Dokdonella is named after the island Dokdo.
