= Marinicella =

Scientific classification
- Domain: Bacteria
- Kingdom: Pseudomonadati
- Phylum: Pseudomonadota
- Class: Gammaproteobacteria
- Order: Lysobacterales
- Family: Marinicellaceae; Chuvochina et al. 2024
- Genus: Marinicella; Romanenko et al. 2010

Type species
- Marinicella litoralis

Species
- Marinicella gelatinilytica Marinicella litoralis Marinicella marina Marinicella meishanensis Marinicella pacifica Marinicella rhabdoformis Marinicella sediminis

Genus of bacteria

Ignatzschineria is a genus of gram-negative bacteria from the class Gammaproteobacteria.
