= Solimonas soli =

Scientific classification
- Domain: Bacteria
- Kingdom: Pseudomonadati
- Phylum: Pseudomonadota
- Class: Gammaproteobacteria
- Order: Nevskiales
- Family: Nevskiaceae
- Genus: Solimonas
- Species: S. soli

Binomial name
- Solimonas soli Kim et al. 2007

Type strain
- DSM 21787, KCTC 12834, LMG 24014, strain DCY12

Synonyms
- Sinobacter soli

Species of bacterium

Solimonas soli is a Gram-negative and non-motile bacterium from the genus Solimonas which has been isolated from soil from a ginseng field in Korea.
