= Algaecide =

For killing and preventing the growth of algae

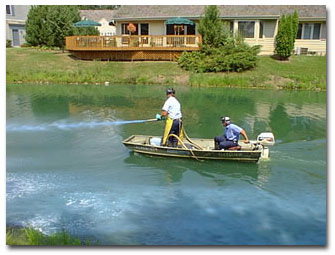
Spraying algicide into a pond

Algaecide or algicide is a biocide used for killing and preventing the growth of algae, often defined in a loose sense that, beyond the biological definition, also includes cyanobacteria ("blue-green algae"). An algaecide may be used for controlled bodies of water (reservoirs, golf ponds, swimming pools), but may also be used on land for locations such as turfgrass.

== Types ==
=== Inorganic compounds ===
Some inorganic compounds are known since antiquity for their algicidal action due to their simplicity.

- Copper(II) sulfate remains "the most effective algicidal treatment". A related traditional use is the Bordeaux mixture, used to control fungus on fruits.
- Hydrated lime, as a biocide, is allowed in the production of organic foods.

=== Barley straw ===
Barley straw, in the United Kingdom, is placed in mesh bags and floated in fish ponds or water gardens to help reduce algal growth without harming pond plants and animals. Barley straw has not been approved by the United States Environmental Protection Agency (EPA) for use as a pesticide and its effectiveness as an algaecide in ponds has produced mixed results during university testing in the United States and the United Kingdom. It is unclear how straw actually works.

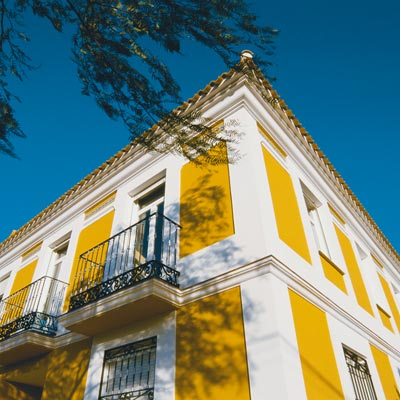
Algicidal and fungicidal paint applied to a building

=== Synthetic algicides ===
Synthetic algicides include:

- Benzalkonium chloride – "quat" disinfectant that attacks membranes
- Bethoxazin – "new broad spectrum industrial microbicide" in 2012, noted as "Canceled in U.S." in 2022 PubChem-EPA query
- Cybutryne – banned since 2023 in ship paint
- Dichlone – quinone fungicide/algaecide, not persistent in soil
- Dichlorophen – also kills invertebrate animals and bacteria
- Diuron – herbicide/algaecide, inhibits photosynthesis
- Endothal – herbicide/algaecide, inhibits protein phosphatase 2A
- Fentin – quinone fungicide/algaecide, discontinued
- Isoproturon – selective substituted urea herbicide, discontinued
- Methabenzthiazuron – substituted urea herbicide, discontinued
- Nabam – fungicide/algicide discontinued in the EU over cancer
- Oxyfluorfen – herbicide, "very toxic to aquatic life with long lasting effects"
- Pentachlorophenyl laurate
- Quinoclamine – herbicide/algicide, not used in most of the EU
- Quinonamid
- Simazine – herbicide/algaecide, inhibits photosynthesis
- Terbutryn
- Tiodonium

== Algicidal Bacteria ==
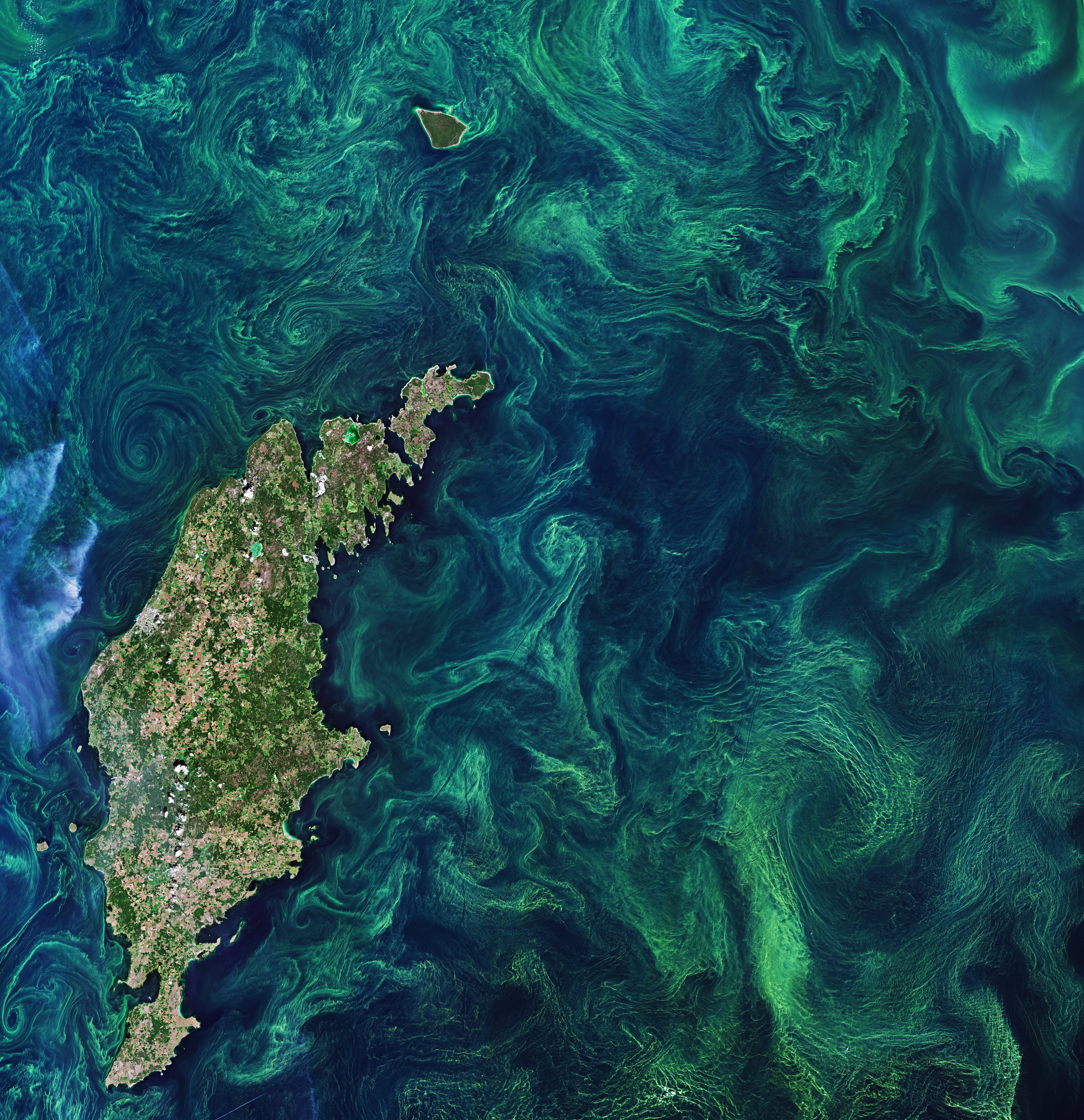
Algae bloom in the Baltic Sea

Algicidal bacteria are a diverse group of bacteria that either directly or indirectly inhibit the growth of algae. They play a key role in maintaining ecological stability in fresh water and marine environments by mitigating the negative effects of harmful algal blooms (HAB). Algicidal bacteria interactions with algal cells can be broadly split into two categories: direct and indirect. Direct methods typically involve the algicidal bacteria physically attacking the algal cell to induce cell lysis. Indirect methods of attack by algicidal bacteria typically involve releasing algae inhibiting chemicals into the surrounding water.

Algicidal bacteria can detect targeted algal cells via chemotaxis and quorum sensing. Different species of algicidal bacteria can have varying degrees of specificity and many have co-evolved along their target algae.

Algicidal bacteria have been used as a biological control method against HABs. They tend to be more environmentally friendly than traditional algicides.

== Effects of Algicidal Bacteria on Algae ==
Algicidal bacteria can cause harm to algae in multiple different ways. Depending on the type of algae and type of bacteria, the mechanisms and resulting effects can vary.

=== Cell integrity loss ===
Cell integrity loss is caused by bacteria releasing dissolved algicidal compounds, which are toxic to algae, into the surrounding water, causing rapid cell lysis of algae cells. Cell lysis occurs when algicidal enzymes or small molecules degrade cell walls and membranes, causing structural collapse. While most compounds released by algicidal bacteria cause cell lysis by damaging the algae cells walls, other lysis inducing mechanisms can include ion permeability disruption, and acidification of the cytoplasm by small molecules passing through the cell wall.

An example of a bacterium which causes cell integrity loss is a strain of Alteromonas abrolhosensis, named JY‑JZ1, which when cultured, showed strong algicidal activity. Through microscopy, researchers found that algal cells exposed to this bacterium had damaged cell membranes and leaked intracellular contents which indicates cell death by lysis.

=== Photosynthesis impairment ===
Chemical structure of the compound 4-BP

Photosynthesis impairment occurs when bacteria release toxins that disrupt photosynthetic electron transport, lowering energy production and weakening algae cells. A specific example includes the production of 3,3′,5,5′‑tetrabromo‑2,2′‑biphenyldiol (4‑BP), which is a small molecule secreted by a certain strain of marine bacteria called Gammaproteobacteria. The algicidal effect of 4‑BP occurs due to interference with plastoquinone synthesis, which is a key molecule in the photosynthetic electron transport chain of phytoplankton. 4‑BP competitively binds to the active site of the enzyme responsible for plastoquinone synthesis, blocking its function and disrupting the phytoplankton's ability to photosynthesize. This disruption causes pigment loss, reduces photosynthetic efficiency, and leads to cell damage or death (lysis). This algicidal compound has been found to kill a range of different phytoplankton, including diatoms, chlorophytes, dinoflagellates and cyanobacteria.

=== Oxidative stress ===
Many algicides produced by bacteria increase reactive oxygen species (ROS), which are highly reactive molecules produced during cell processes such as photosynthesis and respiration inside algal cells. This damages DNA, proteins, and lipids, due to an oxidative chain reaction which produces toxic products that lead to cell death. Algal cells can usually counteract these elevated ROS levels with antioxidants, however excessive or prolonged ROS levels can overwhelm the cell and lead to its death. Oxidative stress can be detected in algae based on elevated levels of malondialdehyde (MDA), which is a marker of lipid peroxidation (where lipids are attacked by oxidants), as well as elevated levels of antioxidants and defence enzymes.

=== Calcium signalling disruption ===
Calcium ions (Ca²⁺) are essential signalling molecules for important cell functions such as membrane stability, cell growth and metabolism. Some algicidal bacterial compounds disrupt intracellular Ca²⁺ balance by causing unusual increases in Ca²⁺ levels. These heightened levels trigger signalling chains that eventually lead to cell death.

== Mechanisms of Algicidal Bacteria ==
Various mechanisms are employed by bacteria to facilitate their algicidal processes. There are two established methods of algicidal activity: direct and indirect. However, some bacteria are capable of both. Some of these mechanisms are enhanced under different environmental conditions, such as varying nutrient availability.

=== Direct algicidal mechanisms ===
Direct algicidal mechanisms include methods in which bacterial cells physically interact with algal cells. For example, Streptomyces globisporus strain G9 utilizes hyphae to entrap Microcystis aeruginosa, shading the phytoplankton from sunlight, causing photoinhibition. Another example is compound production triggered by direct cell contact. For instance, Chitinimonas prasina strain LY03 attaches to diatoms that contain chitin in their cell walls directed by their bacterial flagellum, and then produce chitinases that cause diatom lysis. In some instances, locally concentrated compounds have to reach specific levels in order to become algicidal.

=== Indirect algicidal mechanisms ===
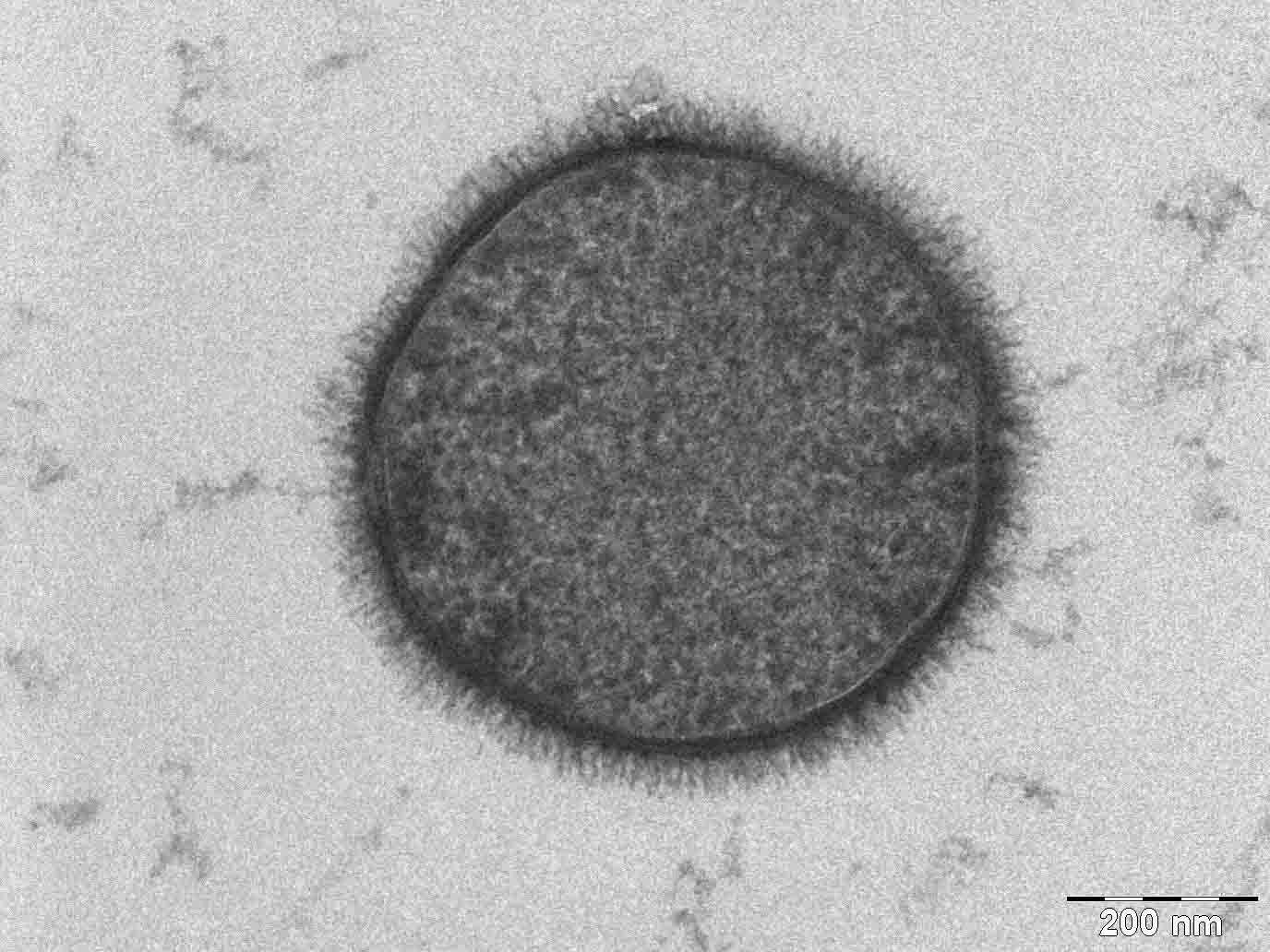
Algicidal bacteria Bacillus subtilis

Indirect algicidal mechanisms involve no physical contact. Instead, bacteria secrete compounds into the environment that result in the death of algal cells. There is a wide variety of chemical compounds that may have algicidal capabilities, including alkaloids, amino acids, peptides, proteins, carbohydrates, lipids, enzymes, polyketides, terpenoids, and fatty acids. Secretion can be constitutive, in which chemicals are released continuously, or inducible, in which the detection of other molecules or cells trigger their release. There is also evidence that algicidal chemicals act additively. For example, ortho-tyrosine and urocanic acid, both produced by Bacillus sp. B1, had algicidal effects on Heterosigma akashiwo, where ortho-tyrosine affected its photosynthetic system, and urocanic acid damaged its mitochondria.

=== Regulation of algicidal activity ===
To perform algicidal processes, bacteria require mechanisms to detect and regulate their responses. Some common bacterial mechanisms associated with algicidal activities include chemotaxis, attachment and biofilm formation, and quorum sensing.

==== Chemotaxis ====
Chemotaxis is the ability to direct movement through sensing a gradient of chemoattractants or chemorepellents using flagella, allowing bacteria to locate algal cells to lyse. Some algal cells can have intrinsic attractant properties, whereas others produce attractants. A common chemoattractant is dimethylsulfoniopropionate (DMSP). Additionally, chemotaxis allows for preferential "predation", as some organisms may prefer specific attractants. For instance, amino acids tend to be preferentially taken up by Polaribacter marinivivus and Lentibacter algarum, whereas nucleotides are preferentially taken up by Litoricola marina.

==== Attachment and biofilm formation ====
Attachment is another important method for regulating algicidal activity, as it can elongate the duration of interactions between bacteria and algae. It was observed that the number of attached bacteria per diatom was positively correlated with the lysis rate of algal cells, and the lysis rate increased when attachment rates were elevated. Attachment can be strengthened through biofilm formation, which consists of extracellular polymeric substances (EPS), adhesins, and other components capable of aggregating cells together. Biofilms allow for elongated interactions between bacteria and algal cells, and maintain the exchange of nutrients and gases.

==== Quorum sensing ====
Quorum sensing is a method that depends on detecting cell or molecule densities to trigger specific responses. As cell density increases, signalling molecule concentrations also increase, eventually reaching a threshold that activates a response. This mechanism is useful to lower functioning costs for bacteria, as this allows high-energy responses to only occur when they are triggered as necessary by the signalling molecule. Known signalling molecules observed in algicidal responses include acyl-homoserine lactones (AHLs), quinolones, and diketopiperazines. Taxa such as Pseudomonas sp., Pseudoalteromonas sp., Vibrio sp., and Alteromonas sp. all demonstrate algicidal activity linked to quorum sensing mechanisms.

== Coevolution ==
Coevolution is the long-term outcome of the algae-bacteria interaction. Algae and bacteria interact through mutualism, competition, and antagonistic interactions. Bacteria have evolved mechanisms to utilize algal organic matter or lyse algal cells, while algae have developed defence mechanisms such as resting stages, induced resistance, and chemical signalling responses. This reciprocal adaptation is an evolutionary arms race between algae and bacteria.

== Specificity ==
Algicidal activity can be highly strain-specific and sometimes appears random or unexplained. Current studies have found that particle-associated bacteria tend to have broader algicidal activity, while free-living bacteria are often more species-specific. Algicidal bacteria with low host specificity may occupy a broader ecological niche as they can interact with and utilize organic matter from multiple algal species. However, highly specific bacteria may be more efficient in targeting particular algal hosts. Specificity does not necessarily determine bacterial abundance, but rather reflects different ecological strategies such as generalist versus specialist lifestyles.

== Algal Defence ==
=== Evasive strategies ===
Algae may resist algicidal bacteria through evasive strategies, such as forming morphologically distinct resting stages. These resting stages can help algae avoid direct contact with algicidal bacteria and survive unfavourable conditions. When the conditions improve, the resting stages can germinate and re-establish growing populations.

=== Induced resistance ===
Induced resistance is another mechanism that algae develop to defend against algicidal bacteria. One example, Chaetoceros didymus, was found to be resistant to the algicidal bacterium Kordia algicida by producing its own proteases. These proteases are believed to counteract the lytic enzymes produced by the bacteria. Such a resistance response can be triggered not only by direct contact with bacteria but also by chemical signals present in bacterial culture filtrates.

== Applications ==
=== Biological control of harmful algal blooms (HABs) ===
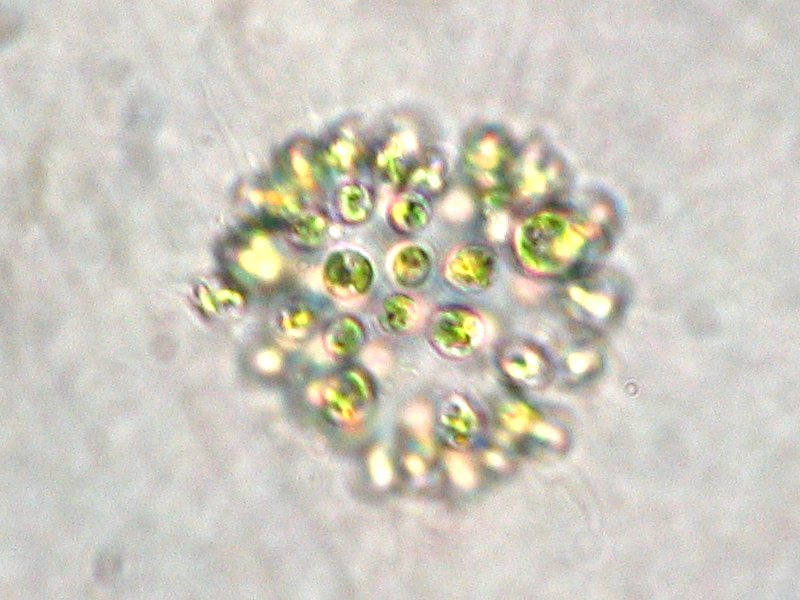
Micocystis aeruginosa. Can form harmful algae blooms

Harmful effects on the ecosystem caused by HABs include water deoxygenation, production of toxins that deter competing species and grazers. Certain species of algae have been observed to produce paralytic toxins targeting shellfish which can greatly disrupt coastal ecosystems as well as commercial fisheries.

Algicidal bacteria have been studied as biological control agents for inhibiting the formation of harmful algal blooms. They may also help protect aquaculture operations, improve water treatment processes, and contribute to the restoration of phytoplankton community balance in aquatic ecosystems.

=== Antifouling material for industry ===
Some algicidal bacterial species produce bioactive compounds that have potential applications in antifouling coatings for ship hulls and aquaculture facilities. These compounds can inhibit the growth and attachment of algae and other microorganisms on submerged surfaces, reducing biofouling. They are still under investigation and can potentially be an environmentally friendly alternative to the traditional chemical anti-fouling paints.

== Taxonomy ==
Table 1. Target algae species and corresponding algicidal bacteria
Target Algae	Algicidal Bacteria
Unicellular Cyanobacteria
Microcystis sp.	Achromobacter, Acinetobacter, Aeromonas, Agrobacterium, Aquimarina, Bacillus, Brevibacillus, Brevundimonas, Chryseobacterium, Cytophaga, Enterobacter, Exiguobacterium, Halobacillus, Leuconostoc, Lysobacter, Morganella, Ochrobactrum, Paenibacillus, Paucibacter, Pedobacter, Pseudomonas, Raoultella, Rhizobium, Rhodococcus, Serratia, Saprospira, Stenotrophomonas, Streptomyces, Xanthobacter
Chroococcus sp.	Aeromonas, Bacillus, Chryseobacterium, Exiguobacterium
Fillamentus Cyanobacteria
Anabaea sp	Pseudomonas, Serratia, Streptomyces, Bacillus, Aeromonas, Lysobacter, Rhodococcus, Cytophaga
Leptolyngbya sp.	Pseudomonas, Bacillus, Exiguobacterium, Streptomyces
Nostoc sp.	Aeromonas, Bacillus, Chryseobacterium, Enterobacter, Exiguobacterium, Flexibacter, Pseudomonas, Stenotrophomonas, Streptomyces
Oscillatoria sp.	Bacillus, Myxococcus, Streptomyces, Pseudomonas, Aquimarina
Phormidium sp.	Streptomyces, Pseudomonas, Lysobacter
Pseudanabaena sp.	Streptomyces, Pseudomonas, Lysobacter
Unicellular Green Algae
Chlamydomonas sp.	Aeromonas, Aquimarina, Bacillus, Exiguobacterium, Chryseobacterium, Stenotrophomonas
Chlorella sp.	Bacillus, Aeromonas, Aquimarina, Bowmanella, Enterobacter, Flammeovirga, Flavobacterium, Microbacterium, Pseudomonas, Stenotrophomonas, Streptomyces, Deinococcus
Scenedesmus sp.	Microbacterium, Aeromonas, Enterobacter, Pseudomonas, Bacillus
Fillamentus Green Algae
Spirogyra sp.	Bacillus
Diatom
Ulnaria	Brevundimonas, Sphingomonas, Agrobacterium, Methylobacterium, Acinetobacter, Bacillus, Deinococcus
