= Wohlfahrtiimonas chitiniclastica =

Scientific classification
- Domain: Bacteria
- Kingdom: Pseudomonadati
- Phylum: Pseudomonadota
- Class: Gammaproteobacteria
- Order: Lysobacterales
- Genus: Wohlfahrtiimonas
- Species: W. chitiniclastica

Binomial name
- Wohlfahrtiimonas chitiniclastica Tóth et al. 2008

Type strain
- CCM 7401, DSM 18708, strain S5

Synonyms
- Ignatzschineria massiliensis

Species of bacterium

Wohlfahrtiimonas chitiniclastica is a bacterium from the genus of Wohlfahrtiimonas which has been first isolated from the larva of Wohlfahrtia magnifica from Budapest in Hungary. Wohlfahrtiimonas chitiniclastica can cause sepsis in rare cases.
