= Dyella =

Scientific classification
- Domain: Bacteria
- Kingdom: Pseudomonadati
- Phylum: Pseudomonadota
- Class: Gammaproteobacteria
- Order: Lysobacterales
- Family: Rhodanobacteraceae
- Genus: Dyella; Xie and Yokota 2005

Type species
- Dyella japonica

Species
- D. agri D. caseinilytica D. flava D. ginsengisoli D. halodurans D. humi D. japonica D. jejuensis D. jiangningensis D. koreensis D. kyungheensis D. lipolytica D. marensis D. mobilis D. soli D. terrae D. thiooxydans

Genus of bacteria

Dyella is a genus of bacteria from the family of Rhodanobacteraceae. Dyella is named after the New Zealand microbiologist Douglas W. Dye.
