= Rudaea =

Scientific classification
- Domain: Bacteria
- Kingdom: Pseudomonadati
- Phylum: Pseudomonadota
- Class: Gammaproteobacteria
- Order: Lysobacterales
- Family: Rhodanobacteraceae
- Genus: Rudaea; Weon et al. 2009

Type species
- Rudaea cellulosilytica

Species
- R. cellulosilytica

Genus of bacteria

Rudaea is a Gram-negative, aerobic and rod-shaped genus of Pseudomonadota from the family of Rhodanobacteraceae with one known species (Rudaea cellulosilytica). Rudaea cellulosilytica has been isolated from soil from the Daechung Island in Korea.
