= Fulvimonas =

Scientific classification
- Domain: Bacteria
- Kingdom: Pseudomonadati
- Phylum: Pseudomonadota
- Class: Gammaproteobacteria
- Order: Lysobacterales
- Family: Rhodanobacteraceae
- Genus: Fulvimonas; Mergaert et al. 2002

Type species
- Fulvimonas soli

Species
- F. soli F. yonginensis

Genus of bacteria

Fulvimonas is a genus of bacteria from the family of Rhodanobacteraceae.
