= Kordia jejudonensis =

Scientific classification
- Domain: Bacteria
- Kingdom: Pseudomonadati
- Phylum: Bacteroidota
- Class: Flavobacteriia
- Order: Flavobacteriales
- Family: Flavobacteriaceae
- Genus: Kordia
- Species: K. jejudonensis

Binomial name
- Kordia jejudonensis Park et al. 2014

Type strain
- SSK3-3

Bacterium

Kordia jejudonensis is a Gram-negative, aerobic, non-spore-forming and rod-shaped bacterium from the genus Kordia.
