= Luteibacter =

Scientific classification
- Domain: Bacteria
- Kingdom: Pseudomonadati
- Phylum: Pseudomonadota
- Class: Gammaproteobacteria
- Order: Lysobacterales
- Family: Rhodanobacteraceae
- Genus: Luteibacter; Johansen et al. 2005

Type species
- Luteibacter rhizovicinus

Species
- L. anthropi L. rhizovicinus L. yeojuensis

Synonyms
- Luteibactor

Genus of bacteria

Luteibacter is a genus of bacteria from the family of Rhodanobacteraceae.
