= Kordia zhangzhouensis =

Scientific classification
- Domain: Bacteria
- Kingdom: Pseudomonadati
- Phylum: Bacteroidota
- Class: Flavobacteriia
- Order: Flavobacteriales
- Family: Flavobacteriaceae
- Genus: Kordia
- Species: K. zhangzhouensis

Binomial name
- Kordia zhangzhouensis Du et al. 2015

Type strain
- JS14SB-1

Bacterium

Kordia zhangzhouensis is a Gram-negative, aerobic, rod-shaped and non-motile bacterium from the genus Kordia which has been isolated from surface freshwater from the Jiulong River in China.
