= Low-specificity L-threonine aldolase =

Identifiers
- EC no.: 4.1.2.48

Databases
- IntEnz: IntEnz view
- BRENDA: BRENDA entry
- ExPASy: NiceZyme view
- KEGG: KEGG entry
- MetaCyc: metabolic pathway
- PRIAM: profile
- PDB structures: RCSB PDB PDBe PDBsum
Search
- PMC: articles
- PubMed: articles
- NCBI: proteins

Low-specificity L-threonine aldolase (EC 4.1.2.48, LtaE) is an enzyme with systematic name L-threonine/L-allo-threonine acetaldehyde-lyase (glycine-forming). This enzyme catalyses the following chemical reactions:

L-threonine $\rightleftharpoons$ glycine + acetaldehyde
L-allothreonine $\rightleftharpoons$ glycine + acetaldehyde

This enzyme requires pyridoxal phosphate.
