= Kordia (bacterium) =

Scientific classification
- Domain: Bacteria
- Kingdom: Pseudomonadati
- Phylum: Bacteroidota
- Class: Flavobacteriia
- Order: Flavobacteriales
- Family: Flavobacteriaceae
- Genus: Kordia; Sohn et al. 2004

Species
- K. algicida K. antarctica K. aquimaris K. jejudonensis K. periserrulae K. ulvae K. zhangzhouensis K. zosterae

Bacterium

Kordia is a Gram-negative, strictly aerobic and non-motile genus of bacteria from the family of Flavobacteriaceae.
