= Amylibacter lutimaris =

Scientific classification
- Domain: Bacteria
- Kingdom: Pseudomonadati
- Phylum: Pseudomonadota
- Class: Alphaproteobacteria
- Order: Rhodobacterales
- Family: Rhodobacteraceae
- Genus: Amylibacter
- Species: A. lutimaris

Binomial name
- Amylibacter lutimaris Feng et al. 2018

Type strain
- JCM 32051, KACC 19229, strain m18

Species of bacterium

Amylibacter lutimaris is a Gram-negative, aerobic and non-motile bacterium from the genus of Amylibacter which has been isolated from tidal flat sediments from Korea.
