= Kordia periserrulae =

Scientific classification
- Domain: Bacteria
- Kingdom: Pseudomonadati
- Phylum: Bacteroidota
- Class: Flavobacteriia
- Order: Flavobacteriales
- Family: Flavobacteriaceae
- Genus: Kordia
- Species: K. periserrulae

Binomial name
- Kordia periserrulae Choi et al. 2011

Type strain
- IMCC1412

Bacterium

Kordia periserrulae is a Gram-negative, chemoheterotrophic and facultatively anaerobic bacterium from the genus of Kordia which has been isolated from the worm Periserrula leucophryna from the Yellow Sea in Korea.
