= Amylibacter =

Scientific classification
- Domain: Bacteria
- Kingdom: Pseudomonadati
- Phylum: Pseudomonadota
- Class: Alphaproteobacteria
- Order: Rhodobacterales
- Family: Rhodobacteraceae
- Genus: Amylibacter; Teramoto and Nishijima 2014

Type species
- Amylibacter marinus

Species
- A. cionae A. kogurei A. lutimaris A. marinus A. ulvae

Genus of Alphaproteobacteria

Amylibacter is a genus of bacteria from the family of Rhodobacteraceae.
