= Amylibacter cionae =

Scientific classification
- Domain: Bacteria
- Kingdom: Pseudomonadati
- Phylum: Pseudomonadota
- Class: Alphaproteobacteria
- Order: Rhodobacterales
- Family: Rhodobacteraceae
- Genus: Amylibacter
- Species: A. cionae

Binomial name
- Amylibacter cionae Wang et al. 2017

Type strain
- CGMCC 1.15880, KCTC 52581, strain H-12

Species of bacterium

Amylibacter cionae is a Gram-negative, aerobic, rod-shaped and non-motile bacterium from the genus of Amylibacter which has been isolated from the sea squirt Ciona savignyi from Jiaozhou Bay in China.
