= Oleiagrimonas =

Scientific classification
- Domain: Bacteria
- Kingdom: Pseudomonadati
- Phylum: Pseudomonadota
- Class: Gammaproteobacteria
- Order: Lysobacterales
- Family: Rhodanobacteraceae
- Genus: Oleiagrimonas; Fang et al. 2015

Type species
- Oleiagrimonas soli

Species
- O. citrea O. soli

Genus of bacteria

Oleiagrimonas is a genus of gram-negative bacteria.
