= Kordia aquimaris =

Scientific classification
- Domain: Bacteria
- Kingdom: Pseudomonadati
- Phylum: Bacteroidota
- Class: Flavobacteriia
- Order: Flavobacteriales
- Family: Flavobacteriaceae
- Genus: Kordia
- Species: K. aquimaris

Binomial name
- Kordia aquimaris Hameed et al. 2013

Type strain
- CC-AMZ-301

Bacterium

Kordia aquimaris is a Gram-negative, strictly aerobic, non-spore-forming and non-motile bacterium from the genus Kordia which has been isolated from seawater from the coast near the Taichung harbour in Taiwan. Kordia aquimaris produces zeaxanthin.
