= Dichlone =

Names
- Preferred IUPAC name 2,3-Dichloronaphthalene-1,4-dione

Identifiers
CAS Number	117-80-6
3D model (JSmol)	Interactive image
ChEMBL	ChEMBL318782
ChemSpider	8039
ECHA InfoCard	100.003.828
EC Number	204-210-5
PubChem CID	8342
UNII	C28BKZ2J9A
UN number	2902 2761
CompTox Dashboard (EPA)	DTXSID7020425
- InChI: InChI=1S/C10H4Cl2O2/c11-7-8(12)10(14)6-4-2-1-3-5(6)9(7)13/h1-4H Key: SVPKNMBRVBMTLB-UHFFFAOYSA-N
- SMILES: C1=CC=C2C(=C1)C(=O)C(=C(C2=O)Cl)Cl

Properties
Chemical formula	C_{10}H_{4}Cl_{2}O_{2}
Molar mass	227.04 g·mol^{−1}
Appearance	Yellow crystals
Melting point	193 °C (379 °F; 466 K)
Solubility in water	0.1 ppm

Hazards
- GHS labelling
Pictograms	(GHS07: Exclamation mark) (GHS09: Environmental hazard)
Signal word	Warning
Hazard statements	H302, H315, H317, H319, H410
Precautionary statements	P261, P264, P264+P265, P270, P272, P273, P280, P301+P317, P302+P352, P305+P351+P338, P321, P330, P333+P317, P337+P317, P362+P364, P391, P501
- Except where otherwise noted, data are given for materials in their standard state (at 25 °C [77 °F], 100 kPa). Infobox references

Dichlone (trade names Phygon and Quintar) is a fungicide and algicide of the quinone class. It is a general use fungicide applied to fruits, vegetables, field crops, ornamentals, and residential and commercial outdoor areas. It is also used to control blue algae.

Dichlone is not persistent in soil and has moderate mammalian toxicity.

Dichlone can be manufactured by the chlorination and oxidation of naphthalene.

Synthesis of dichlone from naphthalene
