= Hydrocarboniphaga =

Scientific classification
- Domain: Bacteria
- Kingdom: Pseudomonadati
- Phylum: Pseudomonadota
- Class: Gammaproteobacteria
- Order: Nevskiales
- Family: Nevskiaceae
- Genus: Hydrocarboniphaga; Palleroni et al. 2004

Type species
- Hydrocarboniphaga effusa

Species
- Hydrocarboniphaga daqingensis Hydrocarboniphaga effusa

Synonyms
- Hydrocarbophaga

Genus of bacteria

Hydrocarboniphaga is a genus of bacteria from the family Nevskiaceae.
