= Kordia antarctica =

Scientific classification
- Domain: Bacteria
- Kingdom: Pseudomonadati
- Phylum: Bacteroidota
- Class: Flavobacteriia
- Order: Flavobacteriales
- Family: Flavobacteriaceae
- Genus: Kordia
- Species: K. antarctica

Binomial name
- Kordia antarctica Baek et al. 2013

Type strain
- IMCC3317

Bacterium

Kordia antarctica is a Gram-negative, chemoheterotrophic, facultatively anaerobic and non-motile bacterium from the genus Kordia which has been isolated from seawater from the Antarctic.
