= Aquimonas =

Scientific classification
- Domain: Bacteria
- Kingdom: Pseudomonadati
- Phylum: Pseudomonadota
- Class: Gammaproteobacteria
- Order: Lysobacterales
- Family: Rhodanobacteraceae
- Genus: Aquimonas; Saha et al. 2005

Type species
- Aquimonas voraii

Species
- A. voraiivoraii

Genus of bacteria

Aquimonas is a Gram-negative and aerobic genus of bacteria from the family of Rhodanobacteraceae with one known species (Aquimonas voraii). Aquimonas voraii has been isolated from water from a warm spring from Assam in India.
