= Fontimonas =

Scientific classification
- Domain: Bacteria
- Kingdom: Pseudomonadati
- Phylum: Pseudomonadota
- Class: Gammaproteobacteria
- Order: Nevskiales
- Family: Nevskiaceae
- Genus: Fontimonas; Losey et al. 2013
- Species: F. thermophila

Binomial name
- Fontimonas thermophila Losey et al. 2013

Genus of bacteria

Fontimonas is a Gram-negative genus of bacteria from the family Nevskiaceae with one known species, Fontimonas thermophila. Fontimonas thermophila has been isolated from a hot spring from the Hot Springs National Park in the United States.
