= Amylibacter marinus =

Scientific classification
- Domain: Bacteria
- Kingdom: Pseudomonadati
- Phylum: Pseudomonadota
- Class: Alphaproteobacteria
- Order: Rhodobacterales
- Family: Rhodobacteraceae
- Genus: Amylibacter
- Species: A. marinus

Binomial name
- Amylibacter marinus Teramoto and Nishijima 2014

Type strain
- LMG 28364, NBRC 110140, strain 2-3

Species of bacterium

Amylibacter marinus is a Gram-negative, aerobic, mesophilic and non-motile bacterium from the genus of Amylibacter which has been isolated from seawater near Muroto in Japan.
