= Tahibacter =

Scientific classification
- Domain: Bacteria
- Kingdom: Pseudomonadati
- Phylum: Pseudomonadota
- Class: Gammaproteobacteria
- Order: Lysobacterales
- Family: Rhodanobacteraceae
- Genus: Tahibacter; Makk et al. 2014

Type species
- Tahibacter aquaticus

Species
- T. aquaticus T. caeni

Genus of bacteria

Tahibacter is a genus of Pseudomonadota from the family of Rhodanobacteraceae.
