= Nevskia =

Scientific classification
- Domain: Bacteria
- Kingdom: Pseudomonadati
- Phylum: Pseudomonadota
- Class: Gammaproteobacteria
- Order: Nevskiales
- Family: Nevskiaceae
- Genus: Nevskia; Famintzin 1892

Type species
- Nevskia ramosa Famintzin 1892 (Approved Lists 1980)

Species
- Nevskia aquatilis Nevskia lacus Nevskia persephonica Nevskia ramosa Nevskia soli Nevskia terrae

Genus of bacteria

Nevskia is a Gram negative, strictly aerobic and motile genus of bacteria from the family Nevskiaceae.
