= 3-Hydroxyasparagine =

Names
- IUPAC name 3-Hydroxyasparagine
- Other names β-Hydroxyasparagine

Identifiers
CAS Number	20790-72-1
3D model (JSmol)	Interactive image
ChEBI	CHEBI:141828
ChemSpider	3670287
DrugBank	DB04527
KEGG	C20631
PubChem CID	152191
UNII	9J17BCS69U
CompTox Dashboard (EPA)	DTXSID001310305
- InChI: InChI=1S/C4H8N2O4/c5-1(4(9)10)2(7)3(6)8/h1-2,7H,5H2,(H2,6,8)(H,9,10)/t1-,2?/m0/s1 Key: VQTLPSCRBFYDNX-PIKHSQJKSA-N
- SMILES: [C@H](C(C(=O)N)O)(C(=O)O)N

Properties
Chemical formula	C_{4}H_{8}N_{2}O_{4}
Molar mass	148.118 g·mol^{−1}
- Except where otherwise noted, data are given for materials in their standard state (at 25 °C [77 °F], 100 kPa). Infobox references

3-Hydroxyasparagine also known as β-hydroxyasparagine (beta-hydroxyasparagine) is a modified asparagine amino acid. It appears in posttranslational modification of cbEGF-like domains which can occur in humans and other Eukaryotes. The amino acid code used for this is Hyn. The modified amino acid residue is found in fibrillin-1. This amino acid is also found in urine.
