= Solimonas =

Scientific classification
- Domain: Bacteria
- Kingdom: Pseudomonadati
- Phylum: Pseudomonadota
- Class: Gammaproteobacteria
- Order: Nevskiales
- Family: Nevskiaceae
- Genus: Solimonas; Kim et al. 2007

Type species
- Solimonas soli Kim et al. 2007

Species
- Solimonas aquatica Solimonas flava Solimonas soli Solimonas terrae Solimonas variicoloris

Synonyms
- Singularimonas; Sinobacter

Genus of bacteria

Solimonas is a genus of bacteria from the family Nevskiaceae.
