= Kordia ulvae =

Scientific classification
- Domain: Bacteria
- Kingdom: Pseudomonadati
- Phylum: Bacteroidota
- Class: Flavobacteriia
- Order: Flavobacteriales
- Family: Flavobacteriaceae
- Genus: Kordia
- Species: K. ulvae

Binomial name
- Kordia ulvae Qi et al. 2016

Type strain
- SC2

Bacterium

Kordia ulvae is a Gram-negative, aerobic and rod-shaped bacterium from the genus Kordia which has been isolated from the alga Ulva.
