= Amylibacter ulvae =

Scientific classification
- Domain: Bacteria
- Kingdom: Pseudomonadati
- Phylum: Pseudomonadota
- Class: Alphaproteobacteria
- Order: Rhodobacterales
- Family: Rhodobacteraceae
- Genus: Amylibacter
- Species: A. ulvae

Binomial name
- Amylibacter ulvae Nedashkovskaya et al. 2016

Type strain
- KCTC 32465, KMM 6515, strain 6Alg 255

Species of bacterium

Amylibacter ulvae is a Gram-negative, strictly aerobic, rod-shaped and non-motile bacterium from the genus of Amylibacter which has been isolated from the alga Ulva fenestrata.
