= Allothreonine =

L-Allothreonine
D-Allothreonine

Names
- Other names (2S,3S)-2-amino-3-hydroxybutanoic acid

Identifiers
CAS Number	DL-: 144-98-9; L-: 28954-12-3
3D model (JSmol)	DL-: Interactive image; L-: Interactive image
ChEBI	L-: CHEBI:28718
ChEMBL	L-: ChEMBL59238
ChemSpider	DL-: 200; L-: 89699
EC Number	L-: 249-327-2
KEGG	L-: C05519
PubChem CID	L-: 99289
UNII	DL-: 29NAP6417F; L-: HCQ253CKVK
CompTox Dashboard (EPA)	DL-: DTXSID301030659; L-: DTXSID10183151
- InChI: InChI=1/C4H9NO3/c1-2(6)3(5)4(7)8/h2-3,6H,5H2,1H3,(H,7,8)/t2-,3-/s2 Key: AYFVYJQAPQTCCC-HSGWWGIINA-N; L-: InChI=1S/C4H9NO3/c1-2(6)3(5)4(7)8/h2-3,6H,5H2,1H3,(H,7,8)/t2-,3-/m0/s1 Key: AYFVYJQAPQTCCC-HRFVKAFMSA-N
- SMILES: DL-: CC(C(C(=O)O)N)O; L-: C[C@@H]([C@@H](C(=O)O)N)O

Properties
Chemical formula	C_{4}H_{9}NO_{3}
Molar mass	119.120 g·mol^{−1}
Appearance	White solid
Melting point	273.5–275.0 °C (524.3–527.0 °F; 546.6–548.1 K) decomposition
- Except where otherwise noted, data are given for materials in their standard state (at 25 °C [77 °F], 100 kPa). Infobox references

Allothreonine is an amino acid with the formula CH_{3}CH(OH)CH(NH_{2})CO_{2}H. It is the diastereomer of the amino acid threonine. Like most other amino acids, allothreonine is a water-soluble colorless solid. Although not one of the proteinogenic amino acids, it has often been the subject for the synthesis of novel proteins using an expanded genetic code. Racemic allothreonine can be produced in the laboratory from bromomethoxybutyric acid.

== Structure ==
Threonine has R, S stereochemistry at carbons 2 and 3 for the naturally occurring stereoisomer and S, R stereochemistry for its enantiomer. Allothreonine has S, S stereochemistry at carbons 2 and 3 in the natural stereoisomer, but R, R in the very rare enantiomer.

L-Threonine (2R,3S) and D-Threonine (2S,3R)

L-Allothreonine (2S,3S) and D-Allothreonine (2R,3R)

== Occurrence ==
Katanosins are a group of potent antibiotics containing allothreonine.

Peptides containing the allothreonine residue have also been isolated from natural sources.
