= Lysobacter =

- Attachment of Lysobacter enzymogenes strain C3 to fungal hyphae of Magnaporthe oryzae (also known as rice blast and gray leaf spot of turfgrass)

Scientific classification
- Domain: Bacteria
- Kingdom: Pseudomonadati
- Phylum: Pseudomonadota
- Class: Gammaproteobacteria
- Order: Lysobacterales
- Family: Lysobacteraceae
- Genus: Lysobacter

Genus of bacteria

The genus Lysobacter belongs to the family Lysobacteraceae within the Gammaproteobacteria and includes at least 46 named species, including: Lysobacter enzymogenes, L. antibioticus, L. gummosus, L. brunescens, L. defluvii, L. niabensis, L. niastensis, L. daejeonensis, L. yangpyeongensis, L. koreensis, L. concretionis, L. spongiicola, and L. capsici. Lysobacter spp. were originally grouped with myxobacteria because they shared the distinctive trait of gliding motility, but they uniquely display a number of traits that distinguish them from other taxonomically and ecologically related microbes including high genomic G+C content (typically ranging between 65 and 72%) and the lack of flagella. The feature of gliding motility alone has piqued the interest of many, since the role of gliding bacteria in soil ecology is poorly understood. In addition, while a number of different mechanisms have been proposed for gliding motility among a wide range of bacterial species, the genetic mechanism in Lysobacter remains unknown. Members of the Lysobacter group have gained broad interest for production of extracellular enzymes. The group is also regarded as a rich source for production of novel antibiotics, such as β-lactams containing substituted side chains, macrocyclic lactams and macrocyclic peptide or depsipeptide antibiotics like the katanosins.

== Habitat ==
The genus Lysobacter belongs to the Xanthomonadaceae family within the gamma proteobacteria. These bacteria are Gram-negative strict aerobes. Lysobacter spp. have been described as ubiquitous inhabitants of soil and water. Their presence has been largely ignored, since members often are minor components in sample screenings when using conventional isolation procedures. However, because of improved molecular methods of identification and better descriptions for the genus, their agricultural relevance is becoming increasingly evident, especially as members of ecologically significant microbial communities associated with soil and plants. Recent evidence suggests Lysobacter spp. may occupy a wide range of ecological niches beyond those associated with plants, including a broad range of 'extreme' environments. For example, 16S rDNA phylogenetic analyses show Lysobacter clades that include sequences obtained from hydrothermal vents, isolates from Mt. Pinatubo mud flows and upflow anaerobic blanket sludge reactors, and an iron-oxidizing, microaerophilic lithotroph.

Lysobacter gummosus was discovered living on the skin of redback salamanders and producing 2,4-diacetylphloroglucinol, a chemical which inhibits the growth of certain pathogenic fungi.

== Biological control ==
A number of Lysobacter species are now recognized as bacterial predators with an impressive arsenal of bioactive small molecules, which gives them potential both as biocontrol agents and producers of promising drug leads. The potential of Lysobacter species as biological control agents for plant diseases has been recognized. Among L. enzymogenes strains, C3 is the most thoroughly characterized strain at both the molecular and biological levels. The ecological versatility of the strain is reflected by the range of diseases it is able to control, as well as the various plant hosts and plant parts it is capable of colonizing. For example, L. enzymogenes strain C3 (erroneously identified as Stenotrophomonas maltophilia) has been reported to control foliar diseases such as leaf spot of tall fescue caused by Bipolaris sorokiniana, bean rust caused by Uromyces appendiculatus and Fusarium head blight of wheat. L. enzymogenes strain C3 also has been reported to suppress soilborne diseases, such as brown patch in turfgrass caused by Rhizoctonia solani, the seedling disease Pythium damping-off of sugarbeet and summer patch disease of Kentucky bluegrass caused by the root-infecting Magnaporthe poae. Lysobacter sp. SB-K88 has been found to suppress damping-off disease in sugar beet and spinach through antibiosis and characteristic root colonization in perpendicular fashion. Among plant beneficial rhizobacteria, members of the genus Lysobacter have been evaluated as biocontrol agents in greenhouse and field trials against plant diseases caused by bacteria, fungi and oomycetes.

== Disease-suppressive soils ==
Lysobacter species have also been isolated from soils suppressive to Rhizoctonia solani. Clay soils with natural suppressiveness against Rhizoctonia contained higher numbers of antagonistic isolates of L. gummosus, L. antibioticus, and/or L. capsici. Although the mechanism behind this phenomenon is not yet understood, it appeared that growing grass/clover increased the number of these Lysobacter species, as well as the Rhizoctonia suppressiveness.

== Mechanisms of antagonism ==
Originally characterized as a biological control agent for plant diseases, L. enzymogenes strain C3 is unique in that it expresses a wide range of mechanisms contributing to microbial antagonism and biological control that are not shared by all strains of the species. Several metabolites produced by Lysobacter species, mostly L. enzymogenes, have attracted considerable interest for their activities against methicillin-resistant Staphylococcus aureus (MRSA) and vancomycin-resistant enterococci (VRE). Lysobacter enzymogenes employs twitching motility and antimicrobial factors (HSAF and lyase) to establish a “mobile-attack” strategy against filamentous fungi and oomycetes. Twitching motility is also thought to facilitate the bacterial colonization on host fungal surfaces and production of biofilms (a multicellular community) by L. enzymogenes.

The strain produces numerous extracellular enzymes that contribute to biocontrol activity, including multiple forms of β-1,3-glucanases and chitinases. The strain also has been demonstrated to induce systemic resistance in certain plants, protecting them from pathogen infection. In addition, recent studies have indicated important roles for secondary metabolites with antibiotic activity and biosurfactant activity in fungal antagonism. Several of these traits are globally controlled by a regulator encoded by the clp gene. Mutations in clp are intriguing for two reasons. First, the mutant phenotype implies that a broad range of genes is involved in secreted antimicrobials associated with the clp regulon, many of which remain unidentified. The second is that mutations in clp result in significant loss of extracellular enzyme activities and antimicrobial activity displayed by L. enzymogenes strain C3. These activities normally are phenotypically overwhelming and often lead to masking of other phenotypes in standard assays, making mutation effects of non-related genes difficult or nearly impossible to evaluate. However, strains harboring clp gene mutations provide a means to separate clp-regulated phenotypes from others (such as that described below), thus making their evaluation feasible. Biological control and mode of actions of disease suppression by Lysobacter spp. has been reviewed by Islam 2011.

== Lysobacter genetics ==
L. enzymogenes strain C3 is a genetically tractable strain allowing for easy construction of gene knockouts, supporting its use as a model genetic system for unraveling the molecular basis of pathogenicity, as well as identifying mechanisms of microbial antagonism and biological control. Indeed, a number of derivative strains of L. enzymogenes strain C3 already have been constructed, including mutants affected in structural genes encoding enzyme activities, the regulatory clp gene and various combinations thereof.

The genus Lysobacter belongs to the Xanthomonadaceae family within the gamma proteobacteria. These bacteria are Gram-negative strict aerobes.

A number of Lysobacter species are now recognized as bacterial predators with an impressive arsenal of bioactive small molecules, which gives them potential both as biocontrol agents and producers of promising drug leads.

Several metabolites produced by Lysobacter species, mostly L. enzymogenes, have attracted considerable interest for their activities against methicillin-resistant Staphylococcus aureus (MRSA) and vancomycin-resistant enterococci (VRE).

Among plant beneficial rhizobacteria, members of the genus Lysobacter have been evaluated as biocontrol agents in greenhouse and field trials against plant diseases caused by bacteria, fungi and oomycetes.

Lysobacter enzymogenes employs twitching motility and antimicrobial factors (HSAF and lyase) to establish a “mobile-attack” strategy against filamentous fungi and oomycetes. Twitching motility is also thought to facilitate the bacterial colonization on host fungal surfaces and production of biofilms (a multicellular community) by L. enzymogenes.

== Species ==
The genus has 46 known species (July 2018):

- Lysobacter aestuarii
- Lysobacter agri
- Lysobacter antibioticus
- Lysobacter arseniciresistens
- Lysobacter brunescens
- Lysobacter burgurensis
- Lysobacter capsici
- Lysobacter caeni
- Lysobacter cavernae
- Lysobacter concretionis
- Lysobacter daejeonensis
- Lysobacter defluvii
- Lysobacter dokdonensis
- Lysobacter enzymogenes
- Lysobacter erysipheiresistens
- Lysobacter firmicutimachus
- Lysobacter fragariae
- Lysobacter ginsengisoli
- Lysobacter gummosus
- Lysobacter hankyongensis
- Lysobacter humi
- Lysobacter koreensis
- Lysobacter korlensis
- Lysobacter lycopersici
- Lysobacter maris
- Lysobacter mobilis
- Lysobacter niabensis
- Lysobacter niastensis
- Lysobacter novalis
- Lysobacter olei
- Lysobacter oligotrophicus
- Lysobacter oryzae
- Lysobacter panacisoli
- Lysobacter panaciterrae
- Lysobacter rhizophilus
- Lysobacter rhizosphaerae
- Lysobacter ruishenii
- Lysobacter sediminicola
- Lysobacter silvestris
- Lysobacter solanacearum
- Lysobacter soli
- Lysobacter spongiicola
- Lysobacter terrae
- Lysobacter terricola
- Lysobacter thermophilus
- Lysobacter tolerans
- Lysobacter ximonensis
- Lysobacter xinjiangensis
- Lysobacter yangpyeongensis
