= Nevskiales =

Scientific classification
- Domain: Bacteria
- Kingdom: Pseudomonadati
- Phylum: Pseudomonadota
- Class: Gammaproteobacteria
- Order: Nevskiales; Naushad et al. 2015

Type genus
- Nevskia Famintzin 1892 (Approved Lists 1980)

Families
- Nevskiaceae Henrici and Johnson 1935 (Approved Lists 1980); Algiphilaceae Gutiérrez et al. 2012; Salinisphaeraceae Naushad et al. 2015; Steroidobacteraceae Liu et al. 2019

Synonyms
- Steroidobacterales Montecillo 2023

Order of bacteria

The Nevskiales are an order of Gram-negative bacteria within the class Gammaproteobacteria.
