= Rhodanobacteraceae =

Scientific classification
- Domain: Bacteria
- Kingdom: Pseudomonadati
- Phylum: Pseudomonadota
- Class: Gammaproteobacteria
- Order: Lysobacterales
- Family: Rhodanobacteraceae; Naushad et al. 2015

Type genus
- Rhodanobacter Nalin et al. 1999

Genera
- Aerosticca Watanabe et al. 2020; Ahniella Hwang et al. 2018; Aquimonas Saha et al. 2005; Chiayiivirga Hsu et al. 2013; "Denitratimonas" Han et al. 2016; Dokdonella Yoon et al. 2006; Dyella Xie and Yokota 2005; Frateuria Swings et al. 1980; Fulvimonas Mergaert et al. 2002; Luteibacter Johansen et al. 2005; Oleiagrimonas Fang et al. 2015; Pseudofulvimonas Kämpfer et al. 2010; Rehaibacterium Yu et al. 2013; Rhodanobacter Nalin et al. 1999; Rudaea Weon et al. 2009; Tahibacter Makk et al. 2014

Family of bacteria

Rhodanobacteraceae is a family of bacteria of the order Lysobacterales. The type genus is Rhodanobacter.
