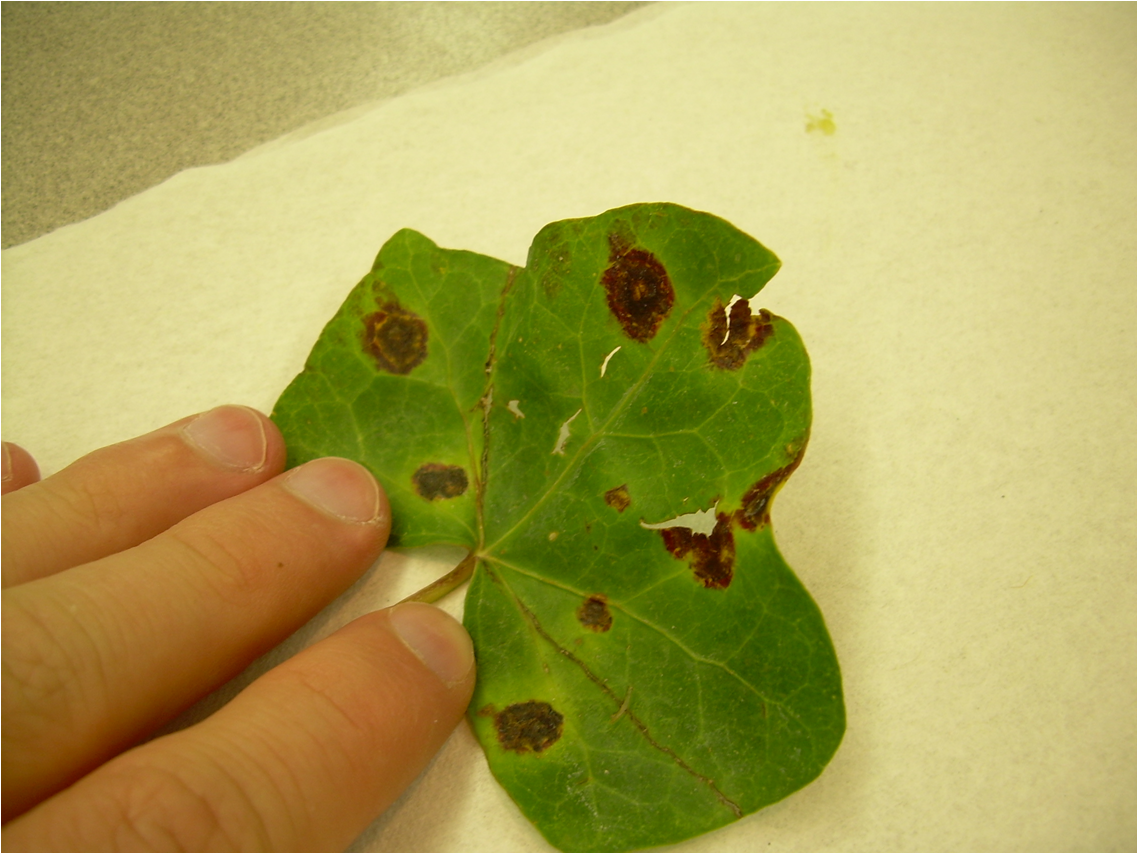
- Leaf spot on English ivy plant, caused by Xanthomonas hortorum

Scientific classification
- Domain: Bacteria
- Kingdom: Pseudomonadati
- Phylum: Pseudomonadota
- Class: Gammaproteobacteria
- Order: Lysobacterales; Christensen and Cook 1978 (Approved Lists 1980)

Type genus
- Lysobacter Christensen and Cook 1978 (Approved Lists 1980)

Families
- Lysobacteraceae Christensen and Cook 1978 (Approved Lists 1980); Marinicellaceae Chuvochina et al. 2024; Rhodanobacteraceae Naushad et al. 2015

Synonyms
- Xanthomonadales Saddler and Bradbury 2005

= Lysobacterales =

Order of bacteria

The Lysobacterales are a bacterial order within the Gammaproteobacteria. They are one of the largest groups of bacterial phytopathogens, harbouring species such as Xanthomonas citri, Xanthomonas euvesicatoria, Xanthomonas oryzae and Xylella fastidiosa. These bacteria affect agriculturally important plants including tomatoes, bananas, citrus plants, rice, and coffee. Species within the genus Stenotrophomonas are multidrug resistant opportunistic pathogens that are responsible for nosocomial infections in immunodeficient patients.

== Characteristics ==
The Lysobacterales are gram-negative, catalase positive, non-spore forming obligate aerobes. Members belonging to the order are straight rods lacking prosthecae. While some members are non-motile, other species within the order are motile by means of flagella. Stenotrophomonas is the only genus capable of nitrate reduction within the Lysobacterales.

== Taxonomy ==
The Lysobacterales consist of 28 validly named genera among two families: Lysobacteraceae and Rhodanobacteraceae. The Lysobacteraceae consists of 13 genera while the Rhodanobacteraceae consist of 14 genera. The families can be distinguished from one another on the basis of conserved signature indels found among a variety of proteins, specific for each family. These indels are in parallel with phylogenomic analysis that reveal two distinct clades that appear to be evolutionarily divergent.

Xanthomonadales and Xanthomonadaceae are synonyms of Lysobacterales and Lysobacteraceae, respectively.

== Phylogenetic position ==
The Lysobacterales are early divergents of bacteria within the Gammaproteobacteria, and are often used to root phylogenetic trees created for the class. Until recently, the Xanthomonadales order was inclusive of the families Xanthomonadaceae, Algiphilaceae, Solimonadaceae, Nevskiaceae and Sinobacteraceae. However, no molecular signatures were found that were inclusive of all families. The organisms were taxonomically rearranged such that Lysobacterales included Lysobacteraceae, which was later divided into two families. The division was in accordance with CSIs that were found specifically for all members of the emended Lysobacterales order, providing support for the currently accepted taxonomy. All other species were transferred to Nevskiales, which did not share CSIs with Lysobacterales, but remain close relatives within the Gammaproteobacteria. Cardiobacteriales, Chromatiales, Methylococcales, Legionellales and Thiotrichales are also deep branching orders that are phylogenetic neighbours of Lysobacterales and Nevskiales members. The order Nevskiales harbors a single family (Salinisphaeraceae) and six genera: Alkanibacter, Fontimonas, Hydrocarboniphaga, Nevskia, Solimonas and Steroidobacter. Wohlfahrtiimonas chitiniclastica and Ignatzschineria larvae are two species that have historically been accepted as members of the family Xanthomonadaceae. However, they do not share conserved signatures with the family, or with the Xanthomonodales order. These species form deep branching within neighbouring Gammaproteobacteria, and are monophyletic with Cardiobacteriales members. These species are thus currently labelled as incertae sedis.

== Phylogeny ==
The currently accepted taxonomy is based on the National Center for Biotechnology Information (NCBI).

- Lysobacteraceae
  - Arenimonas
  - Denitratimonas
  - Kaistibacter
  - Luteimonas
  - Lysobacter
  - Pseudoxanthomonas
  - Rehaibacterium
  - Silanimonas
  - Stenotrophomonas
  - Thermomonas
  - Vulcaniibacterium
  - Xanthomonas
  - Xylella
- Marinicellaceae
  - Marinicella
- Rhodanobacteraceae
  - Gynumella
  - Aquimonas
  - Chiayiivigra
  - Megamonas
  - Dokdonella
  - Dyella
  - Frateuria
  - Fulvimonas
  - Luteibacter
  - Metallibacterium
  - Mizugakiibacter
  - Oleiagrimonas
  - Pseudofulvimonas
  - Rhodanobacter
  - Rudaea
  - Tahibacter
