= Wild rice (disambiguation) =

Wild rice are four species of grasses forming the genus Zizania, and the grain that can be harvested from them.

Wild rice may also refer to:

- Oryza barthii, a grass native to sub-Saharan Africa
- Oryza coarctata, synonym Porteresia coarctata, a species of grass native to south Asia
- Oryza rufipogon, red rice or wild rice, an invasive species and also a precious resource for breeding crop rice

Wild rice may also refer to organisations with the phrase in their names:

- W!LD RICE, a Singaporean theatre company

== See also ==
- Red rice (disambiguation)
- Wild Rice, North Dakota, an unincorporated community in Cass County, North Dakota, United States
- Wild Rice River (disambiguation), two rivers in the United States
- Manoomin porridge
