= Perennial rice =

Varieties of rice that can grow season after season without re-seeding

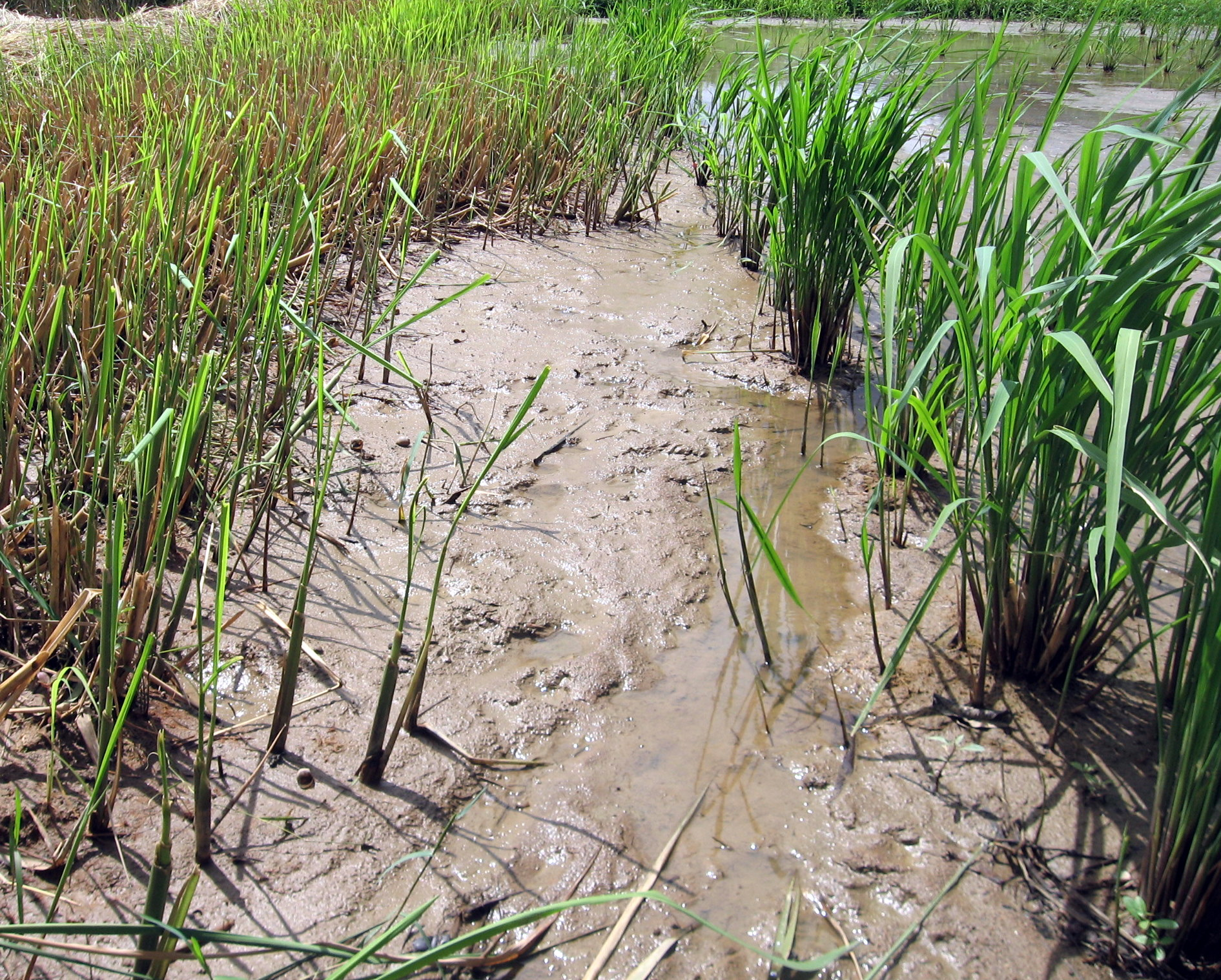
Rice regrowing from rhizomes

Perennial rice are varieties of long-lived rice that are capable of regrowing season after season without reseeding; they are being developed by plant geneticists at several institutions. Although these varieties are genetically distinct and will be adapted for different climates and cropping systems, their lifespan is so different from other kinds of rice that they are collectively called perennial rice. Perennial rice—like many other perennial plants—can spread by horizontal stems below or just above the surface of the soil but they also reproduce sexually by producing flowers, pollen and seeds. As with any other grain crop, it is the seeds that are harvested and eaten by humans.

Perennial rice is one of several perennial grains that have been proposed, researched or are being developed, including perennial wheat, sunflower, and sorghum. Agronomists have argued that increasing the amount of agricultural landscapes covered at any given time with perennial crops is an excellent way to stabilize and improve the soil, and provide wildlife habitat.

Perennial rice breeding was initiated at the International Rice Research Institute, Philippines and are currently being developed at the Yunnan Academy of Agricultural Sciences, People's Republic of China, and other institutions, but are not yet available for distribution.

== Perennial and annual rice ==
Domesticated Asian rice, Oryza sativa is a short-lived plant. Most cultivars die after producing seeds, though some can regrow (ratoon) and produce a second crop under favorable conditions. In regions with mild climates, two or three crops of rice may be grown each year. Except for ratoon crops, this means that the dead stalks must be removed, the soil cultivated, and new seed sown every few months.

In contrast, the wild ancestor of Asian rice, Oryza rufipogon, often lives for many years, setting seed each year and spreading vegetatively. In addition to these perennial types, some O. rufipogon populations are annuals or intermediate in lifespan.

Other wild species in the genus Oryza are also perennial. While perennial Oryza rufipogon spreads vegetatively by above-ground stems (stolons), O. longistaminata, O. officinalis, O. australiensis, O. rhizomatis spread by underground stems (rhizomes).

== Potential benefits ==
=== Reduced soil erosion ===
By all accounts erosion is the most serious natural resource and environmental consequence of rainfed upland rice production.

— P. Crosson (1995) Natural resource and environmental consequences of rice production.

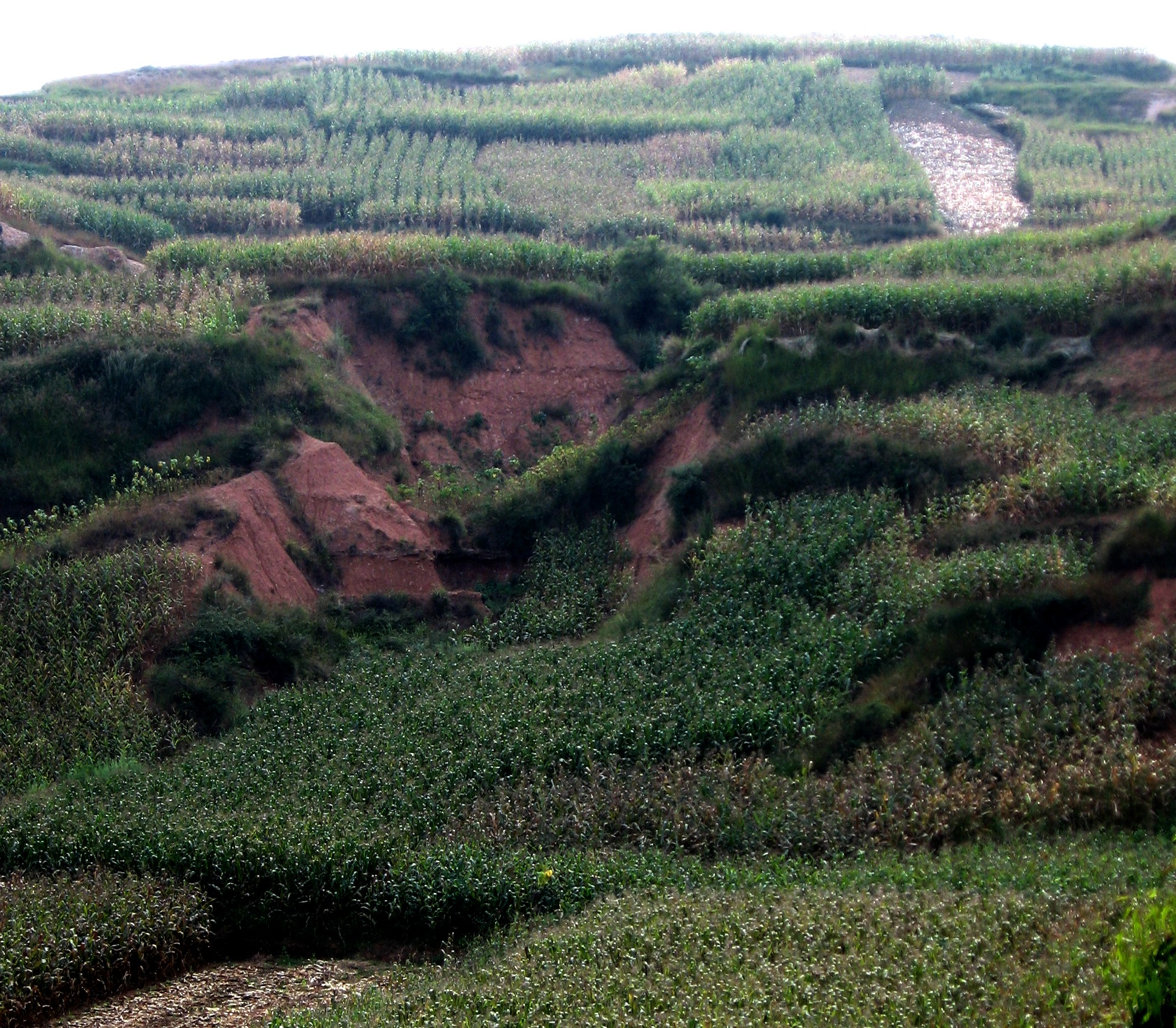
Erosion gulleys on unterraced hill farm in Yunnan Province

Farm fields, especially those in the humid tropics, that have been cleared of vegetation or recently plowed are highly vulnerable to soil and nutrient loss through wind or water erosion, soil compaction, and decline in soil organic matter and microbial biomass.

Eroded fields become less productive and the soil particles and dissolved nutrients cause environmental problems downstream, including hypoxia in oceans and rivers and the silting of reservoirs and waterways.

Perennial plants regrow quickly after being harvested, re-establishing a protective cover. The fields do not need to be plowed after the initial planting.

Researchers at The International Rice Research Institute (IRRI) believed that perennial rice would "improve the sustainability of food production in the hilly uplands and downstream."

=== Reduced rate of deforestation ===
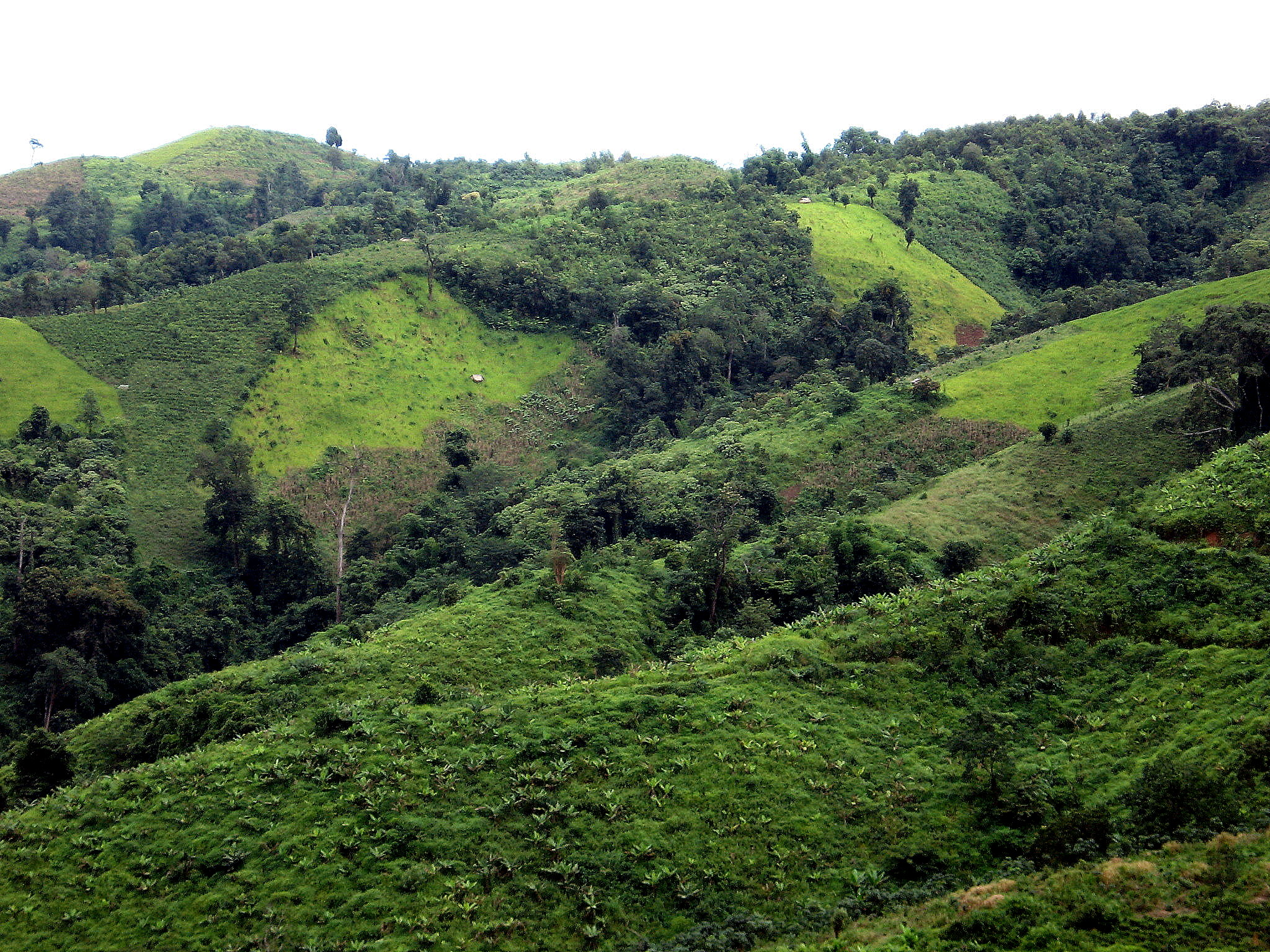
Slash-and-burn agriculture has left only a few patches of forest on these hills in Yunnan Province. The light green patches are upland rice

A high-yielding, nutritious, perennial cereal could allow poor farmers around the world to produce food on a plot of land indefinitely. Currently, many subsistence farmers clear plots in the forest for their crops. Once the soil and its nutrients have washed away, the plot is abandoned and a new piece of forest is slashed and burned. Forest may eventually regenerate on the abandoned plot, or weedy grasses may dominate. Environmental impacts of this cropping system include loss of biodiversity, carbon dioxide emissions, increased runoff and decreased rainfall. Deforestation could be reduced by practices that conserve soil productivity

=== Other potential benefits ===
- Drought resistance: Annual rice has a shallow root system and is very drought susceptible. A long-lived plant has time to develop a deep and extensive root system making it theoretically capable of accessing more moisture than an annual plant. Tilled soil dries out more quickly than untilled
- Resist weed invasion: Weed pressure has increased in upland rice systems as the fallow period has shortened. Ecologist Jack Ewel wrote: "Weeds are widely recognized as a major impediment to continuous cropping in the humid tropics, and fields are often abandoned more because uncontrollable weed populations are anticipated than because of declining fertility or pest buildups." Grassland restoration with perennials results in fewer annual weeds and perennial grasses, sown at appropriate densities, can out-compete even perennial weeds once they are established.
- Plant nutrition: While shallow rooted species, such as rice obtain most of their nutrients from the topsoil, deep rooted perennials can obtain significant proportion of their phosphorus from the subsoil. "Deep roots are especially important in nutrient-poor substrates because they increase the volume of soil exploited by the vegetation".
- Reduce the need for transplanting, weeding, and other backbreaking labor.
- More efficient use of applied fertilizer

== Potential disadvantages ==
1. Improved habitat for pests. If fields are not left bare for a portion of the year, rodents and insects populations may increase. Burning of the stubble of perennial rice could reduce these populations, but burning may not be permitted in some areas. Furthermore, rodents and insects living underground would survive burning, whereas tillage disrupts their habitat.
2. Makes crop rotation more difficult. Crop rotations with perennial systems are possible, but the full rotation will necessarily take longer. The slower pace of rotation—compared with annual crops—could allow a greater buildup of pathogens, pests or weeds in the perennial phase of the rotation.
3. Builds soil organic matter at the expense of plant productivity. In the absence of tillage, and in soils with depleted organic matter, crops with large root systems may build up organic matter to the point that nearly all of the soil nitrogen and phosphorus is immobilized. When this happens, productivity may decline until either the organic matter builds up to a level where equilibrium is reached between nutrient mineralization and nutrient immobilization or fertilizer is added to the system.
4. Hydrological impacts. Perennial plants may intercept and utilize more of the incoming rainfall. than annual plants each year. This may result in water tables dropping and/or reduced surface flow to rivers.
5. Reduced nutrient delivery to downstream farms. Wide replacement of annual with perennial plants on agricultural landscapes could stabilize soils and reduce nitrate leaching to the point that the delivery of sediment and dissolved nitrogen to downstream landscapes could be reduced. Farmers in these areas may currently rely on these nutrient inputs. On the other hand, other water usage sectors might benefit from improved water quality.

== Target environments for perennial rice ==
=== Upland rice ===
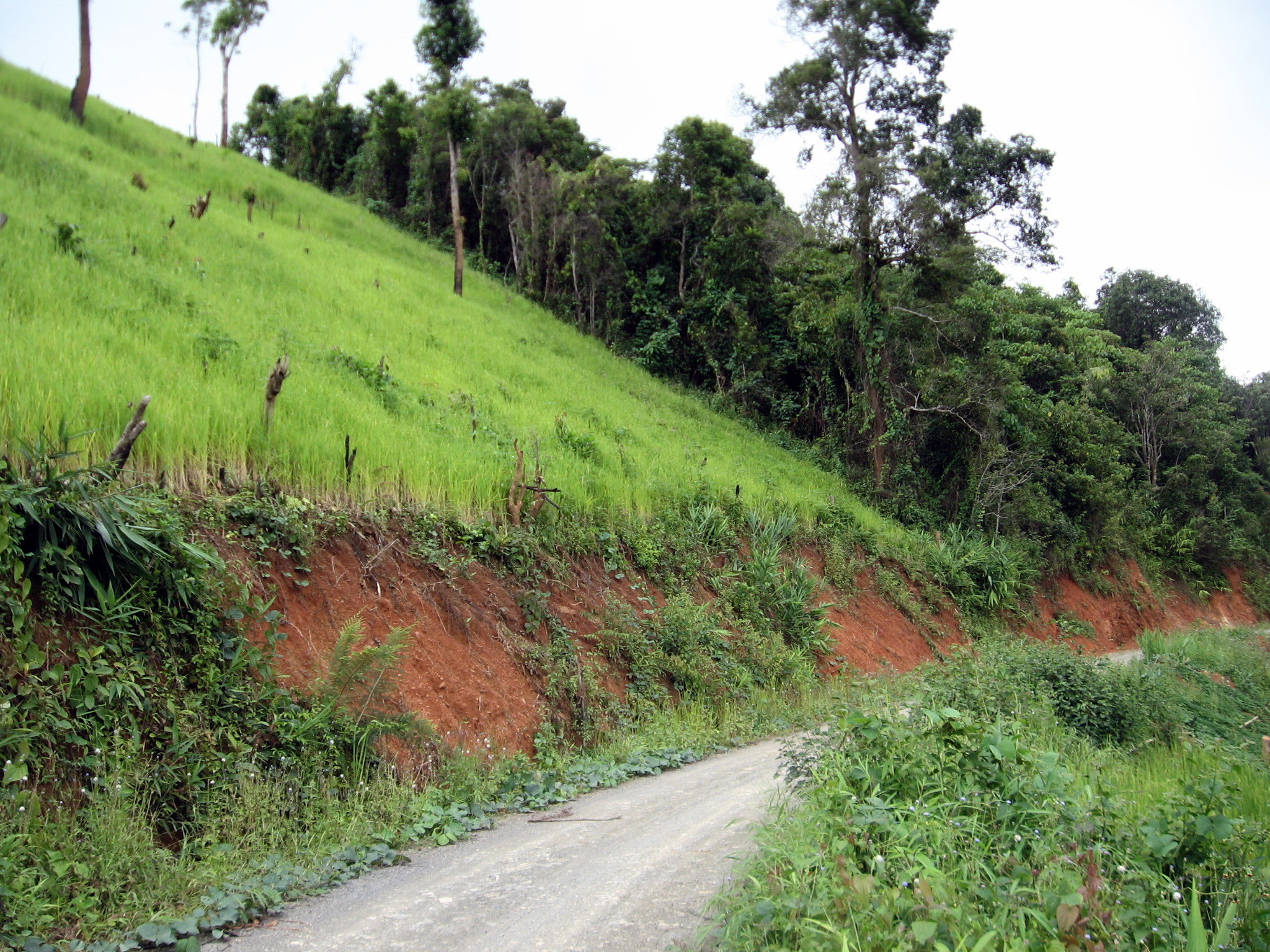
Upland rice growing amid the charred stumps of recently cleared forest

Upland rice is grown on more than 7,500,000 acres (30,000 km^{2}) in the highlands of southern China and across southeast Asia. Because it is grown on steeply sloping soil without terracing, severe erosion results, and a given patch of land can economically produce rice for only a year or two before it must be allowed to return to natural vegetation—only to be cleared and re-sown to rice a few years later. Population increase and agricultural intensification is reducing the fallow period. This is a potent recipe for soil degradation. Were rice a perennial rather than an annual species, its continuously living roots and thick cover of vegetation would prevent such erosion, just as a planting of grass can prevent a roadside slope from washing away. Perennial rice could produce critically needed food year after year on the same plot of land without degrading the soil.

=== Rainfed paddy rice ===
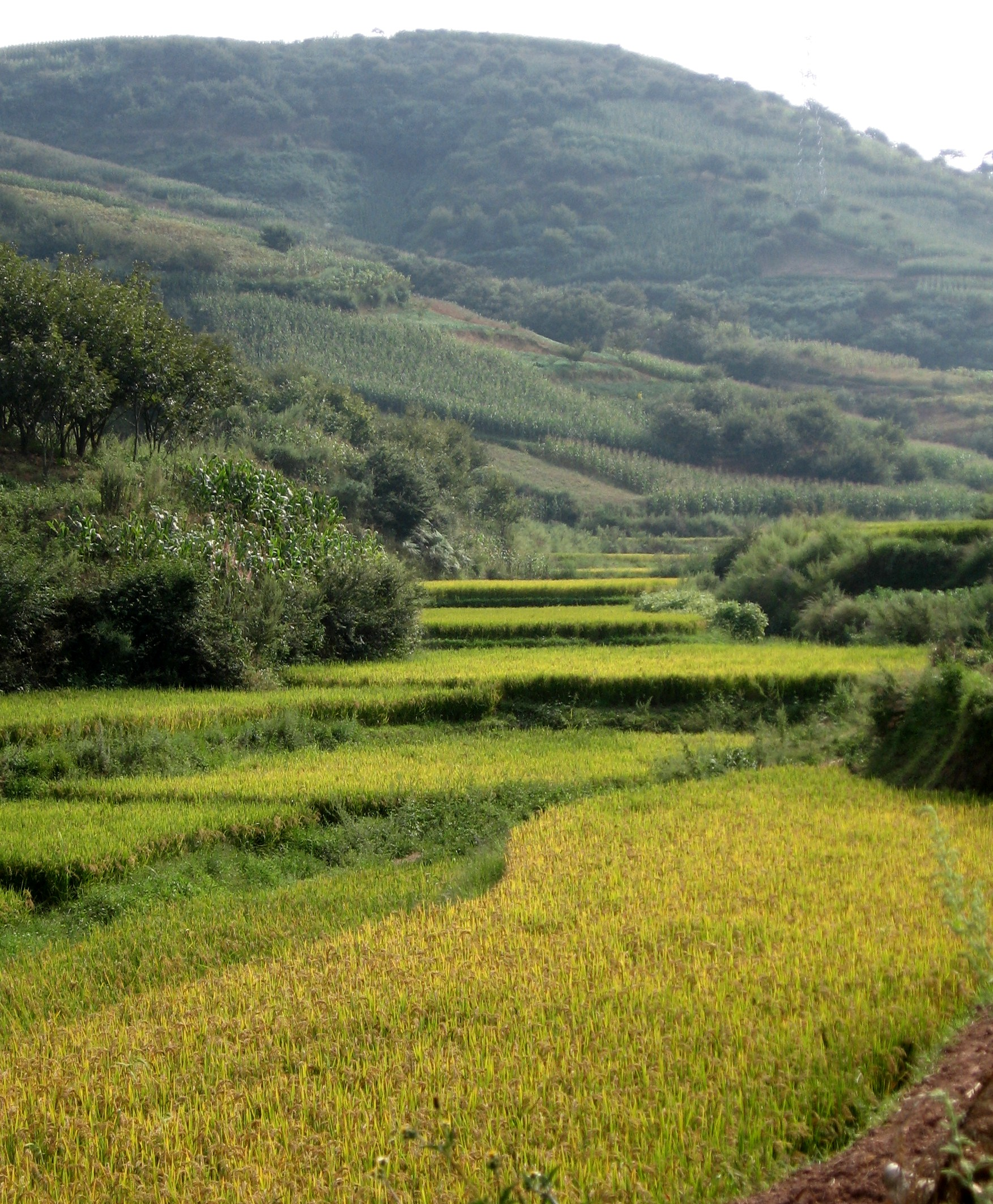
Level, bunded rice paddies in a Yunnan Province valley.

38 million ha (26%) of rice lands are terraced but unirrigated. This cropping system produces about 17% of world rice.

While upland rice production systems were the initial target for the perennialization of rice, the perennial habit may prove to have benefits in paddy systems where erosion is less of a concern. Faced with drought one year and flooding the next, "...the rainfed rice farmer can usefully be thought of first as a manager of risk and uncertainty." Given the erratic moisture, many farmers do not use purchased fertilizers. With deforestation, manure may be used as cooking fuel making fertility a key problem. Where fertilizers are purchased, flooding can result in fertilizer runoff contaminating water systems.

Rice with deeper roots, as would be predicted with perennial rice, could exploit the moisture and nutrients in a greater soil volume than short-rooted types (discussed above). The perennial habit could reduce the uncertainty of planting and transplanting with erratic rainfall patterns. Rhizomes would simply lie dormant until temperature and moisture conditions were adequate for emergence.

=== Irrigated paddy rice ===
Irrigated rice is very productive and this production method must be fairly sustainable, as it has been practiced in China for millennia. However, high yielding rhizomatous rice varieties may still have some advantages, according to Dr. Dayun Tao

- Fixing hybrid vigor: The first generation hybrids between two particular lines or individuals may be exceptionally good, but may be almost impossible to re-create. If the exceptional individual was perennial and rhizomatous, millions of genetically identical plants (clones) could be made from pieces of the rhizomes.
- Expediting the production of inbred lines: Even if the final propagule for the farmers' fields is hybrid seed, not hybrid clones, the parents of exceptional F1 hybrids could be immediately clonally propagated if they were rhizomatous. These genetic replicas could be maintained indefinitely and crossed afresh each year to produce new F1 hybrid seed. Normally, re-creating parents using sexual reproduction requires many generations of inbreeding.
- Ratoon cropping: In some environments, additional grain crops could be harvested each year if the plants ratooned quickly. Shoots growing from the mature plant can reach the reproductive stage more quickly than shoots growing from seed. Transplanting seedlings is faster than sowing seed, but still requires time and labor-intensive field preparation and, of course, a large supply of labor for transplanting.

Other benefits can be imagined in this environment:

- Reduce the need for transplanting, weeding, and other backbreaking labor. Because of migration to cities, many rural parts of Asia actually suffer from severe labor shortages.
- More efficient use of applied fertilizer

== History of perennial rice research ==
=== Interspecific hybridization and embryo culture, Thailand, early 1990s ===
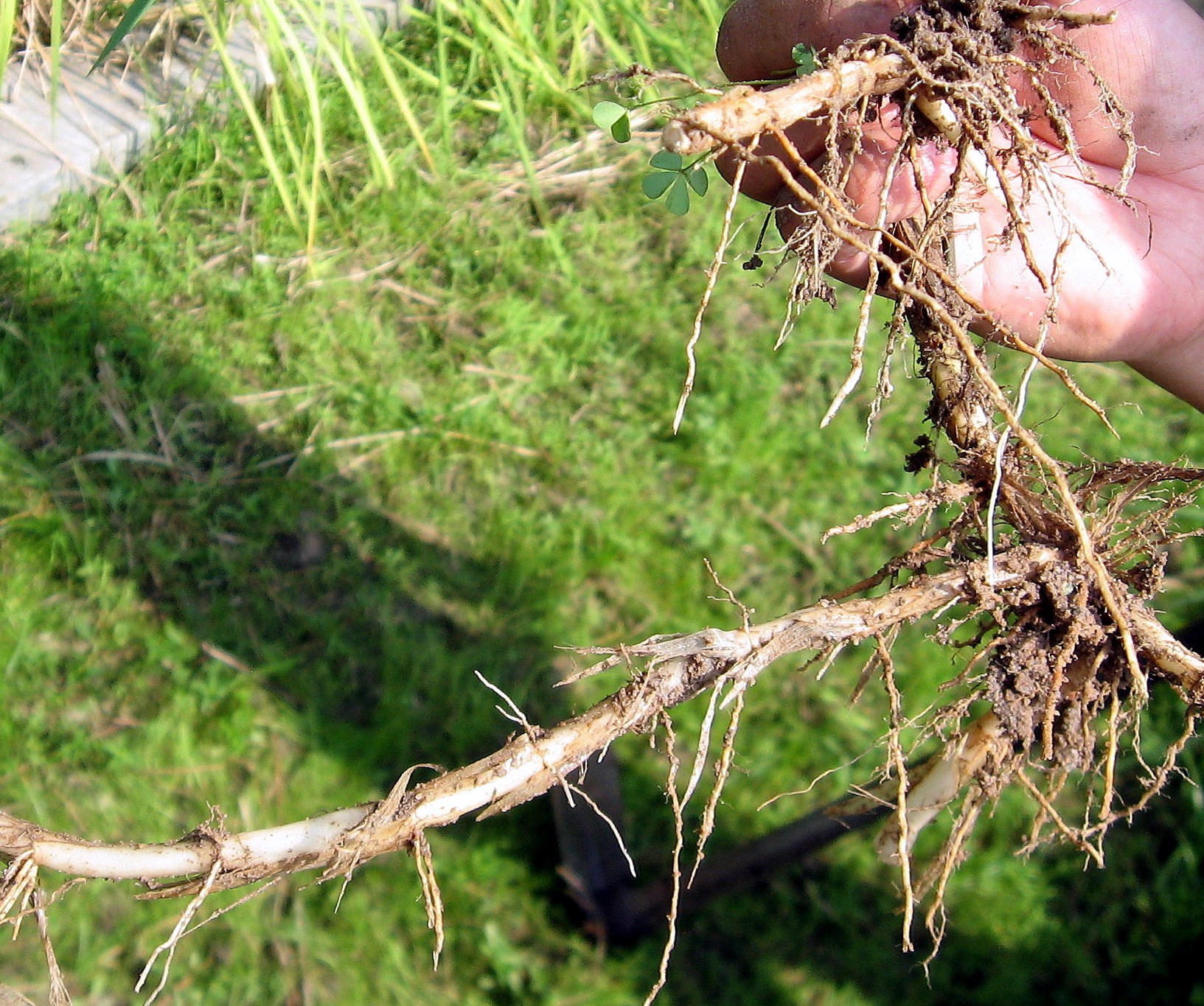
Rhizome from the O. longistaminata parent of Dr. Tao's original hybrid

Drs Dayun Tao and Prapa Sripichitt, working at the Department of Agronomy, Kasetsart University, Bangkok, made numerous crosses between rice and wild, rhizomatous species. The difficulty of this work is illustrated by the case of the single successful hybrid they obtained between Oryza sativa and O. longistaminata. To get this one plant, 119 rice florets were pollinated, which produced 51 seeds. Of these seeds, 33 had culturable embryos, and only one of these embryos developed into a viable plant. Put another way, this hybridization was relatively easy: over 3,000 pollinations had to be made between rice and O. rhizomatis to get a single viable plant. It was a fortunate cross in other respects: the hybrid was healthy and rhizomatous (it is still alive) and partially fertile, allowing F2 seed to be obtained.

=== Perennial Upland Rice program, Philippines, 1990-2001 ===
To address the problem of erosion in upland rice-growing regions, the International Rice Research Institute (IRRI) initiated a breeding program for perennial upland rice in the mid-1990s. Within just a few years, the program achieved significant progress. The Perennial Upland Rice project team used populations derived from crossing the rice plant Oryza sativa with two different distantly related perennials in the hopes that at least one of these strategies would enable genes from the perennial to be moved to the cultivated rice gene pool.

- O. rufipogon as donor of perenniality traits. Fertility of the progeny families was generally good, as might have been predicted, given that O. rufipogon is the ancestor of cultivated rice. Many families were perennial, and some of the highest yielding families were the most perennial, suggesting that breeding for both yield and perenniality is feasible.
- O. longistaminata as donor of perenniality traits. This African species is genetically diverse, strongly perennial and rhizomatous. Rhizomes may be able to survive and spread in drier conditions than stolons. The downside of this donor is that it is more distantly related to cultivated rice and the crosses and backcrosses are much more difficult to make. Descendants of the few successful crosses are mostly infertile, and few were perennial. Many of the perennial plants lacked rhizomes. Rhizomes may not be essential for survival, but they may help plants survive stress and they certainly help them spread.

=== Mapping major rhizome genes, China, 1999-2001 ===
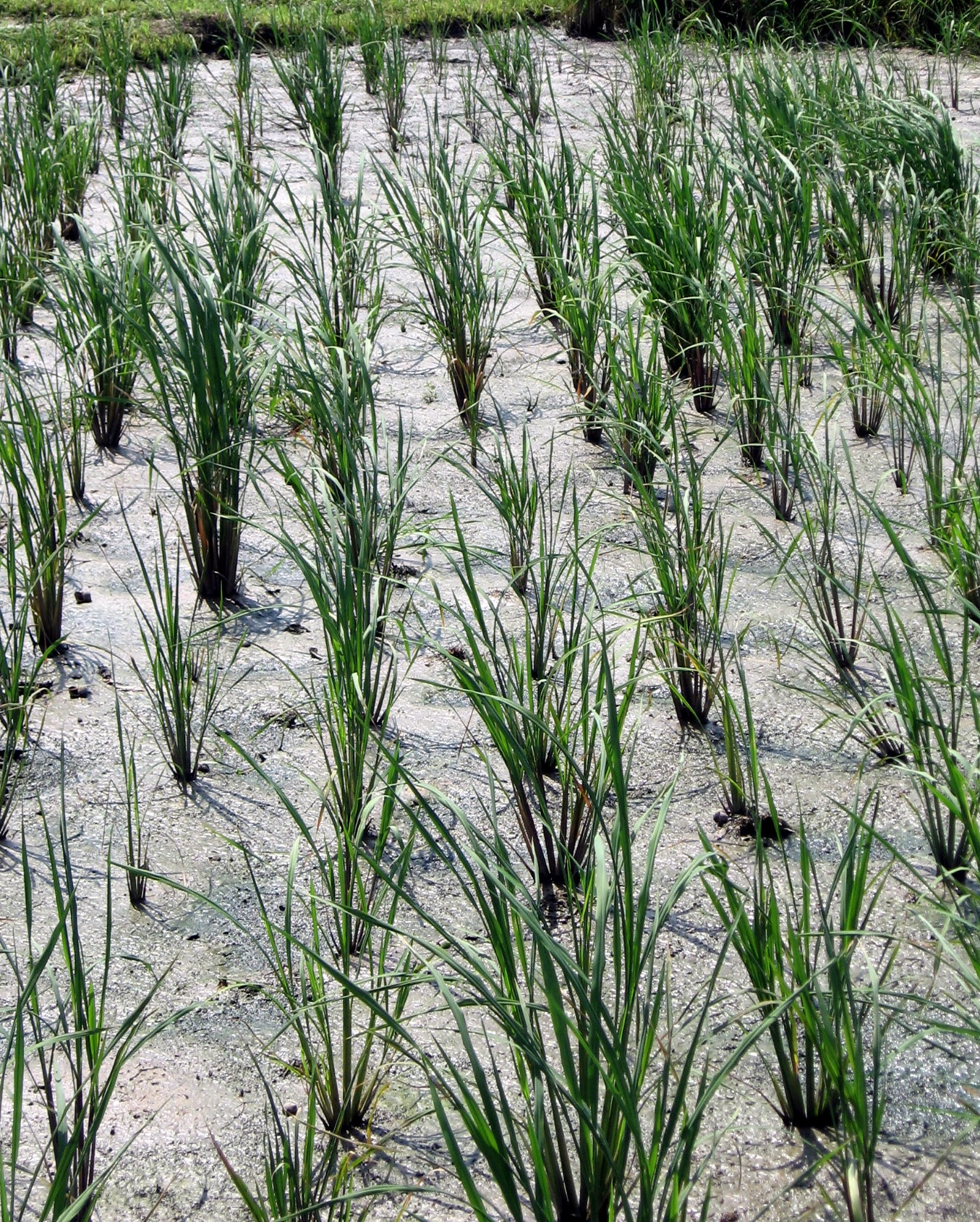
Perennial rice research plot at a YAAS research station on Hainan Islands

Hu Fengyi, now deputy director of the Food Crops Institute at YAAS, worked on the IRRI perennial-rice project and was senior author of the paper that first reported on mapping of genes for rhizome production in rice. Using the F2 population derived from the Oryza sativa/O. longistaminata cross, two dominant-complementary genes, rhz2 and rhz3 controlling rhizomatousness were mapped. These were found to correspond with two QTLs associated with rhizomatousness in the genus Sorghum, suggesting that the evolution of the annual habit occurred independently, long after these species diverged. Efforts to map these genes in rice more finely are ongoing. Although other genes undoubtedly contribute to perenniality and rhizomatousness, these two are required in rice. Breeders use markers for these genes to assist in identifying potentially perennial individuals.

=== Breeding population development, China, 2007-present ===
The IRRI project was terminated in 2001 because of budget cuts, but the Yunnan Academy of Agricultural Sciences (YAAS) in Kunming has continued the research. Rhizome were considered more stress tolerant than stolons, so they focused on populations derived from crosses with O. longistaminata. As Eric Sacks and colleagues found at IRRI, the plants in these populations mostly lack rhizomes and have a high level of sterility. Finding the extremely rare plants with both rhizomes and fertility has required screening large F2 and Backcross populations.

The newly released cultivar of perennial rice 23 (PR23) represents a new rice production system that is based on no-tillage.

== Goals for perennial rice breeding ==
=== Restore seed fertility ===
Mapping genes that cause partial to complete sterility in many interspecific hybrids. As many as 35 such genes have been mapped in Oryza, and sterility is a big problem in the perennial rice program.

=== Develop methods for quickly identifying rhizomatous plants ===
- Marker assisted selection allows large numbers of plants to be screened for rhizome markers. In the field, plants are evaluated first for rhizome production, then for seed fertility, and finally for pollen viability through staining
- Fine mapping of rhizome genes will improve the efficiency of marker-aided-selection or even allow rhizome genes to be cloned and used in recombinant gene techniques.

=== Eliminate undesirable genes from Oryza longistaminata ===
Along with potentially useful genes for rhizomes, stress tolerance and disease resistance, undesirable genes from O. longistaminata are also still present in breeding populations. Back-crossing to high-yielding rice varieties is one way to reduce the frequency of these wild alleles.

- Awns: wild Oryza species have awns, but farmers prefer awnless rice.
- Small seed size: wild Oryza species have small seeds, but larger seeds are easier to thresh and clean. Larger seeds germinate more vigorously. Increasing seed size is one way to increase grain yield.
- Altered grain quality: it will be difficult to achieve the flavor and cooking properties of traditional rice varieties. And there are thousands of local varieties with unique properties. Choosing from among the possible quality goals and then achieving them is a "formidable challenge" for all rice breeding programs.
- Low yield: the high yield of elite grain varieties is always compromised by crossing with wild material. However, even low-yielding wild rice species can harbor genes for increasing yield

== See also ==
- Plant breeding
- Perennial grain
- Perennial vegetable
- Hybrid (biology)
- Slash-and-burn agriculture
- Subsistence agriculture
- Zizania texana — Texas wild rice, a perennial plant
