= Perennial crop =

Perennial plants used as crops

Perennial crops are a perennial plant species that are cultivated and live longer than two years without the need of being replanted each year. Naturally perennial crops include many fruit and nut crops; some herbs and vegetables also qualify as perennial. Perennial crops have been cultivated for thousands of years; their cultivation differs from the mainstream annual agriculture because regular tilling is not required and this results in decreased soil erosion and increased soil health. Some perennial plants that are not cultivated as perennial crops are tomatoes, whose vines can live for several years but often freeze and die in winters outside of temperate climates, and potatoes which can live for more than two years but are usually harvested yearly. Despite making up 94% of plants on earth, perennials take up only 13% of global cropland. In contrast, grain crops take up about 70% of global cropland and global caloric consumption and are largely annual plants.

== History ==
There is a growing movement to create perennial alternatives to annual crops particularly grains. From the 1920s to the 1950s, researchers in the former Soviet Union attempted to perennialize annual wheats by crossing them with perennial relatives such as intermediate wheatgrass. Interest waned when the crosses repeatedly resulted in sterile offspring, and seed yield decreased significantly. The next major time the project of perennializing grain was picked up was a wheat hybrid developed by the Montana Agricultural Experiment Station in 1986, which the Rodale Institute field tested. For example, The Land Institute has bred a perennial wheat crop known as Kernza. By eliminating or greatly reducing the need for tillage, perennial cropping can reduce topsoil losses due to erosion, increase biological carbon sequestration, and greatly reduce waterway pollution through agricultural runoff due to less nitrogen input.

== Benefits ==
- Erosion control: Because plant materials (stems, crowns, etc.) can remain in place year-round, topsoil erosion due to wind and rainfall/irrigation is reduced
- Water-use efficiency: Because these crops tend to be deeper and more fibrously-rooted than their annual counterparts, they are able to hold onto soil moisture more efficiently, while filtering pollutants (e.g. excess nitrogen) traveling to groundwater sources.
- Nutrient cycling efficiency: Because perennials more efficiently take up nutrients as a result of their extensive root systems, reduced amounts of nutrients need to be supplemented, lowering production costs while reducing possible excess sources of fertilizer runoff.
- Light interception efficiency: Earlier canopy development and longer green leaf duration increase the seasonal light interception efficiency of perennials, an important factor in plant productivity.
- Carbon sequestration: Because perennial grasses use a greater fraction of carbon to produce root systems, more carbon is integrated into soil organic matter, contributing to increases in soil organic carbon stocks.
- Climate Change: Perennial species have been shown to provide an opportunity for mitigating or reducing the negative effects of climate change while sustaining their agricultural productivity as well. It has also been shown that perennial plant communities may also enhance ecosystem resilience. As well as stability and ability to adapt to environmental fluctuations, due to them possessing high levels of biodiversity.

== Examples ==
=== Existing crops ===
- Fruit and nut trees
- Oil palm
- Edible berries
- Asparagus
- Rhubarb
- Chives
- Mint
- Oregano
- Kale
- Sugarcane
- Sugar Maple

=== Under development ===
- Miscanthus giganteus - a perennial crop with high yields and high GHG mitigation potential.
- Perennial sunflower - a perennial oil and seedcrop developed through backcrossing genes with wild sunflower.
- Perennial grain - more extensive root systems allow for more efficient water and nutrient uptake, while reducing year-round erosion due to rain and wind.
- Perennial rice - currently in the development stage using similar methods to those used in producing the perennialized sunflower, perennial rice promises to reduce deforestation through increases in production efficiency by keeping cleared land out of the fallow stage for long periods of time.

== See also ==
- Agroecology
- Biodynamic agriculture
- Guild (agriculture)
- No-till agriculture
- Permaculture
- Perennial plant
- Sustainable agriculture
- List of culinary nuts
- Fruit tree
