= Red rice (disambiguation) =

Red rice may refer to:

- Red rice, varieties of rice that are red in color
- Red yeast rice, a type of fermented rice
- Oryza glaberrima, also known as African red rice
- Oryza longistaminata, also known as red rice
- Oryza punctata, also known as red rice
- Oryza rufipogon, also known as wild rice and red rice
- Weedy rice, also known as red rice, a low-yielding rice variety that persists as a weed in fields of better-quality rice
- Mexican rice, a dish that may become red in color
- Charleston red rice, a dish in the American states of South Carolina and Georgia
- Red Rice (album), a 1998 album by Eliza Carthy
- Red Rice, Hampshire, a small hamlet just south-west of Andover, Hampshire, England

== See also ==
- Redrice
