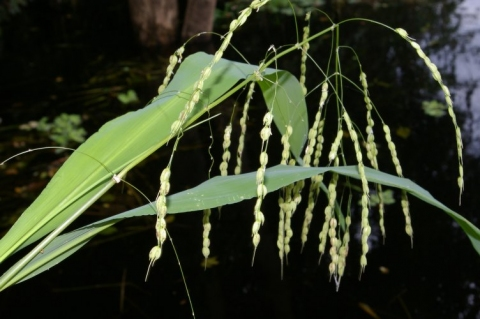

Scientific classification
- Kingdom: Plantae
- Clade: Tracheophytes
- Clade: Angiosperms
- Clade: Monocots
- Clade: Commelinids
- Order: Poales
- Family: Poaceae
- Genus: Oryza
- Species: O. grandiglumis

Binomial name
- Oryza grandiglumis (Döll) Prodoehl

= Oryza grandiglumis =

Rice wild relative, S. & Central America

Oryza grandiglumis is a type of wild rice of the genus Oryza found in tropical countries of South- and Central- America, namely Argentina, Bolivia, Brazil, Colombia, Ecuador, French Guiana, Paraguay, Venezuela, and Peru. Studied in 1998 in Caño Negro, in northern Costa Rica, it is an annual plant with short rhizomes; its culms can reach 790 centimetres (311 in) and are 4–9 millimetres (5/32–23/64 in) in thickness. They have developed aerenchyma which allows them to float.

== Genomics ==
Oryza grandiglumis is a tetraploid of 2n = 48. It has a CCDD genome as with several others in the O. officinalis complex.
