= Perennial grain =

Grain crops that remain productive for two or more years without replanting

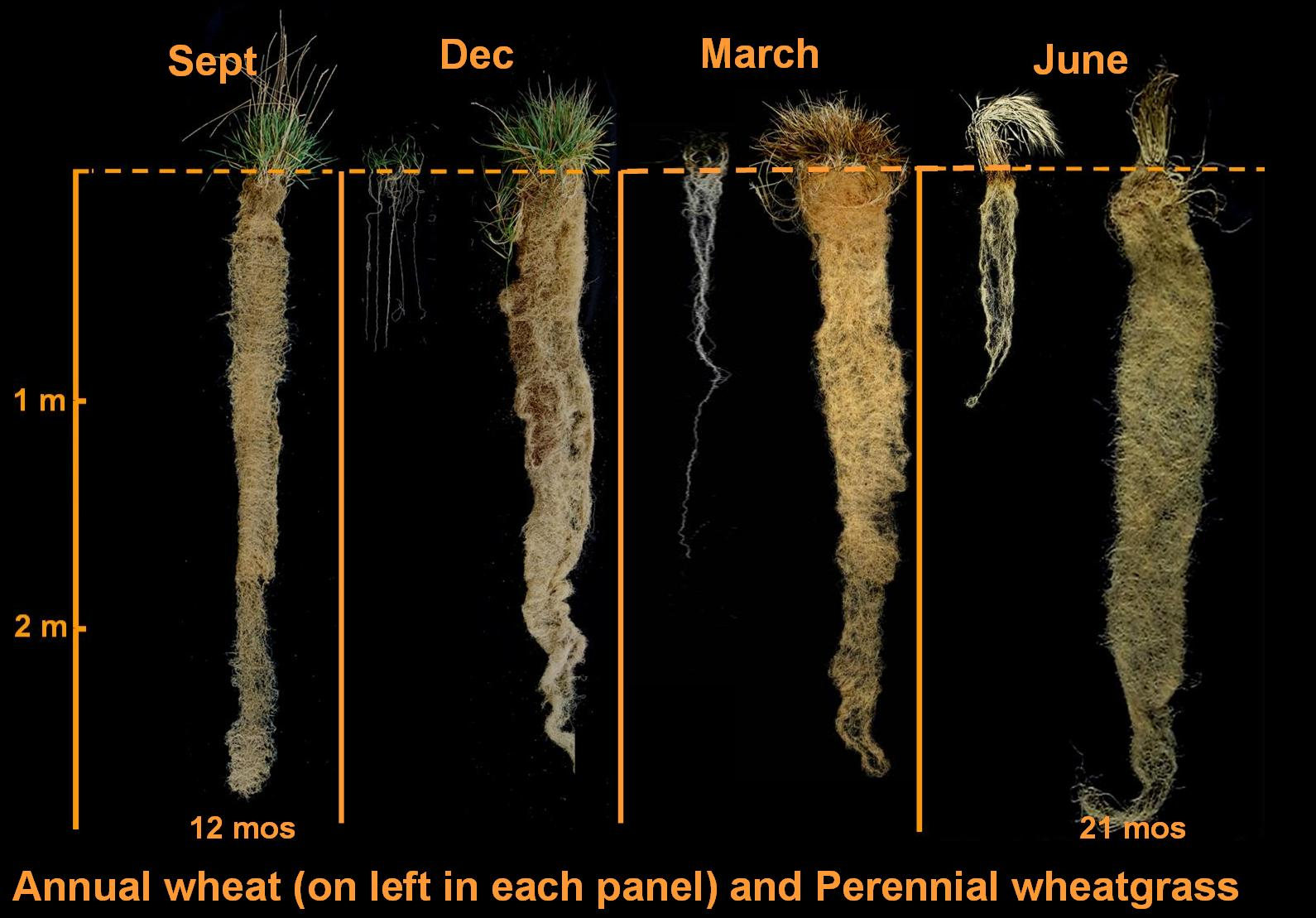
Roots of intermediate wheatgrass, a perennial grain candidate compared to those of annual wheat (at left in each panel)

A perennial grain is a grain crop that lives and remains productive for two or more years, rather than growing for only one season before harvest, like most grains and annual crops. While many fruit, nut and forage crops are long-lived perennial plants, all major grain crops presently used in large-scale agriculture are annuals or short-lived perennials grown as annuals. Scientists from several nations have argued that perennial versions of today's grain crops could be developed and that these perennial grains could make grain agriculture more sustainable.

== Rationale ==
Cultivation often has a negative impact on provision of [ecosystem] services. For example, cultivated systems tend to use more water, increase water pollution and soil erosion, store less carbon, emit more greenhouse gases, and support significantly less habitat and biodiversity than the ecosystems they replace

— The Millennium Ecosystem Assessment

The 2005 Synthesis Report of the United Nations' Millennium Ecosystem Assessment program labeled agriculture the "largest threat to biodiversity and ecosystem function of any single human activity." Perennial grains could reduce this threat, according to the following logic:

- Most agricultural land is devoted to the production of grain crops: cereal, oilseed, and legume crops occupy 75% of US and 69% of global croplands. These grains include such cereal crops as wheat, rice, and maize; together they provide over 70% of human food calories.
- All these grain crops are currently annual plants which are generally planted into cultivated soil.
- Frequent cultivation puts soil at risk of loss and degradation.
- This "central dilemma" of agriculture in which current food production undermines the potential for future food production could be escaped by developing perennial grain crops that do not require tilling the soil each year. No-till technology enables short-lived (annual) crops to be grown with less intense tillage, but perennial plants provide the most protection for the soil.

== Crop development ==
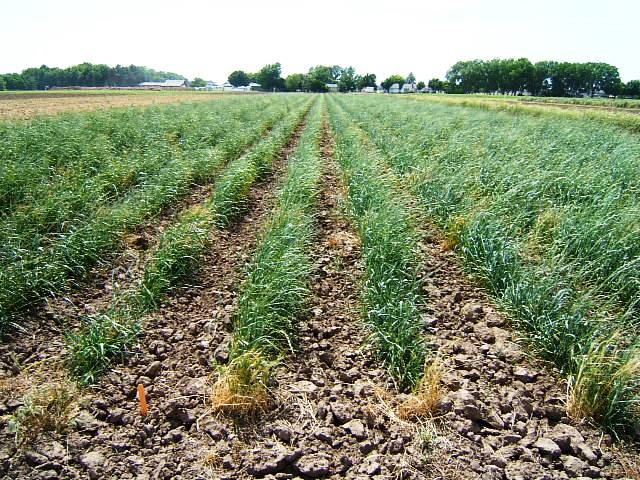
Thinopyrum intermedium (intermediate wheatgrass) first year nursery. A 4000-plant breeding nursery in the first year. Thinopyrum intermedium is being domesticated as a perennial grain crop.

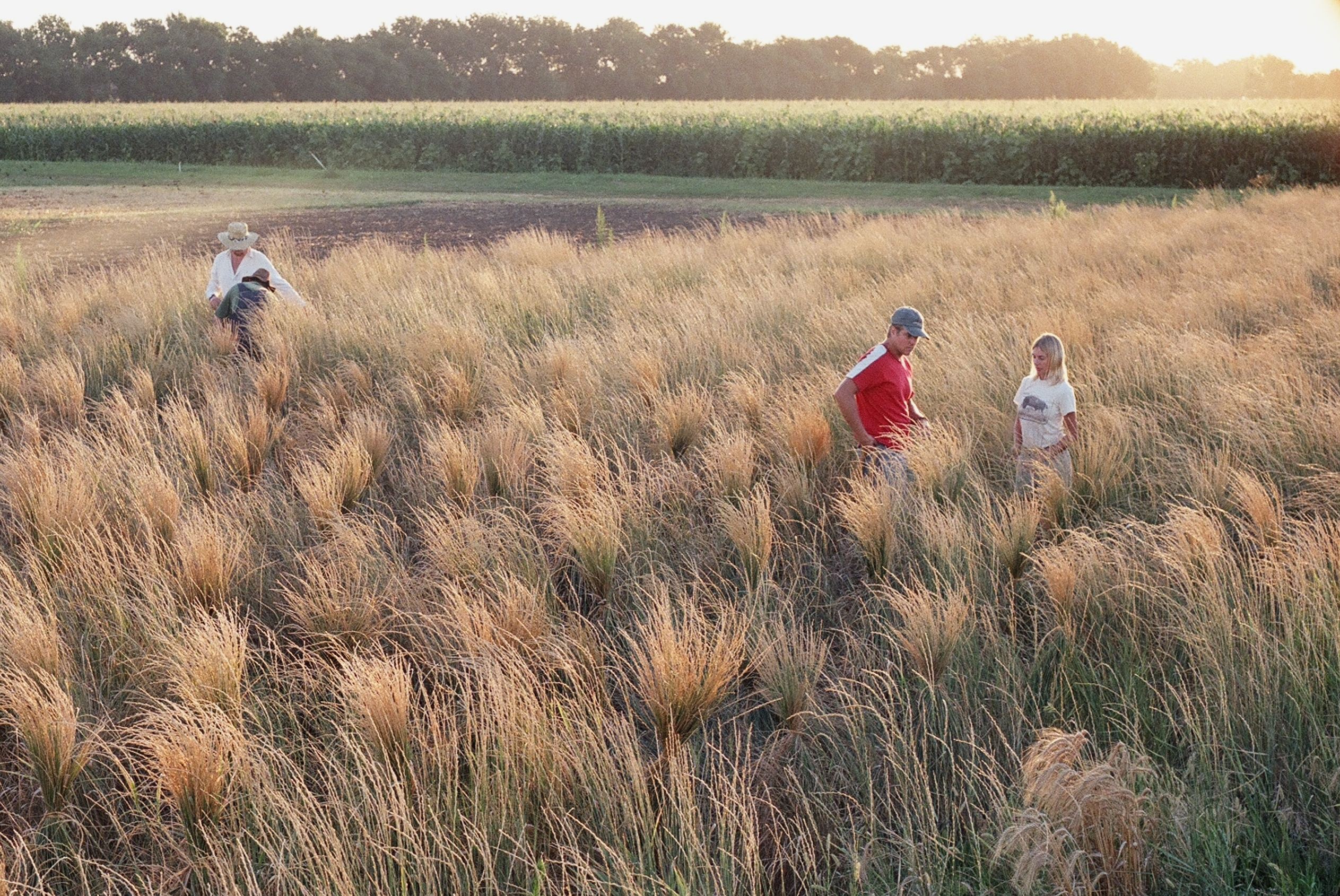
Thinopyrum intermedium harvest. Individual plants of Thinopyrum intermedium are tied into bundles to be cut and threshed in order to select the plants with the highest yield and largest seed.

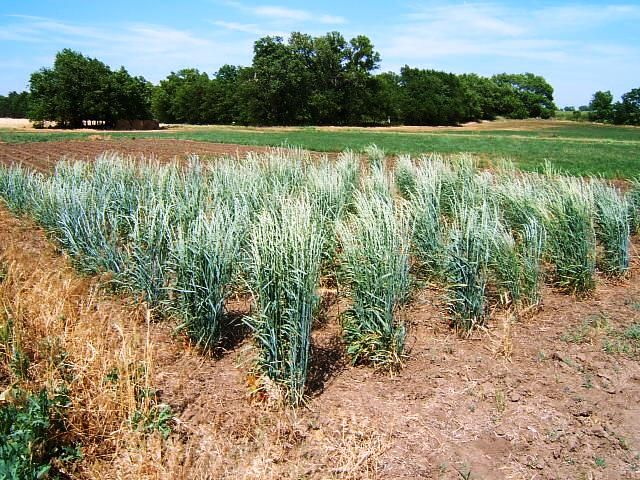
Thinopyrum intermedium crossing block. Thinopyrum intermedium selected for high grain yield and large seed size planted in a crossing block.

The current agricultural system is predominantly composed of herbaceous annuals. Annual systems depend heavily on tilling and chemical applications, like pesticides and fertilizers, and thus contribute to sustainability issues like erosion, eutrophication and fossil fuel use. The development of perennial grains could improve the sustainability of agriculture. In contrast to annual systems, perennial systems involve plants with deep, long lived roots. A perennial system is not dependent on tilling and could reduce the dependence on chemical applications, build soil health, and sequester carbon.

Annual crops have been domesticated for nearly 10,000 years, whereas no commercial perennial grains have yet been developed. It is unclear exactly why perennial grains were not domesticated alongside annual grains during the agricultural revolution. Annuals may have been more predisposed to domestication for several reasons. For one, wild annuals were likely easier targets for early domestication efforts because they generally have greater single-year yields than wild perennials. Because the fitness of annual plants depends on the reproductive output of a single year, annuals naturally invest heavily in seed production (typically the product of interest for agriculture). In contrast, perennials have to balance seed production with overwinter survival in any given year and thus tend to produce lower yields per year. Second, annual plants have a shorter generation time, facilitating faster gains through the artificial selection process. Third, early agriculture used tilling to clear fields for the following year's crop and the practice of annual tilling, which clears the soil of existing plants in preparation for new ones, is not compatible with perennial grains. Finally, once annual grains were domesticated there was a reduced incentive to pursue the domestication of new perennial grains.

If the limitations of early domestication efforts explain the lack of perennial grains, there may not be an insurmountable physiological barrier to high yielding perennials. For instance, the trade off between survival and yield in perennials should primarily be observed in the plant's first year when they are establishing root structures. In subsequent years, perennials may actually benefit from having a longer growing season and greater access to soil resources due to pre-established root systems ( which can also reduce reliance on fertilizer). However, even if physiological limitations limit resource allocation to seed production in perennials, their yields may still be comparable to or exceed annual grain yields due to improved resource acquisition and higher overall biomass.

While perennial crop domestication could alleviate some of the sustainability issues caused by reliance on annual crops, the gains may still be fundamentally limited by general agricultural practices. Producing grain on scales large enough to meet the world demand depends on the conversion of massive tracts of native grassland to agriculture, regardless of the perennial or annual nature of the crop.

=== Methods ===
To capitalize on the potential benefits of perennial crop domestication, the domestication process needs to be accelerated. Serious efforts to develop new perennial grains began in the 1980s, largely driven by Wes Jackson and The Land Institute in Salina, Kansas. Approaches to perennial crop development generally fall under three main methods: perennialization, de novo domestication, and genetic manipulation. These methods are not mutually exclusive, can be used in tandem and each present their own challenges.

==== Perennialization ====
Hybridizing existing annual crops with perennial wild relative is a common approach to perennial crop development. This approach aims to conserve the important agronomic traits that have been developed in annual grain crops while converting the plant to a perennial life cycle with well-developed long-lived root systems. However, perennialization is not without challenges.

For one, plants produced through hybridization are often infertile so successful breeding of plants beyond the F1, or initial hybrid generation is rare. Second, perennial traits are often polygenic (controlled by multiple genes) so conferral of a perennial lifecycle to domesticated annual crops depends on a full suite of genes being transferred to the hybrid offspring from the perennial parent. In contrast, yield traits are generally less polygenic so single genes can have positive effects on yield. Thus, perennial crop development through hybridization may be more effective if the goal of hybridization is to introduce increased yield to perennials rather than introducing perenniality to annual crops.

==== Accelerated domestication ====
Accelerated domestication (also called de novo domestication) of perennial wild plants provides another avenue for perennial crop development. This approach involves selection of wild herbaceous perennials based on their domestication potential, followed by artificial selection for agronomically important traits like yield, seed shattering (the tendency of seeds to fall off the plant or stay attached until harvest), free-threshing seeds (the tendency of seeds to easily detach from the chaff) and plant height. Pipelines for domestication, like those developed by researchers at The Land Institute, have established criteria for evaluating the potential of candidate species to be successful for domestication programs—e.g. high variability and heritability of agronomically important traits—and also guide what traits should be focused on during breeding efforts. Extensive lists of potential candidate species can be found in Wagoner & Schaeffer and Cox et al.

Domesticating new perennial species has a couple of major drawbacks. For one, wild perennial grains have very low yearly yields compared to domesticated annuals so breeding efforts have to make up a lot of ground before perennial grains are commercially viable. This problem is exacerbated by the fact that many candidate species are polyploid (i.e. they have extra sets of genetic material). Polyploidy makes it harder to breed undesirable alleles out of the population and create uniform plants that grow and mature simultaneously for easy harvest.

==== Genetic methods ====
Several genetic methods can help the perennial crop development process. Genomic selection, a method of predicting plant traits based on analysis of their genome, shows promise as a method to accelerate selection of plants in domestication programs. If adult plant phenotypes can be predicted from the genomes of young plants, plants can be artificially selected at an earlier age, reducing time and resources needed to identify individuals with desirable traits. Transgenics and gene altering can add or target "domestication genes" and their orthologs (genes with similar sequences and functions) in perennial plants. Domestication genes have known effects on traits that are relevant to domestication, and have been discovered in annual crop species. Genome sequencing indicates that many orthologs also exist in perennial species that may be useful targets for genetic alteration.

Current applications of genetic manipulation are limited because the genomes of many candidate species have not been sequenced. Furthermore, methods of genetic manipulation have not yet been optimized in most candidate species. Despite these limitations, there have been rapid gains in the development of genetic techniques and these methods are likely to be a useful aid for the development of perennial crops in years to come.

== Advantages ==
Several claims have been published:

1. Greater access to resources through a longer season.Perennial plants typically emerge earlier than annuals in the spring and go dormant in the autumn well after annual plants have died. The longer growing season allows greater interception of sunlight and rainfall. For example, In Minnesota, annual soybean seedlings emerge from the soil in early June. By this time perennial alfalfa has grown so much that it is ready for the first harvest. Therefore, by the time a soybean crop has just begun to photosynthesize, a field of alfalfa has already produced about 40% of the season's production.
2. Greater access to resources through a deeper rooting zone. Most long—lived plants construct larger, deeper root systems than short-lived plants adapted to the same region . Deeper roots enable perennials to "mine" a larger volume of soil each year. A larger volume of soil also available for exploitation per unit of cropland also means a larger volume of soil water serves as a reservoir for periods without rainfall.
3. More efficient use of soil nutrients. Leaching of nitrogen from fertilizer has been found to be much lower under perennial crops such as alfalfa (lucerne) than annual crops such as maize. A similar phenomenon is seen in unfertilized fields harvested for wild hay. While adjacent wheat fields required annual inputs of fertilizer, the wild perennial grasses continued to produce nitrogen-rich hay for 75 to 100 years with no appreciable decline in productivity or soil fertility. Presumably, the larger root systems of the perennial plants and the microbial community they support intercept and cycle nutrients passing through the system much more efficiently than do the ephemeral root systems of crop plants.
4. Sustainable production on marginal lands. Cassman et al. (2003) wrote that for large areas in poor regions of the world, "annual cereal cropping …is not likely to be sustainable over the longer term because of severe erosion risk. Perennial crops and agroforestry systems are better suited to these environments." Current perennial crops and agroforestry systems do not produce grain. Grain provides greater food security than forage or fruit because it can be eaten directly by humans (unlike forage) and it can be stored (unlike fruit) for consumption during the winter or dry season.
5. Reduced Soil erosion U.S. Forest Service et al. cite perennial grasses as a preventative for soil erosion. Perennials of all kinds establish thick root systems which tie up soil and prevent surface erosion by wind and water. Since water runoff is slowed, it has a longer time to soak in and enter the groundwater system. Net water inflow into streams is marginally reduced due to groundwater infusion, but this also reduces high flow rates in streams associated with fast-flowing water-based erosion of streambeds. .
6. Increased wildlife populations U.S. Forest Service et al. cite slower release of water into streams, which makes water levels more consistent instead of alternating between dry and flash-flood situations common to deserts. Consistent water levels contribute to increased wildlife populations of fish, amphibians, waterfowl, and mammals dependent upon a consistent water source.
7. Reduced weed competition - Minimizing tillage and herbicide applications.
8. Improved soil microbiomes - Perennial grain crops may nurture beneficial soil microbiomes, as the frequent soil disturbance required in annual crop production is disruptive to these microbiomes.
9. Sequester more carbon - It is hypothesized that perennial grains may sequester more carbon, due to better landscape management, and maintaining more cropland in production.

== Potential disadvantages ==
1. Does not address food security today. Perennial grain crops are in the early stages of development and may take many years before achieving yields equivalent to annual grains.
2. Makes crop rotation more difficult. Crop rotations with perennial systems are possible, but the full rotation will necessarily take longer. For example, a perennial hay crop like alfalfa is commonly rotated with annual crops or other perennial hay crops after 3–5 years. The slower pace of rotation—compared with annual crops—could allow a greater buildup of pathogens, pests or weeds in the perennial phase of the rotation.
3. Builds soil organic matter at the expense of plant productivity. In the absence of tillage, and in soils with depleted organic matter, crops with large root systems may build up organic matter to the point that nearly all of the soil nitrogen and phosphorus is immobilized. When this happens, productivity may decline until either the organic matter builds up to a level where equilibrium is reached between nutrient mineralization and nutrient immobilization or fertilizer is added to the system.
4. Hydrological impacts. Perennial plants may intercept and utilize more of the incoming rainfall. than annual plants each year. This may result in water tables dropping and/or reduced surface flow to rivers.
5. Reduced nutrient delivery to downstream farms. Wide replacement of annual with perennial plants on agricultural landscapes could stabilize soils and reduce nitrate leaching to the point that the delivery of sediment and dissolved nitrogen to downstream landscapes could be reduced. Farmers in these areas may currently rely on these nutrient inputs. On the other hand, other sectors might benefit from improved water quality.
6. Improved habitat for pests. If fields are not left bare for a portion of the year, rodents and insects populations may increase. Burning of the stubble of perennial grains could reduce these populations, but burning may not be permitted in some areas. Furthermore, rodents and insects living underground would survive burning, whereas tillage disrupts their habitat.

== Perennial grains in the marketplace ==
Kernza, an intermediate wheatgrass, has been under development for use as a grain crop since the 1980s. Since 2001, the nonprofit organization The Land Institute's Dr. Lee DeHaan has led development of the crop, coining the trademarked name Kernza in 2009.

Recently, work on Kernza has rapidly expanded to include more than 25 lead scientists in diverse fields working on three continents. This international team has developed growing techniques and dramatically improved traits such as shatter resistance, seed size and yield, enabling the crop to now be produced and marketed at a small scale. US Institutional Kernza research partners now include the University of Minnesota, the University of Wisconsin, Madison, Cornell University, Ohio State, Kansas State, and numerous international universities in Canada and Europe, including the University of Minnesota, Lund University, and ISARA.

As the first perennial grain crop grown across the northern United States, researchers hope that Kernza will help dramatically shift agriculture practice, making croplands multifunctional through the production of both food and ecosystem services.

The Land Institute developed the registered trademark for Kernza grain to help identify intermediate wheatgrass grain that is certified as a perennial using the most advanced types of T. intermedium seed.

The cultivar of perennial rice 23 (PR23) is used for a new rice production system that is based on no-tillage.

== See also ==
- Perennial rice
- Perennial sunflower
- Thinopyrum intermedium
- Plant breeding
- Food grain
- Subsistence agriculture
- De novo domestication
