= Oryza brachyantha =

Conservation status
- Least Concern (IUCN 3.1)

Scientific classification
- Kingdom: Plantae
- Clade: Embryophytes
- Clade: Tracheophytes
- Clade: Angiosperms
- Clade: Monocots
- Clade: Commelinids
- Order: Poales
- Family: Poaceae
- Genus: Oryza
- Species: O. brachyantha

Binomial name
- Oryza brachyantha A.Chev. & Roehr.

Synonyms
- Oryza brachyantha var. guineensis A.Chev. Oryza guineensis A.Chev.

Species of grass

Oryza brachyantha is a grass in the rice genus Oryza, distantly related to cultivated rice O. sativa, and native to tropical Africa. It is an annual grass that grows as a tuft.

The genome of O. brachyantha has been sequenced.
