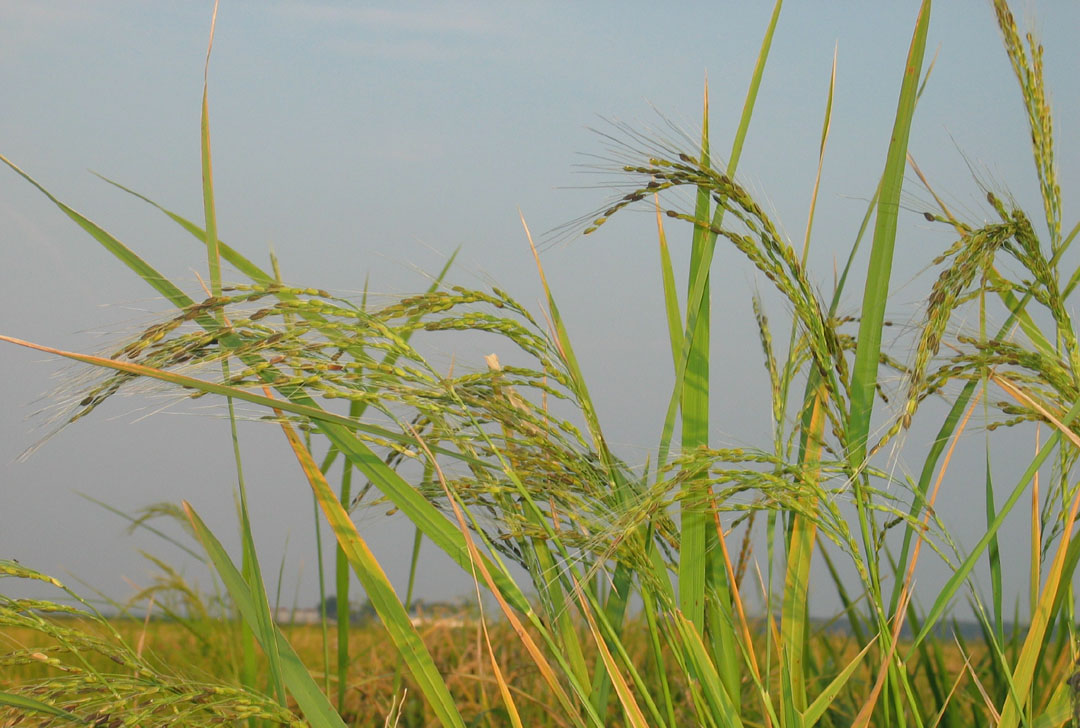

Scientific classification
- Kingdom: Plantae
- Clade: Tracheophytes
- Clade: Angiosperms
- Clade: Monocots
- Clade: Commelinids
- Order: Poales
- Family: Poaceae
- Subfamily: Oryzoideae
- Tribe: Oryzeae
- Subtribe: Oryzinae
- Genus: Oryza; L.

Type species
- Oryza sativa L.

Synonyms
- Padia Moritzi; Porteresia Tateoka; Indoryza A.N.Henry & B.Roy

= Oryza =

Genus of plants

Oryza is a genus of plants in the grass family. It includes the major food crop rice (species Oryza sativa and Oryza glaberrima). Members of the genus grow as tall, wetland grasses, growing to 1–2 metres (3–7 ft) tall; the genus includes both annual and perennial species.

Oryza is situated in tribe Oryzeae, which is characterized morphologically by its single-flowered spikelets whose glumes are almost completely suppressed. In Oryza, two sterile lemma simulate glumes. The tribe Oryzeae is in subfamily Ehrhartoideae, a group of Poaceae tribes with certain features of internal leaf anatomy in common. The species are divided into two subgroups within the genus.

Asian rice (O. sativa), provides 20% of global grain and is a food crop of major global importance.

== Species ==
Inside the genus Oryza, species can be divided by their genomes types (listed after each species name below). They include the diploid (2n = 24) AA of cultivated rice and their relatives, BB, CC, EE, FF and GG as well as the tetraploid (4n = 48) BBCC, CCDD, HHJJ, HHKK and KKLL. Species of the same genome type cross easily, while hybridizing different types requires techniques like embryo rescue.

Over 300 names have been proposed for species, subspecies, and other infraspecific taxa within the genus. Published sources disagree as to how many of these should be recognized as distinct species. The following follows the World Checklist maintained by Kew Garden in London.

- Oryza australiensis Domin (EE) – Australia
- Oryza barthii A.Chev. (AA) – tropical Africa
- Oryza brachyantha A.Chev. & Roehr. (FF) – tropical Africa
- Oryza coarctata Roxb. (KKLL) – India, Pakistan, Bangladesh, Myanmar
- Oryza eichingeri Peter (CC) – tropical Africa, Sri Lanka
- Oryza glaberrima Steud. (AA) – African rice – tropical Africa
- Oryza grandiglumis (Döll) Prodoehl (CCDD) – Brazil, Venezuela, Fr Guiana, Colombia, Peru, Bolivia
- Oryza latifolia Desv. (CCDD) – Latin America + West Indies from Sinaloa + Cuba to Argentina
- Oryza longiglumis Jansen (HHJJ) – New Guinea
- Oryza longistaminata A.Chev. & Roehr. (AA) – Madagascar, tropical + southern Africa
- Oryza meyeriana (Zoll. & Moritzi) Baill. (GG) – China, Indian Subcontinent, Southeast Asia
- Oryza minuta J.Presl (BBCC) – Himalayas, Southeast Asia, New Guinea, Northern Territory of Australia
- Oryza neocaledonica Morat (GG) – New Caledonia
- Oryza officinalis Wall. ex Watt (CC) – China, Indian Subcontinent, Southeast Asia, New Guinea, Australia
- Oryza punctata Kotschy ex Steud. (BB) – Madagascar, tropical + southern Africa
- Oryza ridleyi Hook.f. (HHJJ) – Southeast Asia, New Guinea
- Oryza rufipogon Griff. (AA) – brownbeard or red rice – China, Indian Subcontinent, Southeast Asia, New Guinea, Australia
- Oryza sativa L. (AA) – Asian rice – China, Indian Subcontinent, Southeast Asia; naturalized many places
- Oryza schlechteri Pilg. (HHKK) – New Guinea

=== Formerly included ===
Other species from the genera below were previously included within Orzya but have been transferred to other genera after taxonomic revisions.

- Leersia
- Maltebrunia
- Potamophila
- Prosphytochloa
- Rhynchoryza

== See also ==
- Specialized metabolism in Oryza
