= Wes Jackson =

American geneticist (born 1936)

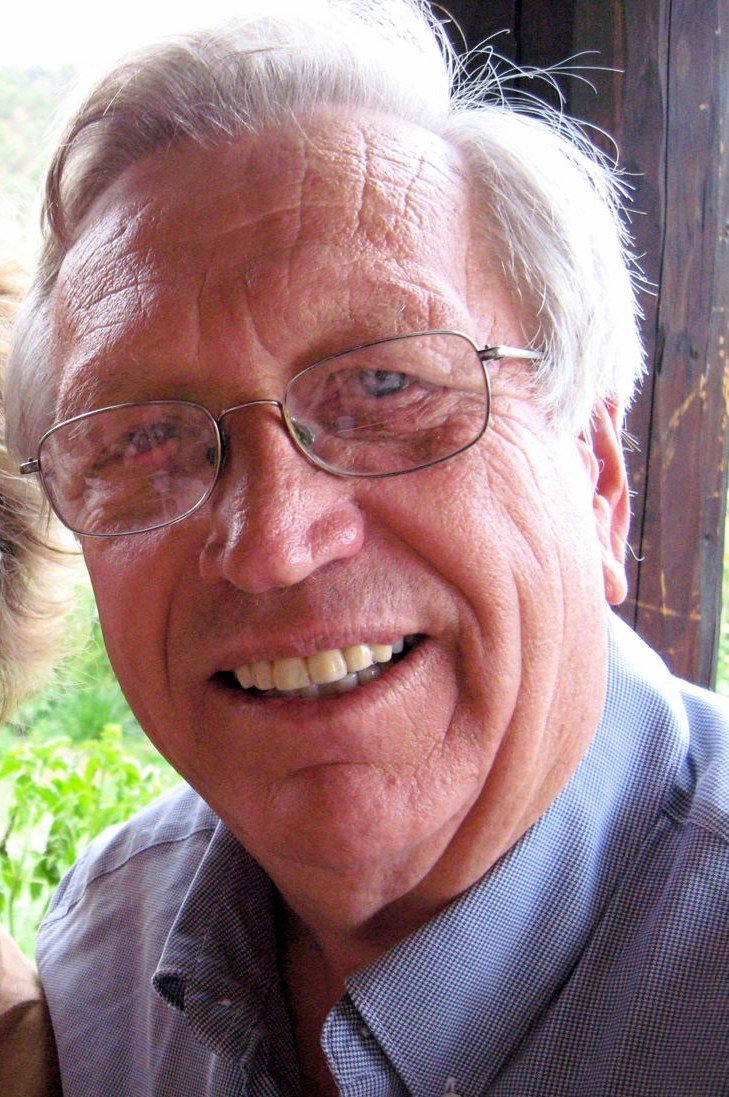
- Wes Jackson
- Born: 15 June 1936 (age 90); Topeka, Kansas
- Education: Kansas Wesleyan University; University of Kansas; North Carolina State University
- Awards: Pew Conservation Scholar (1990); MacArthur Fellow (1992); Right Livelihood Award (2000)
- Scientific career
- Fields: Agronomy; Agriculture; Genetics
- Workplaces: The Land Institute; California State University Sacramento

Wes Jackson (born 1936) is an American geneticist who co-founded the Land Institute with Dana Jackson. He is also a member of the World Future Council.

== Early life and education ==
Jackson was born and raised on a farm near Topeka, Kansas. After earning a BA in biology from Kansas Wesleyan University, an MA in botany from the University of Kansas, and a PhD in genetics from North Carolina State University. Wes Jackson established and served as chair of one of the United States' first environmental studies programs at California State University, Sacramento.

Jackson then chose to leave academia, returning to his native Kansas, where he founded a non-profit organization, The Land Institute, in 1976. The Land Institute is working to develop perennial grains, pulses, and oilseed-bearing plants to be grown in ecologically intensified, diverse crop mixtures under its Natural Systems Agriculture program. In tandem with these sustainable agriculture efforts, the Ecosphere Studies program seeks to change the way people think about the world and their place in it, through educational and cultural projects with a perennial perspective. Jackson stepped down from the presidency of The Land Institute in 2016, but still works in the Ecosphere Studies program.

== Work with The Land Institute ==
The Land Institute has explored alternatives in appropriate technology, environmental ethics, and education, but a research program in sustainable agriculture eventually became central to its work. In 1978, Jackson proposed the development of a perennial polyculture. He sought to have fields planted in polycultures, more than one variety of plant in a field, like diverse plants grow together in nature.

Jackson also wanted to use perennials, which would not need to be replanted every year - reducing the need for frequent tillage, preventing erosion, and promoting plant-soil microbe relationships to establish and persist. The Land Institute attempts to breed plants not presently used in agriculture into effective producers of perennial grains in intercropping conditions. Jackson argues that this version of agriculture used "nature as model," and to pursue that end, The Land Institute has studied prairie ecology.

=== Current and future work ===
Now in its fourth decade, The Land Institute is beginning to demonstrate progress in developing the perennial crops called for in the Natural Systems Agriculture model. Programs in wheat, sorghum, and sunflower are generating crop lines displaying both perenniality and agriculturally-significant seed yield.

Research on integrating these new plants into polycultures also continues. The Land Institute is not itself developing machinery suitable for one-pass harvesting of grain polycultures. It instead takes the position that integration of existing materials separation technology into harvesters is a straightforward task, and will be accomplished by public and private agricultural engineers when the demand arrives.

== Author ==
Wes Jackson is the author of several books and is recognized as a leader in the international sustainable agriculture movement. In 1971, Wes Jackson's first efforts to address growing environmental concerns, react to social concerns growing from the civil rights movement and opposition to the Vietnam War, and answer student requests for more relevant materials, resulted in the environmental reader, "Man and the Environment". After leaving academia and establishing the Land Institute, Jackson published New Roots for Agriculture, partially in reaction to a report from the U.S. Government Accountability Office on soil erosion.

This book expanded on ideas presented in a 1978 article, "Towards a Sustainable Agriculture," about looking to natural ecosystems, such as the prairie, to help solve the problem of soil erosion. He collaborated with author Wendell Berry on "Meeting the Expectations of the Land," in response to a Council on Agricultural Science and Technology report on agrochemicals.

Jackson's Becoming Native to This Place, published in 1994, challenges readers to develop a relationship with their ecosystems and further develops the idea of Natural Systems Agriculture. He was a 1990 Pew Conservation Scholar and in 1992 became a MacArthur Fellow. In 2000, he received the Right Livelihood Award "for his single-minded commitment to developing an agriculture that is both highly productive and truly ecologically sustainable." His work is often referred to by author Wendell Berry, with whom Jackson has shared a longtime friendship and correspondence.

== Works ==
Selected Bibliography

Primary Author:

- Man and the Environment (1971) ISBN 978-0-69704-704-5
- New Roots for Agriculture (1980) ISBN 978-0-80327-562-1
- Altars of Unhewn Stone: Science and the Earth (1987) ISBN 978-1-59098-287-7
- Becoming Native to This Place (1994) ISBN 978-1-887178-11-2
- Nature as Measure: The Selected Essays of Wes Jackson (2011) ISBN 978-1-58243-700-2
- Consulting the Genius of the Place: An Ecological Approach to a New Agriculture (2011) ISBN 978-1-58243-780-4
- An Inconvenient Apocalypse: Environmental Collapse, Climate Crisis, and the Fate of Humanity (2022) ISBN 978-0-268-20366-5 Co-authored by Robert Jensen

Contributor:

Rooted in the Land (1996) Contributed essay "Matfield Green" Editor is William Vitek, published in Great Britain

- Meeting the Expectations of the Land: Essays in Sustainable Agriculture and Stewardship (1984), Editor
- Soil and Survival: Land Stewardship and the Future of American Agriculture (1986), Introduction by
- From the Land: Articles Compiled from the Land 1941-1954 (1988), Introduction by
- Farming in Nature's Image: An Ecological Approach to Agriculture (1991), Foreword by
- Life on the Dry Line: Working the Land, 1902-1944 (1992), Foreword by
- From the Good Earth: A Celebration of Growing Food Around the World (1993), Foreword by
- The Ecology of Hope: Communities Collaborate for Sustainability (1996), Foreword by
- Protecting Public Health and the Environment: Implementing the Precautionary Principle (1999), Foreword by
- Reclaiming the Commons: Community Farms and Forests in a New England Town (1999), Foreword by
- Wendell Berry: Life and Work (2007), Essay
- The Virtues of Ignorance: Complexity, Sustainability, and the Limits of Knowledge (2008), Editor
- American Georgics: Writings on Farming, Culture and the Land (2011), Foreword by

== Quotes ==
- "If we don't get sustainability in agriculture first, sustainability will not happen."
- "By beginning to make agriculture sustainable we will have taken the first step forward for humanity to begin to measure progress by its independence from the extractive economy."
- "Ecosystem agriculturalists will take advantage of huge chunks of what works. They will be taking advantage of the natural integrities of ecosystems worked out over the millennia."
- "If you are working on something you can finish in your lifetime, you’re not thinking big enough."

== See also ==
- Agrarianism
- Local food
- No-till farming
- Polyculture
- Sustainable agriculture
- Yoshikazu Kawaguchi
