= Specialized metabolism in Oryza =

Type of metabolism in some grasses

Oryza is a genus in the plant family Poaceae, of which Oryza sativa (cultivated rice) is a member. Oryza is a genus of 24 species, most of which are annual and some perennial grasses, which are found in tropical and swampy parts of Africa, Asia and Australia. Given its wide geographic range, there exists a substantial diversity of specialized metabolites (also called secondary metabolites) in the genus Oryza. Understanding this diversity can provide us solutions for mitigate crop losses due to disease and pest damage in rice, and boost agricultural production.

== Anthocyanins and flavonols ==
- Cyanidin 3-O-glucoside (I): Produced by purple pigmented rice
- Malvidin: Produced by purple pigmented rice
- Tricin
- Quercitin
- Kaempferol
- Apigenin

== Carotenoids- ==
- β-carotene (provitamin A)
- Lutein
- zeaxanthin

== Alkaloids ==
- Benzoxazinoids
- Quinolone alkaloids

== Phytoalexins ==
- Sakuranetin: Increases rapidly under biotic and abiotic stress stimula including UV and pathogen attack.
- Naringenin

== Volatiles ==
Metabolite(s)	Comments
2-acetyl-1-pyrroline	Responsible for the aroma of basmati rice
(Z)-3-hexenal	Defense signal

== Hormones ==
- Ethylene
- Salicylate
- Jasmonate
- Auxins
- Cytokinins
- Gibberelins
- Abscisic acids
- Brassinosteroids
- Strigolactones (e.g.: 2′-epi-5-deoxystrigol, which is produced under phosphorus-deficient conditions)

== See also ==
- Phytochemistry
