= Oryza coarctata =

Scientific classification
- Kingdom: Plantae
- Clade: Embryophytes
- Clade: Tracheophytes
- Clade: Angiosperms
- Clade: Monocots
- Clade: Commelinids
- Order: Poales
- Family: Poaceae
- Genus: Oryza
- Species: O. coarctata

Binomial name
- Oryza coarctata Roxb.

Synonyms
- Indoryza coarctata (Roxb.) A.N.Henry & B.Roy; Oryza triticoides Griff.; Porteresia coarctata (Roxb.) Tateoka; Sclerophyllum coarctatum (Roxb.) Griff.

Species of grass

Oryza coarctata, synonym Porteresia coarctata, is a species of grass which is related to other rice species in the Oryzeae botanical tribe, part of the family Poaceae. It is native to Pakistan, India, Bangladesh, and Myanmar. It is a perennial species that shows substantial underground rhizomatous growth. The rhizome tissues give out aerial shoots in a favourable season.

Oryza coarctata is a form of wild rice that grows in saline estuaries and is harvested and eaten as a delicacy. The plant is salt-tolerant, and is seen as a possibly important source of salt-tolerance genes for transfer to other rice species. It is closely related to Oryza australiensis. The leaves of this species secrete salt through special microhair like structures that have three distinct morphotypes, and a method to isolate these structures has been developed. The rhizomes store a significant amount of salt and also control the flow of salt to the developing shoots.
