= Wild Rice River =

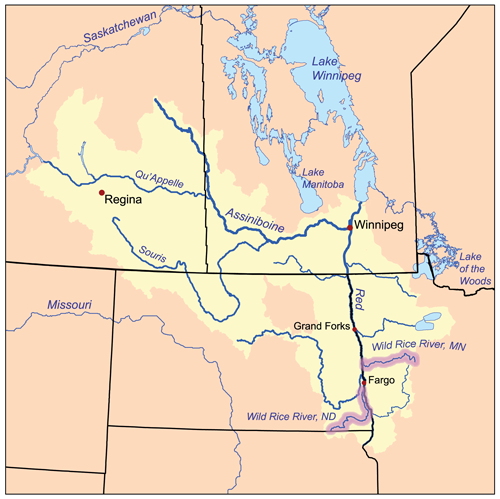
The Red River drainage basin, with both Wild Rice rivers highlighted

Wild Rice River may refer to either of two tributaries of the Red River of the North, which forms the border of Minnesota and North Dakota and flows into Manitoba, Canada:

- Wild Rice River (Minnesota)
- Wild Rice River (North Dakota)
