= The Land Institute =

American nonprofit organization

Coordinates: 38°46′08″N 97°33′08″W

- Formation: 1 August 1976
- Founders: Wes Jackson, Dana Jackson
- Type: Nonprofit organization
- Tax ID no.: 48-0842156
- Purpose: Agricultural and social research
- Headquarters: Salina, Kansas
- Location: 2440 E. Water Well Rd, Salina, Kansas 67401
- President: Rachel Stroer
- Chief Scientist: Tim Crews
- Chief Communications Officer: Tammy Kimbler
- Chief Operating Officer: Tracie Thomas
- Board of directors: Chairperson of the Board
- Key people: Ruth Anne French-Hodson
- Budget: $10 million USD (2023)
- Revenue: $10 million USD (2023)
- Staff: 75 (2023)
- Website: landinstitute.org

The Land Institute is an American nonprofit research, education, and policy organization dedicated to sustainable agriculture, based in Salina, Kansas. Their goal is to develop an agricultural system based on perennial crops that "has the ecological stability of the prairie and a grain yield comparable to that from annual crops".

== History ==
The institute was founded in 1976 by Dana Jackson and plant geneticist and MacArthur "genius grant" recipient Wes Jackson. Dana went on to co-found the Land Stewardship Project in Minnesota.

The Land Institute focused on the development of perennial grain crops and agricultural systems intended to reduce the environmental impacts of conventional farming. It promotes "natural systems agriculture" through plant breeding. Using selective breeding and other techniques, they are working to domesticate wild perennials. The organization's concept of developing perennial crops is modeled after the ecological design of prairies, which are known for their soil quality, deep root systems, and self-sufficiency. In an interview, Wes Jackson called the concept "an inversion of industrial agriculture." Perennial polyculture systems may have a variety of benefits over conventional annual monocultures such as increased biodiversity, reduced soil erosion, and reduced inputs of irrigation, fossil fuels, fertilizers, and pesticides. Perennial crops also show promise in root-based carbon sequestration. The organization's achievement of productive and genetically stable perennial crop plants for use by farmers is expected to take several decades. Critics note the future economic challenge in profitably practicing perennial polyculture.

Since 1979, The Land Institute has annually hosted its Prairie Festival, which includes lectures, art displays, tours, and music performances.

== Kernza ==
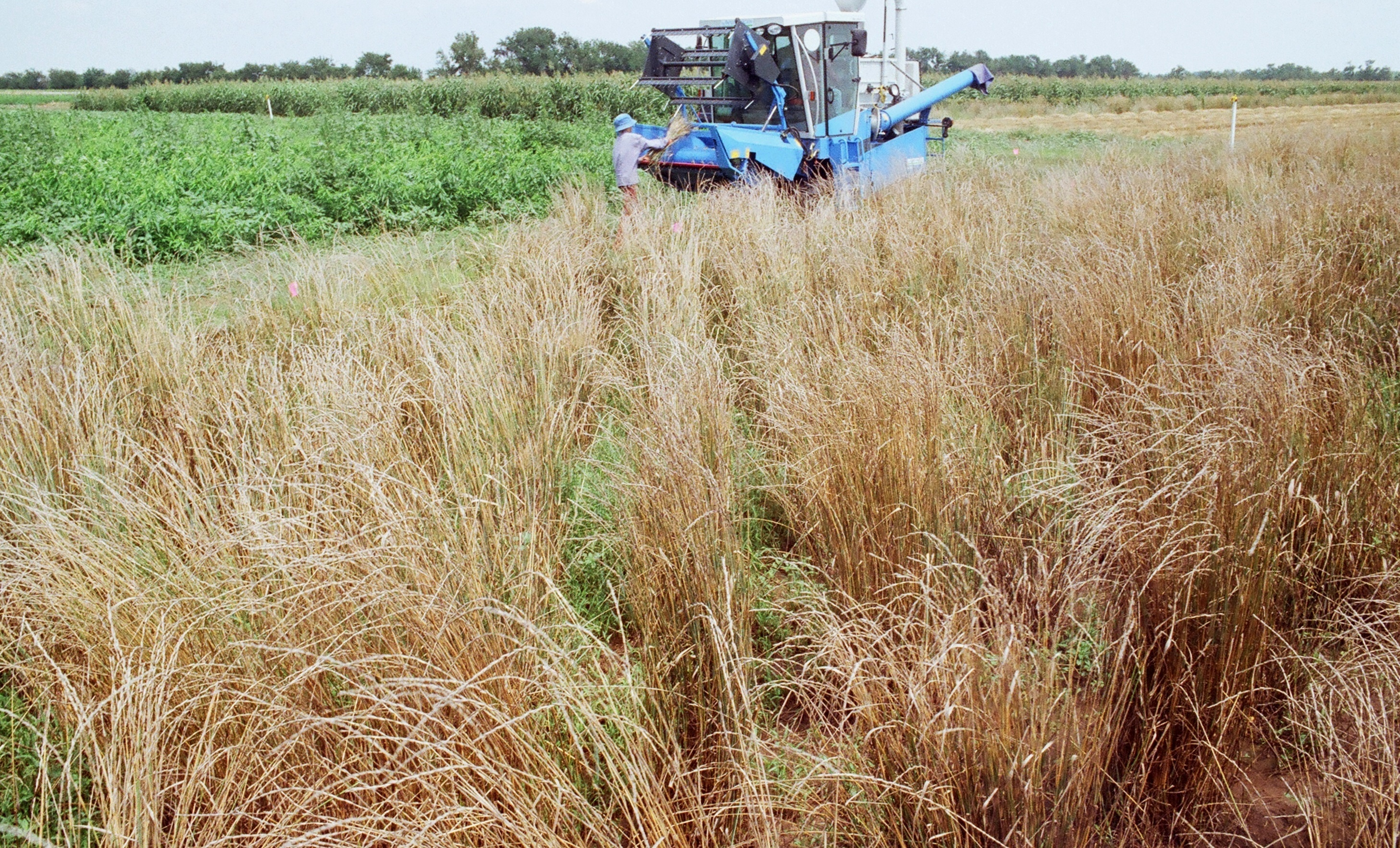
Harvesting a Thinopyrum intermedium breeding nursery at The Land Institute

Kernza, an intermediate wheatgrass developed by The Land Institute, is the first commercial perennial grain crop grown across the northern United States. A perennial grain is a grain crop that lives and remains productive for three or more years. Rather than growing for only one season before harvest, like most grains and annual crops, perennial grains grow year after year. After two decades of plant breeding over 11 cycles, The Land Institute has domesticated a form of wheatgrass whose seeds are two to three times bigger than those of its wild ancestor. Under ideal conditions, it can provide as much as 30 percent of the yield of traditional wheat. They call their trademarked creation Kernza—an amalgamation of "kernel" and "Kansas".

The University of Minnesota has one of the largest Kernza breeding programs in the country. Scientists at the University are selectively breeding the plant to improve some of the current issues, particularly those concerning yields. Their "Forever Green Initiative" has attracted interest from large agricultural producers like General Mills and also smaller local food shops like the Birchwood Cafe.

The General Mills brand Cascadian Farm has incorporated Kernza into some of its foods, with the first Kernza cereal produced in 2019. Cascadian Farm agreed to purchase an initial amount of the perennial grain, which is driving farmers to plant on commercial-scale fields versus the test sized plots currently being grown.

=== Products ===
Kernza breeding has dramatically increased seed size and production, hastening the timeline of commercialization, and resulting in the release of the first widely-available Kernza product, Long Root Ale from Patagonia Provisions, in 2016. The initiative and investment on the part of Patagonia Provisions to bring Long Root Ale to market led to other partnerships and potential Kernza products becoming more widely available to consumers. Currently, there are a number of restaurants serving products made with Kernza, including Birchwood Cafe in Minneapolis, Cafe Gratitude in the Los Angeles metro, and Avalanche Pizza in Athens, Ohio.

After the Birchwood Cafe received a 50-pound bag of grain from the University of Minnesota researchers they began baking crackers, pancakes, tortillas, and puffed grain desserts.

Hopworks Urban Brewery in Portland, Oregon, and Vancouver, Washington, brewed Long Root Ale for Patagonia Provisions and has it on tap, in addition to the ale in four-pack cans being sold in Whole Foods in California. Bang! Brewing in St. Paul, Minnesota, has a Kernza beer available, as does Blue Skye Brewery nearby in Salina, Kansas. Dogfish Head Brewery in Delaware brews another Patagonia Provisions beer and a Grateful Dead branded Juicy Pale Ale, both using Kernza. Innovative Dumpling & Strand produces Kernza pasta that they retail through Twin Cities-area farmers' markets. The Minneapolis based Fair State Brewing Cooperative partnered with Northern outfitter Askov Finlayson in 2018 to produce Keep the North Cold, a golden ale brewed with Kernza.

Since at least 2023 the Weaver Street Market cooperative grocery store chain based in Carrboro, North Carolina has baked and sold a bread—marketed as Kernza Bread—made partially from Kernza flour.

In 2024 Patagonia Provisions released a line of durum wheat and Kernza pasta.

=== Ecological benefits and drawbacks ===
With perennial soil cover such as that provided by Kernza, farmers stand to greatly reduce soil erosion, potentially turning agriculture into a soil-forming ecosystem, much like the natural ecosystems it replaced. Initial research suggests that due to extensive perennial roots, Kernza and other perennial crops may nurture beneficial soil microbiomes. The frequent soil disturbance required in annual crop production is disruptive to these microbiomes.

Deeper and more abundant root systems drive healthy soil. Scientific evidence documenting the ecosystem benefits of Kernza is accumulating. Research from other perennial systems such as pastures and perennial biofuel crops provide robust evidence of the potential benefits of a perennial grain like Kernza.

For example, Paustian and colleagues published in 2016 a paper in Nature titled "Climate-Smart Soils" that compares different landscape management approaches for increasing soil carbon sequestration. It is clear from their analysis that perennial grains would be a game-changer, as they could sequester carbon and maintain more cropland in production better than any alternative. Kernza, however, still only makes 1/3 as much grain per acre as wheat, requiring much larger land plots to create comparable yields to non-regenerative grains.

== Appearances in published works ==
The Land Institute's work was featured in Michael Pollan's New York Times best-seller The Omnivore's Dilemma: A Natural History of Four Meals. The general modus operandi of developing a sustainable, high yield, low labor, agricultural model based on the culturation of crop polycultures, developed by The Land Institute forms the substance of the chapter "How Will We Feed Ourselves?" in Janine Benyus's book, Biomimicry: Innovation Inspired by Nature.

== See also ==
- Plant breeding
