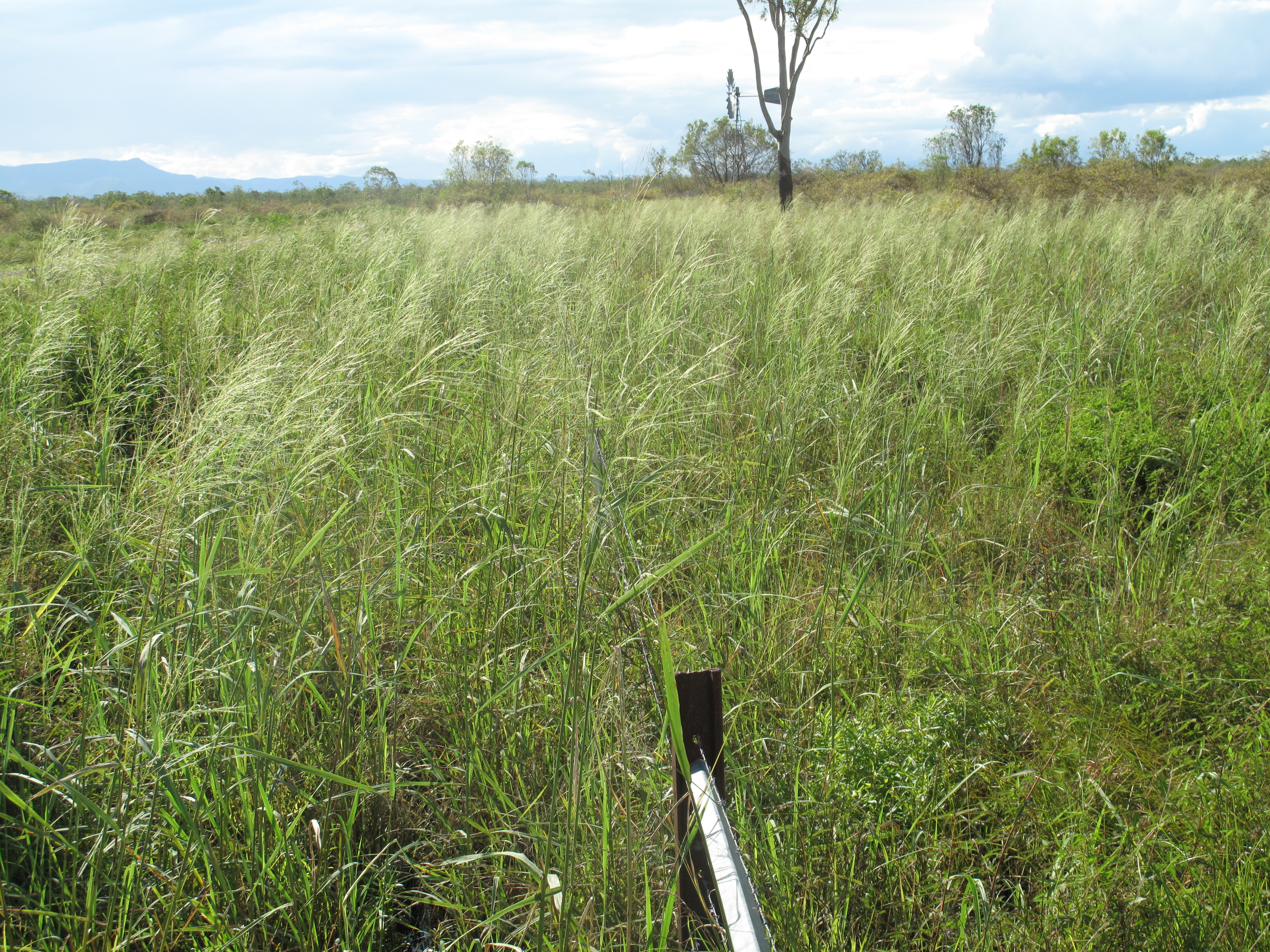
- Wild plants near Townsville

Conservation status
- Least Concern (IUCN 3.1)

Scientific classification
- Kingdom: Plantae
- Clade: Embryophytes
- Clade: Tracheophytes
- Clade: Angiosperms
- Clade: Monocots
- Clade: Commelinids
- Order: Poales
- Family: Poaceae
- Genus: Oryza
- Species: O. australiensis

Binomial name
- Oryza australiensis (Domin, 1915)
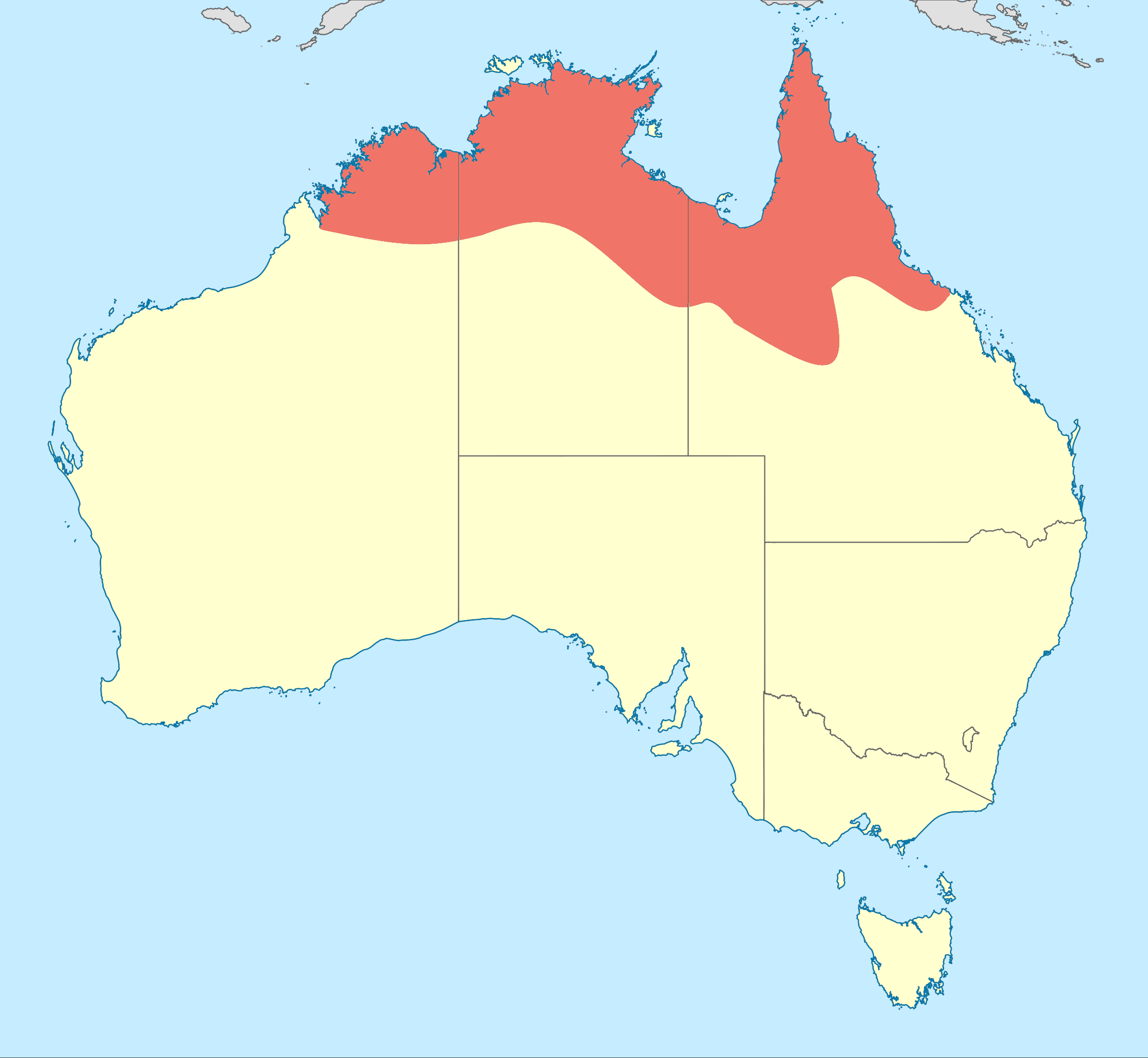
- Distribution of O. australiensis

= Oryza australiensis =

Species of grass

Oryza australiensis is a wild rice species native to monsoonal northern Australia. Also known as Australian rice or Australian Wild Rice, it is a perennial plant that uses the C3 photosynthesis pathway. O. australiensis is unique among other Oryza for its resistance to abiotic stresses, particularly from heat, and having the largest genome in the genus.

== Description ==
Appearance wise, O. australiensis is categorised as long paddy rice with short grain. It is a perennial (lives for longer than 2 years), rhizomatous type of grass. It has straight culms, which are between 0.8 metres (2.6 ft) and 2.5 metres (8.2 ft) tall. It also has an inflorescence in the form of a panicle that is either open or partially contracted, and between 13 centimetres (5.1 in) and 45 centimetres (18 in) long. Its lemma awns are between 10 millimetres (0.39 in) and 60 millimetres (2.4 in) long. Leave colour varies between either a grey-green or a dark-green colour.

O. australiensis is more slender than domesticated rice, and has a high gelatinization temperature and content of amylose, meaning it doesn't stick together after cooking. Alongside this, it has a higher content of protein than cultigen rice.

== Habitat ==
O. australiensis is a wild relative of other rice species and endemic to the tropical regions of northern Australia. Three other wild Oryza species are distributed across and endemic to northern Australia. Within northern Australia, it is found in wet areas near or on the edge of fresh water. It grows in the open in black, clay, or red loam soil.

Its habitat range experiences periods of heat and dryness, with the specie having developed a tolerance to heat. Heat shock experiments on O. australiensis have found that at 45 °C (113 °F), its ability to properly shoot biomass and leaf elongate was unaffected and soluble sugar concentrations tripled during the period of extreme heat, showing its robust carboxylation capacity and thermal tolerance. This is in contrast to other rice species, such as O. sativa, who didn't handle the heat as well as O. australiensis. This is due to the plant's RuBisCO activase enzymes, which is thermally stable up to 42 °C (108 °F). Other resistance to abiotic stresses include tolerance to salinity stress. O. australiensis also has developed drought resistance, where photosynthesis efficiency was not affected by stress caused from drought conditions. It may contain a large number of novel stress responsive genes. It survives the dry season through its rhizomes. Due to its habitat and adaptions, the species has been described as an extremophile. O. australiensis' resistance to abiotic stresses has also led to it being used in breeding programs. It also carries genes that help it resist diseases, bacterial blights and insects such as brown planthoppers (BHP).

== Genetics ==
O. australiensis is the only known member of the EE genome clade, and its genome is estimated to be 965 mega-base pairs (Mbp). Its genome is in some cases double the size of other rice species, such as O. sativa ssp. japonica. Its size is due to long terminal repeat retrotransposon (LTR-RTs) families, which make up around 65% of its genome. This accumulation of over 90,000 LTR-RTs occurred within the last three million years after speciation. O. australiensis thus then has the largest genome within the genus Oryza.
