= Oryza barthii =

Conservation status
- Least Concern (IUCN 3.1)

Scientific classification
- Kingdom: Plantae
- Clade: Tracheophytes
- Clade: Angiosperms
- Clade: Monocots
- Clade: Commelinids
- Order: Poales
- Family: Poaceae
- Genus: Oryza
- Species: O. barthii

Binomial name
- Oryza barthii A.Chev.
- The range of Oryza barthii.

Synonyms
- Oryza breviligulata A.Chev. & Roehr. nom. illeg.; Oryza glaberrima subsp. barthii (A.Chev.) De Wet; Oryza mezii Prodoehl; Oryza perennis subsp. barthii (A.Chev.) A.Chev.; Oryza stapfii Roshev.

Species of grass

Oryza barthii, also called Barth's rice, wild rice, or African wild rice, is a grass in the rice genus Oryza. It is an annual, erect to semierect grass. It has leaves with a short ligule (<13 millimetres (33/64 in)), and panicles that are compact to open, rarely having secondary branching. The inflorescence structure are large spikelets, 7.7–12.3 millimetres (39/128–31/64 in) long and 2.3–3.5 millimetres (23/256–35/256 in) wide, with strong awns (up to 20 centimetres (8 in) long), usually red. The inflorescences have anthers 1.5–3 millimetres (15/256–15/128 in) long.

This wild rice grows in sub-Saharan Africa, and is found in mopane or savanna woodland, savanna or fadama. O. barthii grows in deep water, seasonally flooded land, stagnant water, and slowly flowing water or pools; it prefers clay or black cotton soils (vertisol), and is found in open habitats. It is the progenitor of cultivated Oryza glaberrima, African rice.

It has nodal roots hosting nitrogen fixing, photosynthetic strains of Bradyrhizobium.

The sequenced genome of O. barthii was published in 2014. This species is one of the AA species, the domesticated rices and their wild relatives.

== Distribution ==
O. barthii is primarily found in West Africa.
