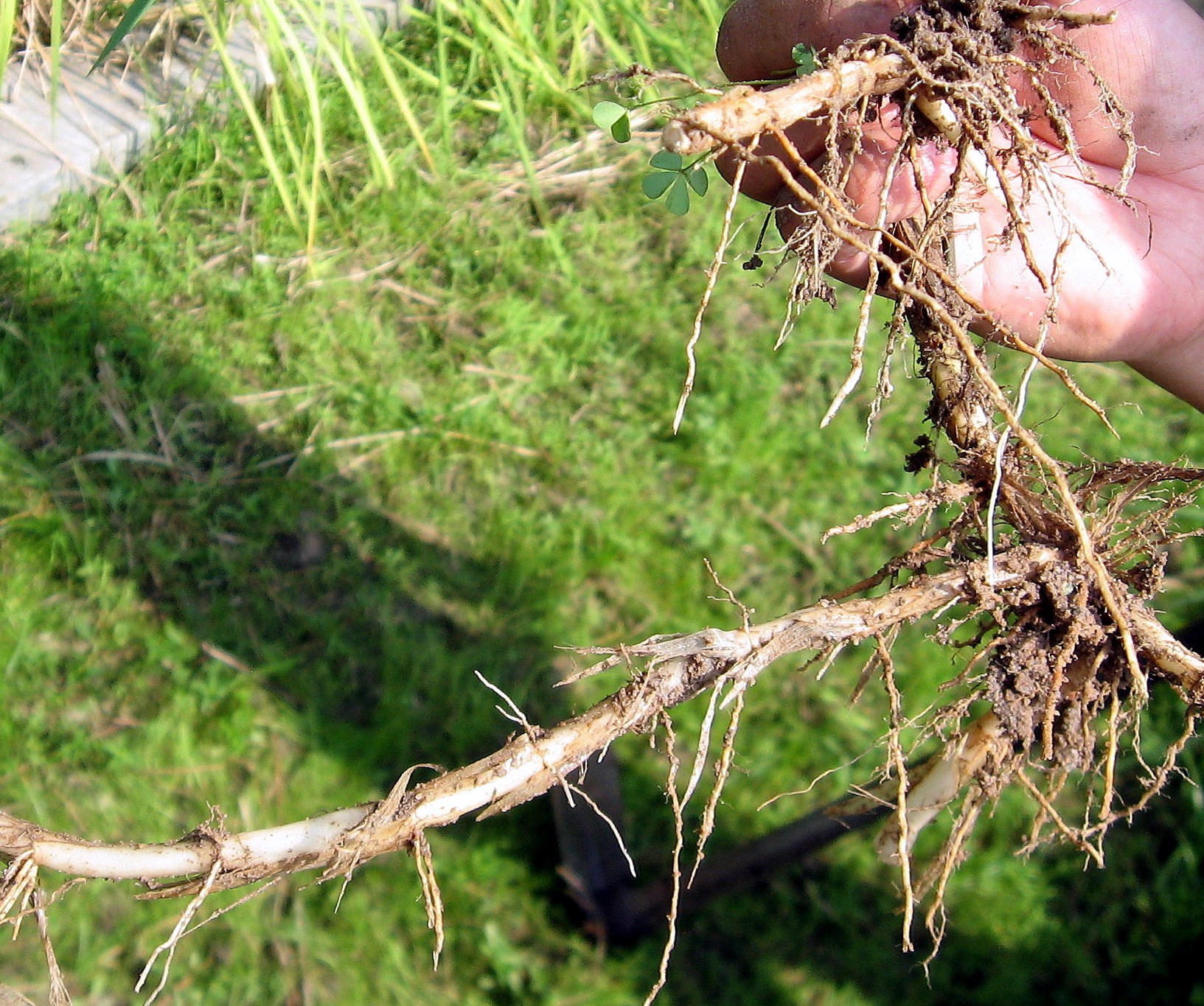

Conservation status
- Least Concern (IUCN 3.1)

Scientific classification
- Kingdom: Plantae
- Clade: Tracheophytes
- Clade: Angiosperms
- Clade: Monocots
- Clade: Commelinids
- Order: Poales
- Family: Poaceae
- Genus: Oryza
- Species: O. longistaminata

Binomial name
- Oryza longistaminata A.Chev. & Roehr.

Synonyms
- Oryza dewildemanii Vanderyst; Oryza madagascariensis (A.Chev.) Roshev. Oryza perennis subsp. madagascariensis A.Chev. Oryza silvestris Stapf ex A.Chev. Oryza silvestris f. longiligulata A.Chev.

= Oryza longistaminata =

Species of grass

Oryza longistaminata is a perennial species of grass from the same genus as cultivated rice (O. sativa). It is native to most of sub-Saharan Africa and Madagascar. It has been introduced into the United States, where it is often regarded as a noxious weed. Its common names are longstamen rice and red rice.

The host resistance gene, Xa21, from O. longistaminata, has been integrated into the genome of O. sativa as it confers broad resistance to rice blight disease caused by Xanthomonas oryzae pv. oryzae.

== Distribution ==
O. longistaminata is native throughout Africa.
