= Oryza punctata =

Scientific classification
- Kingdom: Plantae
- Clade: Tracheophytes
- Clade: Angiosperms
- Clade: Monocots
- Clade: Commelinids
- Order: Poales
- Family: Poaceae
- Genus: Oryza
- Species: O. punctata

Binomial name
- Oryza punctata Kotschy ex Steud.

Synonyms
- Oryza schweinfurthiana Prodoehl

Species of grass

Oryza punctata is an annual grass in the rice genus Oryza, also known as red rice, related to cultivated rice O. sativa. O. punctata forms clumps or tussocks from 50–120 cm tall. It is a native to tropical Africa and Madagascar but is also found in Thailand and other parts of Indochina. O. punctata is a weed species in commercial rice growing operations although it appears to be rare in its native range. O. punctata has an IUCN status of least concern. It is not generally eaten or used as fodder by farmers but there is some evidence that it has been used as such during periods of famine. Due to the importance of the crop varieties of rice (Oryza. sativa and O. glaberrima) globally, the evolution of the Oryza genus as a whole has been studied extensively. A lot of information about O. punctata has been elucidated as a secondary benefit to this commercial research. O. punctata evolved some 5 million years ago in the second of two rapid radiation events that occurred in the Oryza L. genus.

== Description ==
Oryza punctata is a caespitose (tussock forming) annual hydrophyte (grows in/on water). The culm base of O. punctata is spongy and greater than 4 mm in diameter. The culm is glabrous (smooth and without hairs) and striate (parallel longitudinal grooves); it is erect or geniculately (bent like a knee) ascending and from 50–120 cm tall with 3–5 nodes. The leaf sheath is scarious, often spongy, aerenchymous (spongy tissue that forms spaces of air channels), distinctly striate, it can be loose and often slips away from stem, rounded or slightly keeled towards the upper section, auricled at the mouth, smooth and glabrous. Leaf lamina are between 15–45 cm and 0.5–2.5 cm in length and width respectively, they are linear or narrowly elliptic, acuminate, broadest in the middle, pale green or rarely glaucous, slightly flaccid, expanded or folded at the midrib, asperulous (slightly rough), has a distinct midrib visible beneath. Ligules are mostly greater than 4 mm in length and up to 8 mm; they are soft, rounded, truncate or somewhat acute, whitish and often split along their longitudinal axis when dried; ligules are occasionally lacerate/ glabrous. Flowering occurs from November to April. Inflorescence panicles branch structure is spreading, 15–35 × 3–17 cm, solitary or occasionally adnate; narrow to widely elliptic or occasionally fan shaped. These panicles are erect or drooping slightly, rachides obtusely angular; glabrous or inconspicuously scaberulous, pedicels 2–5 mm in length. Spikelet length and width are between 4.9–6.5 mm and 1.9–2.6 mm respectively (length is usually 2.5x width). Spikelets are transversely attached to the pedicel, they are asymmetrically elliptic to oblong or broadly oblong viewed laterally, glaucous/ greyish-green. Intermediate forms have been observed where it can be difficult to distinguish between O. punctata and O. eichingeri. Glumes are much reduced to a thin whitish rim. Sterile lemmas are about equal in dimensions, 1–1.5 mm in length, glabrous, acute and triangular. Fertile lemmas are just shorter than the spikelet; they are semi-elliptic-oblong when viewed laterally, coriaceous; flanks are finely tesselate, shortly but stiffly hispid or rarely glabrous, keel and margins are ciliate, lateral apical protrusions almost always distinct. O. punctata awns are pale yellow, have rigid bristles which are straight or flexuous and commonly exceed 3 cm (2–7.5 cm) in length. Palea are shorter and thinner than the lemma, apex acute or tapering into a point. Anthers are 1.3–1.5 mm long and oblong shaped with a pale violet colour. Botanically, the fruits of rice plants are known as caryopses, which here are 4–4.75 mm × 1.5–1.75 mm in length and width respectively; they are oblong, glabrous and pale brown.

== Etymology ==
The common name for Oryza punctata Kotschy ex Steud. is Red rice. Oryza is a noun meaning rice in Late Latin (orȳza), it has origins in Ancient Greek (órūza) which lent from an Eastern Iranian language. Punctata means pointed or punctuated in Latin. The former most likely applies to this species. The synonym Oryza Schweinfurthiana Prodoehl. was published in Bot. Arch. (1922) but is not accepted.

== Habitat and ecology ==
Oryza punctata grows in rock-pools, permanent pools near rain forest and swampy soils near streams. O. punctata is a pest plant in commercial rice cultivation in Eswatini. The plant itself is of no use for grazing although there is some recorded use of the species for food in Kenya. O. punctata is one of two wild rice species that can be found in Madagascar. It only produces a small number of seeds and so if it is eaten at all, it is usually during a period of desperation such as a famine.

== Distribution ==
Oryza punctata is distributed across tropical Africa and Madagascar as well as Thailand and other parts of Indo-China. In terms of altitude, O. punctata can be found between 33 and 1230m above sea level. O. punctata has a large geographic distribution. It is native to Angola, Benin, Cameroon, Central African Republic, Chad, Congo, Côte d'Ivoire, Democratic Republic of the Congo, Eswatini, Ethiopia, Ghana, Kenya, Madagascar, Malawi, Mozambique, Nigeria, South Africa, Sudan, Tanzania, Togo, Uganda, Zambia and Zimbabwe.

== Taxonomy and systematics ==
Oryza punctata is one of over 300,000 flowering plant species. O. punctata is in the Poaceae family (Grasses) belonging to a large clade known as the Monocotyledon (Monocots), which consists of 93 families. Monocots are characterised by a single cotyledon, parallel leaf venation and scattered vascular bundles. Earliest evidence of Monocots is based on fossil pollen and dates back to the early Aptian some 117mya as read in. Earliest grass pollen and flower fossils date back to approximately 60-55mya but Poaceae only became dominant over many other plants groups about 24 mya; this is thought to be due to cooling and drying of the environment. The genus Oryza L. (Rice) diverged from the rest of Poaceae (Grasses) relatively recently, approximately 14 mya. Oryza L. originated in Asia and began to diversify, spreading to Australia, America and Africa in 3, 1 and 4 separate dispersal events respectively. Oryza L. has experienced two rapid radiation periods: the first event happened about 10 mya and the second - more recent - took place 5 mya. These two rapid radiation periods can account for the majority of diversity within the genus, the second of which lead to the emergence of Oryza punctata. Additional research is needed to investigate relationship between these radiation events and geographic dispersal events.

Rice (Oryza L.) has been widely studied in systematics and many other disciplines due to its agricultural importance, making up 19% of the calories consumed worldwide every day. A taxonomic description of Oryza punctata has been provided above. With global populations set to reach 10 billion by 2050, it is essential to improve key crops species such as rice. Systematics can help play a role in identifying wild crop relatives and investigating them for useful genetic adaptations. While O. punctata may itself be a pest species in paddy fields, wild rice species are seen as a valuable source of useful genes which can be carried over into agricultural species. Resistance to brown planthopper (BPH) and Zigzag leafhopper (ZLH) have been seen in O. punctata, which infests commercial rice plants.

== Status ==
Oryza punctata L. is listed as a species of least concern according to the International Union for Conservation of Nature (IUCN). This means the species has been assessed and is not a focus for species conservation. However, O. punctata has been cited as a rare species in some parts of native range such as Uganda, or stated that it had a rare frequency in southern Africa.
