= Oryza eichingeri =

Scientific classification
- Kingdom: Plantae
- Clade: Embryophytes
- Clade: Tracheophytes
- Clade: Angiosperms
- Clade: Monocots
- Clade: Commelinids
- Order: Poales
- Family: Poaceae
- Genus: Oryza
- Species: O. eichingeri

Binomial name
- Oryza eichingeri Peter

Synonyms
- Oryza collina (Trimen) S.D.Sharma & Shastry; Oryza glauca Robyns; Oryza rhizomatis D.A.Vaughan; Oryza ubanghensis A.Chev.

Species of plant

Oryza eichingeri (syns. Oryza collina and Oryza rhizomatis) is a species of wild rice in the family Poaceae, with a disjunct distribution in Ivory Coast, Republic of the Congo, Democratic Republic of the Congo, Uganda, Kenya, Tanzania, and Sri Lanka. It is being studied as a source of genes for resistance to the brown planthopper (Nilaparvata lugens), an important pest of cultivated rice (Oryza sativa).
