= Oryza officinalis =

Scientific classification
- Kingdom: Plantae
- Clade: Embryophytes
- Clade: Tracheophytes
- Clade: Spermatophytes
- Clade: Angiosperms
- Clade: Monocots
- Clade: Commelinids
- Order: Poales
- Family: Poaceae
- Genus: Oryza
- Species: O. officinalis

Binomial name
- Oryza officinalis Wall. ex Watt

Synonyms
- List: Oryza malampuzhaensis Krishnasw. & Chandras.; Oryza minuta var. silvatica (A.Camus) Veldkamp

Species of flowering plant

Oryza officinalis is species of flowering plant in the genus Oryza (rice) native to India, Nepal, the eastern Himalaya, southeast Asia, south-central and southeast China, Hainan, the Philippines, New Guinea, and the Northern Territory and Queensland in Australia. A perennial diploid with the CC rice genome, it can reach 3 m (10 ft) in height. It is the namesake of a widespread species complex.

== Pests ==
O. officinalis in Sukhothai Province, Thailand, was reported in 1990 to be highly resistant to tungro and various other pests, and already in use in several cultivars. (Note: p. 53, "Oryza officinalis from Sukothai, Thailand, is a good source of resistance to several pests and diseases; it has been used in a number of crosses to derive high-yielding lines with multiple pest resistance.") (Note: p. 520, "An accession of O. officinalis from Thailand showed high resistance to RTD (62), although it is not yet known whether this resistance is due to resistance to the vector, to the viruses themselves, or to some combination of these resistances. Results from recent research indicate that resistance to RTD is present in many wild rice species (R. Ikeda, personal communication), and perhaps some will show resistance to RTBV.")
