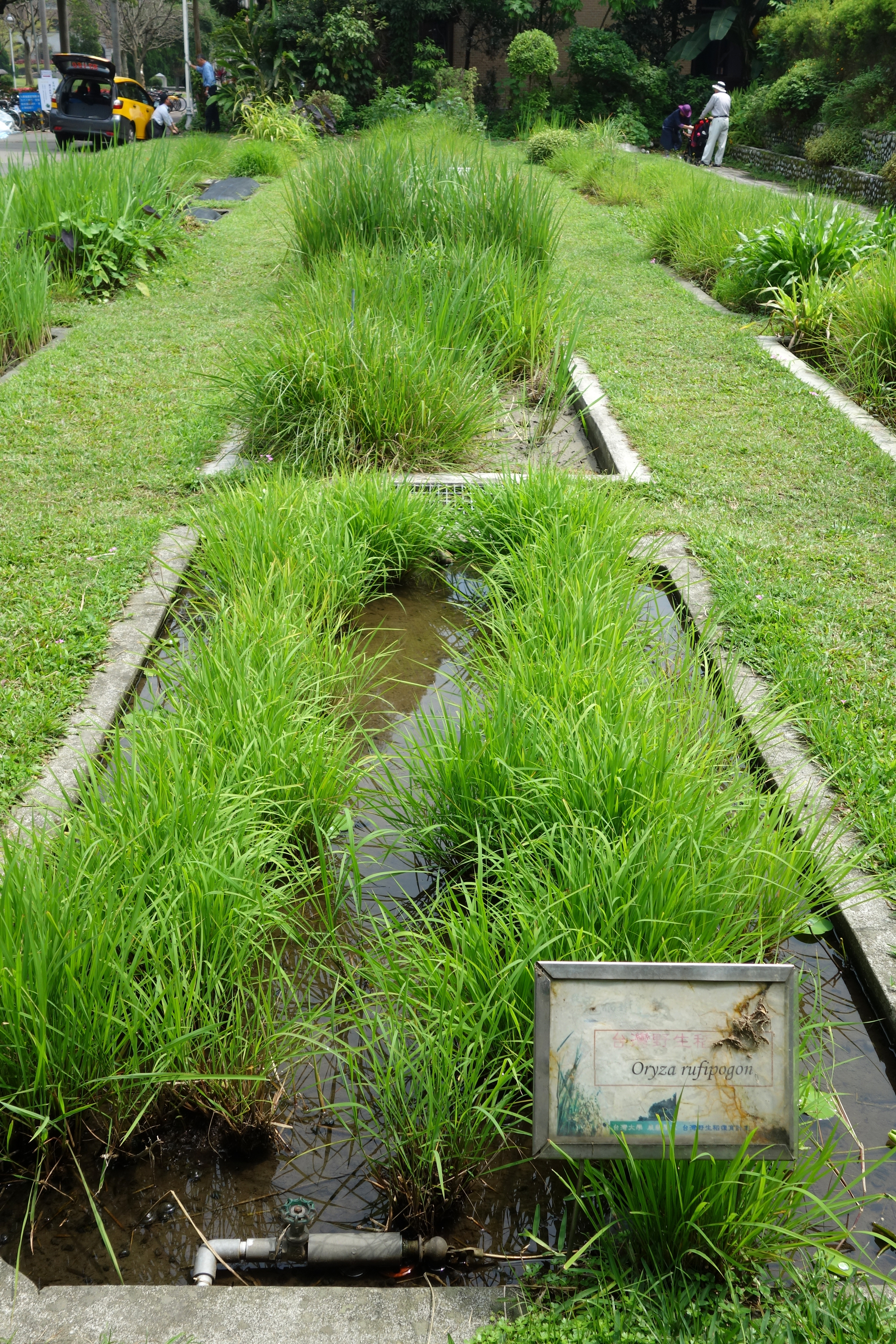

Conservation status
- Least Concern (IUCN 3.1)

Scientific classification
- Kingdom: Plantae
- Clade: Tracheophytes
- Clade: Angiosperms
- Clade: Monocots
- Clade: Commelinids
- Order: Poales
- Family: Poaceae
- Genus: Oryza
- Species: O. rufipogon

Binomial name
- Oryza rufipogon Griff.
- The range of Oryza rufipogon.

Synonyms
- Oryza sativa var. rufipogon (Griff.) Watt; Oryza sativa subsp. rufipogon (Griff.) De Wet; Oryza cubensis Ekman ex K.Gotoh & Okura; Oryza fatua J.Koenig ex Ridl.; Oryza fatua (Prain) Zhuk.; Oryza fatua f. aquatica (Roshev.) Roshev.; Oryza fatua var. longe-aristata Ridl.; Oryza glumipatula Steud.; Oryza jeyporensis Govindasw. & K.H.Krishnam.; Oryza meridionalis N.Q.Ng; Oryza nivara S.D.Sharma & Shastry; Oryza paraguayensis Franch.; Oryza perennis var. glumipatula (Steud.) C.Chev.; Oryza perennis var. paragayensis A.Chev.; Oryza sativa var. abuensis Watt; Oryza sativa var. aquatica Roshev.; Oryza sativa var. bengalensis Watt; Oryza sativa var. coarctata Watt; Oryza sativa subsp. fatua (Prain) De Wet; Oryza sativa var. fatua Prain; Oryza sativa var. paraguayensis Körn.; Oryza sativa var. paraguayensis Parodi; Oryza sativa var. paraguayensis Franch.; Oryza sativa var. sundensis Körn.

= Oryza rufipogon =

Species of grass

Oryza rufipogon is a species of flowering plant in the family Poaceae. It is known as brownbeard rice, wild rice, and red rice. In 1965, Oryza nivara was separated off from O. rufipogon. The separation has been questioned, and now many sources consider O. nivara to be a synonym of O. rufipogon. O. nivara may be treated as the annual form of O. rufipogon.

It is native to East-, Southeast- and South- Asia. It has a close evolutionary relation to Oryza sativa, the plant grown as a major rice food crop throughout the world. Oryza nivara is a possible wild progenitor of cultivated rice. Both have an AA genome.

== Description ==
For those who accept Oryza nivara as a separate species, it is an annual, short to intermediate height (usually <2 metres (6 ft 7 in)) grass; panicles usually compact, rarely open; spikelets large, 6–10.4 millimetres (0.24–0.41 in) long and 1.9–3.4 millimetres (0.075–0.134 in) wide, with strong awn (4–10 centimetres (1.6–3.9 in) long); anthers 1.5–3 millimetres (0.059–0.118 in) long. It grows in shallow water up to 0.3 metres (1 ft 0 in), in seasonally dry and open habitats. It is found growing in swampy areas, at edge of pond and tanks, beside streams, in ditches, in or around rice fields.

== Genetics ==
=== Selection ===
The effective population size (N_{e} ) has been inferred to be approximately 140,000 and estimates suggest approximately 20% of the amino acids within its genome evolve effectively neutrally. In other words, they evolve primarily through genetic drift rather than selection.

=== Precious germplasm ===
In India, the Pallikaranai marshland contains the wild rice O. rufipogon, described by the Sálim Ali Centre for Ornithology and Natural History (SACON) as a "precious germplasm."

=== Domestication ===
Dai et al., 2012 discover LHD1, an allele of DTH8/Ghd8. Dai also finds LHD1 produces the late heading O. rufipogon phenotype. This is one of the traits bred out during O. sativa domestication.

=== Genome ===
The genome of O. nivara was first sequenced in 2015.

Stein et al., 2018 sequenced the genomes of O. nivara and other domesticated and wild relatives. They produced reference assemblies and analyses for divergence time and genetic distance. (The O. nivara assembly is 338 Mb.) They demonstrated that this species and Oryza sativa subsp. indica are most closely related and that the same is true for Oryza sativa subsp. japonica and Oryza rufipogon.

== Invasive species ==
Oryza rufipogon is an invasive species and listed as a 'noxious weed' by the United States, and listed as a noxious weed in Alabama, California, Florida, Massachusetts, Minnesota, North Carolina, Oregon, South Carolina, and Vermont. According to the NAPPO (North American Plant Protection Organization), O. rufipogon blends in with cultivated O. sativa so well that it cannot be detected. In this position it competes with the cultivated rice and uses valuable fertilizer and space. O. rufipogon sheds most of its seeds before the harvest, therefore contributing little to the overall yield. In addition, the rice grains produced by the plant are not eaten by consumers, who see it as a strange foreign particle in otherwise white rice.

Oryza rufipogon is the scientific name for brownbeard rice. This wild rice was first domesticated into Oryza sativa, and its subsequent divergence into japonica and indica subspecies, occurred through a long process of domestication, artificial selection, and hybridization. Domestication led to artificial selection of rice with a mutation that made seeds non-shattering. This forced grains to stay attached and made harvesting easier. The plant was also bred for vertical architecture in its growth to maximize field density, and the awns were selectively bred away to reduce bulk density. Oryza sativa then led to the creation of two subspecies, japonica and indica. Oryza sativa subsp. japonica was primarily grown in temperate and subtropical regions, the plant was shorter than indica and had darker leaves. Japonica grains are short, round, and plump, and have lower amylose content than indica. Oryza sativa subsp. indica was primarily grown in tropical and humid regions. Indica has a taller growth and lighter leaf color. The grains are thinner, longer, and have higher amylose content. Diagram Legend 1.a - wild rice (Oryza rufipogon) 1.b - grains of wild rice (Oryza rufipogon) 2.a - Japanese rice (Oryza sativa subsp. japonica) 2.b - grains of Japanese rice (Oryza sativa subsp. japonica) 3.a - Indian rice (Oryza sativa subsp. indica) 3.b - grains of Indian rice (Oryza sativa subsp. indica)

== See also ==
- Rice topics
- Wild rice
