= Perennial =

Plant that lives for more than two years

Common chicory, Cichorium intybus, is a herbaceous perennial plant.

In botany, perennial (per- + -ennial, "through the year") is a plant that lives more than 2 years. Perennials contrast with shorter-lived annuals and biennials. The term is also loosely used to distinguish plants with little or no woody growth (secondary growth in girth) from trees and shrubs, which are also technically perennials. An estimated 94% of plant species are perennials.

Perennials (especially small flowering plants) that grow and bloom over the spring and summer, die back every autumn and winter, and then return in the spring from their rootstock or other overwintering structure, are known as herbaceous perennials. However, depending on the rigours of the local climate (temperature, moisture, organic content in the soil, microorganisms), a plant that is a perennial in its native habitat, may be treated by a gardener as an annual and planted out every year, from seed, from cuttings, or from divisions. Tomato vines, for example, live several years in their natural tropical/ subtropical habitat but are grown as annuals in temperate regions because their above-ground biomass does not survive the winter.

There is also a class of evergreen perennials which lack woody stems, such as Bergenia which retain a mantle of leaves throughout the year. An intermediate class of plants is known as subshrubs, which retain a vestigial woody structure in winter, e.g. Penstemon.

The symbol for a perennial plant, based on Species Plantarum by Linnaeus, is.

== Life cycle and structure ==
Perennial plants can be short-lived (only a few years) or long-lived. They include a wide assortment of plant groups from non-flowering plants like ferns and liverworts to highly diverse flowering plants like orchids, grasses, and woody plants. Plants that flower and fruit only once and then die are termed monocarpic or semelparous; these species may live for many years before they flower. For example, a century plant can live for 80 years and grow 30 meters tall before flowering and dying. However, most perennials are polycarpic (or iteroparous), flowering over many seasons in their lifetime. Perennials invest more resources than annuals into roots, crowns, and other structures that allow them to live from one year to the next. They often have a competitive advantage because they can commence their growth and leaf out earlier in the growing season, and can grow taller than annuals. In doing so, they can better compete for space and collect more light.

Perennials typically grow structures that allow them to adapt to living from one year to the next through a form of vegetative reproduction rather than seeding. These structures include bulbs, tubers, woody crowns, rhizomes, turions, woody stems, or crowns which allows them to survive periods of dormancy over cold or dry seasons; these structures typically store carbohydrates which are used once the dormancy period is over and new growth begins. In climates that are warm all year long, perennials may grow continuously. Annuals which complete their life cycle in one growing season, in contrast with perennials, produce seeds as the next generation and die; the seeds may survive cold or dry periods or germinate soon after dispersal depending on the climate.

Some perennials retain their foliage year-round; these are evergreen perennials. Deciduous perennials shed all their leaves part of the year. Deciduous perennials include herbaceous and woody plants; herbaceous plants have stems that lack hard, fibrous growth, while woody plants have stems with buds that survive above ground during dormancy. Some perennials are semi-deciduous, meaning they lose some of their leaves in either winter or summer. Deciduous perennials shed their leaves when growing conditions are no longer suitable for photosynthesis, such as when it is too cold or dry. In many parts of the world, seasonality is expressed as wet and dry periods rather than warm and cold periods, and deciduous perennials lose their leaves in the dry season.

Some perennial plants are protected from wildfires because they have underground roots that produce adventitious shoots, bulbs, crowns, or stems; other perennials like trees and shrubs may have thick cork layers that protect the stems. Herbaceous perennials from temperate and alpine regions of the world can tolerate the cold during winter.

Perennial plants may remain dormant for long periods and then recommence growth and reproduction when the environment is more suitable, while most annual plants complete their life cycle during one growing period, and biennials have two growing periods.

The meristem of perennial plants communicates with the hormones produced due to environmental situations (i.e., seasons), reproduction, and stage of development to begin and halt the ability to grow or flower. There is also a distinction between the ability to grow and the actual task of growth. For example, most trees regain the ability to grow during winter but do not initiate physical growth until the spring and summer months. The start of dormancy can be seen in perennial plants through withering flowers, loss of leaves on trees, and halting of reproduction in both flowering and budding plants.

Perennial species may produce relatively large seeds that have the advantage of generating larger seedlings that can better compete with other plants. Perennials also produce seeds over many years.

An important aspect of cold acclimation is overexpression of DNA repair genes. In Thinopyrum intermedium a perennial relative of common wheat Triticum aestivum, conditions of freezing stress were shown to be associated with large increases in expression of two DNA repair genes (one gene product a photolyase and the other, a protein involved in nucleotide excision repair).

== Cultivation ==
Perennials that are cultivated include: woody plants like fruit trees grown for their edible fruits; shrubs and trees grown as landscaping ornamentals; herbaceous food crops like asparagus, rhubarb, strawberries; and subtropical plants not hardy in colder areas such as tomatoes, eggplant, and coleus (which are treated as annuals in colder areas). Perennials also include plants grown for their flowering and other ornamental value including bulbs (like tulips, narcissus, and gladiolus); lawn grass, and other groundcovers, (such as periwinkle (Note: Some groundcovers, such as the periwinkle, (Vinca major), amongst others, are environmental weeds in some areas. They may be invasive in regions where are they are not native because their ability for rapid spread chokes out native plant species and alters habitats. For Vinca, areas affected include parts of Australia, New Zealand, Canada, and the United States, especially coastal California.) and Dichondra).

Each type of plant must be separated differently; for example, plants with fibrous root systems like daylilies, Siberian iris, or grasses can be pried apart with two garden forks inserted back to back, or cut by knives. However, plants such as bearded irises have a root system of rhizomes; these root systems should be planted with the top of the rhizome just above ground level, with leaves from the following year showing. The point of dividing perennials is to increase the amount of a single breed of plant in your garden. In the United States more than 900 million dollars' worth of potted herbaceous perennial plants were sold in 2019.

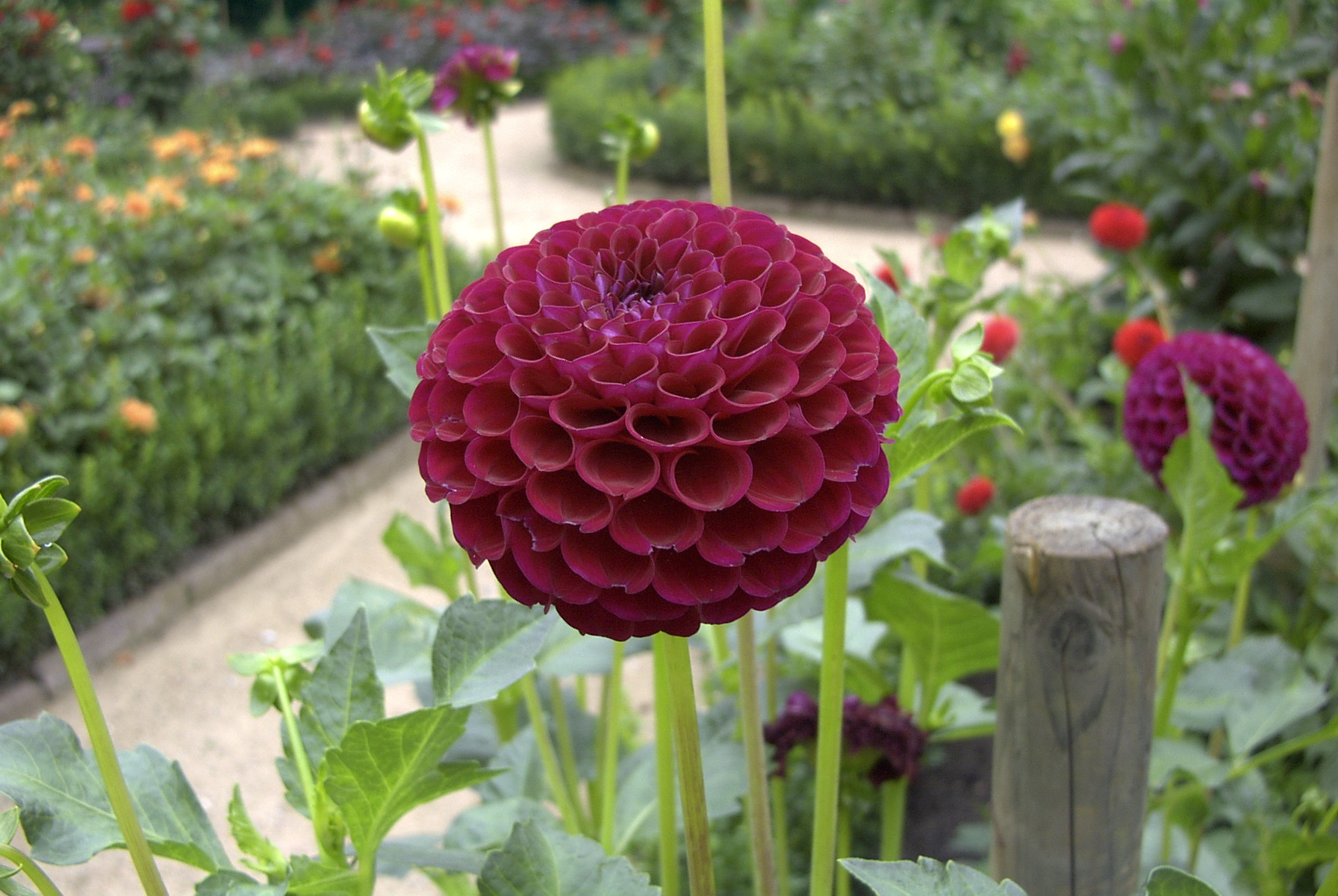
Dahlia plants are tender perennials that originate from climates that are warm all year round and need special care to survive cold winters.

== Benefits in agriculture ==
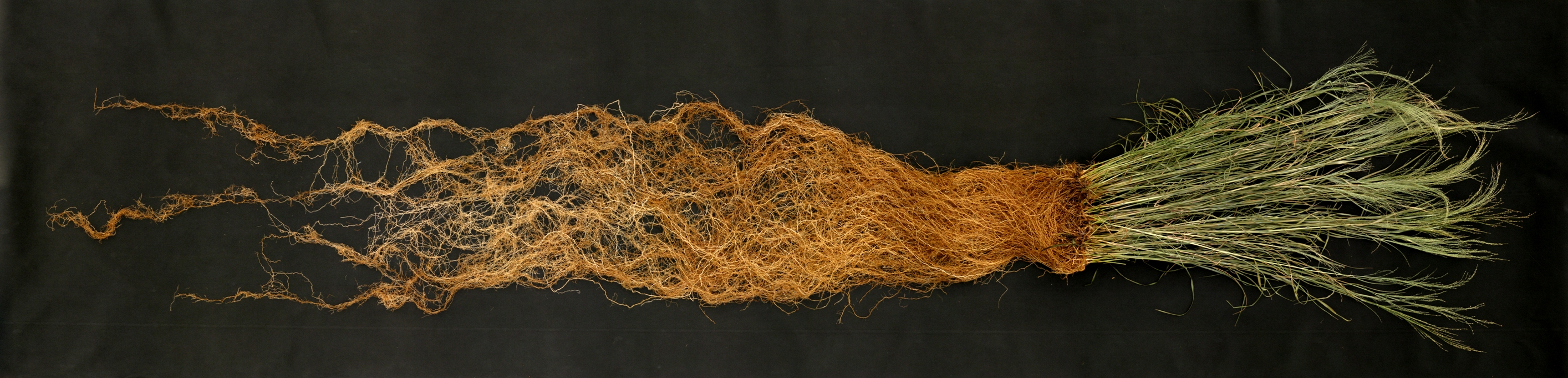
Switchgrass is a deep-rooted perennial. These roots are more than 3 meters long.

Although most of humanity is fed by the re-sowing of the seeds of annual grain crops, (either naturally or by the manual efforts of humans), perennial crops provide numerous benefits. Perennial plants often have deep, extensive root systems which can hold soil to prevent erosion, capture dissolved nitrogen before it can contaminate ground and surface water, and out-compete weeds (reducing the need for herbicides). These potential benefits of perennials have resulted in new attempts to increase the seed yield of perennial species, which could result in the creation of new perennial grain crops. Some examples of new perennial crops being developed are perennial rice and intermediate wheatgrass. A perennial rice developed in 2018, was reported in 2023, to have provided a similar yield to replanted annual rice when evaluated over eight consecutive harvests.

== Location ==
Perennial plants dominate many natural ecosystems on land and in fresh water, with only a very few (e.g. Zostera) occurring in shallow sea water. Herbaceous perennial plants are particularly dominant in conditions too fire-prone for trees and shrubs, e.g., most plants on prairies and steppes are perennials; they are also dominant on tundra too cold for tree growth. Nearly all forest plants are perennials, including trees and shrubs.

Perennial plants are usually better long-term competitors, especially under stable, resource-poor conditions. This is due to the development of larger root systems which can access water and soil nutrients deeper in the soil and to earlier emergence in the spring. Annual plants have an advantage in disturbed environments because of their faster growth and reproduction rates.

== Types ==
- Herbaceous – plants that have foliage and stems that die to the ground at the end of the growing season and which show only primary growth. Examples include frost-tender plants such as Rudbeckia, Mirabilis jalapa, Momordica charantia, mint, tobacco, common purslane, alfalfa, petunias, Thinopyrum intermedium, red clover, Hylotelephium telephium and Cochliasanthus caracalla.
- Evergreen – plants that have persistent foliage without woody stems. Examples include many Senecio, Begonia, Gaillardia, Dimorphotheca, Gazania, Thunbergia, Dietes, Osteospermum, Tradescantia, and Vinca, among others.
- Woody – plants with persistent above ground stem that survive from one growing season to the next, with primary and secondary growth, or growth in width protected by an outer cortex. Some may be deciduous. Examples of many shrubs, lianas and trees such as Ipomea, banana, lilacs, Geranium, Lantana, Hydrangea, Nandina, Pandorea, grape, Hedera, pine, apple, jasmines, Trachelospermum, Gardenia, Plumbago, Cistus, and roses, among others.
- Monocarpic – plants that flower, set seeds once and then die. Examples include, Agave and some species of Streptocarpus

== List of perennials ==
Each section contains a short list of species related to that topic, these are an example as the true lists would fill several books.

=== Perennial flowers ===
Perennials grown for their decorative flowers include very many species and types. Some examples include:

- Achillea
- Aster
- Bergenia
- Dahlia
- Foxglove
- Hollyhock
- Kniphofia
- Lupin
- Salvia
- Peony
- Phlox

=== Perennial fruits ===
The majority of fruit bearing plants are perennial even in temperate climates. Examples include:

- Apple
- Blackcurrant
- Blueberry
- Blackberry
- Currant
- Grape
- Pear
- Plum
- Raspberries
- Strawberry

=== Perennial herbs ===
Many herbs are perennial, including these examples:

- Fennel
- Mint
- Rosemary
- Sage
- Thyme

=== Perennial vegetables ===
Many vegetable plants can grow as perennials in tropical climates, but die in cold weather. Examples of some of the more completely perennial vegetables are:

- Asparagus
- Chives
- Globe artichoke
- Jerusalem artichoke
- Kale
- Leek
- New Zealand spinach
- Rhubarb
- Sea kale
- Sweet potato

=== Aquatic plants ===
Many aquatic plants are perennial even though many do not have woody tissue. Examples include:

- Crassula helmsii – New Zealand stonecrop
- Pontederia cordata – Pickerell weed
- Stratiotes aloides – Water soldier which sinks to the bottom of the pond in winter
- Utricularia vulgaris – Common bladderwort which produces turions as its overwintering stage

== See also ==
- Annual plant – Plant which completes its life cycle within one growing season and then dies
- Biennial plant – Flowering plant that takes two years to complete its biological life cycle
- Herbaceous plant – Plant that has no persistent woody stem above ground
- Herbchronology
- Perennial grain – Grain crops that remain productive for two or more years without replanting
