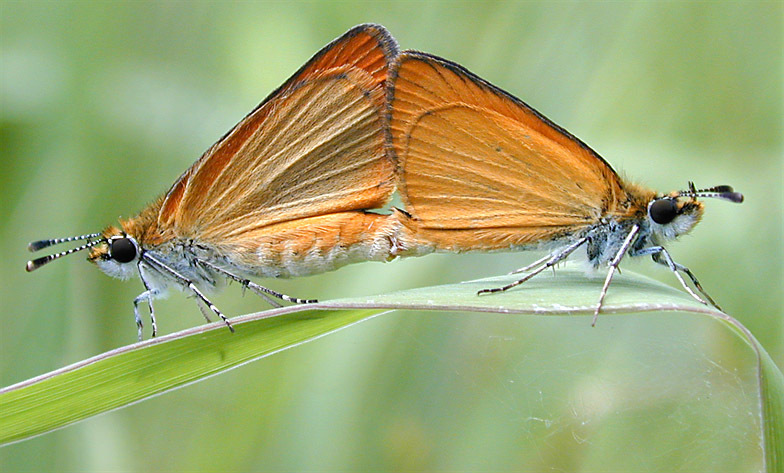
- Pair of least skippers mating

Conservation status
- Secure (NatureServe)

Scientific classification
- Domain: Eukaryota
- Kingdom: Animalia
- Phylum: Arthropoda
- Class: Insecta
- Order: Lepidoptera
- Family: Hesperiidae
- Genus: Ancyloxypha
- Species: A. numitor

Binomial name
- Ancyloxypha numitor (Fabricius, 1793)
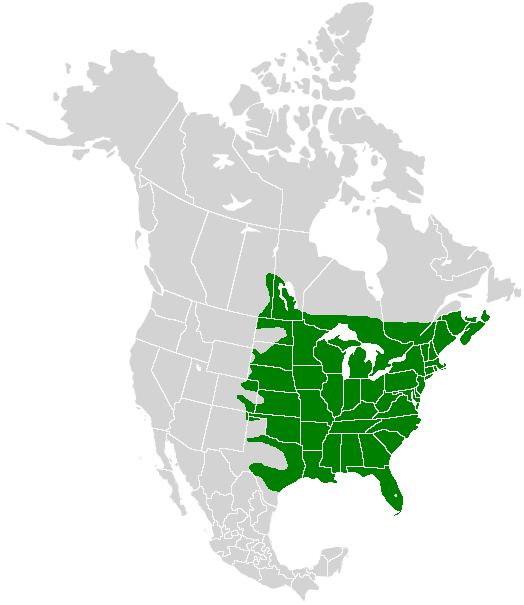

= Ancyloxypha numitor =

Species of butterfly

Ancyloxypha numitor, the least skipper, is a North American butterfly in the family Hesperiidae. They have a weak, Satyrinae-like flight.

== Description ==
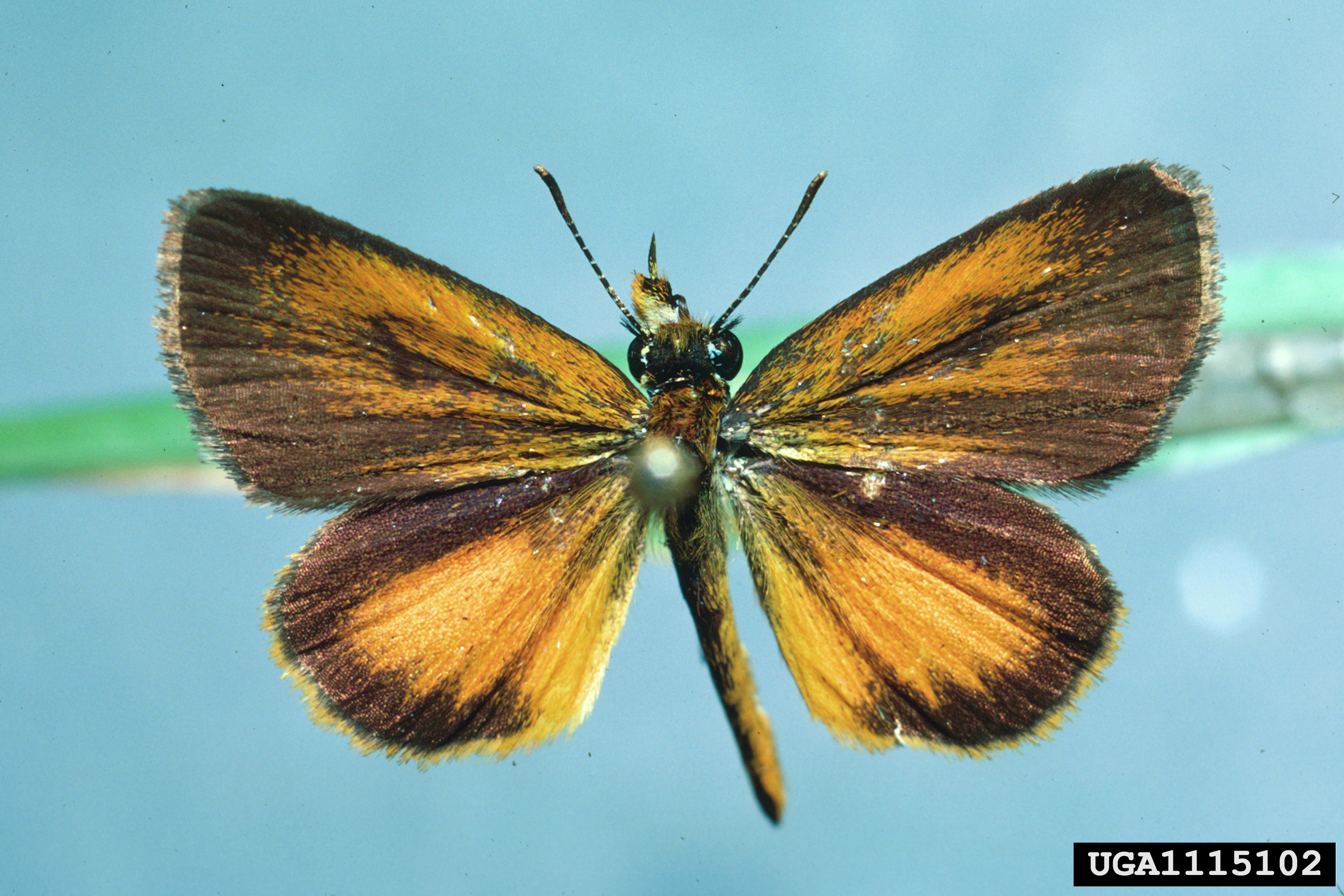
Upper side

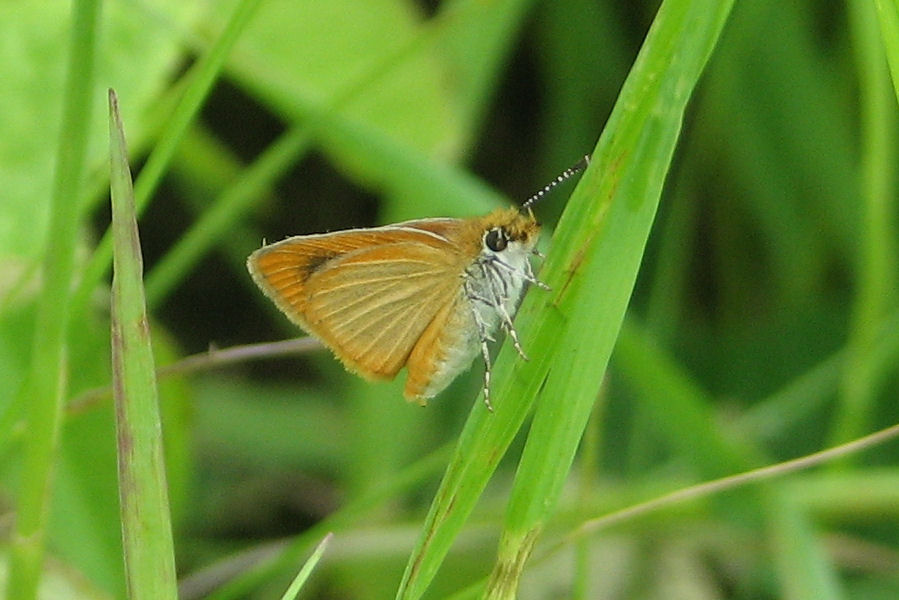
Ventral view

The least skipper's rounded wings and slender body are distinctive. Their checkered antennae have no hooks. Males lack stigmata. The upper sides of the forewings are dark brownish black sometimes having a patch of orange. The hindwing is orange with a broad dark brownish-black band surrounding the orange area completely. The underside of the wings is orange with the hindwing discal area being a little bit darker. The hindwing veins are whitish. Its wingspan ranges from 17 to 26 mm.

== Similar species ==
There are four similar species in the least skipper's range. They are the European skipper (Thymelicus lineola), the tropical least skipper (Ancyloxypha arene), the orange skipperling (Copaeodes aurantiaca), and the southern skipperling (Copaeodes minima).

The European skipper has more pointed wings than the least skipper, the antennae are short and not checkered, and the upper side of the wings is mostly orange or reddish orange with thin black wing margins. Males also have very thin, black stigmata near the costal forewing edge.

The tropical least skipper has more orange on the upper side of the wings than the least skipper, and the underside of the wings has very small black marginal spots.

The orange skipperling is almost all bright orange on the upper side except for the basal areas being black. Males have black stigmata, and females usually have some black below the forewing cell.

The southern skipperling is smaller than the least skipper (it is also the smallest skipper in the United States) and the underside of the hindwing has a white ray which runs the width of the hindwing from the basal area to the margin.

== Habitat ==
The least skipper favors damp or wet habitats with tall grasses.

== Flight ==
Adults may be noticed on the wing from May to September in the north and February to December in the south. It may be seen all year in southern Florida.

== Life cycle ==
To find females, males will patrol through stands of grass. Females lay their eggs singly on the host plant. The pale yellow eggs will soon form an orange-red ring round the middle. The larvae make a nest by rolling up a single blade of grass or by using silk to tie together multiple leaves. The variable larva is grass green with four white pairs of distinct wax glands along the subventral area of the abdomen. The head is either brown or tan and is usually darker in the center. The collar has a white stripe and a black stripe. The cream pupa has brownish colored markings. It overwinters as a larva in the third or fourth instar. It has two to four broods per year.

== Host plants ==
Host plants of the least skipper include:

- Cogongrass, Imperata sp.
- Rice cutgrass, Leersia oryzoides
- Cultivated rice, Oryza sativa
- Panicum sp.
- Bluegrass, Poa sp.
- Setaria sp.
- Cordgrass, Spartina sp.
- Marsh millet, Zizaniopsis miliacea
