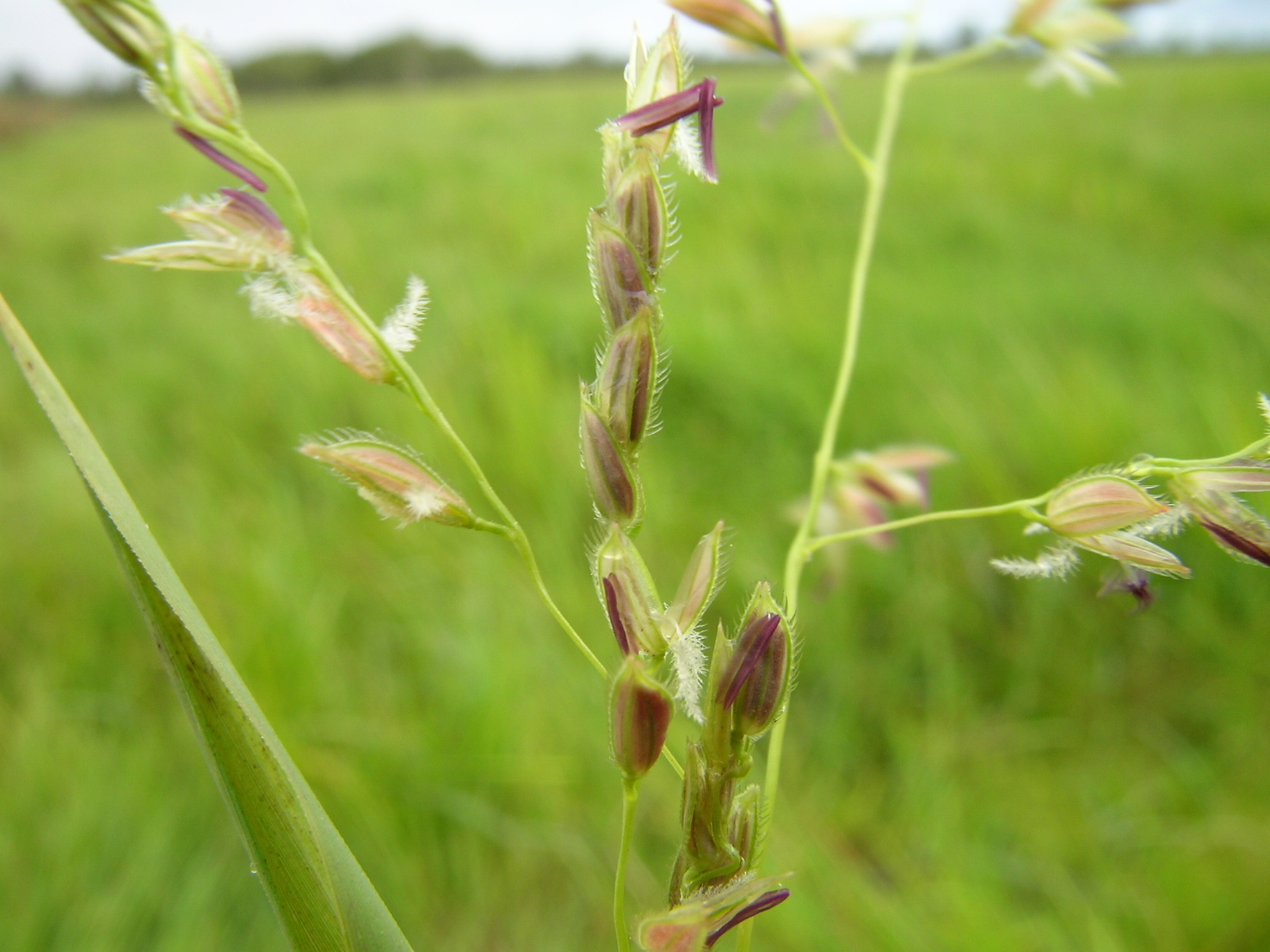
- Leersia hexandra

Scientific classification
- Kingdom: Plantae
- Clade: Embryophytes
- Clade: Tracheophytes
- Clade: Angiosperms
- Clade: Monocots
- Clade: Commelinids
- Order: Poales
- Family: Poaceae
- Subfamily: Oryzoideae
- Tribe: Oryzeae
- Subtribe: Oryzinae
- Genus: Leersia; Sw. 1788 not Hedw. ex Batsch 1802 (moss in family Encalyptaceae)

Type species
- Leersia oryzoides (L.) Sw.

Synonyms
- Homalocenchrus Mieg; Ehrhartia Weber; Asprella Schreb.; Aplexia Raf.; Endodia Raf.; Blepharochloa Endl.; Pseudoryza Griff.

= Leersia =

cutgrasses

Genus of plants

Leersia is a genus of plants in the grass family which includes species known generally as cutgrasses.

The genus is widespread across many countries on all the inhabited continents.

It was named for the German botanist Johann Daniel Leers (1727–1774).

Species

- Leersia angustifolia Prodoehl - Sudan
- Leersia denudata Launert - from Kenya to Cape Province
- Leersia drepanothrix Stapf - from Guinea to Uganda
- Leersia friesii Melderis - from Uganda to Botswana
- Leersia hexandra Sw. - Africa, Eurasia, Australian, North + South America, various islands
- Leersia japonica (Honda) Honda - China, Japan, Korea
- Leersia lenticularis Michx. - central + eastern USA
- Leersia ligularis Trin. - Latin America + West Indies from Coahuila to Paraguay
- Leersia monandra Sw. - Texas, Florida, Mexico, West Indies
- Leersia nematostachya Launert - Cameroon, Angola, Zambia
- Leersia oncothrix C.E.Hubb. - Zambia
- Leersia oryzoides (L.) Sw. - Eurasia (from Azores to Primorye), North America (Canada, USA, northeastern Mexico)
- Leersia perrieri (A.Camus) Launert - Madagascar
- Leersia sayanuka Ohwi - China, Japan, Korea, Vietnam
- Leersia stipitata Bor - Thailand
- Leersia tisserantii (A.Chev.) Launert - from Guinea to Namibia
- Leersia triandra C.E.Hubb. - Sierra Leone, Liberia, Cameroon
- Leersia virginica Willd. - eastern Canada, eastern + central USA

formerly included

see Arthraxon Digitaria Hygroryza Maltebrunia Megastachya

- Leersia aristata - Hygroryza aristata
- Leersia digitaria - Digitaria ciliaris
- Leersia disticha - Megastachya mucronata
- Leersia hispida - Arthraxon hispidus
- Leersia latifolia - Maltebrunia leersioides
