= Watergrass =

Watergrass is a common name for several plants and may refer to:

- Echinochloa crus-galli, native to tropical Asia
- Hygroryza
- Luziola
