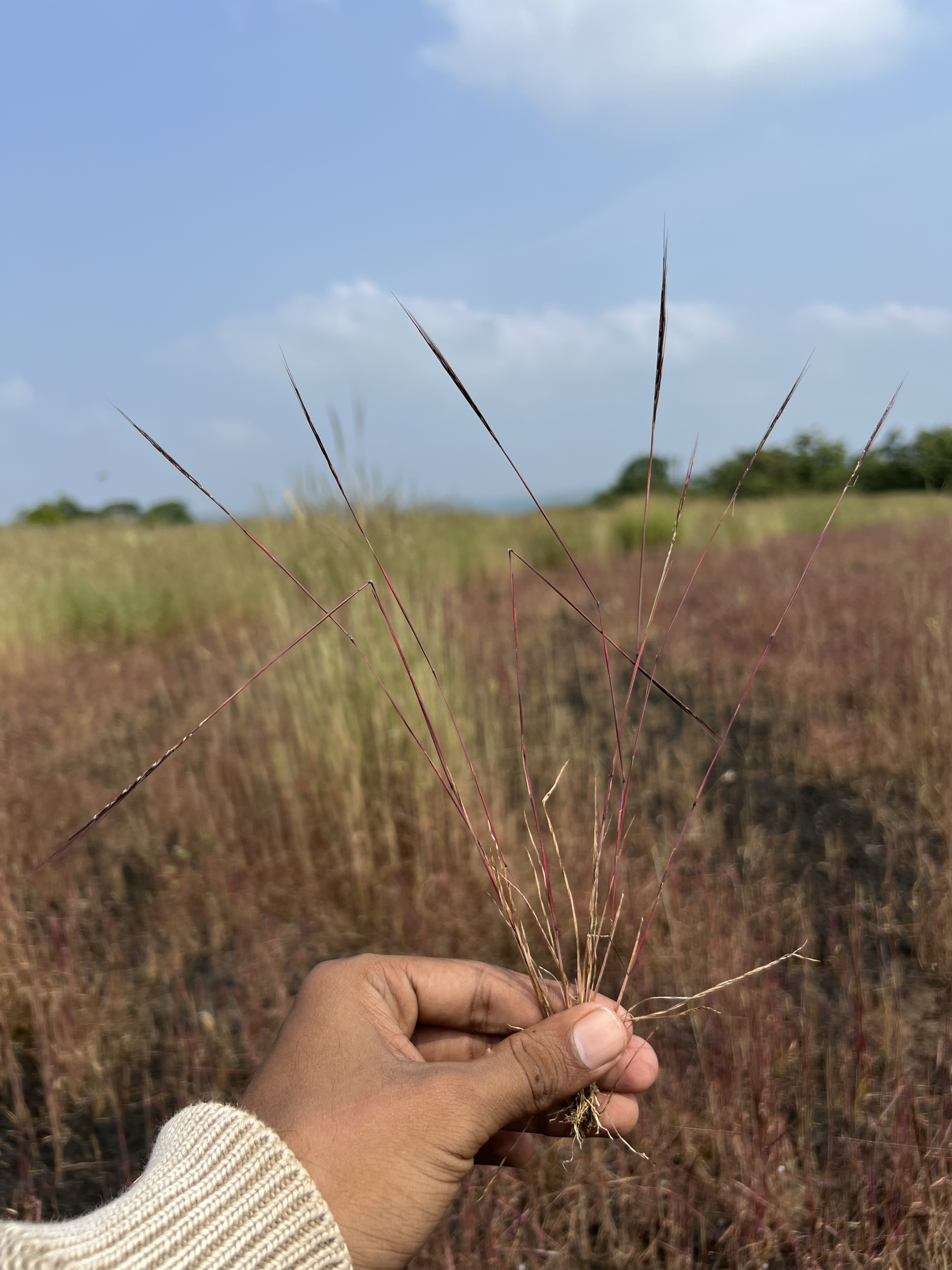

Scientific classification
- Kingdom: Plantae
- Clade: Embryophytes
- Clade: Tracheophytes
- Clade: Spermatophytes
- Clade: Angiosperms
- Clade: Monocots
- Clade: Commelinids
- Order: Poales
- Family: Poaceae
- Subfamily: Panicoideae
- Supertribe: Andropogonodae
- Tribe: Andropogoneae
- Subtribe: Ischaeminae
- Genus: Dimeria; R.Br.

Type species
- Dimeria acinaciformis R.Br.

Synonyms
- Didactylon Zoll. & Moritzi; Haplachne J.Presl; Psilostachys Steud. 1854, illegitimate homonym not Turcz. 1843 (Euphorbiaceae) nor Hochst. 1844 (Amaranthaceae); Pterygostachyum Nees ex Steud.; Woodrowia Stapf

= Dimeria =

Genus of grasses

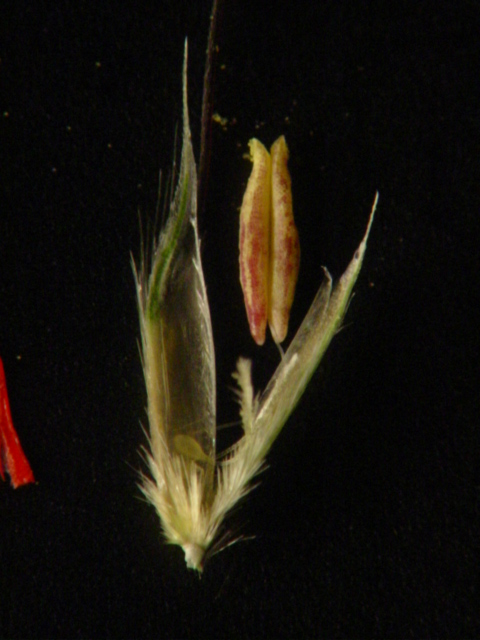
Spikelet of Dimeria raizadae, an endemic species of Kerala, India

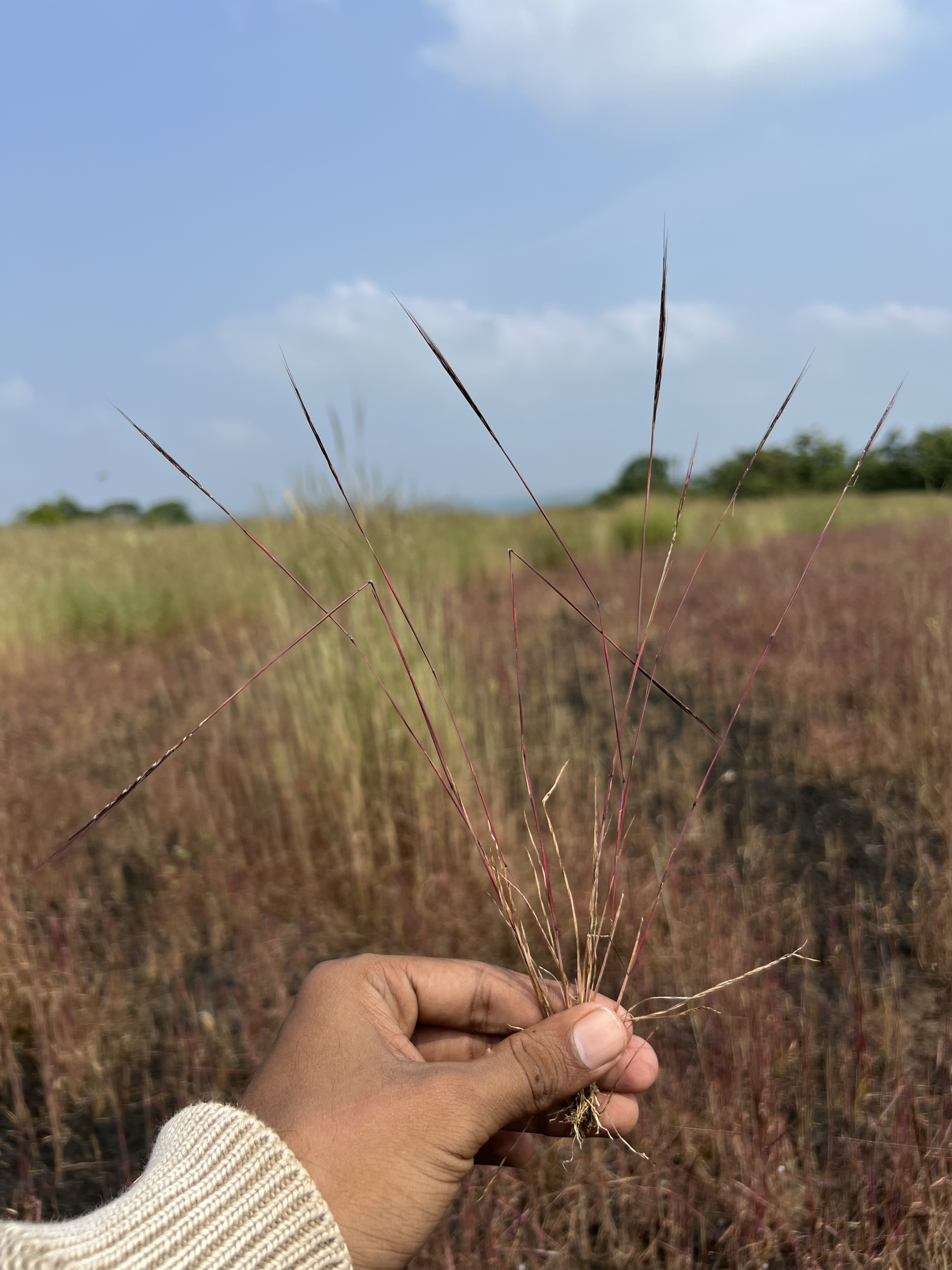
Dimeria santapaui M.R. Almeida

Dimeria is a genus of Asian, Australian, Madagascan, and Pacific Island plants in the grass family, mostly distributed in Peninsular India

The genus is characterised by its tough raceme rachis bearing strongly compressed single spikelets. It is believed that peninsular India, which has 42 taxa (including 7 infra-specific taxa) and 23 endemic species, is the centre of its distribution.

Species

- Dimeria acinaciformis - Queensland, Northern Territory
- Dimeria acutipes - Tamil Nadu
- Dimeria agasthyamalayana - Kerala
- Dimeria anadamanica - Andaman Island
- Dimeria aristata - Sri Lanka
- Dimeria avenacea - Tamil Nadu, Sri Lanka, Myanmar
- Dimeria balakrishnaniana - Tamil Nadu
- Dimeria ballardii - Sri Lanka
- Dimeria bialata - Tamil Nadu
- Dimeria chloridiformis - Thailand, Malaysia, Philippines, New Guinea, Australia, Santa Cruz Islands, Micronesia
- Dimeria connivens - Bihar, Odisha
- Dimeria copeana - Kerala
- Dimeria deccanensis - Tamil Nadu
- Dimeria dipteros - New Guinea
- Dimeria falcata - China, Indochina
- Dimeria fischeri - Tamil Nadu
- Dimeria fuscescens - Indian Subcontinent, Myanmar, Thailand
- Dimeria glabriuscula - New Guinea
- Dimeria gracilis - India, Sri Lanka, Vietnam
- Dimeria guangxiensis - Guangxi
- Dimeria hohenackeri - India, Myanmar
- Dimeria jainii - India
- Dimeria josephi - Kerala
- Dimeria kalavoorensis - Kerala
- Dimeria kaleri - Kerala
- Dimeria kanjirapallilana - Kerala
- Dimeria keenanii - Myanmar
- Dimeria kerrii - Thailand
- Dimeria kurzii - Indochina
- Dimeria kurumthotticalana - Kerala
- Dimeria lawsonii - India
- Dimeria lehmannii - India, Sri Lanka
- Dimeria leptorhachis - Sri Lanka, Myanmar, Thailand, Pen. Malaysia
- Dimeria madagascariensis - Madagascar
- Dimeria mahendragiriensis - Odisha
- Dimeria manongarivensis - Madagascar
- Dimeria monostachya - New Guinea
- Dimeria mooneyi - Odisha
- Dimeria namboodiriana - Kerala
- Dimeria neglecta - Primorye
- Dimeria orissae - Odisha
- Dimeria ornithopoda - Asia (from Oman to Japan + Philippines), New Guinea, Australia, Micronesia
- Dimeria paniculata - Palau
- Dimeria perrieri - Madagascar
- Dimeria pubescens - India, Sri Lanka, Thailand
- Dimeria raizadae - Kerala
- Dimeria raviana - Kerala
- Dimeria sinensis - Thailand, southern China
- Dimeria solitaria - Guangdong
- Dimeria stapfiana - Maharashtra
- Dimeria thwaitesii - Sri Lanka, Indochina
- Dimeria veldkampii - Goa
- Dimeria woodrowii - Maharashtra

formerly included

see Arthraxon, Nanooravia

- Dimeria scrobiculata - Arthraxon hispidus
- Dimeria santapaui - Nanooravia santapaui
- Dimeria keralae - Nanooravia santapaui

== See also ==
- Tribe Andropogoneae
- List of Poaceae genera
