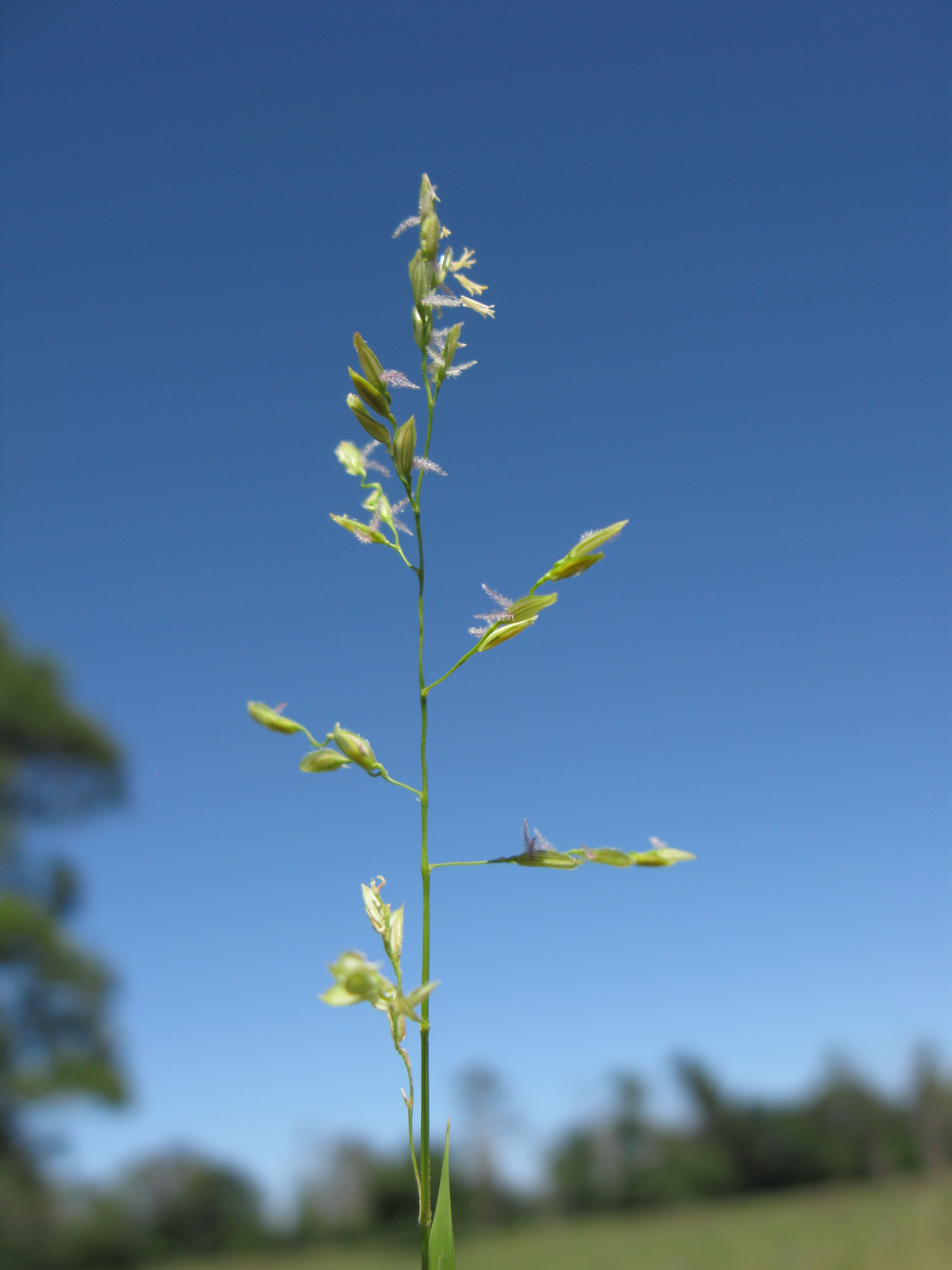

Conservation status
- Secure (NatureServe)

Scientific classification
- Kingdom: Plantae
- Clade: Tracheophytes
- Clade: Angiosperms
- Clade: Monocots
- Clade: Commelinids
- Order: Poales
- Family: Poaceae
- Genus: Leersia
- Species: L. hexandra

Binomial name
- Leersia hexandra Sw.

Synonyms
- Synonyms: Asprella australis; Asprella brasiliensis; Asprella hexandra; Asprella mexicana; Blepharochloa ciliata; Homalocenchrus angustifolius; Homalocenchrus gouinii; Homalocenchrus hexandrus; Hygroryza ciliata; Leersia abyssinica; Leersia aegyptiaca; Leersia angustifolia; Leersia australis; Leersia brasiliensis; Leersia capensis; Leersia ciliaris; Leersia ciliata; Leersia compressa; Leersia contracta; Leersia dubia; Leersia elongata; Leersia ferox; Leersia glaberrima; Leersia gouinii; Leersia gracilis; Leersia griffithiana; Leersia luzonensis; Leersia mauritanica; Leersia mauritiaca; Leersia mexicana; Leersia parviflora; Oryza australis; Oryza hexandra; Oryza mexicana; Pharus ciliatus; Pseudoryza ciliata; Zizania ciliata

= Leersia hexandra =

Species of plant

Leersia hexandra is a species of grass known by the common names southern cutgrass, clubhead cutgrass, and swamp rice grass. It has a pantropical distribution. It is also an introduced species in many regions, sometimes becoming invasive, and it is an agricultural weed of various crops, especially rice. It is also cultivated as a forage for livestock.

== Description ==
This species is a perennial grass growing from rhizomes and stolons. The hollow stems are decumbent and creeping and root easily where their nodes contact the substrate. They produce erect shoots that can exceed one meter tall. It is an aquatic or semi-aquatic grass, and the erect stem parts may float in water. These stems can grow densely in aquatic habitat and become matted, forming what are often referred to as "carpets".

The leaf sheath has a fleshy base covered in white hairs and the ligule can be stiff and dry, becoming "papery". The leaves have sharp-pointed blades up to 30 centimeters long which are flat or rolled, the edges sometimes rolling at night or when the blade dries. The blades are sometimes hairless, but are usually coated in very rough hairs, making them so rough to the touch that they are "unpleasant to handle". They also have very sharp edges, and the midrib has backward-facing, spiny hairs that give it a cutting edge. The "retrorsely spinulose midrib of the leaf can inflict most painful lacerations".

The panicle is narrow or spreading and erect or nodding, and up to about 12 centimeters long. The branches are almost fully lined with overlapping spikelets each up to half a centimeter long. The spikelets may be greenish or purplish in color, or sometimes tinged with orange or brick red. They are surrounded by white or purplish bracts that have characteristic comb-like hairs along their greenish nerves. The flower has six stamens. After the spikelets fall, the panicle branches have a zig-zag shape. Fertile seed is rarely produced and the grass commonly reproduces vegetatively by sprouting from the rhizome or the nodes on the stem. Large stands of the grass are often clones.

This grass looks very similar to rice and other species of the genus Oryza. It is a member of the rice tribe Oryzeae and sometimes grows in rice paddies.

== Ecology ==
This plant grows in shallow freshwater habitat and on wet and moist land. It can be found in marshes, swamps, ponds, irrigation ditches, flooded rice fields, and on other moist agricultural land and floodplains. It is mostly tropical, but it can grow in some temperate climates. It can persist for a time in drier conditions during drought.

The grass provides food and shelter for animals. Many water birds feed on it. In Tanzania it is a dominant plant in the swamps where the shoebill (Balaeniceps rex) and wattled crane (Bugeranus carunculatus) build their nests. On the Llanos of Colombia and Venezuela it is the second most important food of the resident herds of capybara (Hydrochoerus hydrochaeris), composing up to 29% of their diet.

It is one of the two host plants of the brown planthopper (Nilaparvata lugens), the other being cultivated rice. While it has been observed on many other plant species, it can only complete its life cycle on cutgrass or rice. There are two strains of the planthopper, one that only lays eggs on rice and one that favors cutgrass; the rice strain does not effectively reproduce on cutgrass and vice versa, even when sympatric. While they can be crossed in laboratory tests, the two strains do not interbreed in the wild.

== As a weed ==
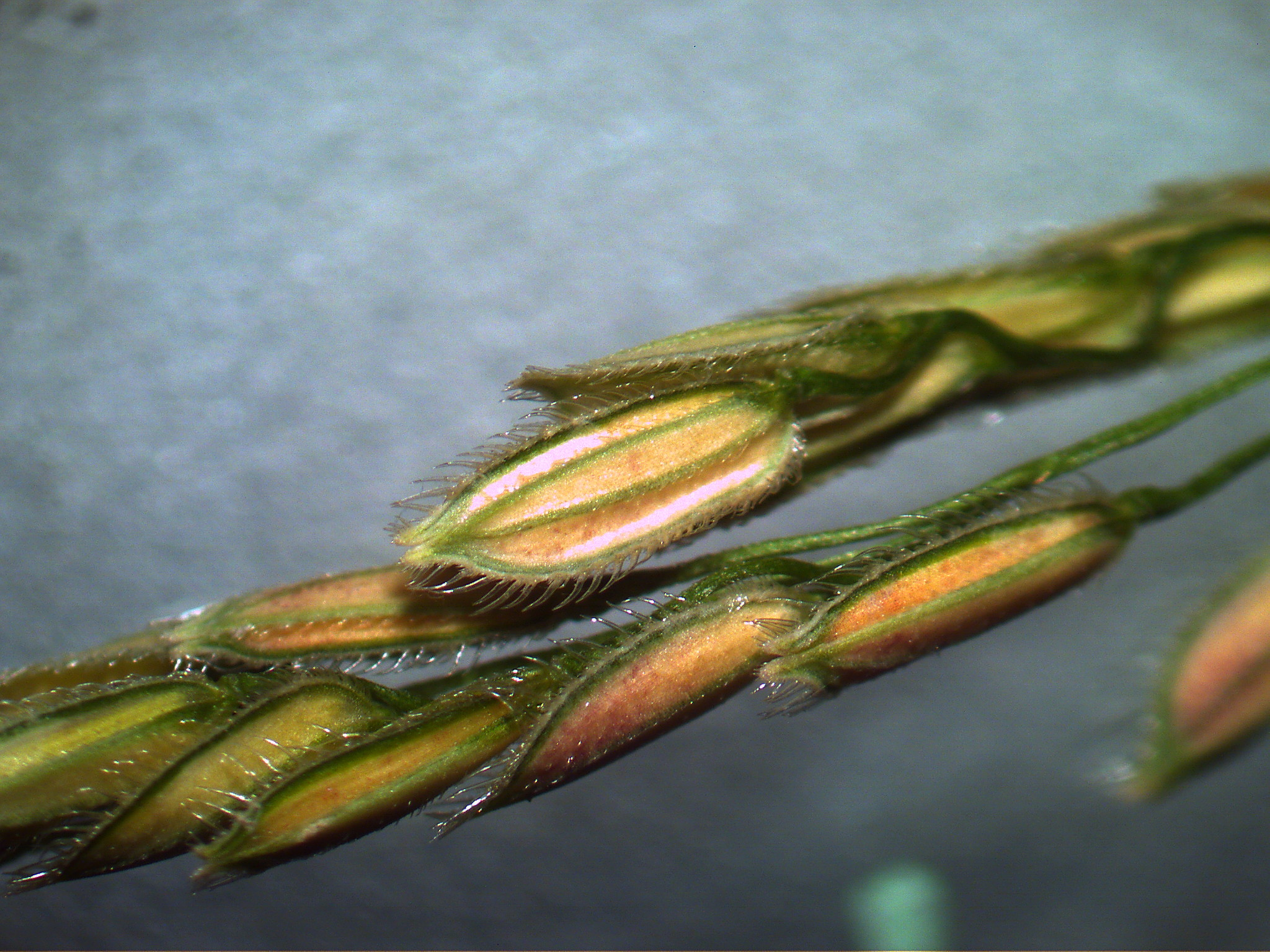
Spikelets

The grass is a weed of several crops, including tea, rubber, maize, and sugarcane, but especially rice. It is a relative of the rice plant and it thrives in paddy fields. Its vegetation "carpets" clog irrigation waterways, causing flooding and erosion. It hosts many rice pests, including the brown planthopper, the green planthopper (Nilaparvata bakeri), the green rice leafhopper (Nephotettix malayanus), the rice gall midge (Orseolia oryzae), and the moth Helcystogramma arotraeum. It hosts the rice stem nematode, which causes ufra disease of rice. It is susceptible to many plant viruses that infect rice plants, such as rice grassy stunt virus, rice transitory yellowing virus, and rice tungro virus. It is susceptible to bacteria and fungi such as pathogenic Xanthomonas oryzae, which causes leaf blight of rice, and Cochliobolus miyabeanus, which causes brown spot.

== Uses ==
Despite its sharp leaf edges, the grass is palatable to cattle and it is maintained as a pasture grass on swampy land and cut for hay.

This species is a hyperaccumulator of heavy metals, with the ability to take up large amounts of chromium, copper, and nickel from water and soil. Its ability to absorb chromium in particular has been described as "extraordinary". It is considered to be a potential agent of phytoremediation in efforts to clean up metal-contaminated soils and water. Targets could include industrial wastewater, such as that discharged from electroplating factories, and the contaminated soils around such facilities.
