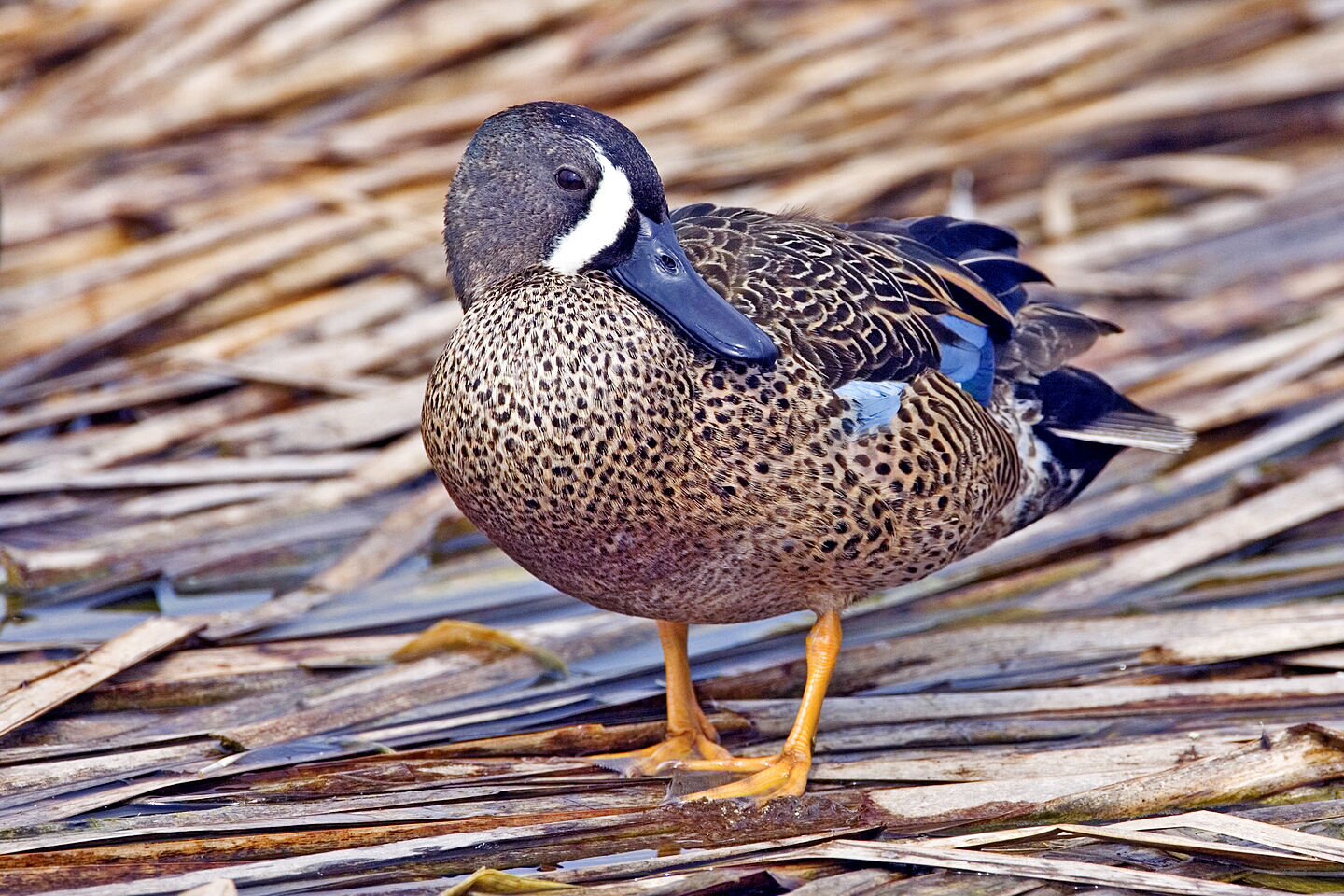
- Male in Texas
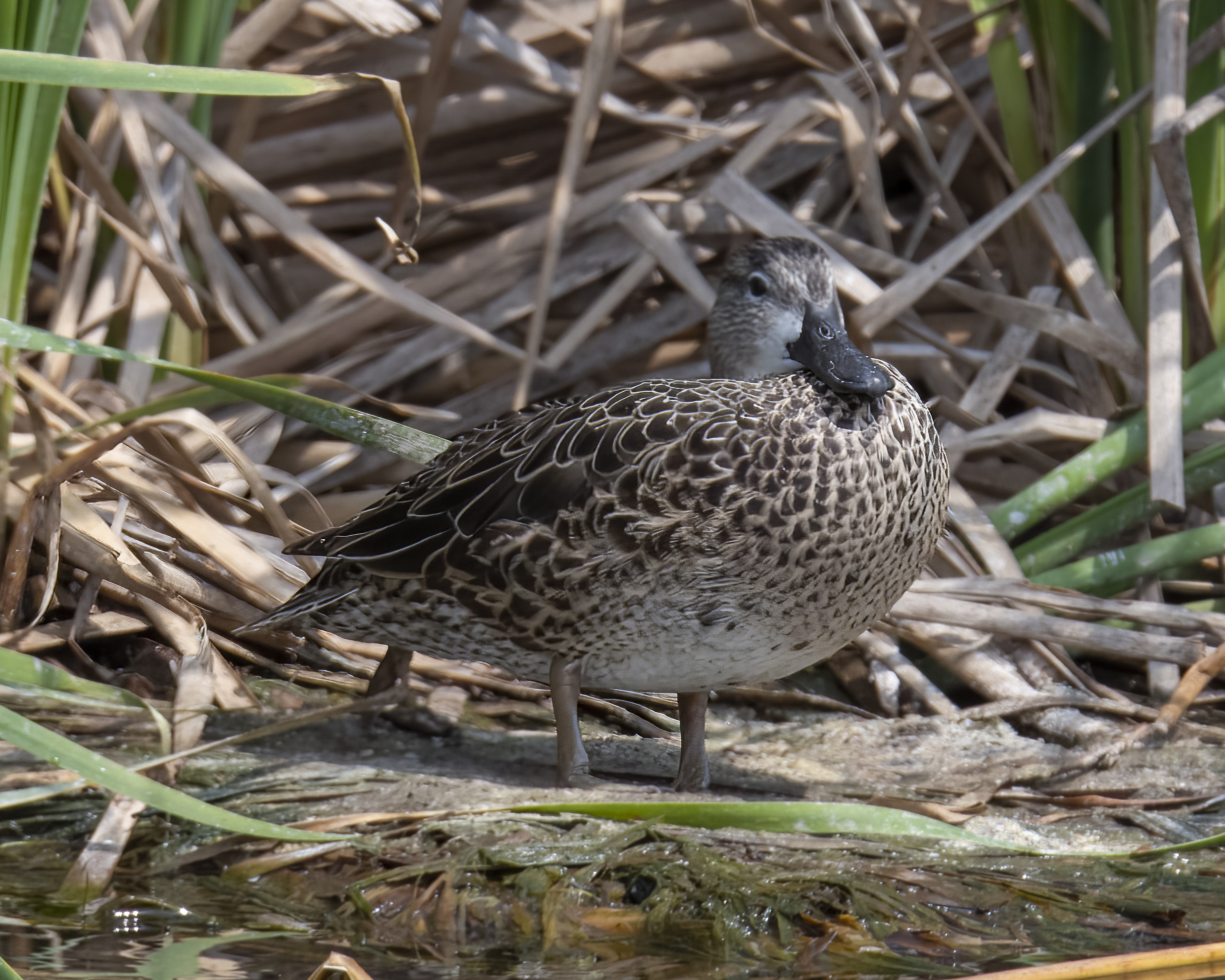
- Female

Conservation status
- Least Concern (IUCN 3.1)

- Secure (NatureServe)

Scientific classification
- Kingdom: Animalia
- Phylum: Chordata
- Class: Aves
- Order: Anseriformes
- Family: Anatidae
- Genus: Spatula
- Species: S. discors

Binomial name
- Spatula discors (Linnaeus, 1766)
- Breeding Migration Year-round Nonbreeding

Synonyms
- Querquedula discors (Linnaeus, 1766); Anas discors Linnaeus, 1766

= Blue-winged teal =

Species of bird

The blue-winged teal (Spatula discors) is a species of bird in the duck, goose, and swan family Anatidae. One of the smaller members of the dabbling duck group, it occurs in North America, where it breeds from southern Alaska to Nova Scotia, and south to northern Texas. It winters along the Pacific and Atlantic coasts and south into the Caribbean islands and Central America.

== Taxonomy ==
The first formal description of the blue-winged teal was by the Swedish naturalist Carl Linnaeus in 1766 in the twelfth edition of his Systema Naturae. He coined the binomial name Anas discors. A molecular phylogentic study comparing mitochondrial DNA sequences published in 2009 found that the genus Anas, as then defined, was non-monophyletic. The genus was subsequently split into four monophyletic genera with ten species including the blue-winged teal moved into the resurrected genus Spatula. This genus had been originally proposed by the German zoologist Friedrich Boie in 1822. The name Spatula is the Latin for a "spoon" or "spatula". The specific epithet discors is the Latin for "different" or "at variance".

== Description ==
Call

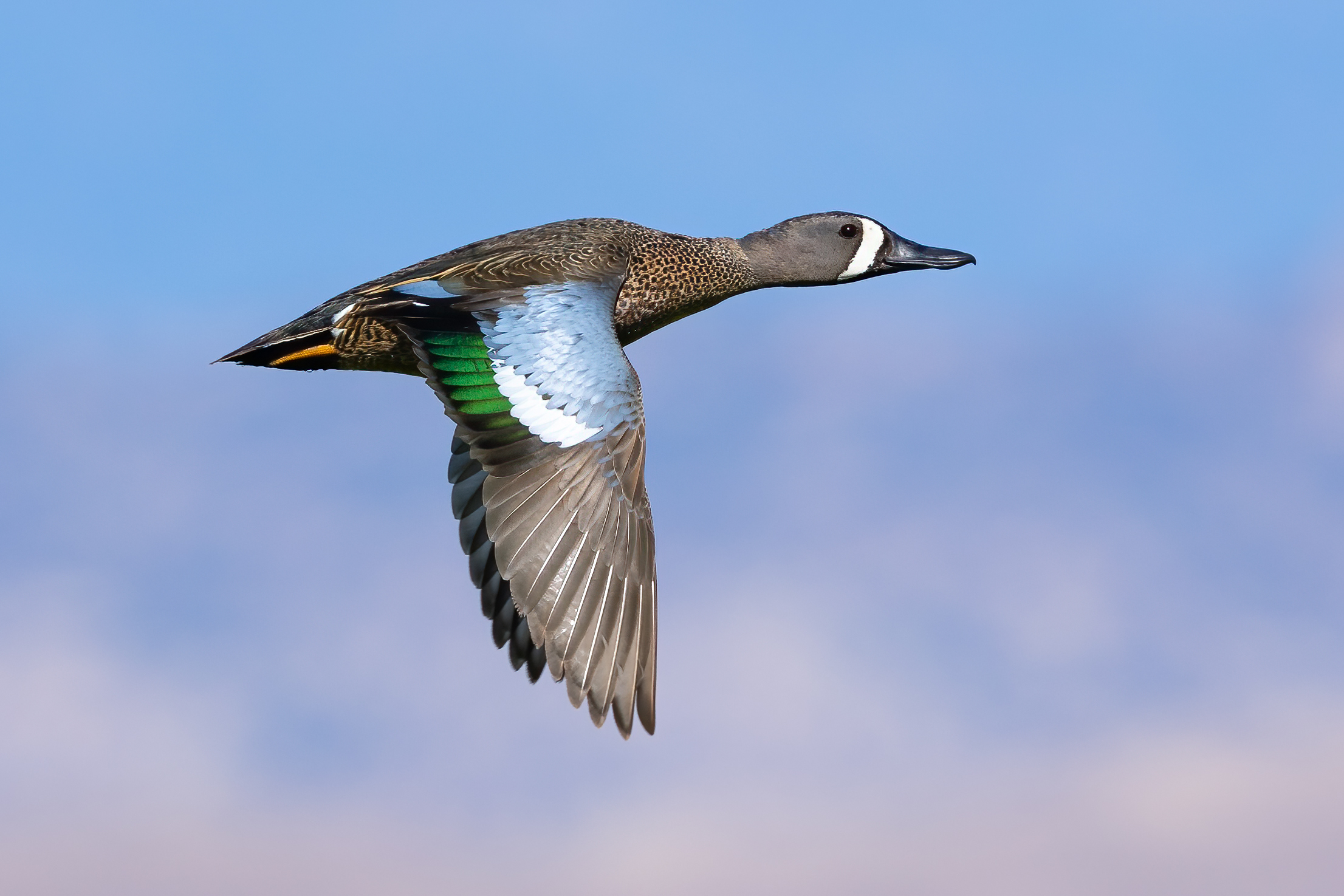
Blue-winged teal drake in flight at Sacramento National Wildlife Refuge

The blue-winged teal is 40 cm (16 in) long, with a wingspan of 58 cm (23 in), and a weight of 370 g (13 oz). The adult male has a greyish blue head with a white facial crescent, a light brown body with a white patch near the rear and a black tail. The adult female is mottled brown, and has a whitish area at base of bill. Both sexes have sky-blue wing coverts, a green speculum, and yellow legs. They have two molts per year and a third molt in their first year. The call of the male is a short whistle; the female's call is a soft quack.

== Distribution ==
The range is all of North America except western and northern Alaska, northern Yukon Territory, northern Northwest Territories and the northeastern area of Canada. Blue-winged teal are rare in the desert southwest, and the west coast. The breeding habitat of the blue-winged teal is marshes and ponds.

The breeding range extends from east-central Alaska and southern Mackenzie District east to southern Quebec and southwestern Newfoundland. In the contiguous United States it breeds from northeast California east to central Louisiana, central Tennessee, and the Atlantic Coast. The western blue-winged teal inhabits that part of the breeding range west of the Appalachian Mountains. Some populations of blue-winged teals nest along the Atlantic Coast from New Brunswick to Pea Island, North Carolina.

They migrate in flocks to winter in to the south of its breeding range. During migration, some birds may fly long distances over open ocean. They are occasional vagrants to Europe, where their yellow legs are a distinction from other small ducks like the common teal and garganey, and in recent years have been annual vagrants in Britain and Ireland. The blue-winged teal winters from southern California to western and southern Texas, the Gulf Coast to the Atlantic Coast, the Caribbean, and south to Central and South America. It is often seen wintering as far south as Brazil and central Chile.

== Habitat ==
Blue-winged teal inhabit shoreline more often than open water and prefer calm water or sluggish currents to fast water. They inhabit inland marshes, lakes, ponds, pools, and shallow streams with dense emergent vegetation. In coastal areas, breeding occurs in salt-marsh meadows with adjoining ponds or creeks. Blue-winged teal use rocks protruding above water, muskrat houses, trunks or limbs of fallen trees, bare stretches of shoreline, or mud flats for resting sites.

Blue-winged teal winter on shallow inland freshwater marshes and brackish and saltwater marshes. They build their nests on dry ground in grassy sites such as bluegrass meadows, hayfields, and sedge meadows. They will also nest in areas with very short, sparse vegetation. Blue-winged teal generally nest within several hundred yards of open water; however, nests have been found as far as 1.61 km (1 mi) away from water. Where the habitat is good, they nest communally.

Blue-winged teal often use heavy growth of bulrushes and cattails as escape cover. Grasses, sedges, and hayfields provide nesting cover for these ducks. Erik Fritzell reported that blue-winged teal nests located in light to sparse cover were more successful than those in heavy cover. Nesting success was 47% on grazed areas and 14% on ungrazed areas.

The blue-winged teal is primarily found in the northern prairies and parklands. It is the most abundant duck in the mixed-grass prairies of the Dakotas and the prairie provinces of Canada. The blue-winged teal is also found in wetlands of boreal forest associations, shortgrass prairies, tallgrass prairies, and deciduous woodlands.

This duck commonly inhabits wetland communities dominated by bulrush (Scirpus spp.), cattail (Typha spp.), pondweed (Potamogeton spp.), sedges (Carex spp.), widgeongrass (Ruppia maritima), and other emergent and aquatic vegetation. During molting, it often remains among extensive beds of bulrushes and cattails. The blue-winged teal favors areas dominated by bluegrass (Poa spp.) for nesting. Hayfields and plant communities of buckbrush (Ceonothus cuneatus) and sedges are also important as nest sites.

== Behavior ==
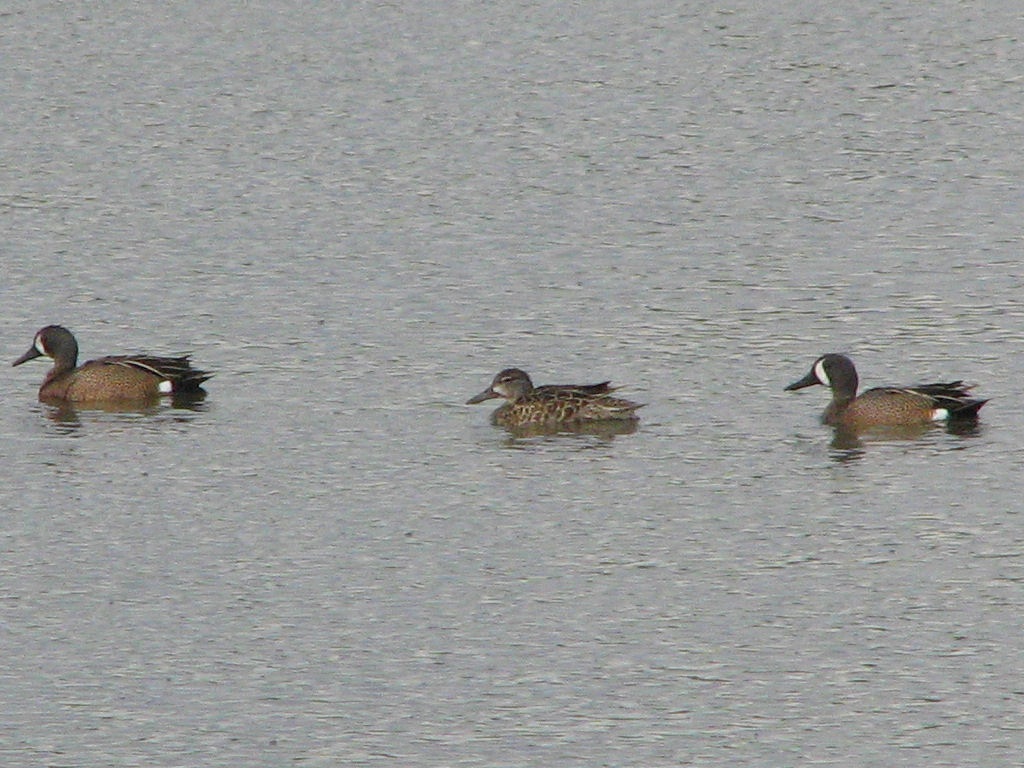
Males and a female, Richmond, British Columbia

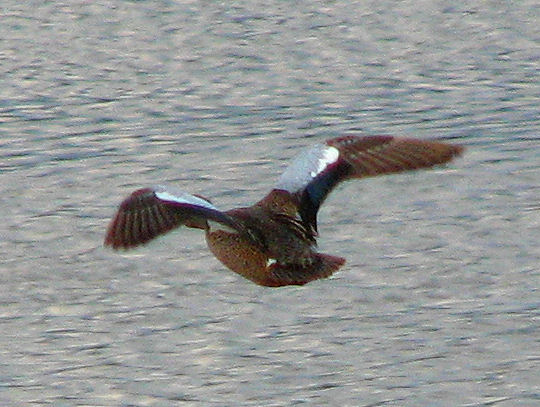
In flight, Ladner, British Columbia

These birds feed by dabbling in shallow water at the edge of marshes or open water. They mainly eat plants; their diet may include molluscs and aquatic insects.

Blue-winged teal are generally the first ducks south in the fall and the last ones north in the spring. Adult drakes depart the breeding grounds well before adult hens and immatures. Most blue-winged teal flocks seen after mid-September are composed largely of adult hens and immatures. The northern regions experience a steady decline in blue-winged teal populations from early September until early November. Blue-winged teal in central migration areas tend to remain through September, then diminish rapidly during October, with small numbers remaining until December. Large numbers of blue-winged teal appear on wintering grounds in Florida, Louisiana, and Texas in September.

=== Reproduction ===
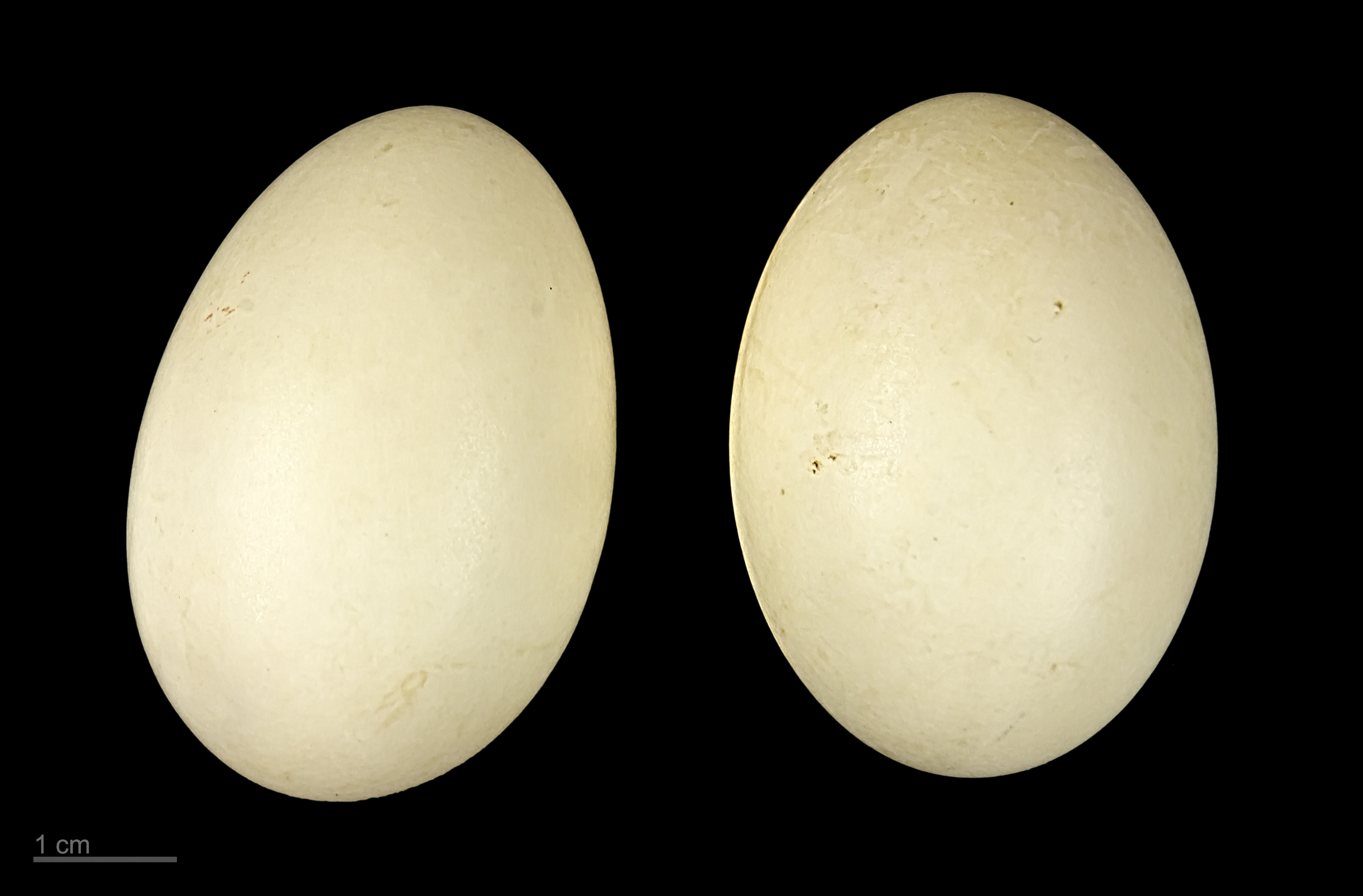
Anas discors - MHNT

The onset of courtship among immature blue-winged teal often starts in late January or early February. In areas south of the breeding grounds, blue-winged teal are more active in courtship during the spring migration than are most other ducks.

Blue-winged teal are among the last dabbling ducks to nest, generally nesting between April 15 and May 15. Few nests are started after mid-July. Chronology of nesting can vary from year to year as a result of weather conditions. At Delta Marshes, Manitoba, blue-winged teal nesting was delayed a week in 1950 due to abnormally cold weather. The nest is a shallow depression on the ground lined with grass and down, usually surrounded by vegetation.

Blue-winged teal generally lay 10 to 12 eggs. Delayed nesting and re-nesting efforts have substantially smaller clutches, averaging five to six eggs. Clutch size can also vary with the age of the hen. Yearlings tend to lay smaller clutches. Eggs measure 3.8–5.2 cm (1.5–2 in) in length and 2.9–3.7 cm (1.1–1.5 in) in width. Incubation takes 21 to 27 days. Blue-winged teal are sexually mature after their first winter. During incubation, the drake leaves its mate and moves to suitable molting cover where it becomes flightless for a period of 3 to 4 weeks.

Blue-winged teal ducklings can walk to water within 12 hours after hatching but do not fledge until 6 to 7 weeks.

=== Food habits ===
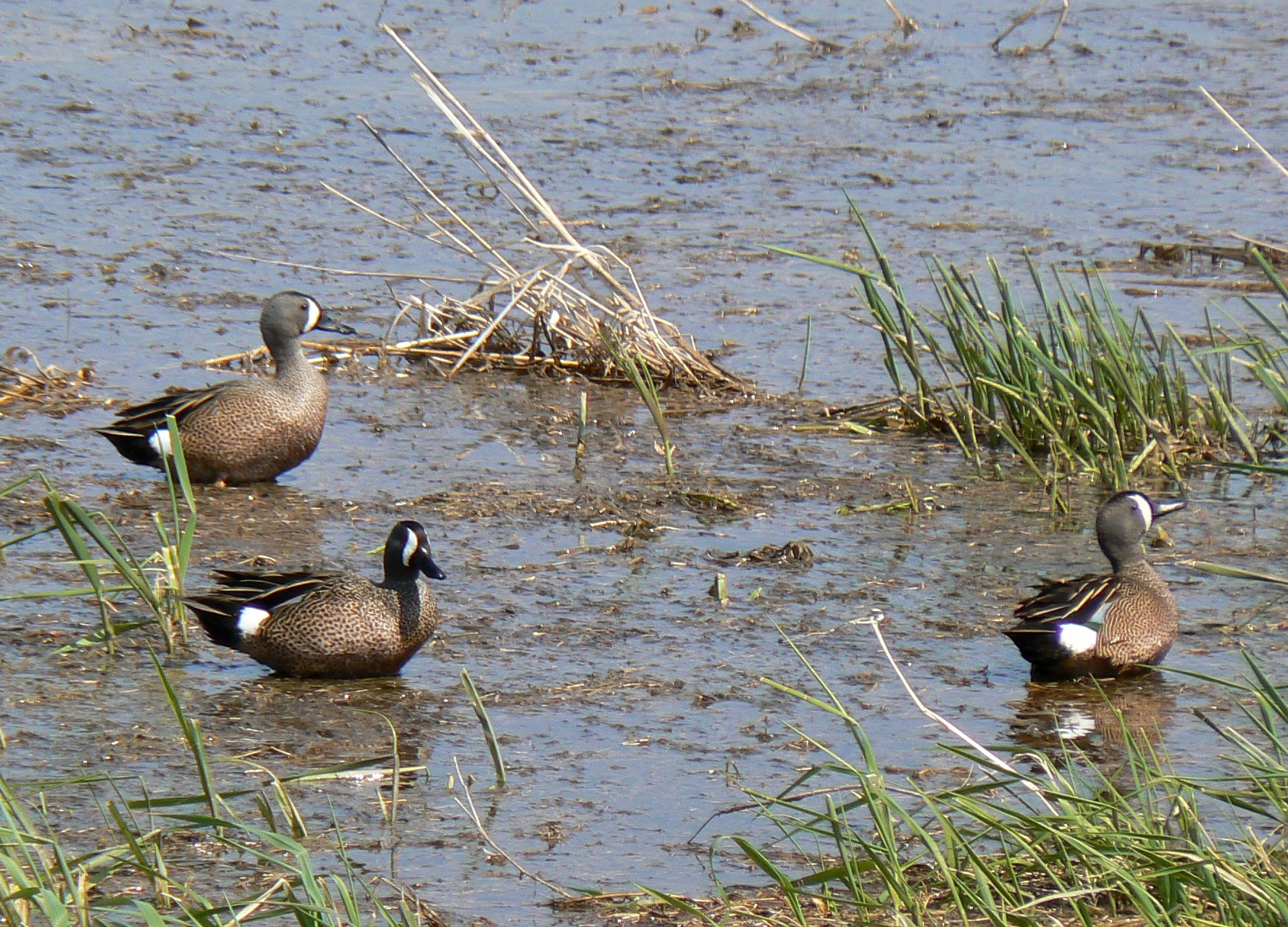
Males in Sarpy County, Nebraska

Blue-winged teal are surface feeders and prefer to feed on mud flats, in fields, or in shallow water where there is floating and shallowly submerged vegetation plus abundant small aquatic animal life. They mostly eat vegetative matter consisting of seeds or stems and leaves of sedge, grass, pondweed, smartweed (Polygonum spp.), duckweed (Lemna spp.), Widgeongrass, and muskgrass (Chara spp.). The seeds of plants that grow on mud flats, such as nutgrass (Cyperus spp.), smartweed, millet (Panicum spp.), and Rice Cut-grass (Leersia oryzoides), are avidly consumed by this duck. One-fourth of the food consumed by blue-winged teal is animal matter such as mollusks, crustaceans, and insects.

Juveniles surface feeding

== Predators ==
Common predators of blue-winged teal include humans, snakes, snapping turtles (Chleydra serpentina), dogs, cats, muskellunge (Esox masquinongy), American crows (Corvus brachyrhynchos), magpies (Pica spp.), ground squirrels, coyotes (Canis latrans), red foxes (Vulpes fulva), gray foxes (Urocyon cinereoargenteus), raccoons (Procyon lotor), long-tailed weasels (Mustela frenata), American minks (Mustela vison), striped skunks (Mephitis mephitis), spotted skunks (Spilogale putorius), and American badgers (Taxidea taxus).

During one study, about half of the nest failures of blue-winged teal were caused by mammals. Striped and Spotted Skunks were responsible for two-thirds of these losses. All nest losses caused by birds were attributed to either crows or magpies.
