= Rhynchoryza =

Scientific classification
- Kingdom: Plantae
- Clade: Tracheophytes
- Clade: Angiosperms
- Clade: Monocots
- Clade: Commelinids
- Order: Poales
- Family: Poaceae
- Subfamily: Oryzoideae
- Tribe: Oryzeae
- Subtribe: Zizaniinae
- Genus: Rhynchoryza; Baill.
- Species: R. subulata

Binomial name
- Rhynchoryza subulata (Nees) Baill.

Synonyms
- Oryza sect. Rhynchoryza (Baill.) Roshev.; Oryza subg. Rhynchoryza (Baill.) Pilg.; Oryza subulata Nees; Oryza caudata Döll

Genus of plants

Rhynchoryza is a genus of plants in the grass family. The only known species is Rhynchoryza subulata, native to Brazil (Rio Grande do Sul), Argentina (Santa Fe, Buenos Aires, Entre Rios, Corrientes, Chaco), Paraguay and Uruguay.
