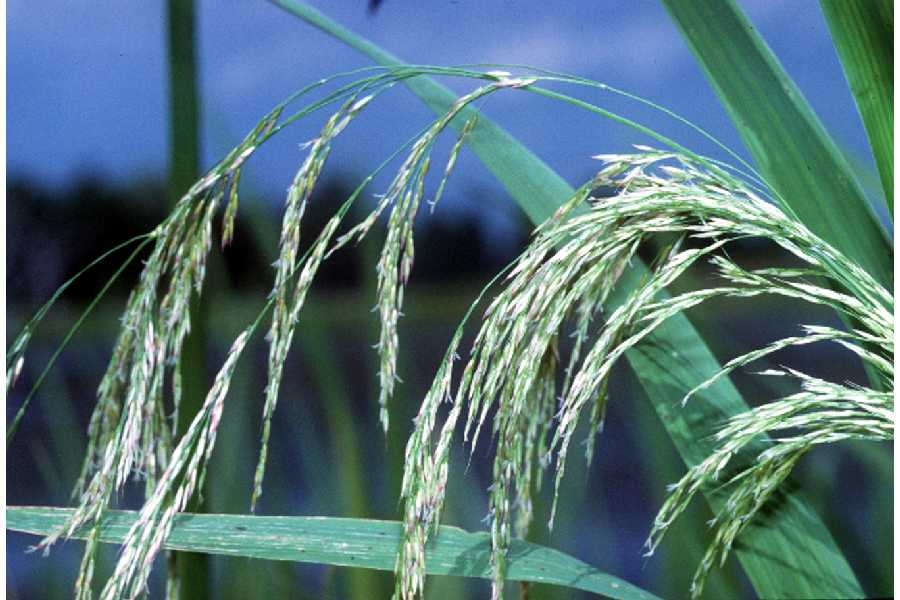
- Zizaniopsis miliacea

Scientific classification
- Kingdom: Plantae
- Clade: Embryophytes
- Clade: Tracheophytes
- Clade: Angiosperms
- Clade: Monocots
- Clade: Commelinids
- Order: Poales
- Family: Poaceae
- Subfamily: Oryzoideae
- Tribe: Oryzeae
- Subtribe: Zizaniinae
- Genus: Zizaniopsis; Doll & Asch.

Type species
- Zizaniopsis microstachya (Nees) Döll & Asch.

= Zizaniopsis =

Genus of plants

Zizaniopsis is a genus of plants in the grass family, Poaceae, native to North and South America.

Species

- Zizaniopsis bonariensis (Balansa & Poitr.) Speg. – Uruguay, Brazil (Rio Grande do Sul), Argentina (Buenos Aires, Entre Ríos, Corrientes)
- Zizaniopsis killipii Swallen – Colombia (Chocó)
- Zizaniopsis microstachya (Nees) Döll & Asch. – Uruguay, Brazil, Argentina
- Zizaniopsis miliacea (Michx.) Döll & Asch. – southeastern + south-central United States (TX to IL + MD), Mexico (Jalisco, Veracruz, Michoacán)
- Zizaniopsis villanensis Quarín – Argentina
