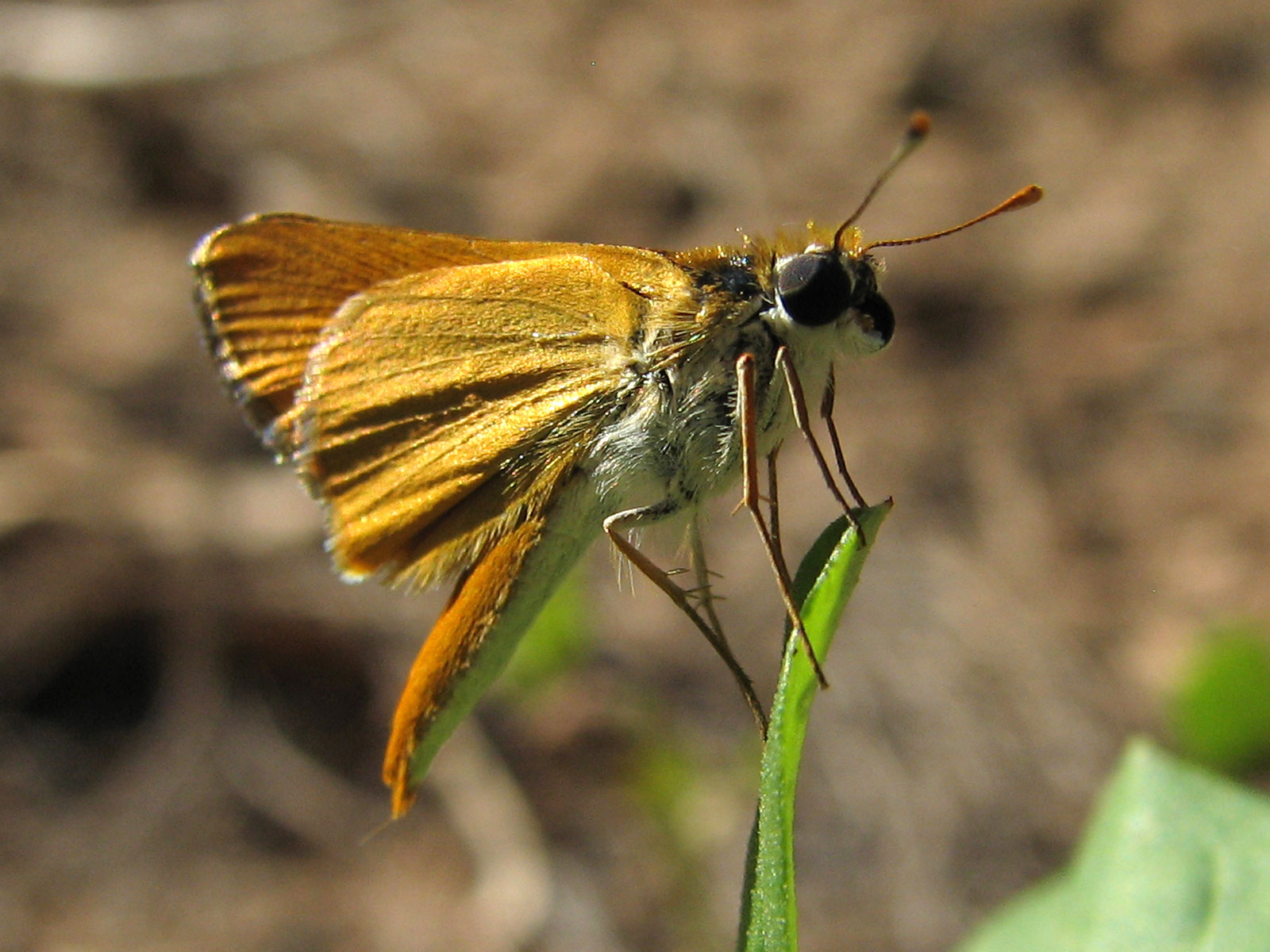
- Copaeodes aurantiaca

Scientific classification
- Kingdom: Animalia
- Phylum: Arthropoda
- Class: Insecta
- Order: Lepidoptera
- Family: Hesperiidae
- Subtribe: Thymelicina
- Genus: Copaeodes; Speyer, 1877

= Copaeodes =

Genus of butterflies

Copaeodes is a genus of skippers in the family Hesperiidae.

== Species ==
- Copaeodes aurantiaca (Hewitson, 1868)
- Copaeodes castanea Mielke, 1969
- Copaeodes eoa Smith, Miller & McKenzie, 1991
- Copaeodes jean Evans, 1955
- Copaeodes minima (Edwards, 1870)
- Copaeodes stillmani Bell & Comstock, 1948

=== Former species ===
- Copaeodes eunus Edwards, 1881 - transferred to Pseudocopaeodes eunus (Edwards, 1881)
