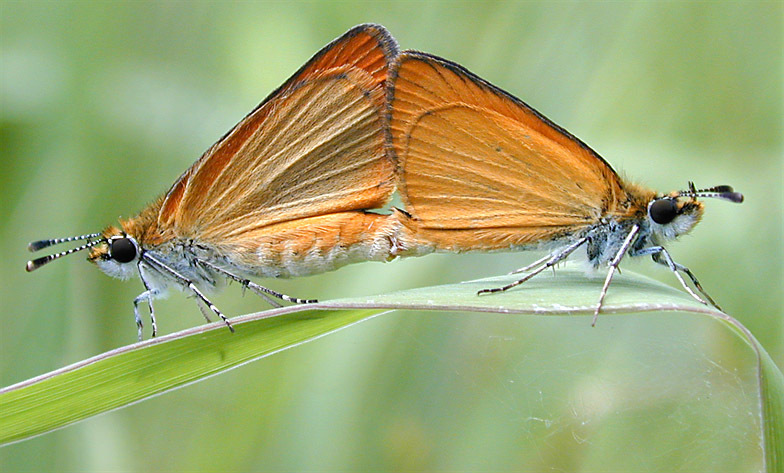
- Ancyloxypha numitor

Scientific classification
- Kingdom: Animalia
- Phylum: Arthropoda
- Class: Insecta
- Order: Lepidoptera
- Family: Hesperiidae
- Subfamily: Hesperiinae
- Tribe: Hesperiini
- Subtribe: Apaustina
- Genus: Ancyloxypha; C. Felder, 1862

Species
- See text

Synonyms
- List: Ancyloxipha Hewitson, 1868; Ancyloxyphia Maynard, 1891; Ancyloxpha Skinner, 1898); Anchyloxypha Woodworth, 1912; Anciloxipha Giacomelli, 1923; Anoylexypha S. Moore, 1937; Ancyloxypa Mielke, 1980

= Ancyloxypha =

Genus of butterflies

Ancyloxypha is a genus of skipper butterflies in the subfamily Hesperiinae.

== List of species ==
Listed alphabetically.

- Ancyloxypha arene (Edwards, 1871) – tropical least skipper
- Ancyloxypha aurea (Hayward, 1940)
- Ancyloxypha dryas (Hayward, 1942)
- Ancyloxypha melanoneura (C. & R. Felder, 1867)
- Ancyloxypha nitedula (Burmeister, 1878)
- Ancyloxypha numitor (Fabricius, 1793) – least skipper or least skipperling
- Ancyloxypha ramba (Evans, 1955)
