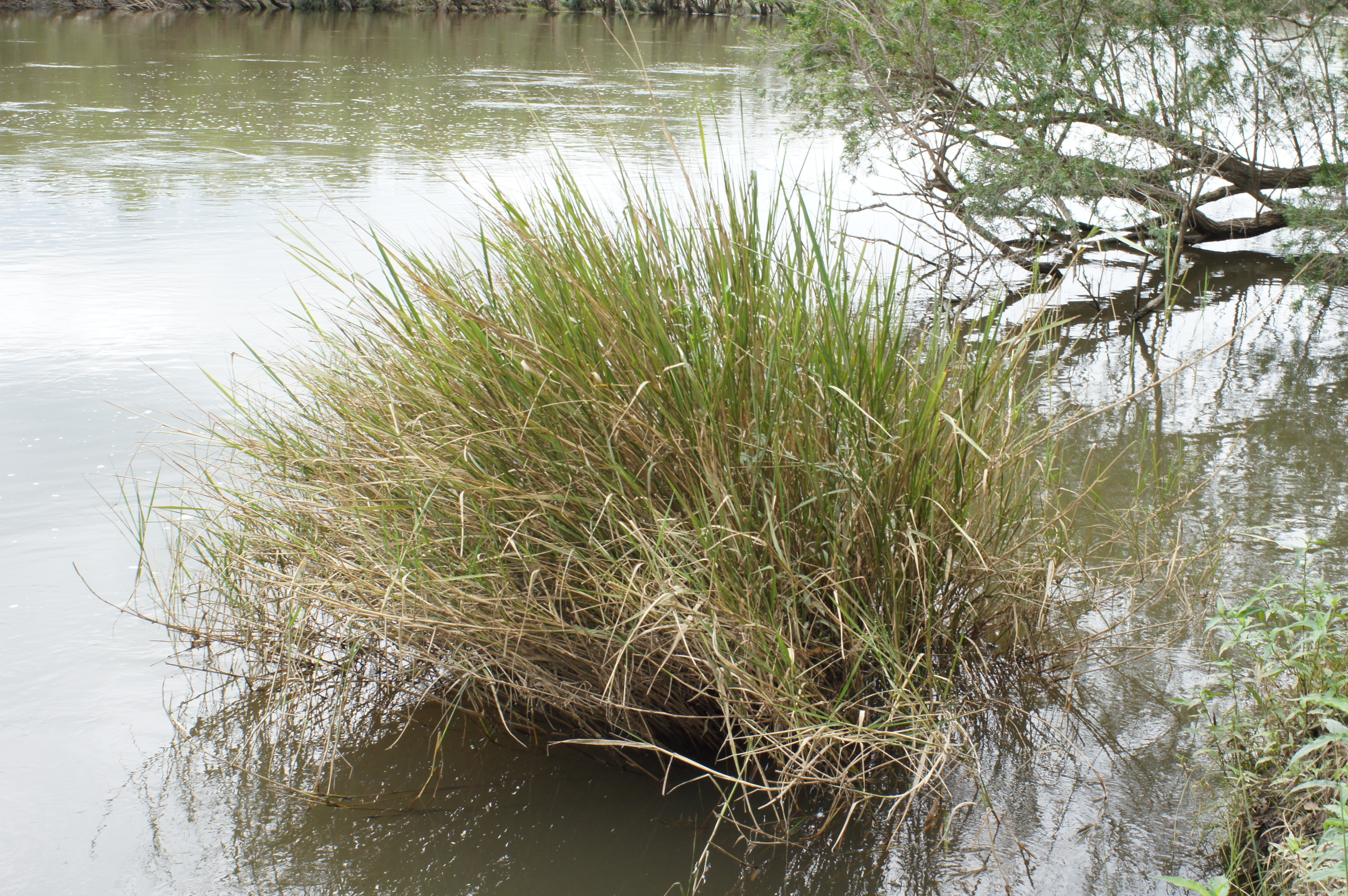

Scientific classification
- Kingdom: Plantae
- Clade: Tracheophytes
- Clade: Angiosperms
- Clade: Monocots
- Clade: Commelinids
- Order: Poales
- Family: Poaceae
- Subfamily: Oryzoideae
- Tribe: Oryzeae
- Subtribe: Zizaniinae
- Genus: Potamophila; R.Br. 1810, not Schrank 1821 (Phytolaccaceae)
- Species: P. parviflora

Binomial name
- Potamophila parviflora R.Br.

Synonyms
- Oryza parviflora (R.Br.) Baill.

= Potamophila =

Hastings River reed

Genus of plants

Potamophila is a genus of Australian plants in the grass family.

The only known species is Potamophila parviflora. It is endemic to New South Wales. Common names include Hastings River reed.

This species is a reedlike aquatic perennial grass growing up to 1.5 meters tall. It grows in and next to rivers.

It is a member of the rice tribe, Oryzeae. Among its closest relatives are the wild rice species of genus Zizania.
