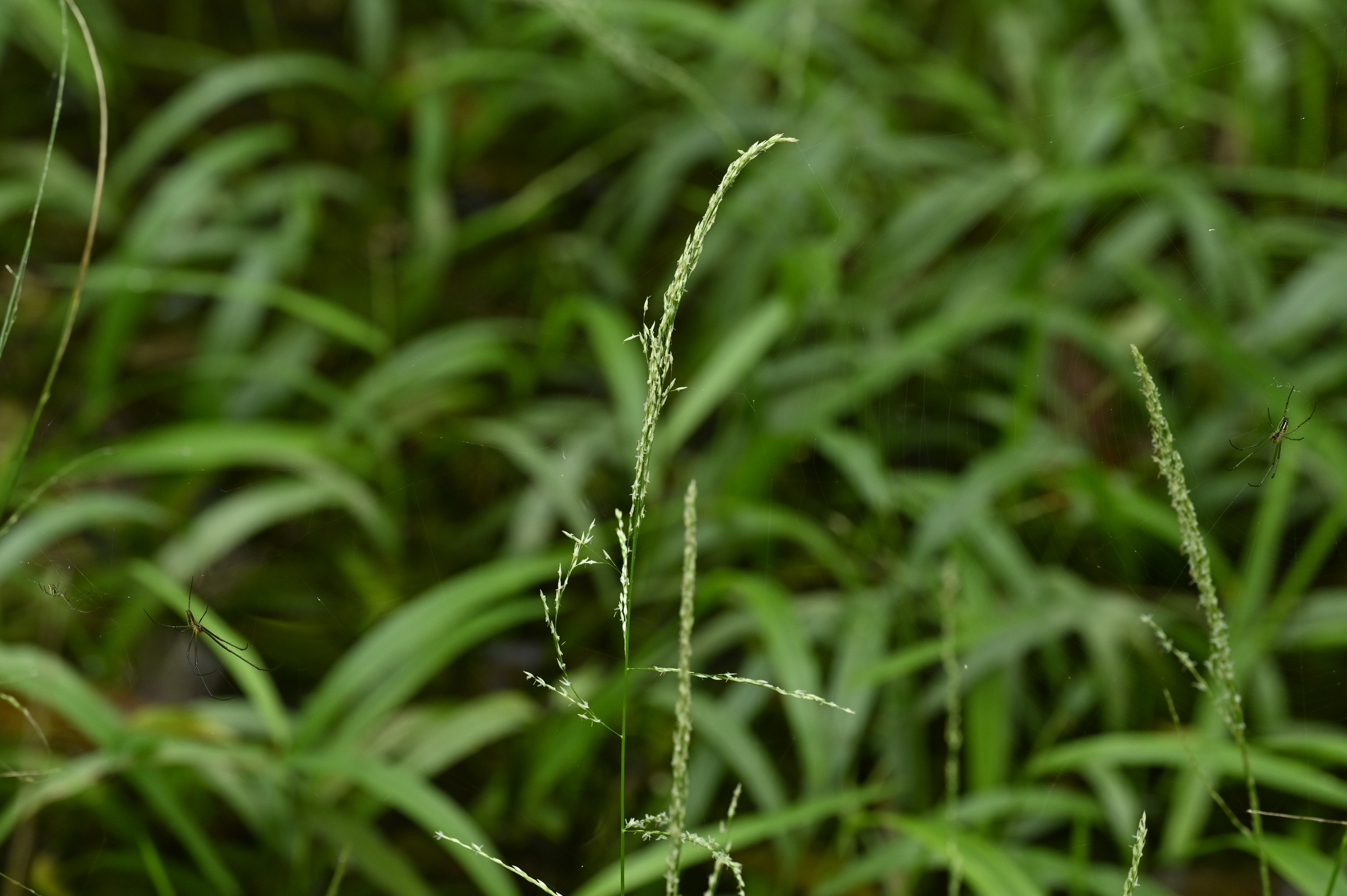
- Chikusichloa mutica

Scientific classification
- Kingdom: Plantae
- Clade: Tracheophytes
- Clade: Angiosperms
- Clade: Monocots
- Clade: Commelinids
- Order: Poales
- Family: Poaceae
- Subfamily: Oryzoideae
- Tribe: Oryzeae
- Subtribe: Zizaniinae
- Genus: Chikusichloa; Koidz.

Type species
- Chikusichloa aquatica Koidz.

= Chikusichloa =

Genus of plants

Chikusichloa is a genus of Asian plants in the grass family.

Species

- Chikusichloa aquatica Koidz. - Jiangsu, Honshu, Kyushu
- Chikusichloa brachyathera Ohwi - Nansei-shoto
- Chikusichloa mutica Keng - Guangdong, Guangxi, Hainan, Sumatra

== See also ==
- List of Poaceae genera
