= Nanooravia =

Scientific classification
- Kingdom: Plantae
- Clade: Tracheophytes
- Clade: Angiosperms
- Clade: Monocots
- Clade: Commelinids
- Order: Poales
- Family: Poaceae
- Subfamily: Panicoideae
- Supertribe: Andropogonodae
- Tribe: Andropogoneae
- Subtribe: Ischaeminae
- Genus: Nanooravia; Kiran Raj & Sivad.
- Species: N. santapaui

Binomial name
- Nanooravia santapaui (M.R.Almeida) Kiran Raj & Sivad.

Synonyms
- Dimeria santapaui M.R.Almeida; Dimeria keralae N.C.Nair, Sreek. & V.J.Nair; Dimeria kalliyadense P.Biju, Josekutty & Augustine; Nanooravia kayyurense Shaju, Rajendrapr., Rijuraj & Ratheesh

Genus of plants

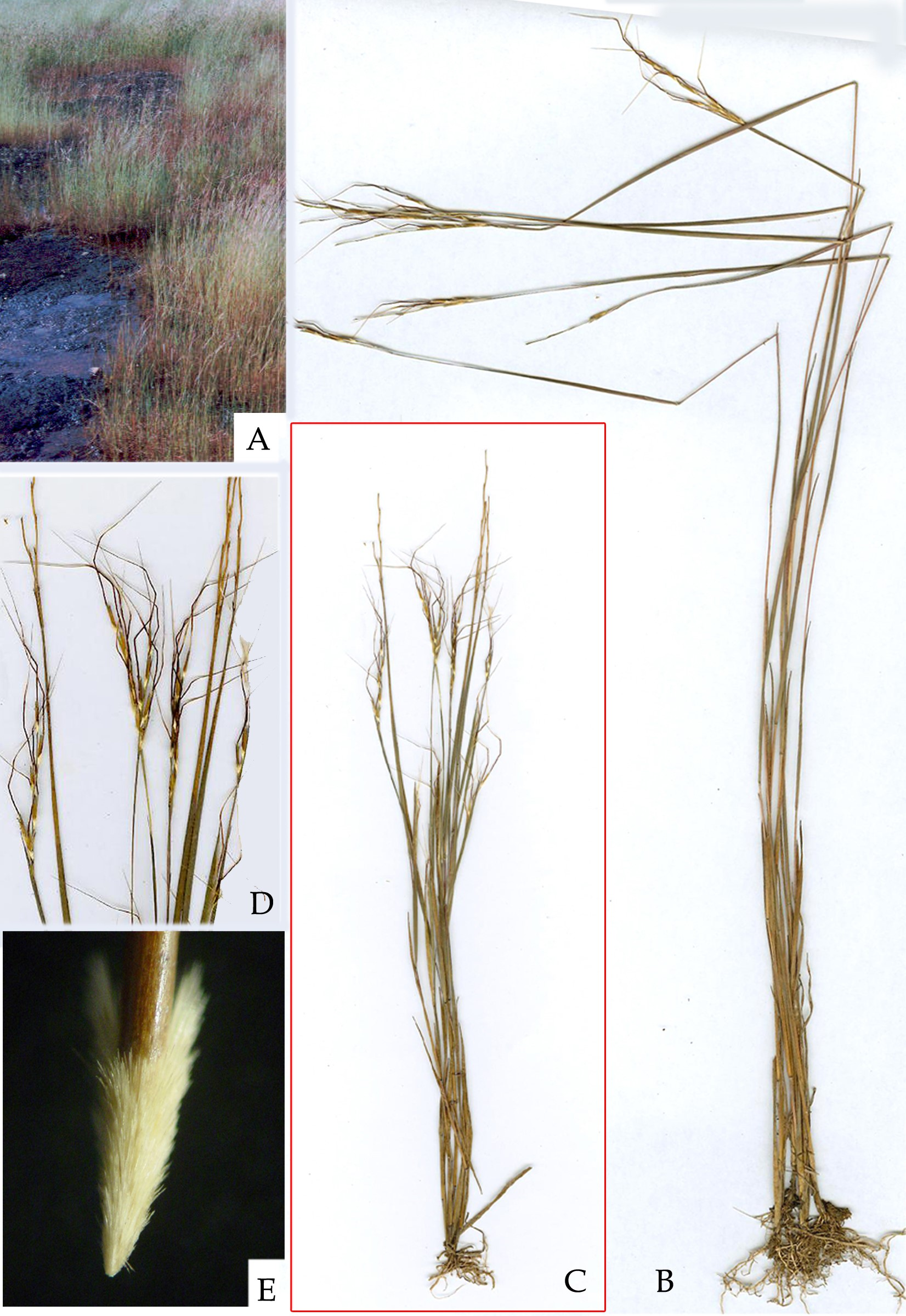
Habitat and morpho-variants of Nanooravia santapaui (M.R.Almeida) Kiran Raj & Sivad. A. Species grow along the lateritic hilly slopes of Kasaragode, Kerala. B. Long variant with culm bent at the uppermost node. C. Short variant. D. Intertwined inflorescence showing long awns of the spikelets. E. Callus of spikelet covered with golden yellow hairs

Nanooravia is a monotypic genus of flowering plants belonging to the family Poaceae. The only species is Nanooravia santapaui, an annual grass, and its native range is Southern India (Kerala, Karnataka).

The genus was circumscribed by MS Kiran Raj and M.Sivadasan, and published in Nord. J. Bot., Vol. 31 on page 161 in 2013. It is characterised by unusual intertwined inflorescence; solitary pedicelled spikelet with keel-less auricled glumes, and long callus covered with golden yellow hairs.

The genus name Nanooravia is in honour of Professor N. Ravi, who is an Indian botanist and environmentalist. His serious efforts were instrumental in recognising the Asramam Biodiversity Heritage Site (ABHS), Kollam, the first in Kerala State.

== See also ==
- Tribe Andropogoneae
- List of Poaceae genera
