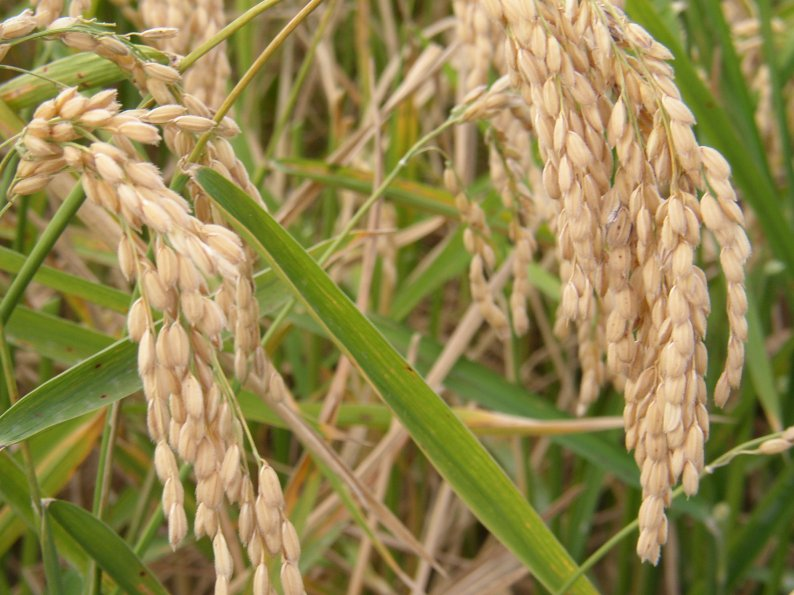
- Oryza sativa

Scientific classification
- Kingdom: Plantae
- Clade: Tracheophytes
- Clade: Angiosperms
- Clade: Monocots
- Clade: Commelinids
- Order: Poales
- Family: Poaceae
- Clade: BOP clade
- Subfamily: Oryzoideae
- Tribe: Oryzeae; Dumort. (1824)

Genera
- 11 genera, see text.

Synonyms
- Zizanieae Hitchc. (1920)

= Oryzeae =

Tribe of plants

Oryzeae is a tribe of flowering plants in the true grass family, Poaceae. It contains 11 genera, including both cultivated rice (Oryza) and wild rice (Zizania).

== Genera ==
There are 11 genera classified in two subtribes:

Oryzinae
- Leersia Sw.
- Maltebrunia Kunth
- Oryza L. (syn. Porteresia Tateoka)
- Prosphytochloa Schweick.
Zizaniinae
- Chikusichloa Koidz.
- Hygroryza Nees
- Luziola Juss.
- Potamophila R.Br.
- Rhynchoryza Baill.
- Zizania L.
- Zizaniopsis Doll & Asch.
