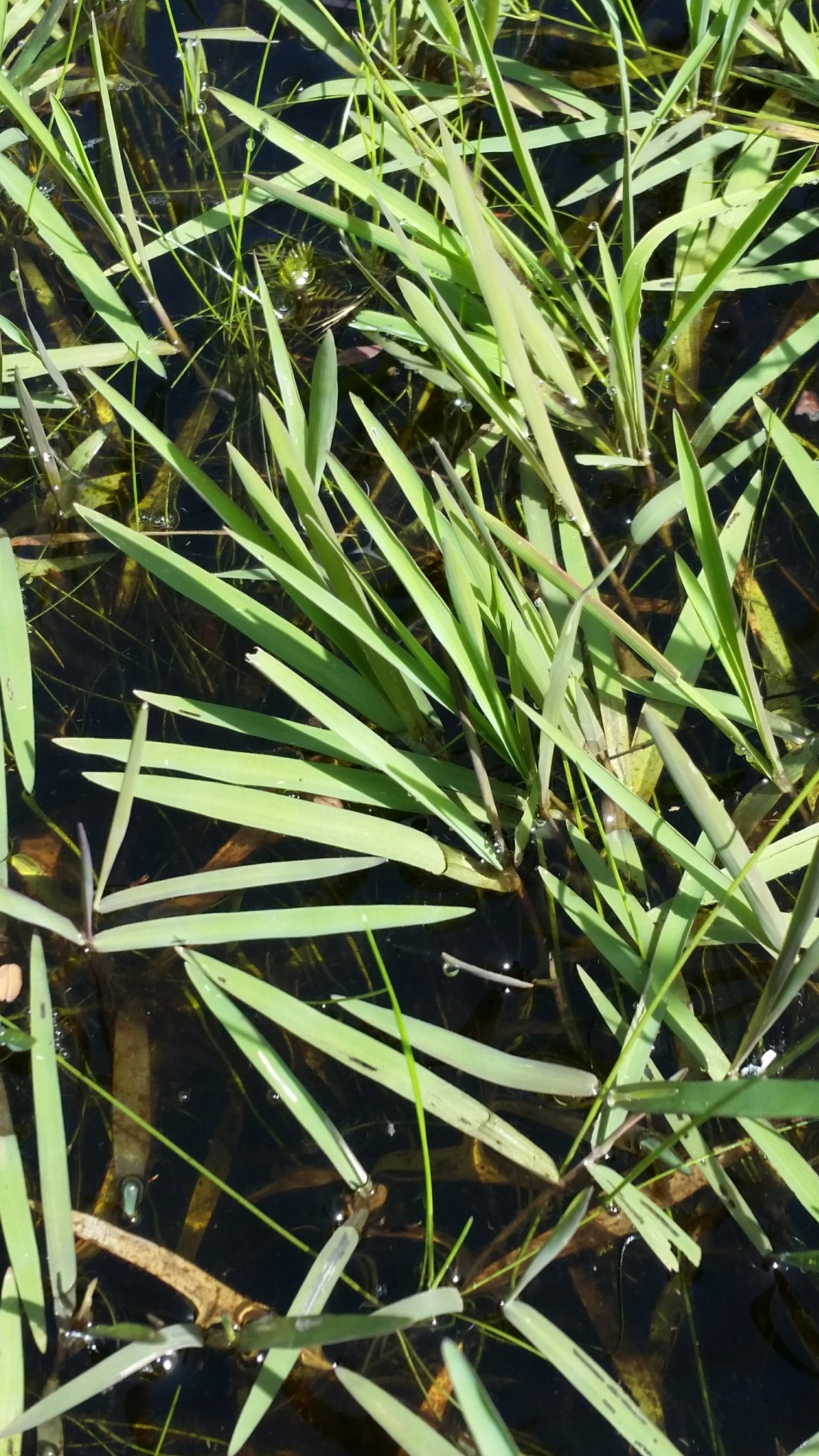
- L. fluitans

Scientific classification
- Kingdom: Plantae
- Clade: Tracheophytes
- Clade: Angiosperms
- Clade: Monocots
- Clade: Commelinids
- Order: Poales
- Family: Poaceae
- Subfamily: Oryzoideae
- Tribe: Oryzeae
- Subtribe: Zizaniinae
- Genus: Luziola; Juss.

Synonyms
- Hydrochloa P.Beauv.; Caryochloa Trin.; Arrozia Schrad. ex Kunth

= Luziola =

Genus of plants

Luziola (watergrass) is a genus of New World in the grass family, native to North and South America including the West Indies.

Species

- Luziola bahiensis (Steud.) Hitchc. - South America (Colombia to Argentina), Greater Antilles, Central America, USA (FL AL MS)
- Luziola brasiliana Moric. - Venezuela (Portuguesa, Apure, Bolívar, Barinas, Guárico), Brazil (Piauí, Bahia)
- Luziola brasiliensis (Trin.) Swallen - Venezuela (Guárico), Brazil (Piauí, Rio de Janeiro, São Paulo, Santa Catarina, Rio Grande do Norte)
- Luziola caespitosa Swallen - Brazil (Bahia)
- Luziola divergens Swallen - Minas Gerais
- Luziola fluitans (Michx.) Terrell & H.Rob. - Mexico, Guatemala, USA (TX LA AR MS AL GA FL NC SC)
- Luziola fragilis Swallen - Costa Rica, Venezuela (Guárico), Bolivia (Beni), Brazil (Mato Grosso, Minas Gerais, Paraná)
- Luziola gracillima Prodoehl - Mexico, Paraguay, Argentina
- Luziola peruviana J.F.Gmel. - Cuba; Latin America from Mexico to Uruguay; naturalized in United States (TX LA FL)
- Luziola spruceana Benth. ex Döll - Honduras, Trinidad, Brazil, Paraguay
- Luziola subintegra Swallen - from Mexico + Greater Antilles to Paraguay; naturalized in Florida
