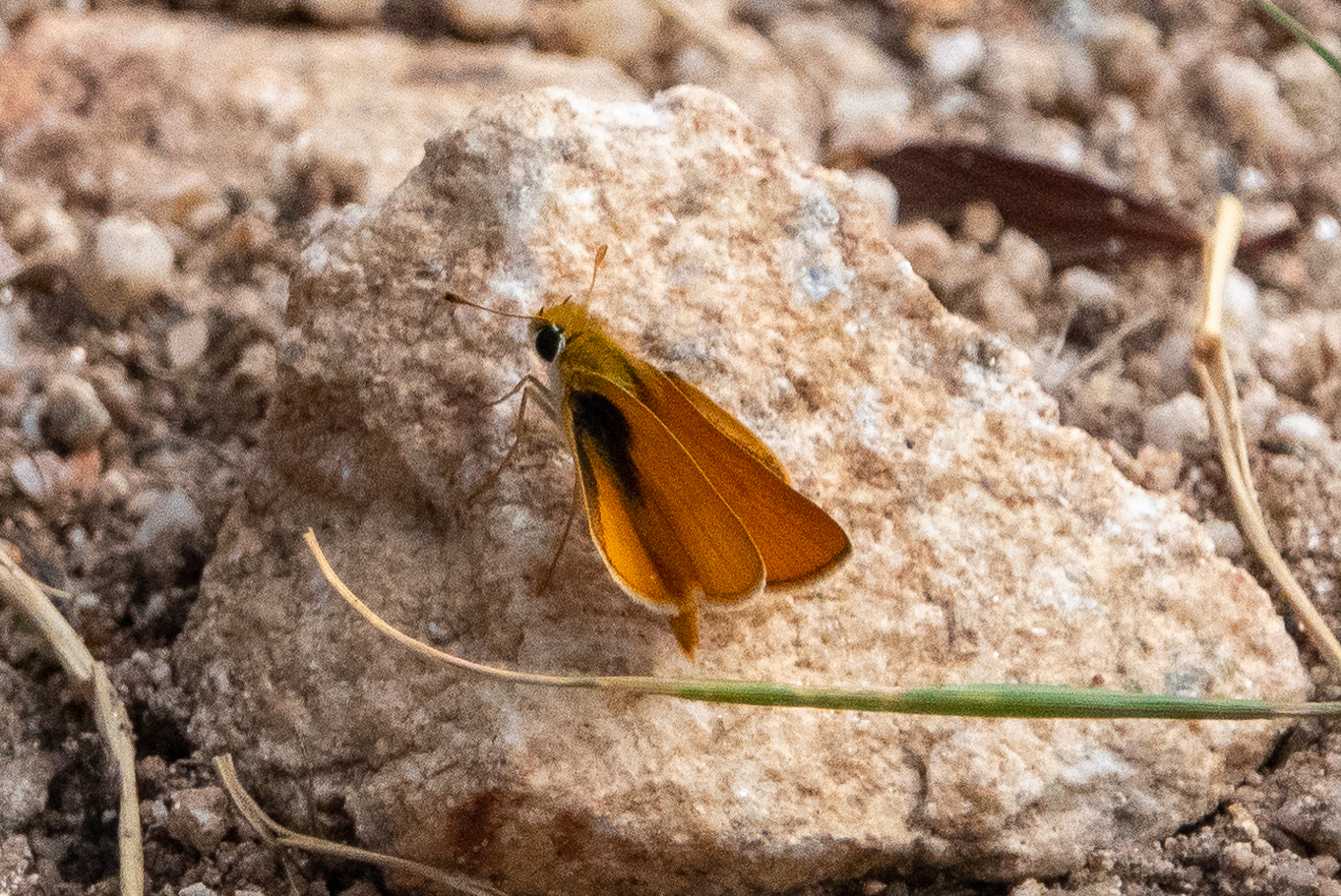

Scientific classification
- Kingdom: Animalia
- Phylum: Arthropoda
- Clade: Pancrustacea
- Class: Insecta
- Order: Lepidoptera
- Family: Hesperiidae
- Genus: Copaeodes
- Species: C. aurantiaca

Binomial name
- Copaeodes aurantiaca (Hewitson, 1868)

Synonyms
- Ancyloxypha simplex R. Felder, 1869; Copaeodes candida W. G. Wright, 1890; Hesperia waco W. H. Edwards, 1868; Heteropterus procris W. H. Edwards, 1871; Thymelicus macra Plötz, 1884

= Copaeodes aurantiaca =

Species of butterfly

Copaeodes aurantiaca, the orange skipperling, is a species of grass skipper in the butterfly family Hesperiidae. It is found in Central America and North America.
