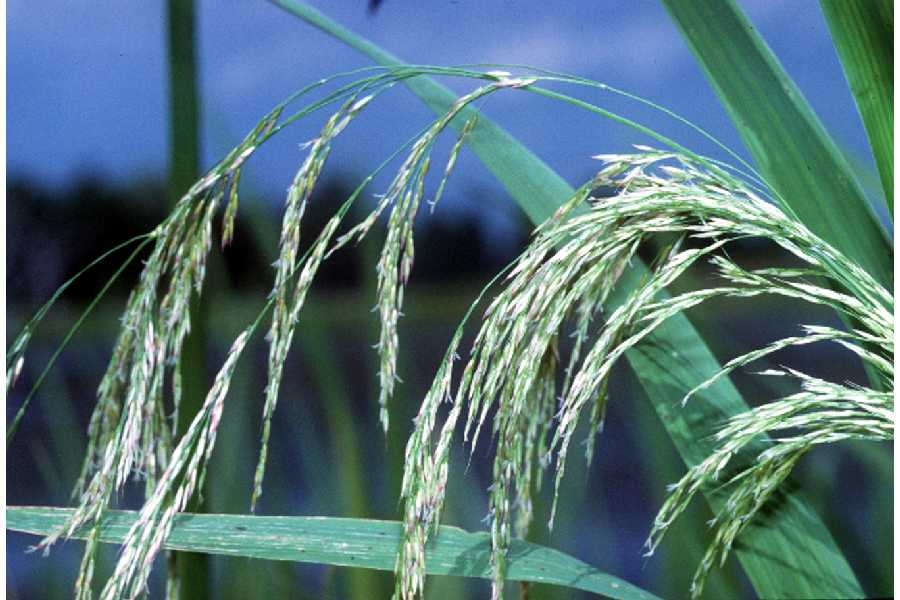

Conservation status
- Secure (NatureServe)

Scientific classification
- Kingdom: Plantae
- Clade: Embryophytes
- Clade: Tracheophytes
- Clade: Angiosperms
- Clade: Monocots
- Clade: Commelinids
- Order: Poales
- Family: Poaceae
- Genus: Zizaniopsis
- Species: Z. miliacea

Binomial name
- Zizaniopsis miliacea (Michx.) Döll & Asch.

Synonyms
- Zizania miliacea Michx.

= Zizaniopsis miliacea =

Species of flowering plant

Zizaniopsis miliacea is a species of flowering plant in the grass family, Poaceae. It is known by the common names giant cutgrass, water millet, and southern wildrice. The name giant cutgrass refers to the plant's large, rough-edged leaves, and the name southern wildrice refers to its resemblance to wildrice (Zizania spp.). It is native to the southeastern United States and it can also be found in central Mexico.

This perennial grass grows from rhizomes, producing stems up to 4 meters (13 ft) tall and 3.5 centimeters (1.4 in) wide. The stems root at nodes that come in contact with the substrate. It also spreads via functional stolons (decumbent rooting stems) and vegetative buds that erupt from the stems. The blue-green leaves are up to 1 meter (3 ft 3 in) long and 3 centimeters (1.2 in) wide. The panicles may exceed 80 centimeters 80 centimeters (31 in) long and are usually up to 20 centimeters (7.9 in) wide.

This plant grows in aquatic habitat, such as marshes and riverbanks. It is also common in former rice paddies. This grass forms large colonies by spreading via its stolon-like stems and rhizomes. It grows in fresh and brackish water, tolerating some salt in the water. It is sometimes planted for erosion control in wetlands. Large stands of the plant are sometimes considered to be a nuisance, providing "poor wildlife habitat"; however, it does provide nesting sites, cover, and food for animals.
