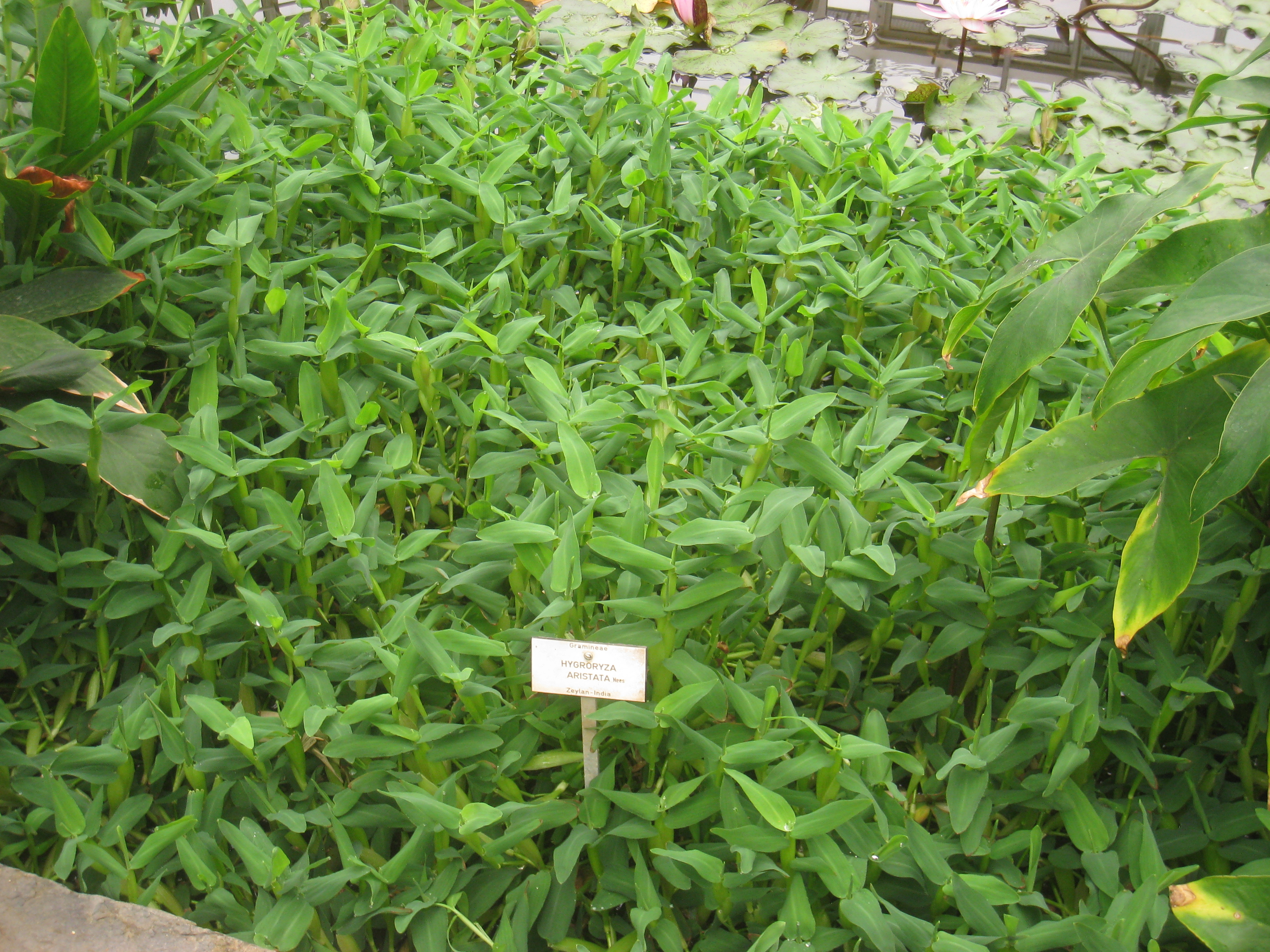

Scientific classification
- Kingdom: Plantae
- Clade: Tracheophytes
- Clade: Angiosperms
- Clade: Monocots
- Clade: Commelinids
- Order: Poales
- Family: Poaceae
- Subfamily: Oryzoideae
- Tribe: Oryzeae
- Subtribe: Zizaniinae
- Genus: Hygroryza; Nees
- Species: H. aristata

Binomial name
- Hygroryza aristata (Retz.) Nees ex Wight & Arn.

Synonyms
- Hygrorhiza Nees, alternate spelling; Potamochloa Griff.; Pharus aristatus Retz.; Leersia aristata (Retz.) Roxb.; Zizania retzii Spreng.; Zizania aristata (Retz.) Kunth; Potamochloa retzii Griff.; Potamochloa aristata (Roxb.) McClell.; Pharus natans Russell ex Steud.

= Hygroryza =

Genus of plants

Hygroryza (watergrass) is a monotyipic genus of Asian flowering plants in the grass family. The only known species is Hygroryza aristata, (Asian watergrass) native to China (Fujian, Guangdong, Hainan, Taiwan, Yunnan), Bangladesh, Cambodia, India (Maharashtra, Karnataka, Assam, etc.), Laos, Malaysia, Myanmar, Nepal, Pakistan, Sri Lanka, Thailand, Vietnam.

formerly included

Hygroryza ciliata - Leersia hexandra
