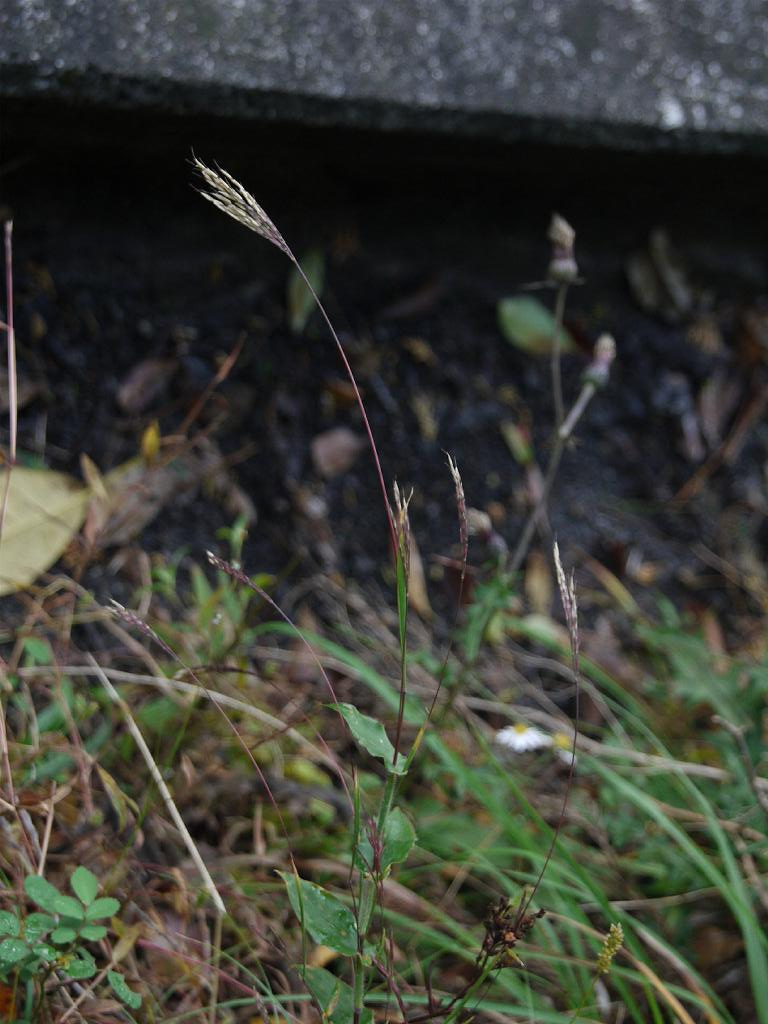
- Arthraxon hispidus

Scientific classification
- Kingdom: Plantae
- Clade: Tracheophytes
- Clade: Angiosperms
- Clade: Monocots
- Clade: Commelinids
- Order: Poales
- Family: Poaceae
- Subfamily: Panicoideae
- Supertribe: Andropogonodae
- Tribe: Andropogoneae
- Subtribe: Arthraxoninae; Benth.
- Genus: Arthraxon; P.Beauv., 1812

Type species
- Arthraxon ciliaris (syn of A. hispidus) P.Beauv.

Synonyms
- Pleuroplitis Trin.; Lucaea Kunth; Batratherum Nees; Lasiolytrum Steud.; Alectoridia A.Rich.; Barthantherum Andersson

= Arthraxon =

Genus of grasses

Arthraxon, commonly known as carpetgrass, is a genus of Asian, African and Australian plants in the grass family, Poaceae, containing the following species:

- Arthraxon antsirabensis – Madagascar
- Arthraxon castratus – Hainan, Indian Subcontinent, Indochina, Java
- Arthraxon cuspidatus – Ethiopia, Oman
- Arthraxon depressus – India
- Arthraxon echinatus – India, Nepal, Yunnan
- Arthraxon epectinatus – China, Himalayas
- Arthraxon hispidus – Asia, Africa, Australia, Indian Ocean islands
- Arthraxon inermis – India
- Arthraxon jubatus – Kerala
- Arthraxon junnarensis – Yunnan, India, Oman
- Arthraxon lanceolatus – eastern Africa, southern Asia
- Arthraxon lancifolius – Africa, southern Asia
- Arthraxon meeboldii – India
- Arthraxon microphyllus – Himalayas, Yunnan, Thailand
- Arthraxon multinervis – Guizhou
- Arthraxon nudus – southern Asia
- Arthraxon prionodes – eastern Africa, southern Asia
- Arthraxon raizadae – India
- Arthraxon santapaui – India, Himalayas
- Arthraxon submuticus – Himalayas, Yunnan
- Arthraxon typicus – Yunnan, Guangdong, Himalayas, Indochina, Java
- Arthraxon villosus – India

Several species now in the genera Dimeria and Microstegium were formerly included in Arthraxon:

- Arthraxon batangensis – Microstegium batangense
- Arthraxon hohenackeri – Dimeria hohenackeri
- Arthraxon lanceolatus and Arthraxon nodosus – Microstegium vimineum

== See also ==
- List of Poaceae genera
