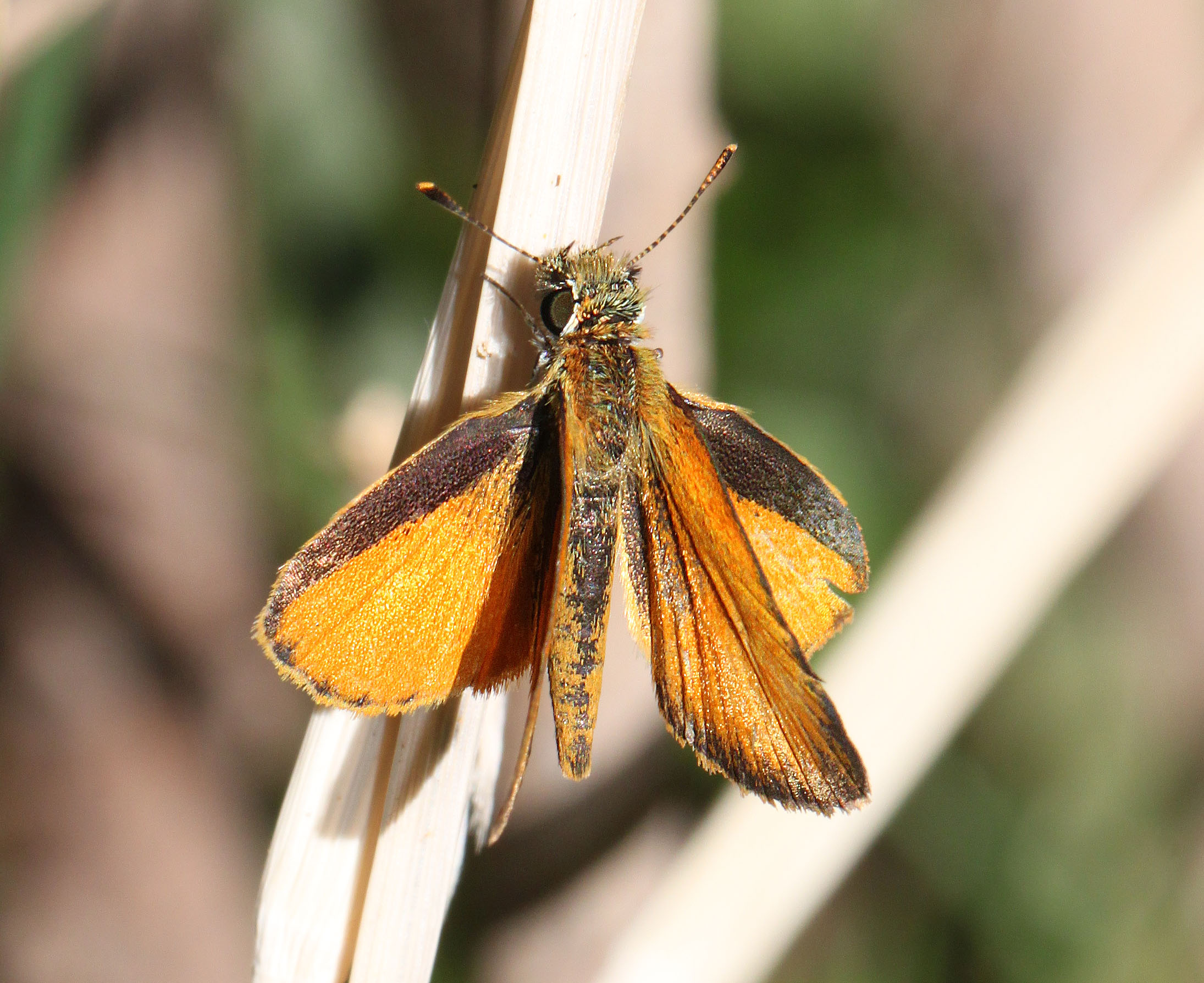

Conservation status
- Secure (NatureServe)

Scientific classification
- Kingdom: Animalia
- Phylum: Arthropoda
- Class: Insecta
- Order: Lepidoptera
- Family: Hesperiidae
- Genus: Ancyloxypha
- Species: A. arene

Binomial name
- Ancyloxypha arene (W. H. Edwards, 1871)

Synonyms
- Apaustus euphrasia Plötz, 1884; Apaustus isidorus (Plötz, 1884); Apaustus leporina Plötz, 1884; Copaeodes myrtis W. H. Edwards, 1882

= Ancyloxypha arene =

Species of butterfly

Ancyloxypha arene, the tropical least skipper, is a species of grass skipper in the butterfly family Hesperiidae. It is found in Central America and North America.

== Description ==
The wings are orange. The upperside of the wing has a narrow black border on both wings. The underside of the hindwing is golden orange with a pale ray running from the base through the cell to the outer margin. The wingspan ranges from 3/4 to 1 1/16 inches, or 1.9 to 2.7 centimeters.
