= Rice transitory yellowing virus =

Virus classification
- (unranked): Virus
- Realm: Riboviria
- Kingdom: Orthornavirae
- Phylum: Negarnaviricota
- Class: Monjiviricetes
- Order: Mononegavirales
- Family: Rhabdoviridae
- Genus: Alphanucleorhabdovirus
- Species: Rice yellow stunt alphanucleorhabdovirus

Synonyms
- Rice yellow stunt virus; Rice transitory yellowing virus

Species of virus

Rice transitory yellowing virus (RTYV) is a plant pathogenic virus of the family Rhabdoviridae.
