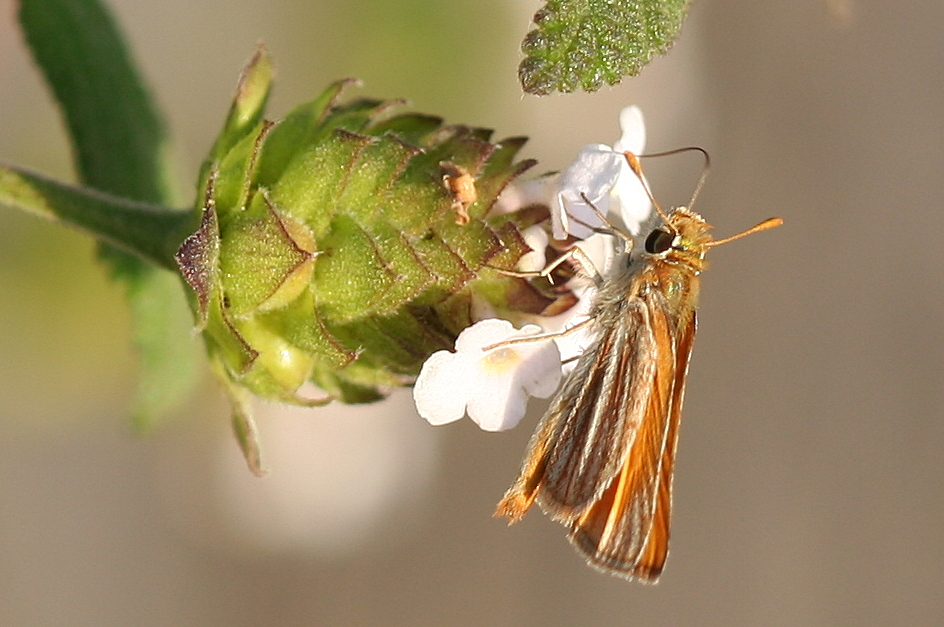

Conservation status
- Secure (NatureServe)

Scientific classification
- Kingdom: Animalia
- Phylum: Arthropoda
- Class: Insecta
- Order: Lepidoptera
- Family: Hesperiidae
- Genus: Copaeodes
- Species: C. minima

Binomial name
- Copaeodes minima (W.H. Edwards, 1870)

Synonyms
- Hesperia minima W.H. Edwards, 1870; Thymelicus singularis Plötz, 1884; Copaeodes rayata Barnes & McDunnough, 1913; Copaeodes minimus

= Copaeodes minima =

Southern skipperling

Species of butterfly

Copaeodes minima, the southern skipperling, is a butterfly of the family Hesperiidae. It is found in the United States from Arkansas east to North Carolina, south through Florida, the Gulf States, Texas, and Mexico to Panama.

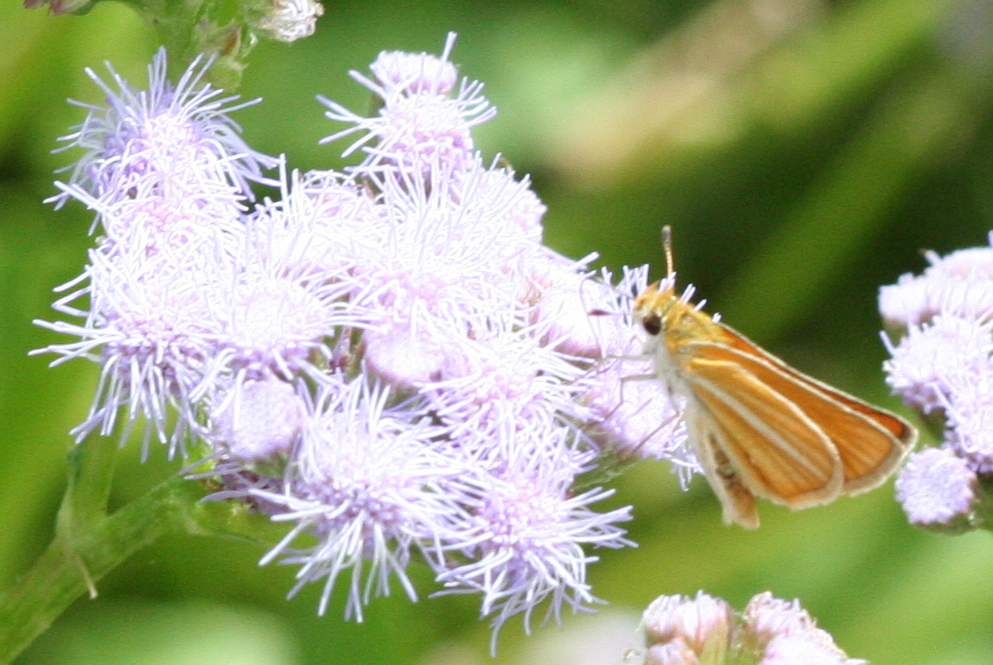

The wingspan is 16–22 mm. There are two generations with adults on wing from March to October in Louisiana. Adults are on wing year round in Florida.

The larvae feed on Cynodon dactylon. Adults feed on flower nectar from various flowers, including Helenium tenuifolium.
