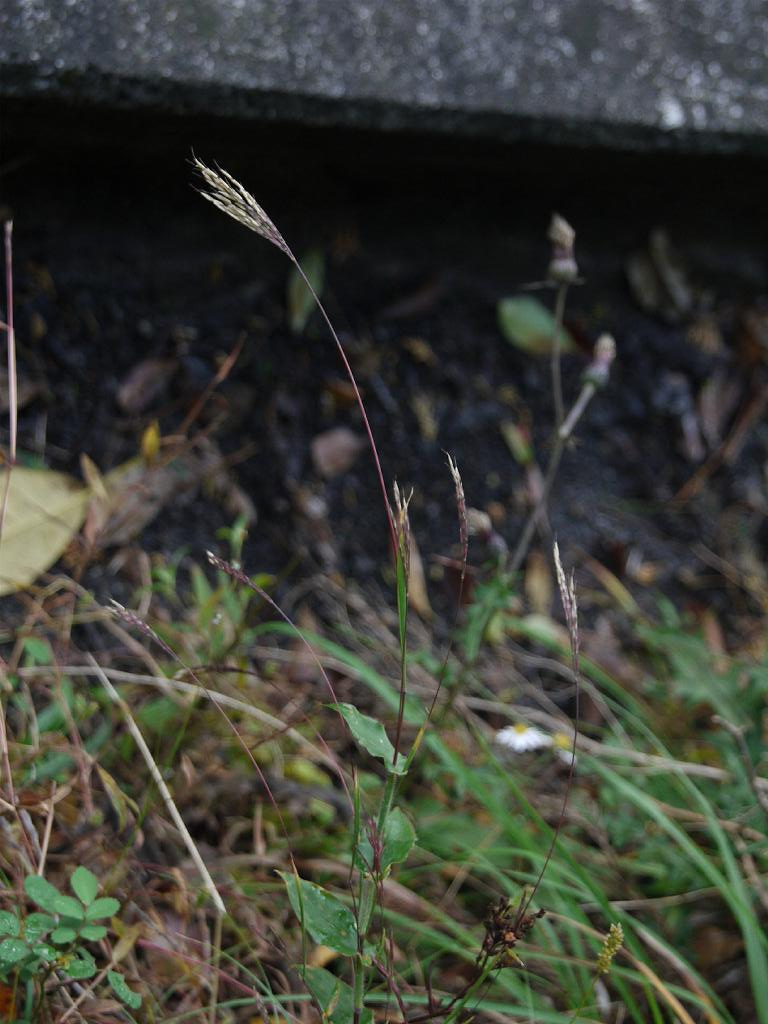

Scientific classification
- Kingdom: Plantae
- Clade: Tracheophytes
- Clade: Angiosperms
- Clade: Monocots
- Clade: Commelinids
- Order: Poales
- Family: Poaceae
- Subfamily: Panicoideae
- Genus: Arthraxon
- Species: A. hispidus

Binomial name
- Arthraxon hispidus (Thunb.) Makino

Synonyms
- Synonymy: Alectoridia quartiniana A.Rich.; Andropogon alectoridia Steud.; Andropogon amplexifolius Trin.; Andropogon ciliaris (P.Beauv.) Raspail; Andropogon lasiocoleus Steud.; Andropogon micans (Nees) Steud.; Andropogon plumbeus (Steud.) Hochst.; Andropogon violaceus B.Heyne ex Steud. [Invalid]; Arthraxon caucasicus (Rupr. ex Regel) Tzvelev; Arthraxon centrasiaticus (Griseb.) Gamajun.; Arthraxon ciliaris P.Beauv.; Arthraxon coloratus Hochst.; Arthraxon cryptatherus (Hack.) Koidz.; Arthraxon glabrescens Andersson ex Hack. [Invalid]; Arthraxon gracilis (Kunth) Hochst.; Arthraxon hookeri (Hack.) Henrard; Arthraxon japonicus Miq.; Arthraxon japonicum Miq.; Arthraxon kobuna Honda; Arthraxon langsdorffii (Trin.) Hochst.; Arthraxon langsdorfianus (Steud.) Hochst. [Illegitimate]; Arthraxon lasiocoleus (Steud.) Hochst.; Arthraxon major (Hochst. ex Steud.) Hochst.; Arthraxon mauritianus Stapf ex C.E.Hubb.; Arthraxon micans (Nees) Hochst.; Arthraxon okamotoi Ohwi; Arthraxon pallidus Henrard; Arthraxon pauciflorus Honda; Arthraxon plumbeus Hochst.; Arthraxon quartinianus (A.Rich.) Nash; Arthraxon violaceus (Steud.) Hochst.; Batratherum micans Nees; Batratherum plumbeum Munro ex Duthie [Invalid]; Chilochloa hispida (Thunb.) P.Beauv. [Invalid]; Deyeuxia japonica Spreng. [Illegitimate]; Digitaria hispida (Thunb.) Spreng.; Dimeria scrobiculata C.B.Clarke ex Koord.; Lasiolytrum hirtum Steud. [Invalid]; Lasiolytrum hispidum (Thunb.) Steud.; Leersia hispida (Thunb.) Thunb.; Lucaea gracilis Kunth; Lucaea langsdorffiana Steud. [Illegitimate]; Lucaea major Hochst. ex Steud.; Lucaea plumbea Steud.; Lucaea violacea Steud.; Lucaea vriesii Buse; Phalaris hispida Thunb.; Pleuroplitis caucasica (Regel) Rupr. ex Trautv.; Pleuroplitis centrasiatica Griseb.; Pleuroplitis langsdorffii Trin.; Pleuroplitis major (Steud.) Regel [Illegitimate]; Pleuroplitis plumbea Nees ex Arn.; Pleuroplitis quartiniana (A.Rich.) Regel; Pleuroplitis violacea Nees ex Hochst. [Invalid]; Pollinia ciliaris (P.Beauv.) Spreng.; Sorghum ciliare (P.Beauv.) Kuntze; Spodiopogon ciliaris (P.Beauv.) Nees ex Steud.; Arthraxon cuspidatus (Hochst. ex A. Rich.) Hochst.

= Arthraxon hispidus =

Species of grass

Arthraxon hispidus, is an annual grass commonly known as small carpetgrass, hairy jointgrass, joint-head grass, jointhead arthraxon, small carp grass, and creek grass. It is native to East Asia and Australia. It was accidentally introduced to the United States, Central America, and South America, where it is considered an invasive species.

== Description ==
Arthraxon hispidus is grass that is characterized by ovate or lanceolate shaped leaves with cordate bases that are 2.5-7.6 cm (1-3 in) long and 0.5-1.27 cm (0.2-0.5 in) wide. Its leaf stems and margins are hairy. It is 0.3-0.6 m (1-2 ft) tall with hairless, upright stems. It can spread by rooting at the nodes on its stem if they touch the ground and can spread easily this way. It fruits in caryopses, similar to other grain-like grasses, which may or may not contain awns depending on the subspecies. Its flowering and fruiting time is September through November. The upper glume is purple while the lower glume is green.

It may be confused for deertongue panicgrass (Dicanthelium clandestinum) or for Oplismenus aemulus. Arthraxon hispidus is distinguished from D. clandestinum due to its shorter height and leaves as well as the presence of marginal hairs. Arthraxon hispidus is distinguished from O. aemulus by its digitate and subdigitate inflorescence.

== Taxonomy ==
Arthraxon hispidus is highly variable, causing some researchers to consider there to be separate subspecies of the plant while others defend its single-species status. Current subspecies of A. hispidus are based on awn presence or absence.

Some researchers have justified the recognition of a single species (with no subspecies) by stating that proposed subspecies lack enough defining characteristics or geographical separation to be considered separate. They propose that the natural variation of Arthraxon hispidus can be explained by environmental differences across the species range.

== Distribution and habitat ==
Arthraxon hispidus grows in moist, sunny environments and can be found in riparian, wetland, or floodplain areas across Asia and Australia, specifically New South Wales and Queensland. The seeds of A. hispidus can be distributed and carried by water in its habitat.

The germination of A. hispidus is rapid (about three days) and with few limiting factors. It has proven to have high temperature (8-37 degrees Celsius) and pH (5-10) tolerance in germination. It is not known to germinate well in a wide range of salinity, with drought, or when buried more than 1-2 cm (0.4-0.8 in) deep.

Similar to other Australian fire-adapted plants, fire has been suggested to promote germination. Fire is not a necessary disturbance for A. hispidus to recruit in Australia, but it is believed that A. hispidus is resistant to variable weather patterns.

== Uses ==
In Asia, Arthraxon hispidus has a history of being used in traditional medicines as well as dyes.

In traditional medicine, it has been used to treat inflammatory diseases such as asthma. 7-methoxy-luteolin-8-C-β-6-deoxy-xylo-pyranos-3-uloside (mLU8C-PU) has been isolated from A. hispidus, which may be valuable in the treatment of tumor cells, as with other luteolins.

Arthraxon hispidus has been used in the production of a yellow silk cloth, kihachijo, which is associated with Hachijo Island and its kimonos. Identified dye components of the flavonoid C-glycosides include luteolin 8-C-rhamnoside, apigenin 8-C-rhamnoside, and tricin are responsible for the yellow color produced.

== Invasive status and management ==
In the United States, Arthraxon hispidus is considered an invasive weed. It was first discovered in the United States in Virginia in the 1930s and was thought to be introduced accidentally or possibly by immigrants from Asia. It now exists in at least 25 US states and is recognized as an invasive species by many of those states. As an invasive species, it is explicitly forbidden in Connecticut and New York.

Management of Arthraxon hispidus includes mowing, hand-weeding, or glyphosate-based herbicide application. It is recommended to begin management or control practices of A. hispidus before it produces seeds, due to its rapid germination.

In Australia, Arthraxon hispidus is considered a threatened species. There is uncertainty about the natural plant community of the species due to a long history of human development. It grows most successfully with other native New South Wales species and grows well in the region of Australia's northern coast.
