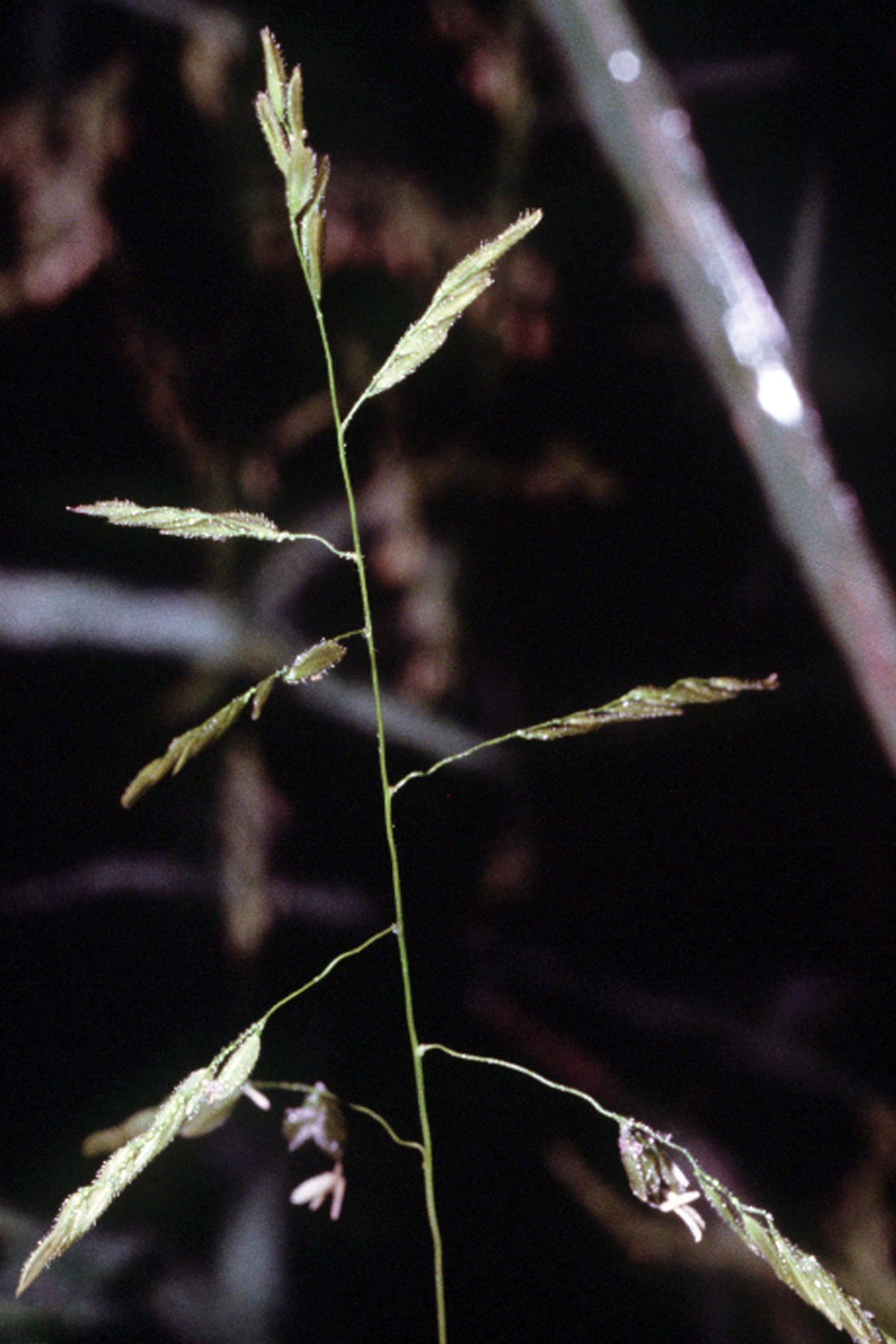

Scientific classification
- Kingdom: Plantae
- Clade: Tracheophytes
- Clade: Angiosperms
- Clade: Monocots
- Clade: Commelinids
- Order: Poales
- Family: Poaceae
- Genus: Leersia
- Species: L. oryzoides

Binomial name
- Leersia oryzoides (L.) Sw.

Synonyms
- Homalocenchrus oryzoides; Phalaris oryzoides

= Leersia oryzoides =

Species of plant

Leersia oryzoides is a species of grass known by the common name rice cutgrass or just cut-grass. It is a widespread grass native to Europe, Asia, and North America and present in many other regions, such as Australia, as an introduced species. This is a rhizomatous perennial grass growing to a maximum height between 1 and 1.5 meters. The leaves are up to about 28 centimeters long and have very rough, minutely toothed edges which are sharp enough to cut skin. The inflorescence is a loose, open array of wavy, hairlike branches bearing rows of spikelets. Each spikelet is a flat fruit with a rough, bristly lemma without an awn, and no glumes. Some of the spikelet branches develop within the sheaths of the leaves and are cleistogamous. This grass is sometimes used for erosion control and restoring wetlands.
