= South Asian Stone Age =

Palaeolithic, Mesolithic and Neolithic periods in South Asia

The South Asian Stone Age spans the prehistoric age from the earliest use of stone tools in the Paleolithic period to the rise of agriculture, domestication, and pottery in the Neolithic period across present-day India, Pakistan, Bangladesh, Nepal, Bhutan, and Sri Lanka. As in other parts of the world, in South Asia, the divisions of the Stone Age into the Paleolithic, Mesolithic, and Neolithic periods do not carry precise chronological boundaries; instead, they describe broad phases of technological and cultural development based on the tools and artifacts found at various archaeological sites.

The Paleolithic (Old Stone Age) in South Asia began as early as 2.6 million years ago (Ma) based on the earliest known sites with hominin activity, namely the Siwalik Hills of northwestern India. The Mesolithic (Middle Stone Age) is defined as a transitional phase following the end of the Last Glacial Period, beginning around 10000 BCE. The Neolithic (New Stone Age), starting around 7000 BCE, is associated with the emergence of agriculture and other hallmarks of settled life or sedentism, as opposed to hunter-gatherer lifestyles. The earliest reliably-dated South Asian neolithic site is Mehrgarh in present-day Pakistan dated to 6500 BCE.

== Paleolithic ==
The Paleolithic in South Asia is also traditionally divided into the Lower, Middle, and Upper Paleolithic periods. The Paleolithic falls within the larger geologic Pleistocene Epoch, spanning from about 2.58 million years ago (Ma) to 11,700 years ago (Ka). As such, the terms Early Pleistocene and Middle Pleistocene are often applied as overlapping geological timeframes in discussions about the Paleolithic.

=== Lower Paleolithic ===
The Lower Paleolithic period in South Asia represents the earliest phase of known hominin activity in the region and corresponds chronologically with the Early Pleistocene. This archeological record, spanning 2.6 Ma -2.5 Ma to approximately 300 Ka, is marked by evidence of lithic technology, including those characterized as the Acheulean industry, (which are often attributed to early hominids such as Homo erectus), the Soanian industry, named after the Soan River, a tributary of the Indus, and also includes distinct Pre-Acheulean lithic assemblages.

==== Siwalik Hills (Pre-Acheulean) ====
The Masol site, located in the Siwalik Frontal Range north of Chandigarh, India, was surveyed between 2009 and 2011 by an Indo-French research program led by Yves Coppens, the College of France and Academy of Sciences and the French Ministry of Foreign Affairs.

The site yielded over 1,469 fossils within a stratigraphic layer confirmed by paleomagnetic dating to 2.6 Ma, including 45 fossils with green fractures, 12 with carnivore traces, and 3 with cut marks, found on a tibia shaft from a large herbivore, a bovid shaft, and a rib from a Stegodon (Stegadon insignis). Although critics have attributed similar types of bone markings elsewhere to large predators or trampling, in this case, researchers concluded the "anthropic origin can be in no doubt" based on several lines of evidence. Foremost, the markings closely matched experimental cut marks made by quartzite edges. Furthermore, the taphonomic analysis of the Masol site does not suggest dispersal by a natural disaster nor does it provide evidence for animal predation on such large prey. Finally, statistically, researchers noted a relatively high frequency of sharp cut marks—3 out of 1,469 fossils, compared to sites like Java, Indonesia, where only 5 bones out of 30,000 showed similar marks in a locale with substantial fossil evidence of a Homo erectus.

Evidence of anthropic cut marks on fossilized bone in the Himalayan foothills (2.6 Ma) positions South Asia closer to the center of hominin evolution than ever before, suggesting the region was witness to early scavenging behaviors, similar to those observed at sites like Dikika, Ethiopia (3.4 Ma) and Lomekwi, Kenya (3.2 Ma), both earlier and further from Africa than previously considered.

==== Pothohar Plateau (Pre-Acheulean) ====
While the Masol site provides evidence of quartzite cut marks, other sites in the region reveal evidence of stone tools capable of producing such cut marks. Riwat, located in the Pothohar Plateau, in Pakistan is one of the earliest sites containing Pre-Acheulean stone tools dated to around 2.5 Ma. Similarly, the Pabbi Hills in Northern Pakistan have produced stone tools dated to 2.2 to 0.9 Ma. The stone tools found at these sites, including light and heavy-duty tools like simple end-choppers, represent a distinct, older lithic technology separate from the Acheulean and Soanian traditions.

==== Earliest Acheulean sites ====
The Attirampakkam site, located near Chennai, was first identified by the British geologist Robert Bruce Foote in the 1860s. It has produced some of the oldest known Acheulean tools in not just South Asia, but the entire world, indicating that hominins inhabiting the Indian subcontinent were already familiar with bifacial tools, handaxes and cleavers approximately 1.5 Ma. This dating, confirmed by both paleomagnetic and ^{26}Al/^{10}Be burial dating, means that India's oldest Acheulean tools were contemporary to those in Africa and Central Asia and thus challenges the traditional view of Acheulean colonization, suggesting either an earlier spread or independent development of these lithic technologies across several continents.

Isampur in Karnataka, India, is one of the about 200 Lower Paleolithic Acheulian sites in the Hunasagi and Baichbal valleys, and is dated to about 1.27 Ma. Although older assemblages have been found in Attirampakkam and Bori, Maharashtra (1.4 Ma), Isampur is a unique archeological site in that it is a quarry - a site of lithic manufacturing where over 15,000 artifacts have been uncovered. The site has provided insights into a full spectrum of early hominin tool-making, from selecting limestone slabs and removing large flakes to shaping tools into bifaces such as handaxes and cleavers using secondary flaking.

==== Acheulean Assemblages and Homo erectus in South Asia ====
The presence of Homo erectus in South Asia is largely inferred on the basis of lithic assemblages within the appropriate temporal range of the species duration and commonly, via the association between Acheulian tools and Homo erectus, which has been established at other global sites including in other parts of Asia.

Acheulean assemblages have been widespread across South Asia, including the Kortallayar Valley in Tamil Nadu, Hunsgi-Baichbal Valleys in Karnataka (e.g. Isampur), Chirki-Nevasa in Maharashtra, Didwana in Rajasthan, Bhimbetka's rock shelters and its surrounding open-air sites in the Vindhya hills of Madhya Pradesh. These discoveries indicate that Acheulean technology was not confined to a single area but was widespread across the Indian subcontinent, suggesting that associated early hominins like Homo erectus had a broad geographical distribution throughout the region.

=== Middle Paleolithic ===
The Middle Paleolithic in South Asia is marked by the emergence of flake-based technologies that suggest more advanced planning as well as signs of early symbolic behavior. These findings may represent the work of early anatomically modern humans.

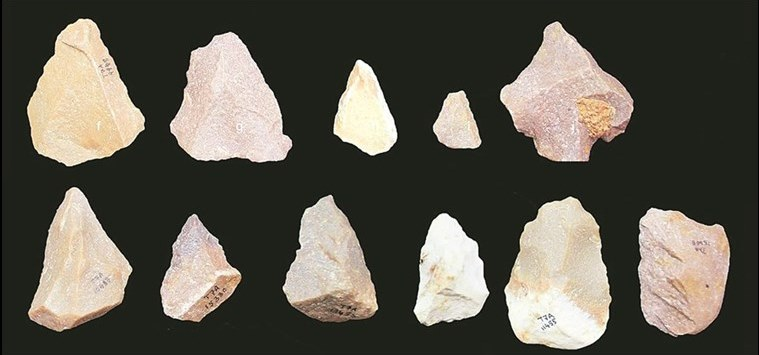
Stone tools discovered at the prehistoric site of Attirampakkam in South India are among the earliest examples of Levallois technique outside of Africa.

The transition to the Middle Paleolithic in South Asia has been uniquely informed by Attirampakkam, an open-air site with evidence of lithic industry spanning over a millennium. This quarry site has preserved not only the earliest Acheulean assemblages in South Asia (1.5 Ma), but also the earliest Middle Paleolithic assemblages, dated to 385 Ka.

The discovery of over 7,000 artifacts, bearing evidence of the Levallois technique at Attirampakkam, was published in Nature in 2018 by a research team led by Shanti Pappu, which challenges some long-held assumptions about the Out of Africa migration theory. Levallois tools have been traditionally associated with Neanderthals and early Homo sapiens, however the Attirampakkam findings are dated to 385 Ka, making them not only the earliest examples of this technology outside of Africa, but archaeologically contemporaneous to the earliest known African Levallois point, dated to 400 Ka, in East Africa's Kapthurin Formation. This far predates the previous figure of 130 Ka for when modern humans were thought to have migrated from Africa into Eurasia.

The larger implications of the findings remain open to debate. Shanti Pappu, a lead author on the 2018 Nature article, has been careful not to attribute the tools to any particular hominin species, but speculates that the tools could indicate an earlier arrival of Homo sapiens to India, which would support a more complex non-linear migration pattern out of Africa. Paleoanthropologist John Hawks, also not involved in the study, commented that the Attirampakkam data dismantle previous notions that modern humans spread from Africa due to a significant technological superiority over archaic, less intelligent human species. Independent pre-publication peer reviewer, Michael Petraglia described the discovery as a "marvellous" contribution to understanding human history in South Asia, noting that it fills knowledge gap from 400 Ka to 175 Ka. Petraglia considers these artifacts as evidence of an independent advancement made by early humans in Attirampakkam:

"Rather than equating technologies from Europe to Africa to South Asia, you can also recast it as independent invention by large-brained early humans."

Whether the Attirampakkam Levallois tools were made by early modern humans living in India long before the accepted migration out of Africa or by earlier hominin species such as Homo heidelbergensis remains unresolved in the absence of DNA or fossil evidence.

==== Narmada Valley ====
The Narmada Valley of central India has revealed evidence of two distinct hominin populations during the middle to early late Pleistocene (250 Ka to 70 Ka). Fossils uncovered by anthropologist Anek Sankhyan include robust but unusually short clavicles, which point to a previously unknown "short-stocky" hominin, coexisting with a larger-bodied, so-called "Acheulian Man".

==== Early Hominins of Deccan Plateau ====
Further inland from Attirampakkam, on the Deccan Plateau in present-day Andhra Pradesh, the sites of Jwalapuram and the Kurnool Caves offer insights on early hominins in South India.

At Jwalapuram, artifacts have been found both beneath and above volcanic ash from the Toba supereruption which occurred around 74 Ka in India and ranks as one of the largest volcanic events in the past two million years. The presence of Middle Paleolithic tools in both layers suggests that hominins survived this major environmental event and continued to inhabit the area, exhibiting cultural continuity. This resilience in the face of extreme climatic stress hints at sophisticated survival strategies.

Detailed examination of these tool assemblages reveals notable similarities to Middle Paleolithic technologies found in Africa, rather than those associated with the Levantine. This resemblance has led researchers to propose that Homo sapiens may have been responsible for creating these artifacts. Additionally, the timing of these assemblages aligns with genetic estimates for early human migrations out of Africa, providing further support for the idea that modern humans may have been present in southern India around this time.

== Homo sapiens ==
Analysis of mitochondrial DNA dates the immigration of Homo sapiens into the subcontinent to 75,000 to 50,000 years ago. Cave sites in Sri Lanka have yielded non-mitochondrial record of Homo sapiens in South Asia, dated to 34,000 years ago.(Kennedy 2000: 180) Microlithic assemblages at the sites of Mahadebbera and Kana, West Bengal, India, have been dated to between 42,000 and 25,000 years ago using Optically Stimulated Luminescence, indicating an earlier presence of homo sapiens, and more specifically, microlithic technology, in South Asia than previously documented. For finds from the Belan in southern Uttar Pradesh, India radiocarbon data have indicated an age of 18,000-17,000 years.

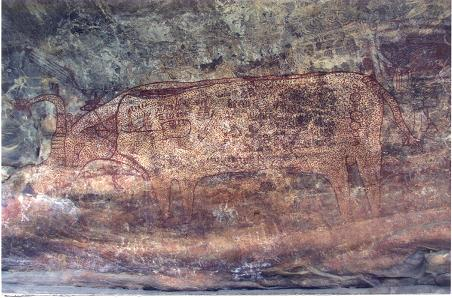
Bhimbetka rock painting, Madhya Pradesh, India

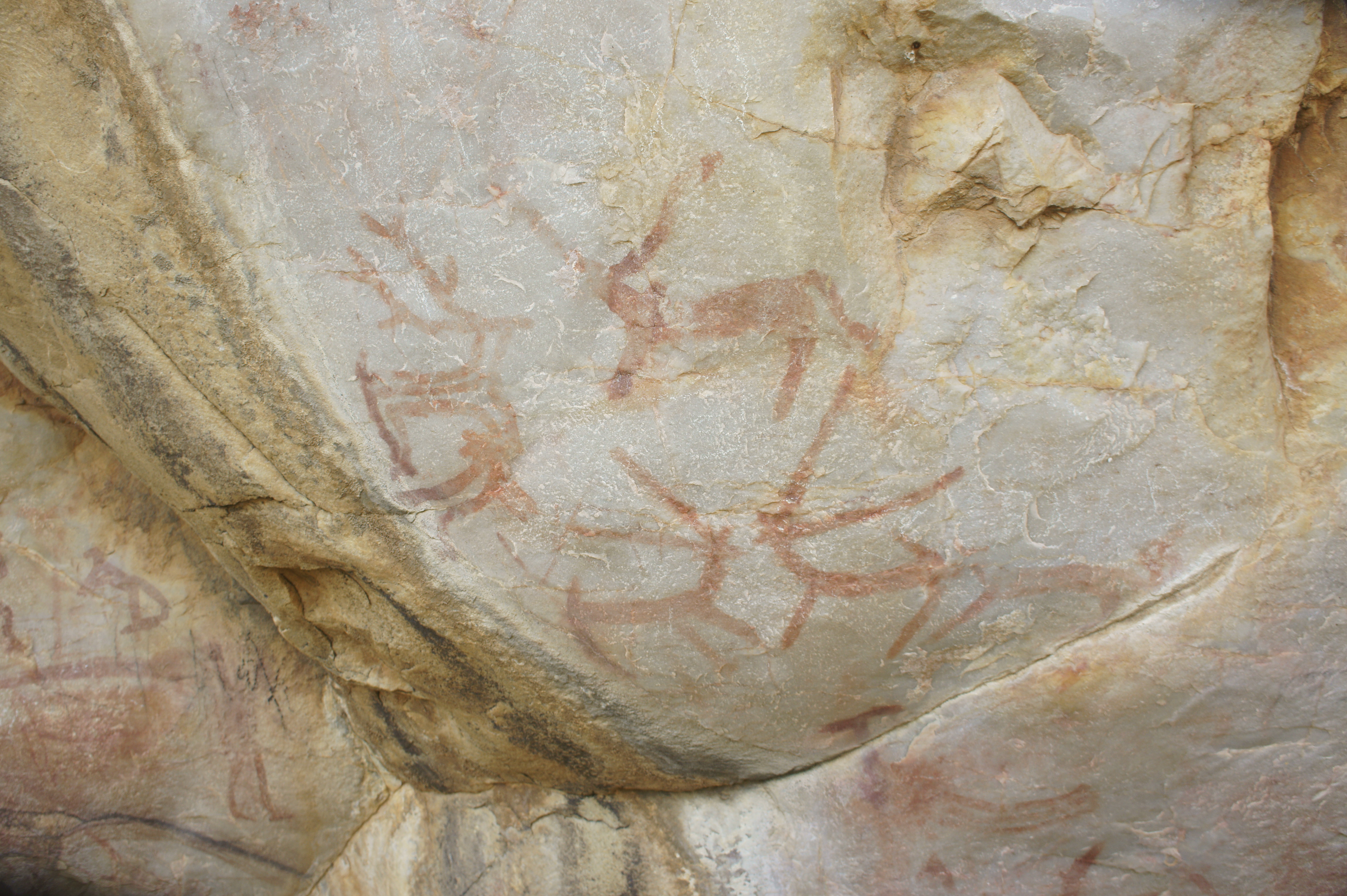
Ketavaram rock paintings, Kurnool district, Andhra Pradesh (6000 BCE)

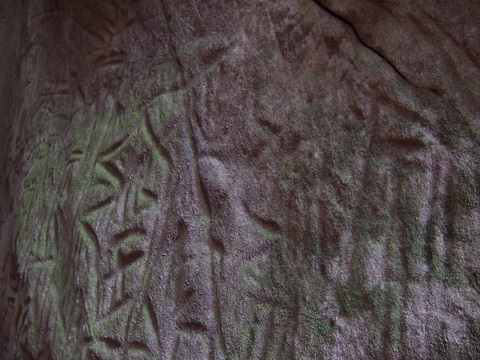
Stone Age writing of Edakkal Caves in Kerala, India (6,000 BCE)

At the rock shelters of Bhimbetka there are cave paintings dating to c. 30,000 BCE, and there are small cup like depressions at the end of the Auditorium Rock Shelter, which is dated to nearly 100,000 years; the Sivaliks and the Potwar (Pakistan) region also exhibit many vertebrate fossil remains and paleolithic tools. Chert, jasper and quartzite were often used by humans during this period.

== Neolithic ==
The earliest reliably-dated Neolithic site in South Asia is Mehrgarh in the Kacchi Plain of present-day Pakistan dating from 7000 BCE, where the early farmers used domesticated crops such as wheat and barley and domesticated animals such as sheep, goats and cattle, and settled in houses of mud-bricks. In northern South Asia the aceramic Neolithic (Mehrgarh I, Baluchistan, Pakistan, also dubbed "Early Food Producing Era") lasts c. 7000 - 5500 BCE. The ceramic Neolithic lasts up to 3300 BCE, blending into the Early Harappan (Chalcolithic to Early Bronze Age) period. Recently another site along the ancient Ghaggar-Hakra River system in the present day state of Haryana in India called Bhirrana has been discovered yielding a dating of around 7600 BCE for its earliest levels — however, this dating has been questioned as the cultural remains are of a more developed Chalcolithic-stage using 4th millennium BCE ceramics.

In the Ganges Plain, the unambiguous emergence of Neolithic sites, marked by evidence of rice cultivation dates to after mid-3rd millennium BCE, and mainly after 2000 BCE, with earlier "possible origins" in 4th millennium BCE. Earlier datings of 7th millennium BCE — including Lahuradewa in the Middle Ganges region and Jhusi near the confluence of Ganges and Yamuna rivers, and Koldihwa, in present-day Uttar Pradesh, India, with domesticated rice — have been called into question. It is disputed whether the earliest rice grains found at Lahuradewa were domesticated or collected from wild rice; and furthermore, the animal remains from the early levels were wild, not domesticated — suggesting that the site initially had only "intermittent" occupation by hunter-gatherers, and it probably was not until the 3rd millennium BCE when settlement became "more regular" with unambiguous evidence of farming. Four other carbon dates (out of five) from the earliest period of occupation at Lahuradewa were in the range of 4220 to 2879 BCE, and the same archaeological levels also contained "steatite beads of the Harappan type" (i.e., appearing during 4th millennium BCE). Early carbon datings from Koldihwa have also been disputed, as the site has "dates mainly of much later period (i.e. from the Second Millennium BC), and artifact assemblages consistent with the younger dates": Fresh re-examination and re-dating of Koldihwa has indicated that the site has "clear stratified occupation from the later Neolithic, starting after ca. 1900 BC". Dorian Fuller — an archaeobotanist — has stated that: "Caution is warranted in considering early/mid-Holocene radiocarbon dates reported from this region" (i.e., Ganges Plains), as earliest datings "would appear to be residual within their archaeological contexts, or represent very old wood".

In South India the Neolithic began after 3000 BCE and lasted until around 1000 BCE. South Indian Neolithic is characterized by Ashmounds since 2500 BCE in the Andhra-Karnataka region that expanded later into Tamil Nadu. Comparative excavations carried out in Adichanallur in the Thirunelveli District and in Northern India have provided evidence of a southward migration of the Megalithic culture. The earliest clear evidence of the presence of the megalithic urn burials are those dating from around 1000 BCE, which have been discovered at various places in Tamil Nadu, notably at Adichanallur, 24 kilometers from Tirunelveli, where archaeologists from the Archaeological Survey of India unearthed 12 urns containing human skulls, skeletons and bones, husks, grains of charred rice and Neolithic celts, confirming the presence of the Neolithic period 2800 years ago. Archaeologists have made plans to return to Adhichanallur as a source of new knowledge in the future.

== See also ==
- History of Afghanistan
- History of Bangladesh
- History of Bhutan
- History of India
- History of Maldives
- History of Nepal
- History of Pakistan
- History of Sri Lanka
- Prehistoric Asia
