= Lahuradewa =

Archaeological site in Uttar Pradesh, India

Location of Lahuradewa site

Lahuradewa (Lat. 26°46'12" N; Long. 82°56'59" E) is located in Sant Kabir Nagar District, in Sarayupar (Trans-Sarayu) region of the Upper Gangetic Plain in Uttar Pradesh state of India. The Sarayupar Plain is bounded by the Sarayu river in the west and south, Nepalese Terai in the north, and the Gandak River in the east.

The site is noted to have been occupied as early as 9,000 BCE, it provides the oldest evidence of ceramics in Indian Subcontinent. This pottery belong to 'Mesolithic' ceramic tradition that developed among Vindhya and Ganga region hunter-gatherers during the Mesolithic period.

Excavations reported earliest archaeological sites in the world for cultivation of rice, with Lahuradewa Period IA giving samples that were dated by AMS radiocarbon to the 7th millennium BCE. However, it is still debated whether the early rice grains were cultivated/domesticated or in fact simply gathered from wild rice.

In addition, the claims of such early dating of rice cultivation at Lahuradewa have been questioned by historian Irfan Habib, who writes: "both the cultivated rice grain and its early date remain dubious, given the other evidence from the site". Habib has noted that four other carbon dates (out of five) from the earliest period of occupation at Lahuradewa were in the range of 4220 to 2879 BCE, and that the same archaeological levels also contained "steatite beads of the Harappan type!", i.e., demonstrating that Lahuradewa since the beginning had trade contacts with the Indus Valley Civilisation (which arose during 4th millennium BCE).

Other archaeological sites of Northern India where rice grains were found are considered as showing evidence of domesticated rice cultivation by ca. 2000 BCE, whereas other rice grains dated during ca. 4800 to 3500 BCE are considered as wild or uncertain whether wild/domesticated.

Dorian Fuller — an archaeobotanist — has argued that the earliest rice from Lahuradewa was "more suggestive of wild rice collecting," and the fauna reported from early levels was entirely wild, not domesticated, suggesting that this site initially had only "intermittent" occupation by hunter-gatherers, and it probably was not until the 3rd millennium BCE when settlement became "more regular" with unambiguous evidence of farming. Fuller also mentions that for some other sites (such as Koldihwa) in the Ganges Plain region, where earlier reported dates for early Neolithic were as old as the 6th millennium BCE, were more recently re-examined and re-dated, showing that they "have clear stratified occupation from the later Neolithic, starting after ca. 1900 BC", which is more consistent with the known material culture and "can be linked by ceramic styles and other dating evidence to a number of other sites in the region". Fuller notes that: "Caution is warranted in considering early/mid-Holocene radiocarbon dates reported from this region [i.e., Ganges Plains]" which "dates would appear to be residual within their archaeological contexts, or represent very old wood", and has concluded: "The unambiguous evidence for sedentary, agricultural villages after mid-third millennium and mainly after 2000 BC, as well as ceramic links, suggests that the Neolithic mainly of the later third millennium/early second millennium with possible origins in the earlier fourth millennium".

== See also ==
- Chopani Mando
