= History of rice cultivation =

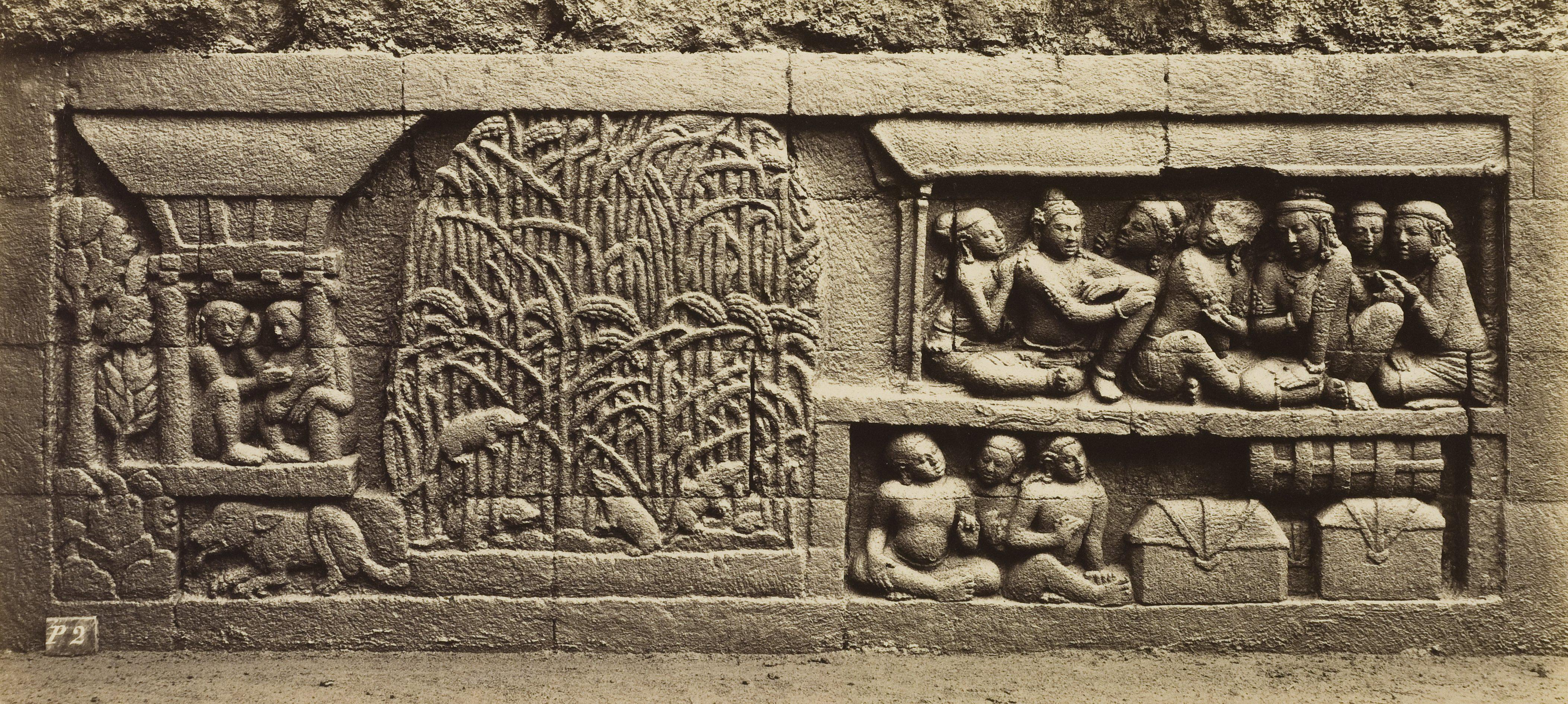
Bas-relief at Karmawibhanga Museum in Central Java of 9th century Borobudur describes rice barn and rice plants being infested by mouse pestilence. Rice farming has a long history in Indonesia.

The history of rice cultivation is an interdisciplinary subject that studies archaeological and documentary evidence to explain how rice was first domesticated and cultivated by humans, the spread of cultivation to different regions of the planet, and the technological changes that have impacted cultivation over time.

The current scientific consensus, based on archaeological and linguistic evidence, is that Oryza sativa rice was first domesticated in the Yangtze River basin in China 9,000 years ago. Cultivation, migration and trade spread rice around the world—first to much of East Asia, and then further abroad, and eventually to the Americas as part of the Columbian exchange.

The now less common Oryza glaberrima rice, also known as African Rice, was independently domesticated in Africa around 3,000 years ago. O. glaberrima spread to the Americas through the transatlantic slave trade although how is not clear. It is still commonly grown in West Africa and is grown in a number of countries in the Americas. There are also several crosses of O. glaberrima and O. sativa.

Four species of rice that form the genus Zizania, commonly known as wild rice are native to and cultivated in North America, where the grain is used, as well as in China, where the plant's stem is used as a vegetable. Wild rice and domesticated rice (Oryza sativa and Oryza glaberrima) belong to the same botanical tribe, Oryzeae. Wild rice is also cultivated in Hungary and Australia.

Since its spread, rice has become a global staple crop important to food security and food cultures around the world. Local varieties of Oryza sativa have resulted in over 40,000 cultivars of various types. More recent changes in agricultural practices and breeding methods as part of the Green Revolution and other transfers of agricultural technologies has led to increased production in recent decades.

== History ==
=== China ===
Map of the Neolithic China (8500 to 1500 BC), showing the approximate locations of the Hemudu, Majiabang, and Liangzhu cultures (associated with pre-Austronesians); and the Pengtoushan, Daxi, and Qujialing cultures (associated with the Hmong–Mien speakers), along the Lower and Upper Yangtze basin

The scientific consensus based on archaeological and linguistic evidence, is that rice was first domesticated in the Yangtze River basin in China. Because the functional allele for nonshattering, the critical indicator of domestication in grains, as well as five other single-nucleotide polymorphisms, is identical in both indica and japonica, Vaughan et al. (2008) determined a single domestication event for O. sativa. This was supported by a genetic study in 2011 that showed that all forms of Asian rice, both indica and japonica, sprang from a single domestication event that occurred some 9,000 years ago in China from the wild rice Oryza rufipogon. A more recent population genomic study indicates that japonica was domesticated first, and that indica rice arose when japonica arrived in India about ~4,500 years ago and hybridized with an undomesticated proto-indica or wild O. nivara.

There are two most likely centers of domestication for rice as well as the development of the wetland agriculture technology. The first is in the lower Yangtze River, believed to be the homelands of the pre-Austronesians and possibly also the Kra–Dai, and associated with the Kauhuqiao, Hemudu, Majiabang, Songze, Liangzhu, and Maqiao cultures. It is characterized by pre-Austronesian features, including stilt houses, jade carving, and boat technologies.

The second is in the middle Yangtze River, believed to be the homelands of the early Hmong–Mien speakers and associated with the Pengtoushan, Nanmuyuan, Liulinxi, Daxi, Qujialing, and Shijiahe cultures. Both of these regions were heavily populated and had regular trade contacts with each other, as well as with early Austroasiatic speakers to the west, and early Kra–Dai speakers to the south, facilitating the spread of rice cultivation throughout southern China.

Rice was gradually introduced north into the early Sino-Tibetan Yangshao and Dawenkou culture millet farmers, either via contact with the Daxi culture or the Majiabang-Hemudu culture. By around 4000 to 3800 BC, they were a regular secondary crop among southernmost Sino-Tibetan cultures. It did not replace millet, largely because of different environment conditions in northern China, but it was cultivated alongside millet in the southern boundaries of the millet-farming regions. Conversely, millet was also introduced into rice-farming regions.

By the late Neolithic (3500 to 2500 BC), population in the rice cultivating centers had increased rapidly, centered around the Qujialing-Shijiahe culture and the Liangzhu culture. There was also evidence of intensive rice cultivation in paddy fields as well as increasingly sophisticated material cultures in these two regions. Both the number of settlements and overall settlement sizes increased among the Yangtze cultures, leading some archeologists to characterize them as true states, with clearly advanced socio-political structures. However, it is unknown if they had centralized control.

Liangzhu and Shijiahe declined abruptly in the terminal Neolithic (2500 to 2000 BC). With Shijiahe shrinking in size, and Liangzhu disappearing altogether. This is largely believed to be the result of the southward expansion of the early Sino-Tibetan Longshan culture. Fortifications like walls (as well as extensive moats in Liangzhu cities) are common features in settlements during this period, indicating widespread conflict. This period also coincides with the southward movement of rice-farming cultures to the Lingnan and Fujian regions, as well as the southward migrations of the Austronesian, Kra–Dai, and Austroasiatic-speaking peoples to Mainland Southeast Asia and Island Southeast Asia. A genomic study also indicates that at around this time, a global cooling event (the 4.2 k event) led to tropical japonica rice being pushed southwards, as well as the evolution of temperate japonica rice that could grow in more northern latitudes.

Genomic studies suggests that indica rice was later introduced back to China from India between 2,000 and 1,400 years ago.

=== Southeast Asia ===
The spread of japonica rice cultivation to Southeast Asia started with the migrations of the Austronesian Dapenkeng culture into Taiwan between 3500 and 2000 BC (5,500 BP to 4,000 BP). The Nanguanli site in Taiwan, dated to ca. 2800 BC, has yielded numerous carbonized remains of both rice and millet in waterlogged conditions, indicating intensive wetland rice cultivation and dryland millet cultivation. A multidisciplinary study using rice genome sequences indicate that tropical japonica rice was pushed southwards from China after a global cooling event (the 4.2-kiloyear event) that occurred approximately 4,200 years ago.

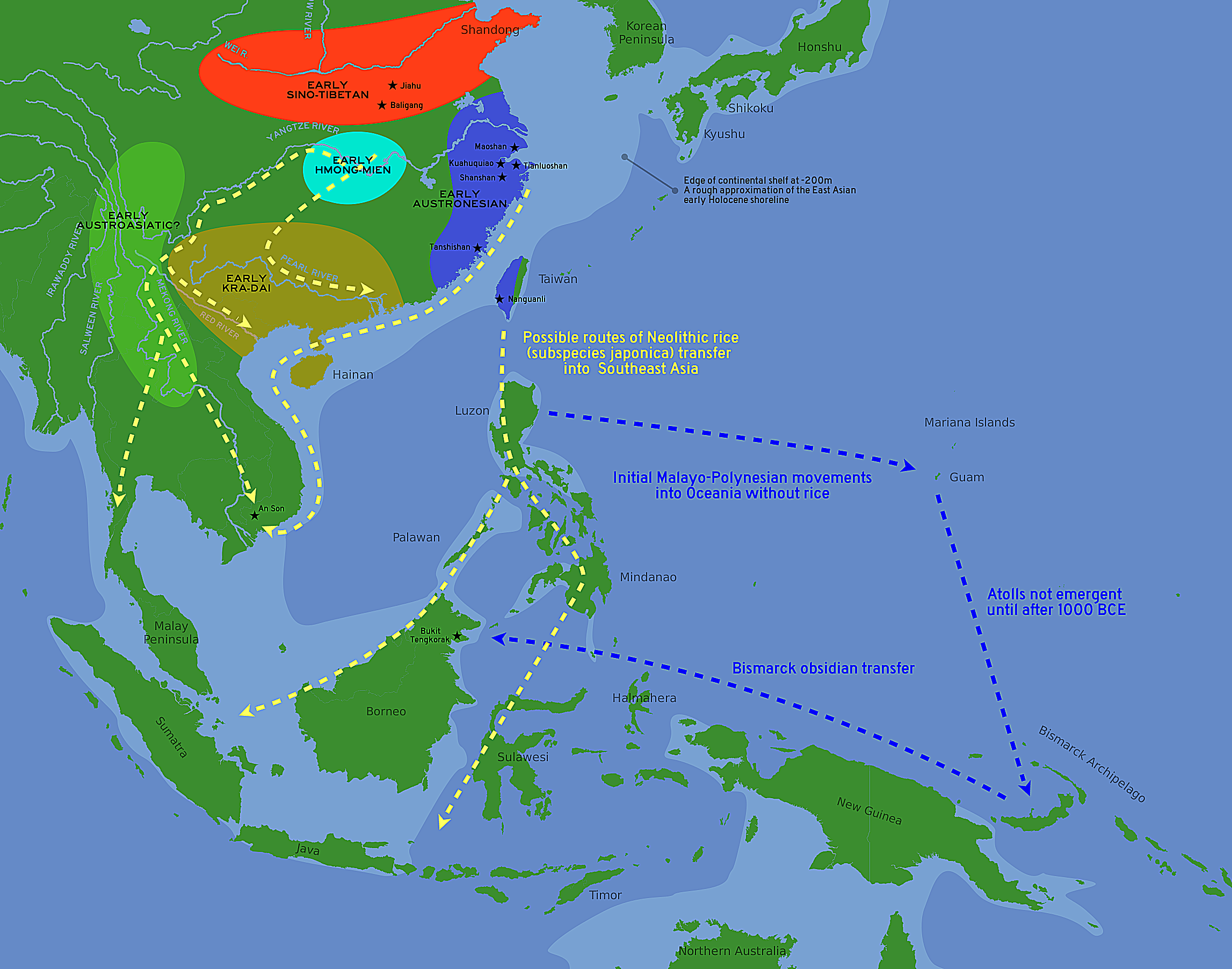
Possible language family homelands, and likely routes of early rice transfer (ca. 3500 to 500 BC). The approximate coastlines during the early Holocene are shown in lighter blue. (Bellwood, 2011)

From about 2000 to 1500 BC, the Austronesian expansion began, with settlers from Taiwan moving south to colonize Luzon in the Philippines, bringing rice cultivation technologies with them. From Luzon, Austronesians rapidly colonized the rest of Island Southeast Asia, moving westwards to Borneo, the Malay Peninsula and Sumatra; and southwards to Sulawesi and Java. By 500 BC, there is evidence of intensive wetland rice agriculture already established in Java and Bali, especially near very fertile volcanic islands.

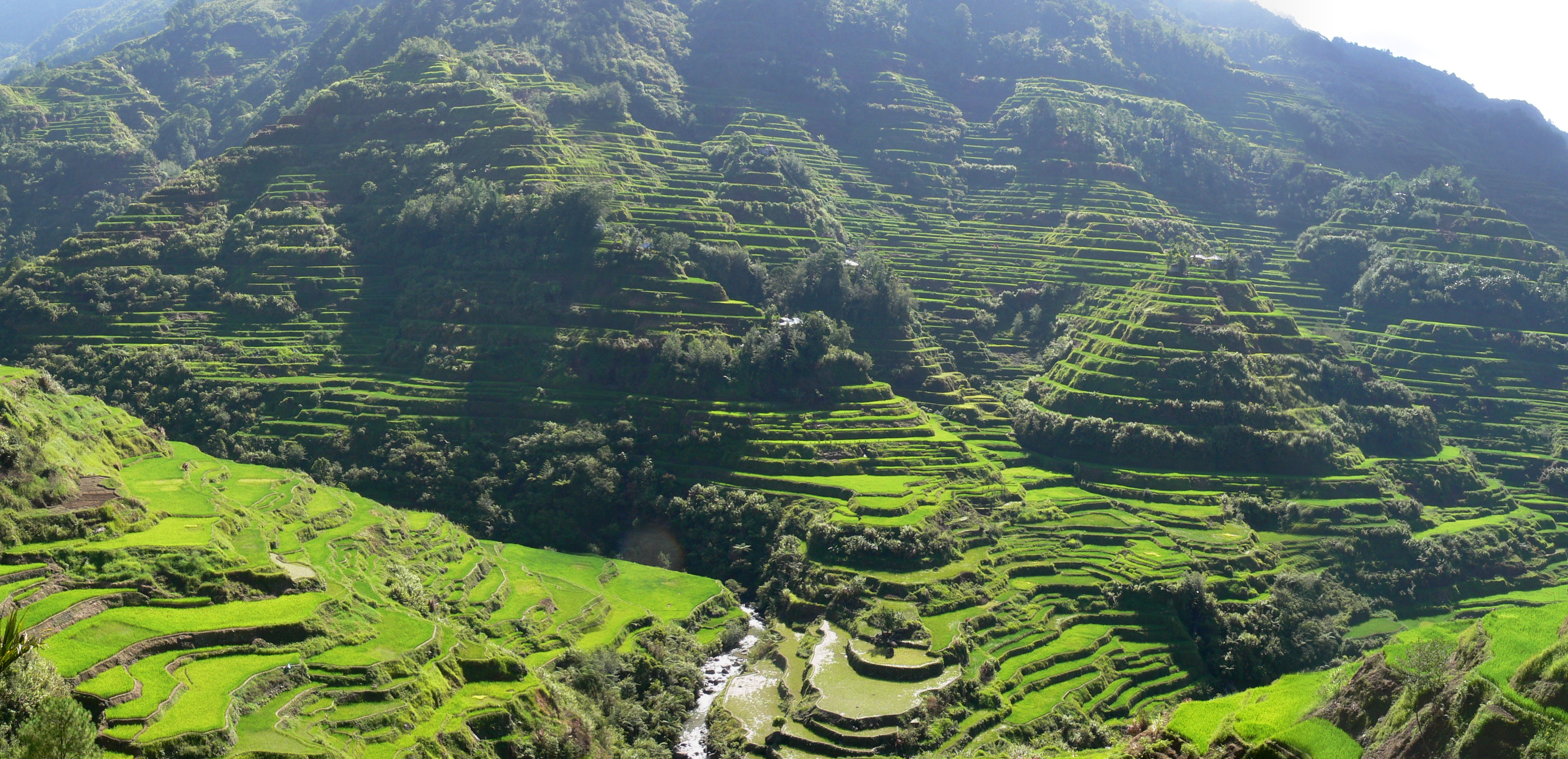
Banaue Rice Terraces in Luzon, Philippines

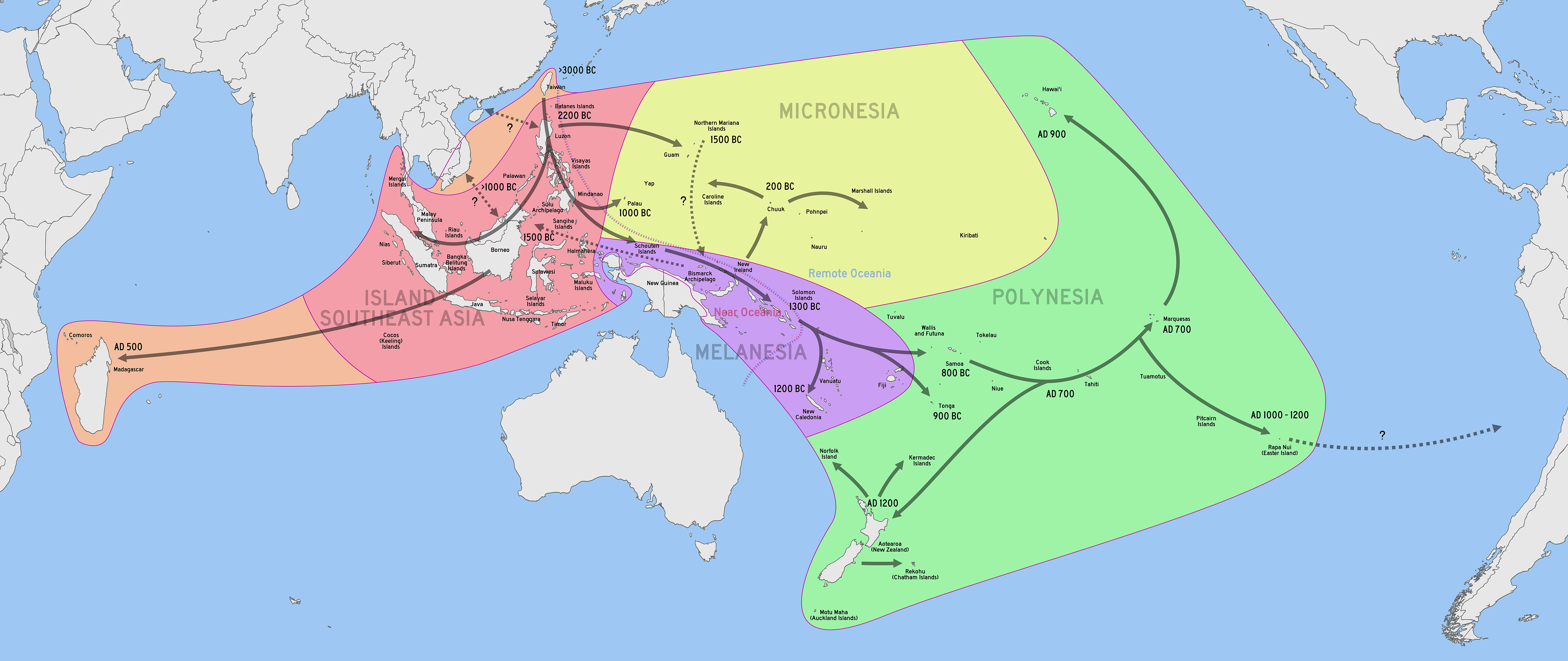
The Austronesian Expansion (3500 BC to AD 1200)

It has been speculated the rice did not survive the Austronesian voyages into Micronesia due to the sheer distance of ocean they were crossing and the lack of abundant rain. These voyagers became the ancestors of the Lapita culture. By the time they migrated southwards to the Bismarck Archipelago, they had already lost the technology of rice farming. However, there is no archaeological record of rice in Polynesia and Micronesia before or during the time of Lapita pottery fitting the hypothesis.

Rice, along with other Southeast Asian food plants, were also later introduced to Madagascar, the Comoros, and the coast of East Africa by around the 1st millennium AD by Austronesian settlers from the Greater Sunda Islands.

Much later Austronesian voyages from Island Southeast Asia succeeded in bringing rice to Guam during the Latte Period (AD 900 to AD 1700). Guam is the only island in Oceania where rice was grown in pre-colonial times.

Within Mainland Southeast Asia, rice was presumably spread through river trade between the early Hmong–Mien speakers of the Middle Yangtze basin and the early Kra–Dai speakers of the Pearl River and Red River basins, as well as the early Austroasiatic speakers of the Mekong River basin. Evidence for rice cultivation in these regions, dates to slightly later than the Dapenkeng settlement of Taiwan, at around 3000 BC. Southward migrations of the Austroasiatic and Kra–Dai speakers introduced it into Mainland Southeast Asia. The earliest evidence of rice cultivation in Mainland Southeast Asia come from the Ban Chiang site in northern Thailand (ca. 2000 to 1500 BC); and the An Sơn site in southern Vietnam (ca. 2000 to 1200 BC). A genomic study indicates that rice diversified into Maritime Southeast Asia between 2,500 and 1,500 years ago.

=== Korean peninsula and Japanese archipelago ===
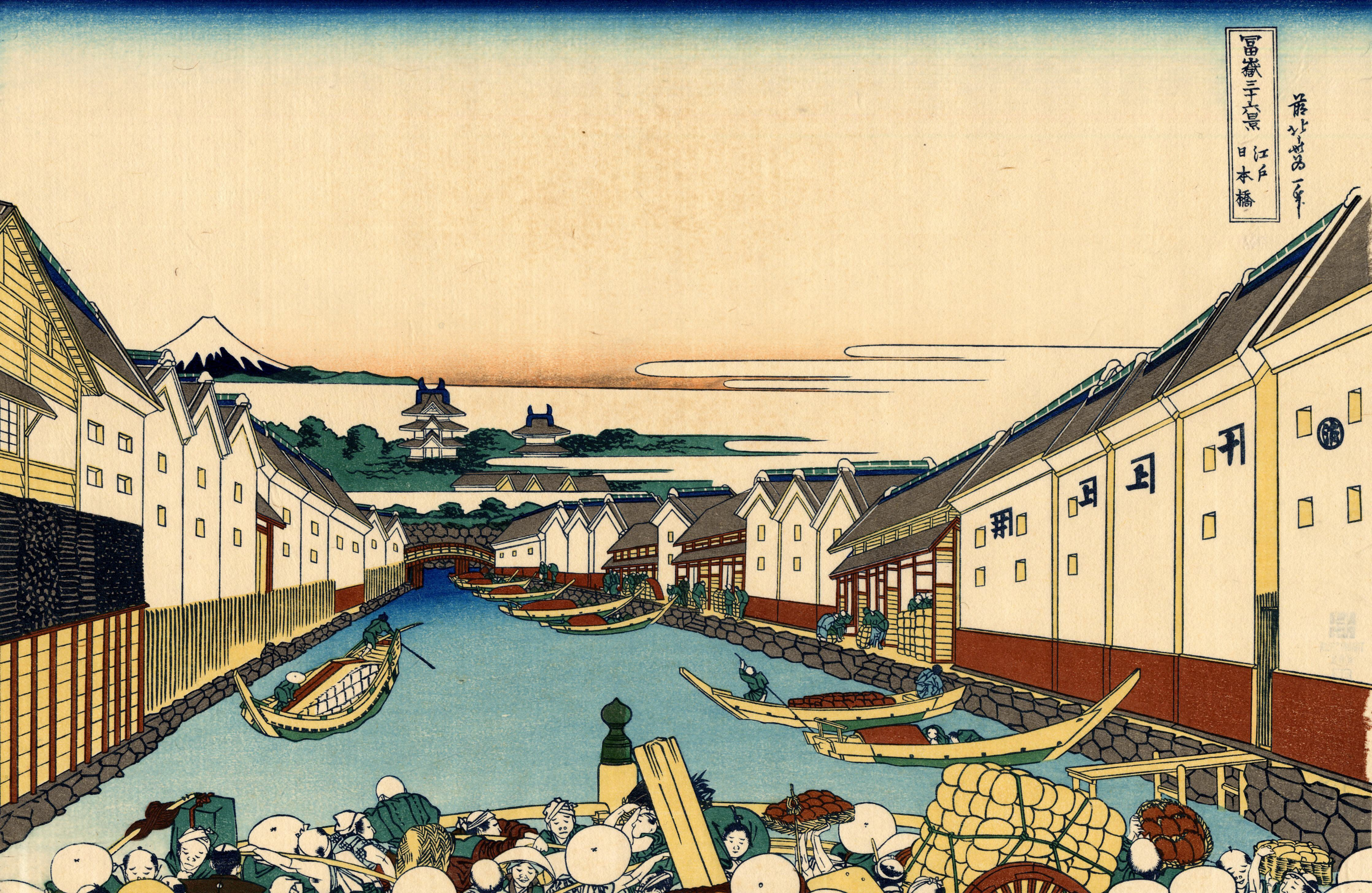
Rice broker in 1820s Japan of the Edo period ("36 Views of Mount Fuji" Hokusai)

Mainstream archaeological evidence derived from paleoethnobotanical investigations indicate dry-land rice was introduced to Korea and Japan sometime between 3500 and 1200 BC. The cultivation of rice then occurred on a small scale, fields were impermanent plots, and evidence shows that in some cases domesticated and wild grains were planted together. The technological, subsistence, and social impact of rice and grain cultivation is not evident in archaeological data until after 1500 BC. For example, intensive wet-paddy rice agriculture was introduced into Korea shortly before or during the Middle Mumun pottery period (circa 850–550 BC) and reached Japan by the final Jōmon or initial Yayoi periods circa 300 BC. A genomic study indicates that temperate japonica, which predominates in Korea and Japan, evolved after a global cooling event (the 4.2k event) that occurred 4,200 years ago.

=== Indian subcontinent ===
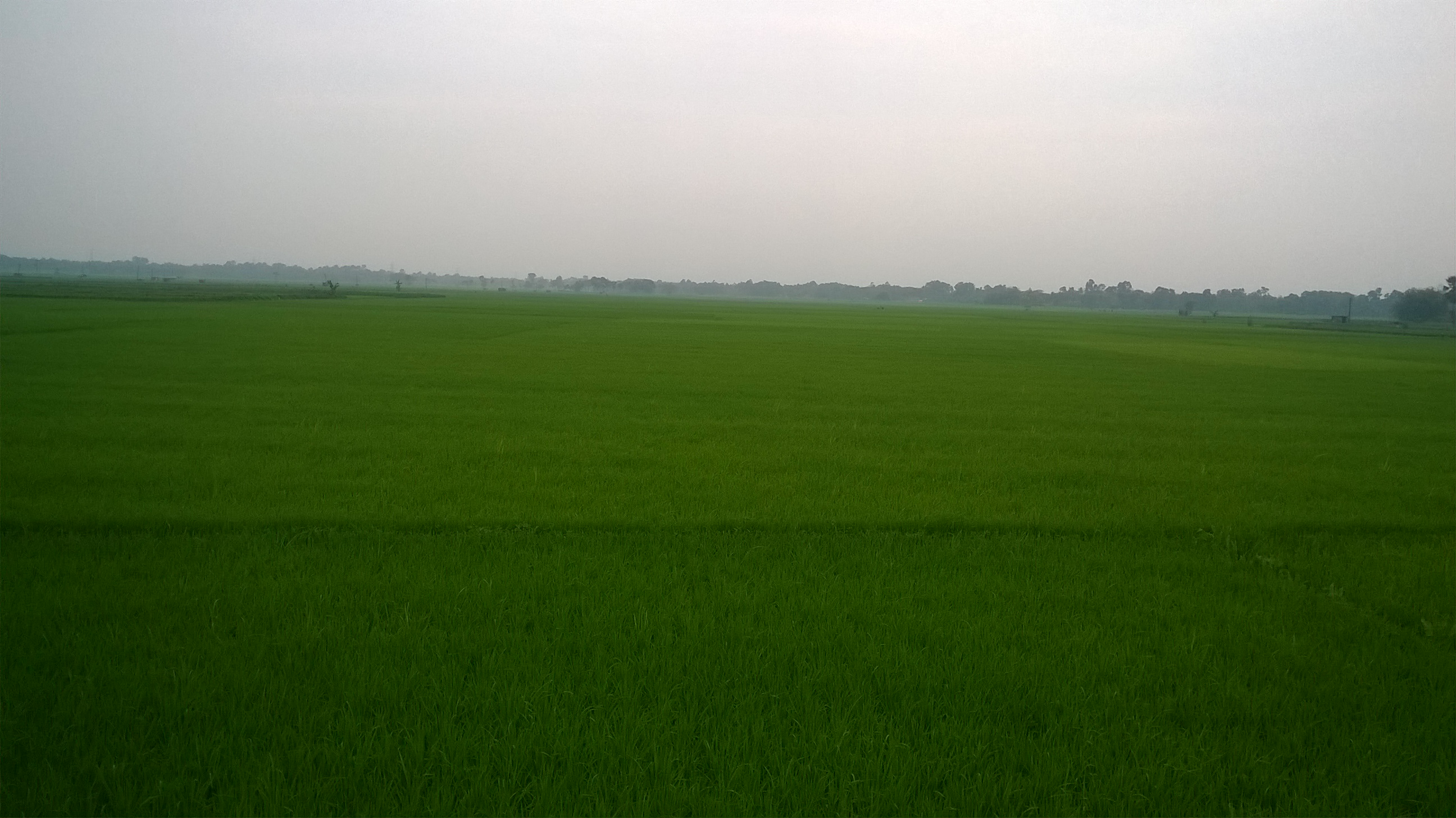
Paddy field in West Bengal, India

Evidence for rice consumption in India since 6000 BCE is found at Lahuradewa in Uttar Pradesh. However, whether or not the samples at Lahuradewa belong to domesticated rice is still disputed: earliest unambiguous domesticated rice grains of Northern India are dated ca. 2000 BCE, whereas other rice grains dated during ca. 4800 to 3500 BCE are considered as wild or uncertain whether wild/domesticated. Rice was consumed in the Indian subcontinent from as early as 5,000 BC: "Several wild cereals, including rice, grew in the Vindhyan Hills, and rice cultivation, at sites such as Chopani-Mando and Mahagara, may have been underway as early as 7,000 BP." Rice appeared in the Ganges valley regions of northern India as early as 4530 BC and 5440 BC, respectively. The early domestication process of rice in ancient India was based around the wild species Oryza nivara. This led to the local development of a mix of 'wetland' and 'dryland' agriculture of local Oryza sativa var. indica rice agriculture, before the truly 'wetland' rice Oryza sativa var. japonica, arrived around 2000 BC.

In the Ganges Plain, the unambiguous beginning of Neolithic sites with evidence of rice farming is after mid-3rd millennium BCE, and mainly after 2000 BCE, with older "possible origins" in 4th millennium BCE. Earlier datings of 7th millennium BCE have been called into question, as the earliest remains at such sites as Lahuradewa are more likely considered as "intermittent" occupation by hunter-gatherers who collected wild rice and hunted wild animals, and it probably was not until the 3rd millennium BCE when settlement became "more regular" with unambiguous evidence of domesticated rice and domesticated animals. Fresh re-examination and re-dating of rice farming sites such as Koldihwa (formerly considered as dating to 7th millennium BCE) has confirmed that Neolithic occupation began c. 1900 BCE. Dorian Fuller — an archaeobotanist — has stated that: "Caution is warranted in considering early/mid-Holocene radiocarbon dates reported from this region" (i.e., Ganges Plains), as earliest datings "would appear to be residual within their archaeological contexts, or represent very old wood".

Rice was cultivated in the Indus Valley Civilization (3rd millennium BC). Agricultural activity during the second millennium BC included rice cultivation in the Kashmir and Harrappan regions. Mixed farming was the basis of Indus Valley economy.

O. sativa was recovered from a grave at Susa in Iran (dated to the first century AD) at one end of the ancient world, while at the same time rice was grown in the Po valley in Italy. In northern Iran, in Gilan Province, many indica rice cultivars including 'Gerdeh', 'Hashemi', 'Hasani', and 'Gharib' have been bred by farmers.

=== Africa ===
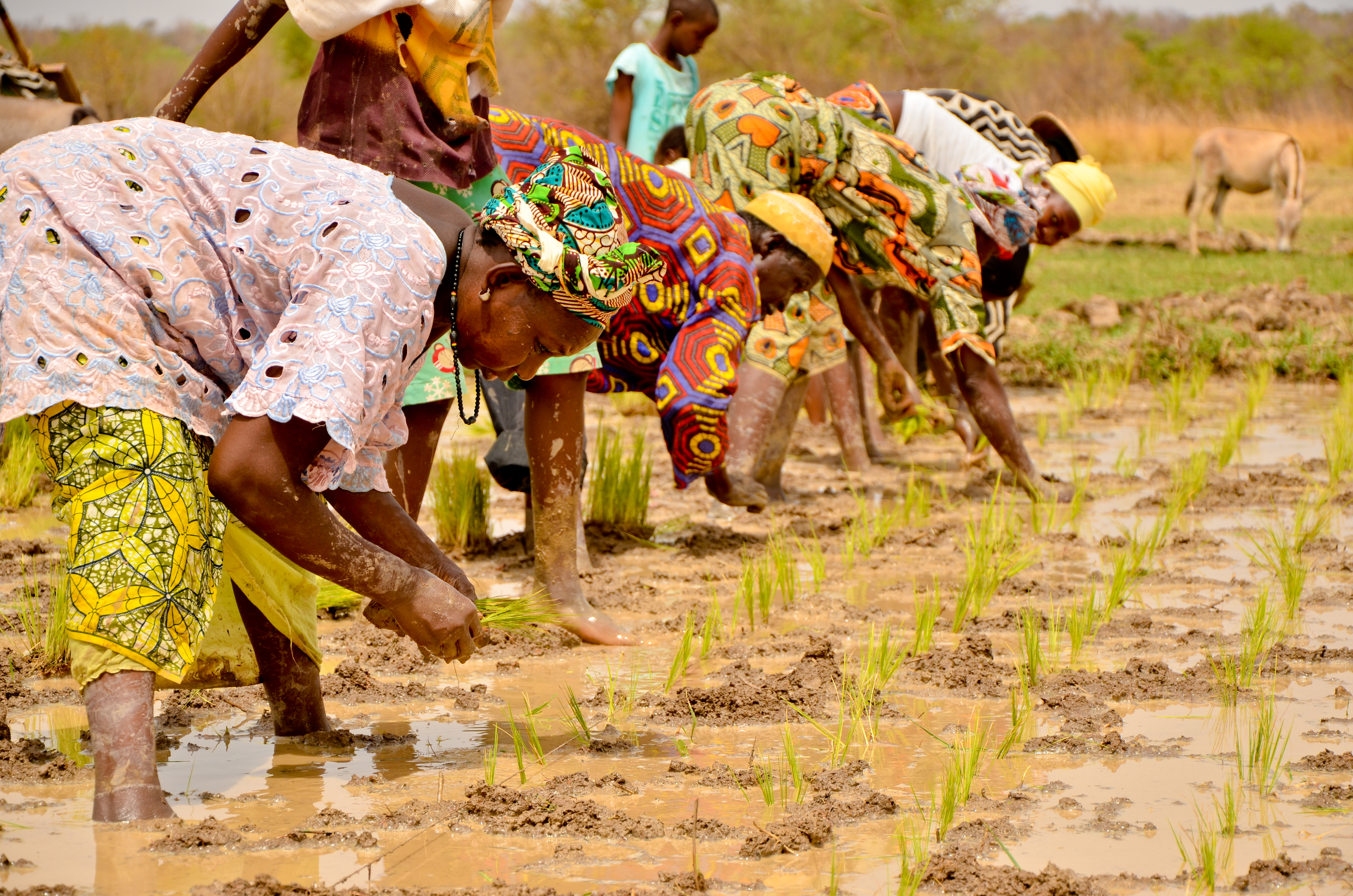
Rice farmers work in the fields of Gambia.

Although Oryza sativa was domesticated in Asia, the now less popular Oryza glaberrima rice was independently domesticated in Africa 3,000 to 3,500 years ago. Between 1500 and 800 BC, Oryza glaberrima propagated from its original centre, the Niger River delta, and extended to Senegal. However, it never developed far from its original region. Its cultivation even declined in favour of the Asian species, which was introduced to East Africa early in the common era and spread westward.

African women's involvement in the cultivation of rice throughout Africa is vital. They play a significant role in rice cultivation in Africa through their rice farming practices and traditional production methods that highlight their importance in the rice production field. African women through the course of history have harvested the rice crop and furthermore provided a principal food staple of the Western region of Africa.

=== Europe ===
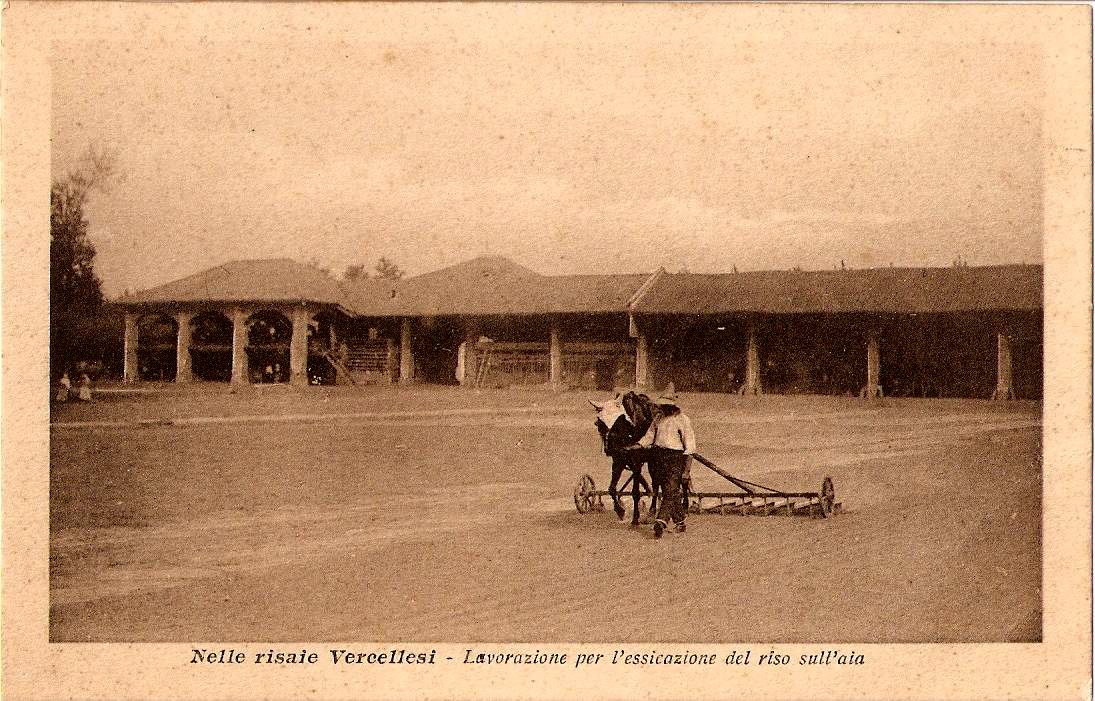
Paddy fields in Piedmont (Northern Italy) in 1920s

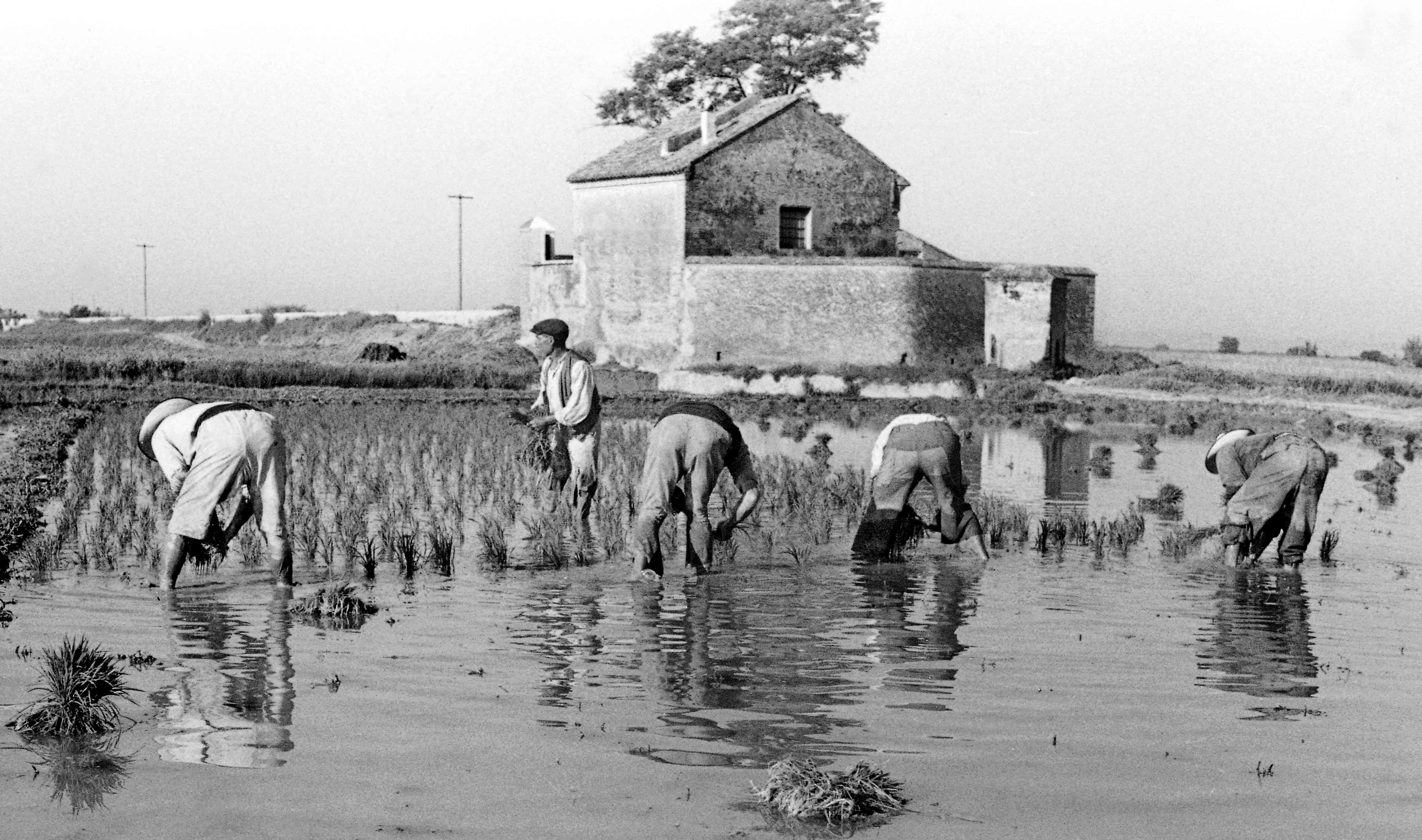
Planting rice, 1949 (Alginet-Valencian Country)

Rice was known to the Classical world, being imported from Egypt, and perhaps west Asia. It was known to Greece (where it is still cultivated in Macedonia and Thrace) by returning soldiers from Alexander the Great's military expedition to Asia. Large deposits of rice from the first century AD have been found in Roman camps in Germany. However, it was not a staple of the Greek diet until the 10th century. Prior to this, barley and wheat were the primary grains cultivated and consumed in Greece. Over time, rice gradually replaced these traditional grains as a staple ingredient in many Greek dishes.

The Ummayad Caliphate brought Asiatic rice to the Iberian Peninsula in the 8th century where it expanded progressively from the south. In Majorca, rice cultivation seems to have stopped after the Christian reconquest, although historians are not certain.

The Islamic powers may have also brought rice to Sicily, with cultivation starting in the 9th century, where it was an important crop long before it is noted in the plain of Pisa (1468) or in the Lombard plain (1475), where its cultivation was promoted by Ludovico Sforza, Duke of Milan, and demonstrated in his model farms.

After the 15th century, rice spread throughout Italy and then France, later propagating to all the continents during the age of European exploration.

In Russia, a short-grain, starchy rice similar to the Italian varieties, has been grown in the Krasnodar Krai, and known in Russia as "Kuban Rice" or "Krasnodar Rice". In the Russian Far East several japonica cultivars are grown in Primorye around the Khanka lake. Increasing scale of rice production in the region has recently brought criticism towards growers' alleged bad practices in regard to the environment.

=== America ===
Recent research indicates that rice was independently domesticated in South America before the 14th century from Amazon wild rice.

=== Controversies ===
The origin of Oryza sativa rice domestication has been a subject of much debate among those who study crop history and anthropology – whether rice originated in India or China. Asian rice, Oryza sativa, is one of the oldest crop species. It has tens of thousands of varieties and two major subspecies, japonica and indica. Archeologists focusing on East and Southeast Asia argue that rice farming began in south-central China along the Yangtze River and spread to Korea and Japan from there south and northeast. Archaeologists working in India argue that rice cultivation started in the valley of the Ganges River and Indus valley, by peoples unconnected to those of the Yangtze.

A 2012 study, through genome sequencing and mapping of hundreds of rice varieties and that of wild rice populations, indicated that the domestication of rice occurred around the central Pearl River valley region of southern China, in contradiction to archaeological evidence. The study is based on modern distribution maps of wild rice populations which may be potentially inconclusive due to drastic climatic changes that happened during the end of the last glacial period, ca. 12,000 years ago. However, the climate in regions north of the Pearl River would likely be less suitable for this wild rice. Human activity over thousands of years may also have removed populations of wild rice from their previous ranges. Based on Chinese texts, it is speculated there are populations of native wild rice along the Yangtze basin in c. AD 1,000 that have recently become extinct.

An older theory, based on one chloroplast and two nuclear gene regions, Londo et al. (2006) had proposed that O. sativa rice was domesticated at least twice—indica in eastern India, Myanmar, and Thailand; and japonica in southern China and Vietnam—though they concede that archaeological and genetic evidence exist for a single domestication of rice in the lowlands of southern China.

In 2003, Korean archaeologists announced they discovered rice husks in Soro-ri, Korea, which dated to 13,000 BC, that they claimed show signs of having been cut by stone tools. These antedates the oldest grains found in China, which were dated to 10,000 BC, and potentially challenge the explanation that domesticated rice originated in the Yangtze River basin of China. The findings were received by academia with strong skepticism and the claim remains dubious. The dates claimed by the authors of the study at Soro-ri are disputed, since they did not use the much more reliable accelerator mass spectrometry (AMS) carbon dating. A 2013 study using AMS carbon dating on seven samples of the actual rice husks have resulted in only one of the samples being dated to 12,520 ± 150 BP, with the other six being discovered to date to modern times. This inconsistency has not been explained. The evidence of the claimed cuts on the rice stalks are also inadequately explained. It is also unlikely for rice to be able to grow in Korea during the Oldest Dryas, when the climate was much colder. Lastly, apart from the husks, no other remains of rice plants have been recovered from the site, which opens the possibility that even if the rice husks were as old as claimed, it is still more likely that they may have been transported from warmer regions in some manner (either by migratory birds or Paleolithic foragers) and were not grown there.

== Regional history ==
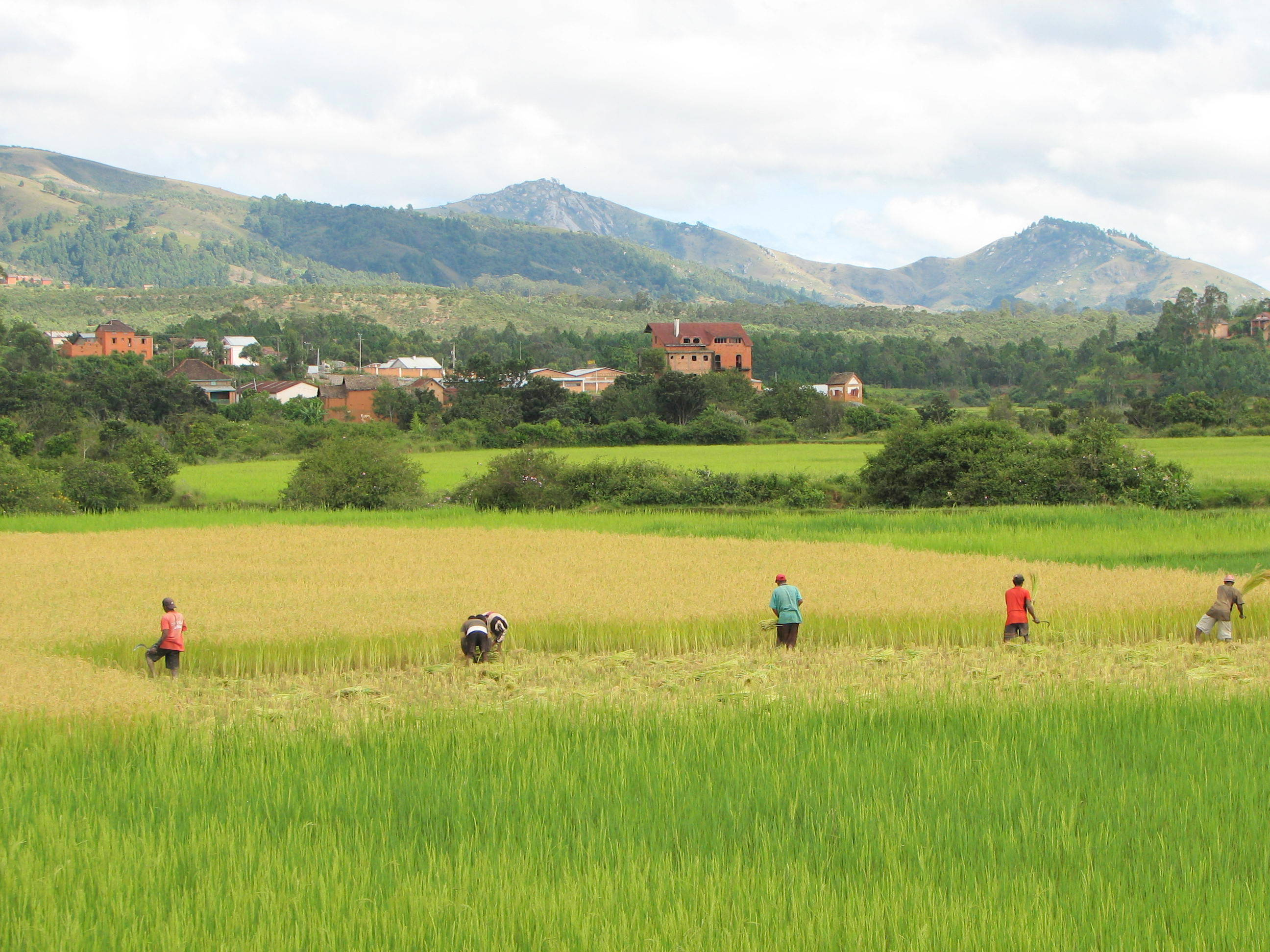
Rice crop in Madagascar

=== Asia ===
Today, the majority of all rice produced comes from China, India, Indonesia, Bangladesh, Vietnam, Thailand, Myanmar, Philippines, Korea and Japan. Asian farmers still account for 87% of the world's total rice production.

==== Indonesia ====
Rice is a staple food for all classes in contemporary Indonesia, and it holds the central place in Indonesian culture and Indonesian cuisine: it shapes the landscape; is sold at markets; and is served in most meals. Rice accounts for more than half of the calories in the average diet, and the source of livelihood for about 20 million households. The importance of rice in Indonesian culture is demonstrated through the reverence of Dewi Sri, the rice goddess of ancient Java and Bali.

Evidence of wild rice on the island of Sulawesi dates from 3000 BC. Historic written evidence for the earliest cultivation, however, comes from eighth century stone inscriptions from the central island of Java, which show kings levied taxes in rice. The images of rice cultivation, rice barn, and mice infesting a rice field is evident in Karmawibhangga bas-reliefs of Borobudur. Divisions of labour between men, women, and animals that are still in place in Indonesian rice cultivation, were carved into relief friezes on the ninth century Prambanan temples in Central Java: a water buffalo attached to a plough; women planting seedlings and pounding grain; and a man carrying sheaves of rice on each end of a pole across his shoulders (pikulan). In the sixteenth century, Europeans visiting the Indonesian islands saw rice as a new prestige food served to the aristocracy during ceremonies and feasts.

==== Nepal ====
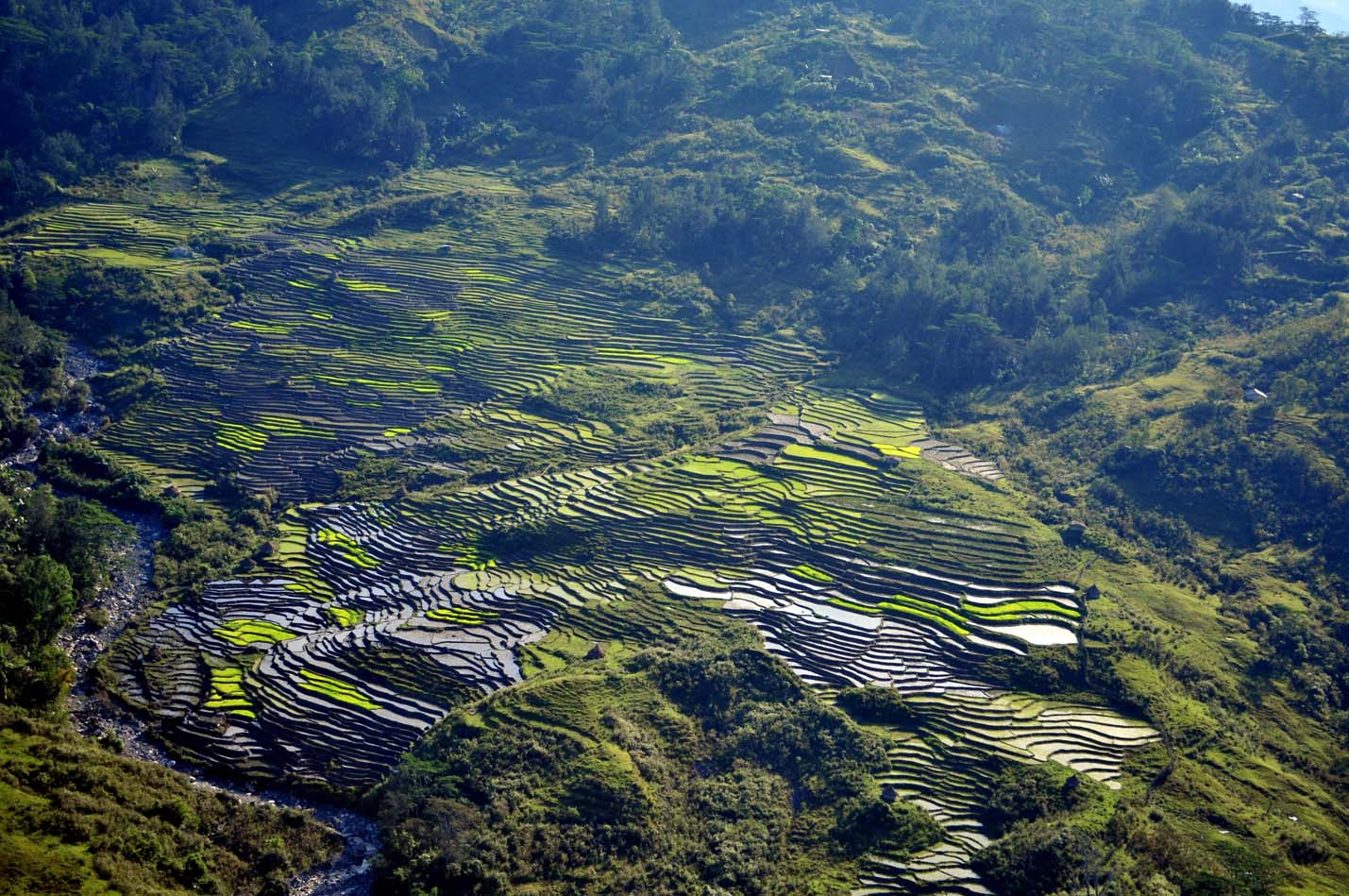
Rice fields in Dili, East Timor

Rice is the major food amongst all the ethnic groups in Nepal. In the Terai, most rice varieties are cultivated during the rainy season. The principal rice growing season, known as "Berna-Bue Charne", is from June to July when water is sufficient for only a part of the fields; the subsidiary season, known as "Ropai" is from April to September, when there is usually enough water to sustain the cultivation of all rice fields. Farmers use irrigation channels throughout the cultivation seasons. Nepal's food security depends on the production of staple cereals with rice being the main cereal. Rice is grown on 1.49 million ha in Nepal with an average productivity of 3.5 t/ha and total annual production of 5.6 million tons in 2018 (MoALD, 2019).

==== Pakistan ====
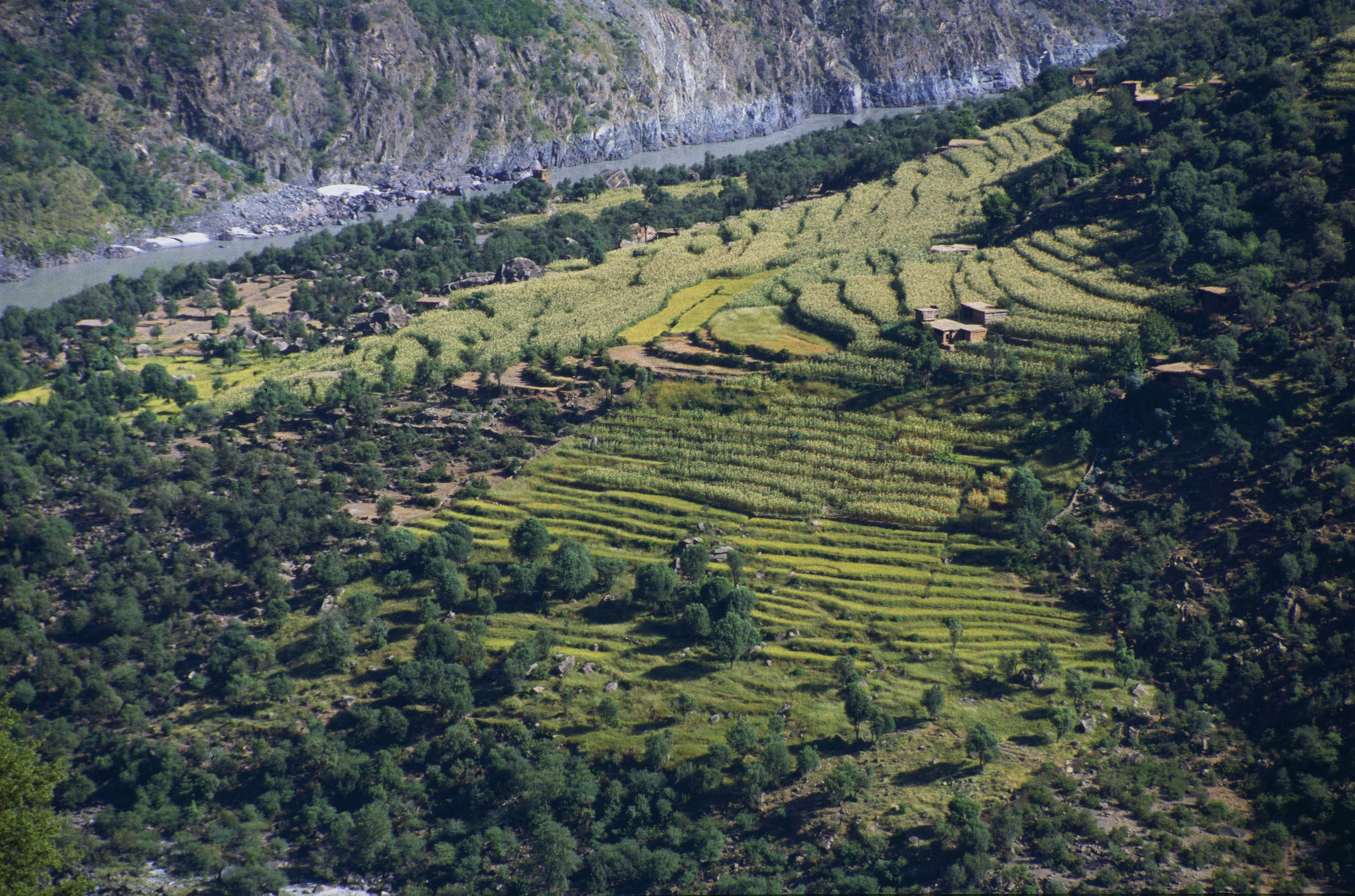
Rice fields near the Indus river, Pakistan

Pakistan is one of the 10 largest rice producing country in the world. Rice of different varieties are cultivated in 3.35 million hectares with an annual production of 8.5 million metric tons (as of 2021) (1.12% percent of global production). Pakistan constitutes 8% share in total world exports. Pakistan is the top exporter of brown rice (as of 2019). Pakistan exported around 415,053 tons of rice worth US$328 million. Pakistan constitutes 22.1% share in brown rice exports. The main producing areas are Sindh and Punjab. Pakistan is the 3rd highest rice exporting country in the world in terms of quantity and 4th highest in terms of value. Pakistan exported around 5.8 million tons of rice worth US$3.89 Billion.

==== Philippines ====
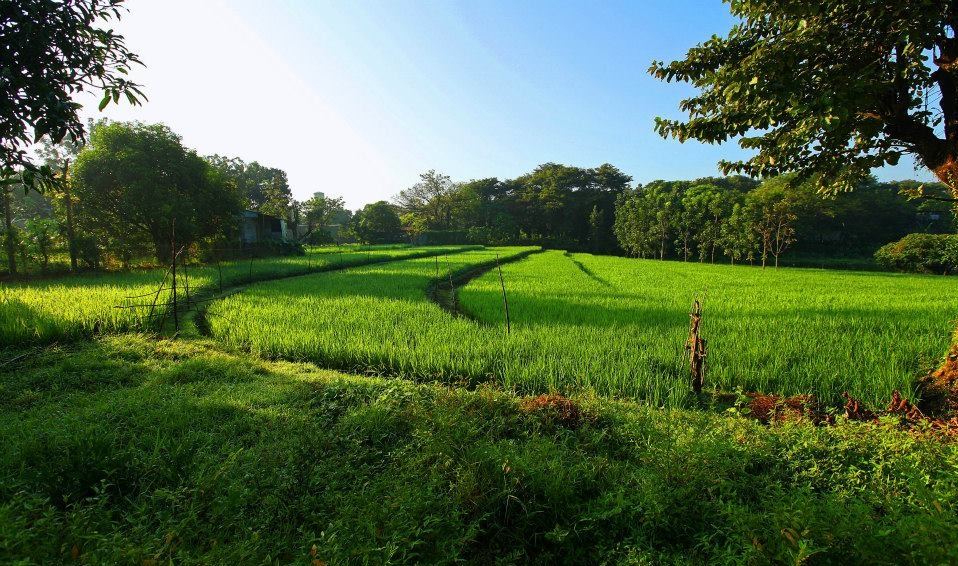
Ricefields at Santa Maria, Bulacan, Philippines

The Banaue Rice Terraces (Filipino: Hagdan-hagdang Palayan ng Banawe) are terraces that were carved into the mountains of Ifugao in the Philippines by the ancestors of the Igorot people. The Rice Terraces are commonly referred to as the "Eighth Wonder of the World". It is commonly thought that the terraces were built with minimal equipment, largely by hand. The terraces are located approximately 1,500 meters (5,000 ft) above sea level. They are fed by an ancient irrigation system from the rainforests above the terraces. It is said that if the steps were put end to end, it would encircle half the globe. The terraces are found in the province of Ifugao and the Ifugao people have been its caretakers. Ifugao culture revolves around rice and the culture displays an elaborate array of celebrations linked with agricultural rites from rice cultivation to rice consumption. The harvest season generally calls for thanksgiving feasts, while the concluding harvest rites called tango or tungul (a day of rest) entails a strict taboo on any agricultural work. Partaking of the bayah (rice beer), rice cakes, and betel nut constitutes an indelible practice during the festivities.

The Ifugao people practice traditional farming spending most of their labor at their terraces and forest lands while occasionally tending to root crop cultivation. The Ifugaos have also been known to culture edible shells, fruit trees, and other vegetables which have been exhibited among Ifugaos for generations. The building of the rice terraces consists of blanketing walls with stones and earth which are designed to draw water from a main irrigation canal above the terrace clusters. Indigenous rice terracing technologies have been identified with the Ifugao's rice terraces such as their knowledge of water irrigation, stonework, earthwork and terrace maintenance. As their source of life and art, the rice terraces have sustained and shaped the lives of the community members.

==== Sri Lanka ====
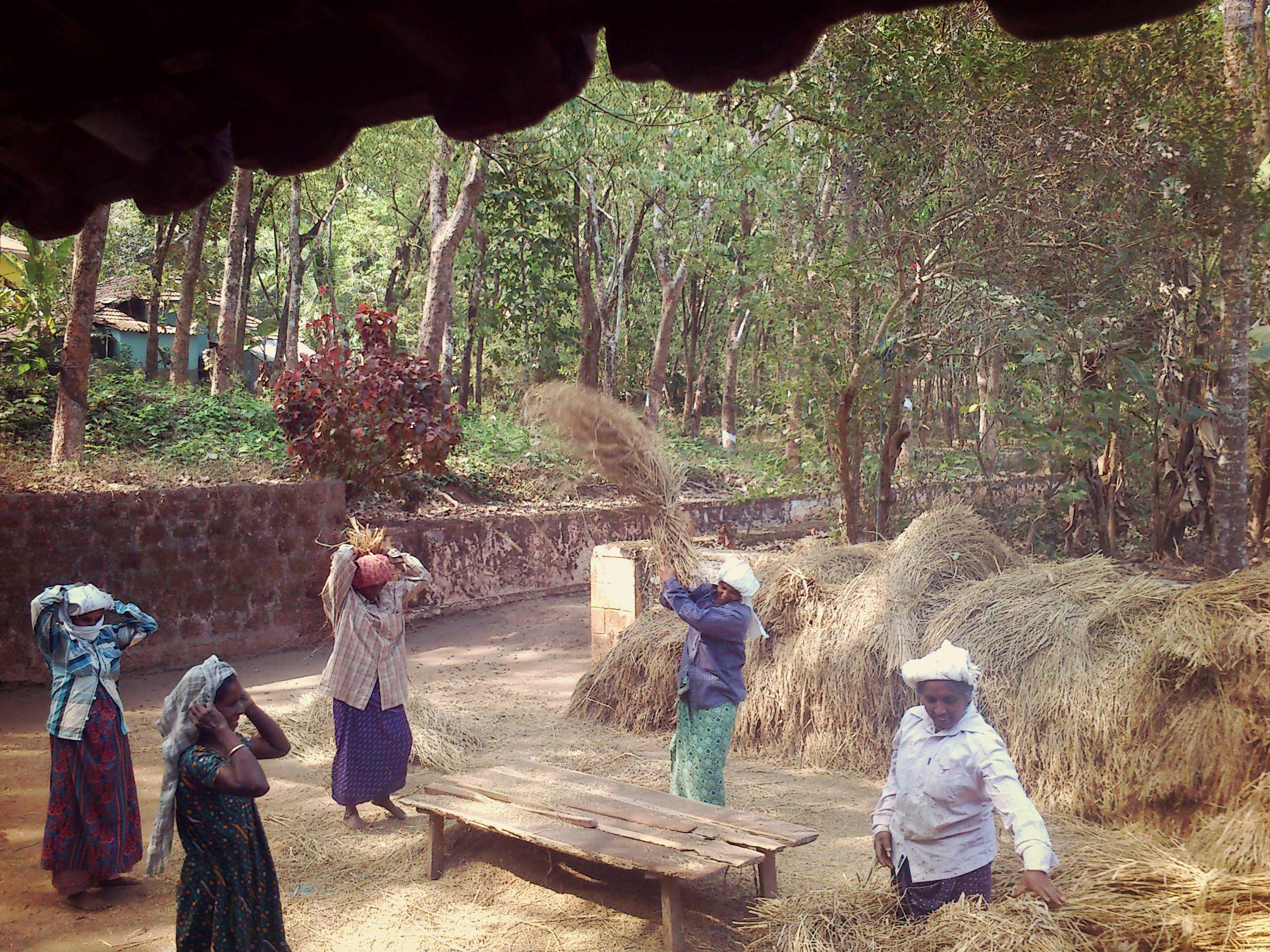
Indian women separating rice from straw

Rice is the staple food amongst all the ethnic groups in Sri Lanka. Agriculture in Sri Lanka mainly depends on the rice cultivation. Rice production is acutely dependent on rainfall and government supply necessity of water through irrigation channels throughout the cultivation seasons. The principal cultivation season, known as "Maha", is from October to March and the subsidiary cultivation season, known as "Yala", is from April to September. During Maha season, there is usually enough water to sustain the cultivation of all rice fields, nevertheless in Yala season there is only enough water for cultivation of half of the land extent. Traditional rice varieties are now making a comeback with the recent interest in green foods.

==== Thailand ====
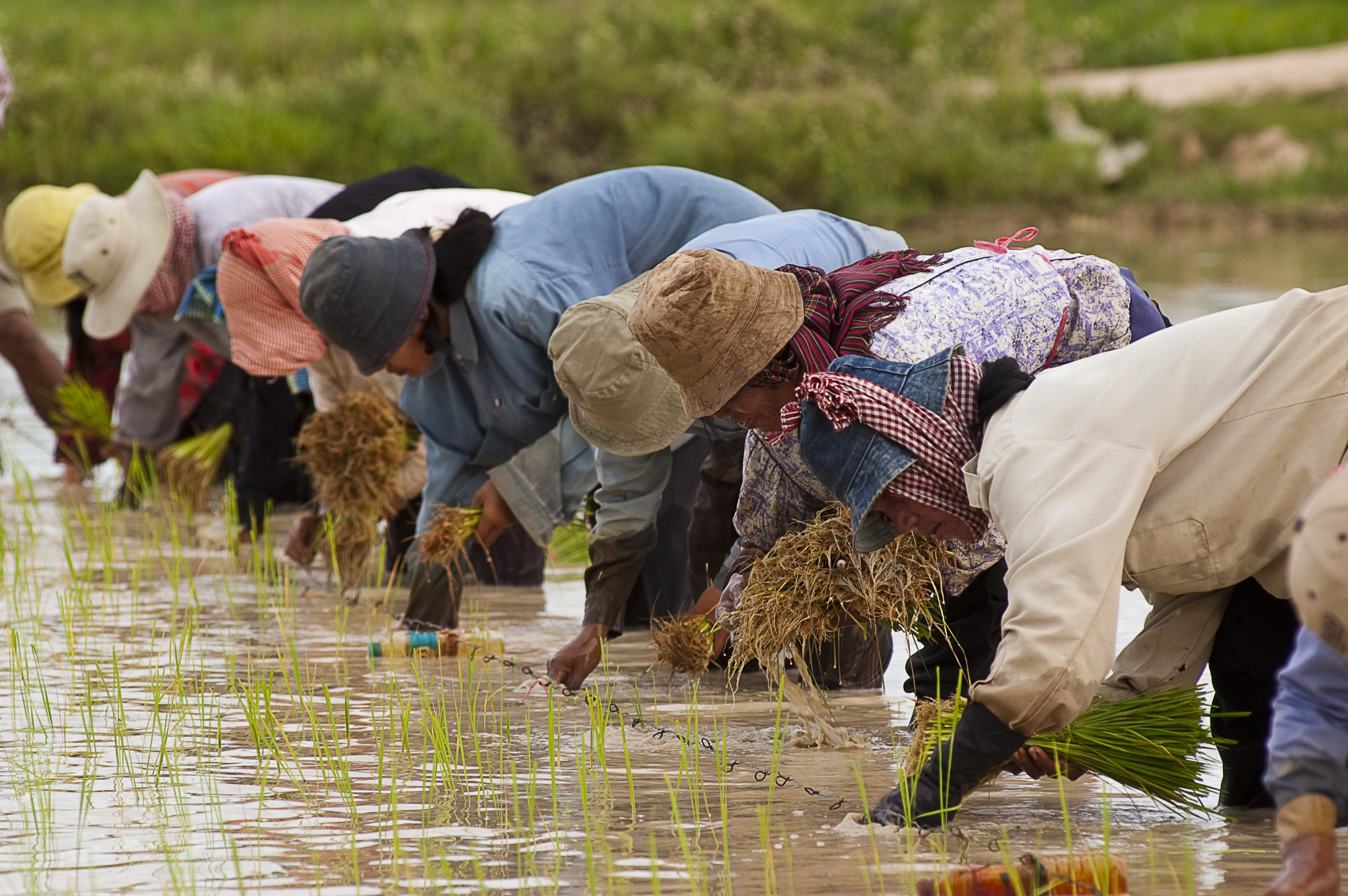
Cambodian women planting rice

Rice is the main export of Thailand, especially white jasmine rice 105 (Dok Mali 105). Thailand has a large number of rice varieties, 3,500 kinds with different characters, and five kinds of wild rice cultivates. In each region of the country there are different rice seed types. Their use depends on weather, atmosphere, and topography.

The northern region has both lowlands and high lands. The farmers' usual crop is non-glutinous rice such as Niew Sun Pah Tong rice. This rice is naturally protected from leaf disease, and its paddy (unmilled rice) (Thai: ข้าวเปลือก) has a brown color. The northeastern region is a large area where farmers can cultivate about 36 million square meters of rice. Although most of it is plains and dry areas, white jasmine rice 105—the most famous Thai rice—can be grown there. White jasmine rice was developed in Chonburi Province first and after that grown in many areas in the country, but the rice from this region has a high quality, because it is softer, whiter, and more fragrant. This rice can resist drought, acidic soil, and alkaline soil.

The central region is mostly composed of plains. Most farmers grow Jao rice. For example, Pathum Thani 1 rice which has qualities similar to white jasmine 105 rice. Its paddy has the color of thatch, and the cooked rice also has fragrant grains.

In the southern region, most farmers transplant around boundaries to the flood plains or on the plains between mountains. Farming in the region is slower than other regions because the rainy season comes later. The popular rice varieties in this area are the Leb Nok Pattani seeds, a type of Jao rice. Its paddy has the color of thatch, and it can be processed to make noodles.

==== Companion plant ====
One of the earliest known examples of companion planting is the growing of rice with Azolla, the mosquito fern, which covers the top of a fresh rice paddy's water, blocking out any competing plants, as well as fixing nitrogen from the atmosphere for the rice to use. The rice is planted when it is tall enough to poke out above the azolla. This method has been used for at least a thousand years.

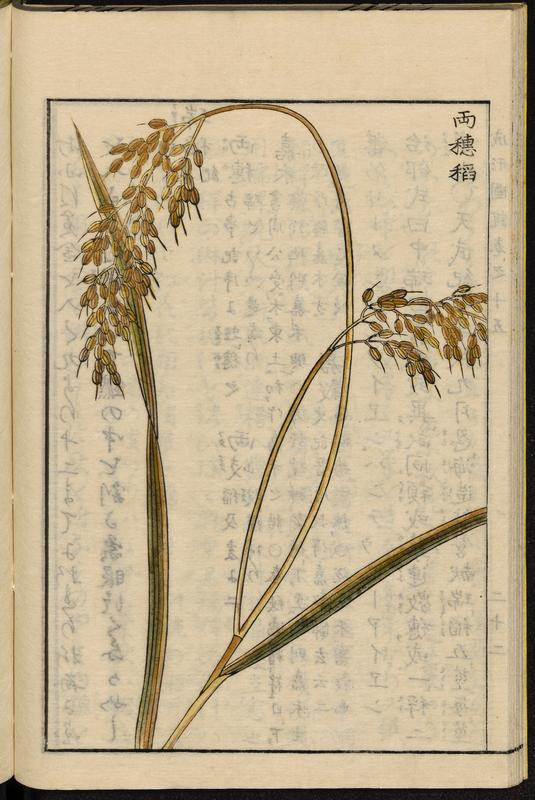
Double-headed rice, illustration from the Japanese agricultural encyclopedia Seikei Zusetsu (1804)

=== Middle East and the Mediterranean Basin ===
Asiatic rice (Oryza sativa), although a latecomer to Mediterranean agriculture, was relatively widespread in antiquity and was not a product of the Islamic Agricultural Revolution. During the Hellenistic period, rice was well known as far west as Parthia, in modern northeastern Iran. Diodorus (first century BCE) recognized rice as a significant Indian crop during the subcontinent's busy agricultural season. Strabo (first century CE) reported that rice was widely grown in Bactria, Babylon, Susis, and also in Lower Syria, based on second century BCE author Aristobulus. The crop traveled to Asia Minor (in modern-day Turkey) during the early centuries CE.

Texts from the late first and early second centuries imply that rice was first introduced to Palestine by Jewish farmers during the Early Roman period. Palestine's main crop was fine, large kernel rice. According to the Jerusalem Talmud (3rd to 4th centuries CE), rice was grown in Caesarea, Paneas-Caesarea Phillipi, and the Chrysopolis area to the north of the Sea of Galilee (in modern-day Israel).

Galen recommended the grain as a medicament in the second century, and his disciple Oribasius followed him in the fourth century.

By the time the Muslims arrived in Iraq, rice was already widely farmed throughout the Sasanian kingdom. The Babylonian Talmud describes its Mesopotamian cultivation, and implies it was an important part of the cuisine of Jews in Babylon. Following the Islamic conquest, its cultivation moved north to Nisibin, the southern shores of the Caspian Sea (in Gilan and Mazanderan provinces of Iran) and then beyond the Muslim world into the valley of the Volga. In Egypt, rice is mainly grown in the Nile Delta. In Palestine, rice came to be grown in the Jordan Valley. Rice is also grown in Saudi Arabia at Al-Ahsa Oasis and in Yemen.

=== Caribbean and Latin America ===
Most of the rice used today in the cuisine of the Americas is not native but was introduced to Latin America and the Caribbean by Europeans at an early date. However, there are at least two native (endemic) species of rice present in the Amazon region of South America, and one or both were used by the indigenous inhabitants of the region to create the domesticated form Oryza sp., some 4000 years ago.

Spanish colonizers introduced Asian rice to Mexico in the 1520s at Veracruz, and the Portuguese and Africans they enslaved introduced it at about the same time to colonial Brazil. Recent scholarship suggests that enslaved Africans played an active role in the establishment of rice in the New World and that African rice was an important crop from an early period. Varieties of rice and bean dishes that were a staple dish along the peoples of West Africa remained a staple among their descendants subjected to slavery in the Spanish New World colonies, Brazil and elsewhere in the Americas.

==== Chile ====
The Royal Governor Ambrosio O'Higgins was an early proponent of rice cultivation in Chile during his rule between 1788 and 1796. The first rice cultivation occurred however much later, around 1920, yielding mixed results. Various attempts in Central Chile followed, also yielding mixed results. In part, the failure to establish successful rice cultivation in the first attempts is attributed to the indiscriminate use of rice varieties from areas with tropical climate that did not grow well in central Chile's temperate climate. Early rice farmers had scant knowledge of the plant and learned chiefly by trial and error. Years later temperate climate varieties were imported but these ended up being mixed with the previously imported tropical varieties producing seeds that were labelled "semilla nacional". In the 1939–1940 season 13,190 hectares of rice existed in Chile and by this time rice cultivation had become one of the most profitable agricultural businesses in Chile. In 1939 a division of the Ministry of Agriculture of Chile begun to study rice cultivated in Chile. This work continued in the research station Estación Genética de Ñuble in the 1940s. Labour opportunities in the rice fields meant a salary increase and a generally improved economic situation for many rural workers. However, as salaries increased between 1940 and 1964 the profitability also decreased. Rice fields also used lands with poor clay-rich soils that were less suitable for other activities. By 1964 38,000 ha of rice were cultivated. Rice was cultivated as far south as the commune San Carlos.

=== North America ===
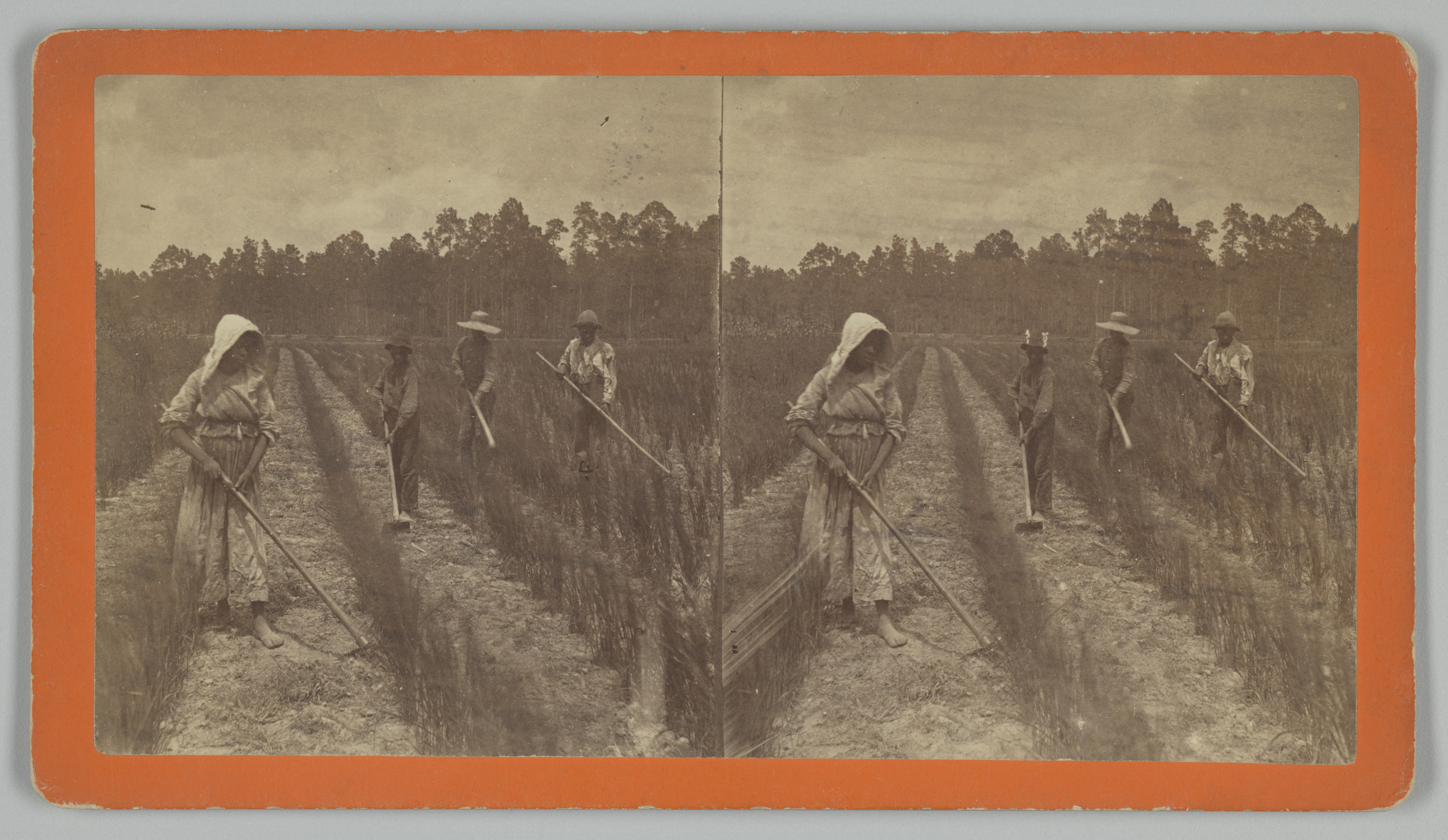
Photograph by Havens O. Pierre taken between 1876 and 1888 in Savannah, Georgia titled "Hoeing Rice"

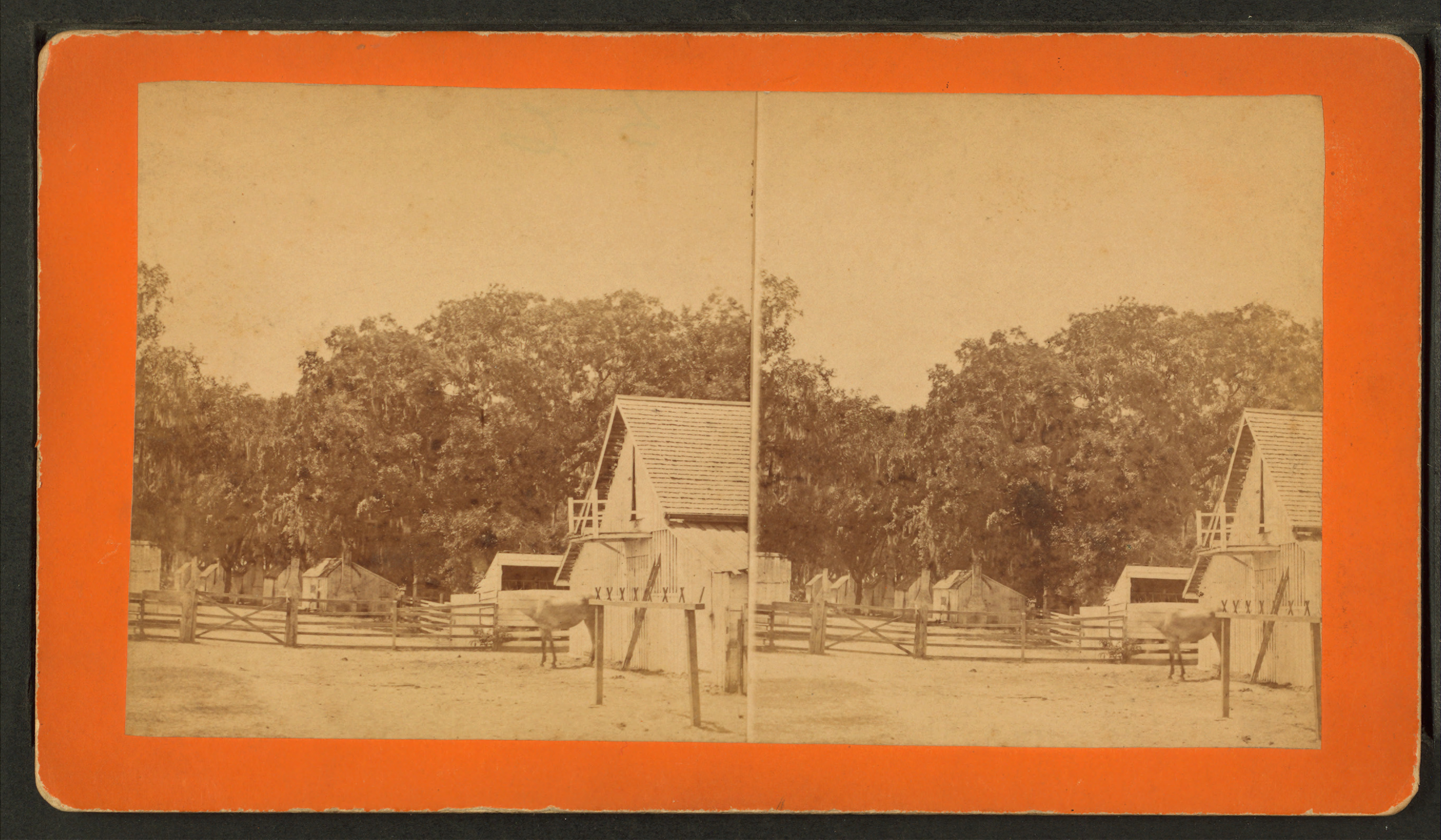
A rice plantation, where black slaves were forced to work, and cultivate rice. Historians have argued that the African slaves brought with them the knowledge of how to cultivate the rice, and were responsible for the growth of such a large agricultural industry in the United States south that fed an entire population for more information see Black Rice : The African Origins of Rice Cultivation in the Americas.

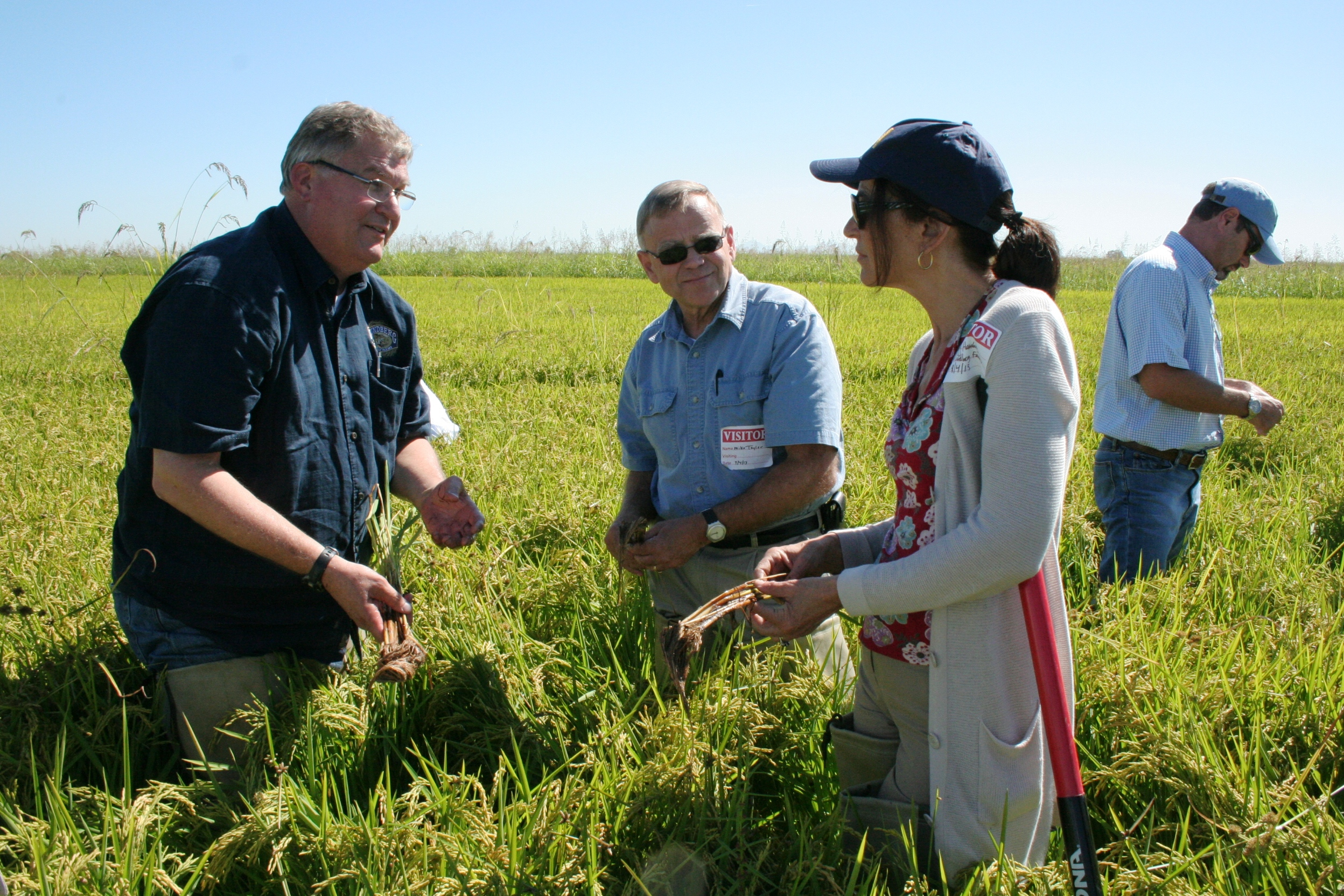
US Food and Drug Administration officials at a rice farm in California

In 1694, rice arrived in South Carolina, probably originating from Madagascar. Tradition (possibly apocryphal) has it that pirate John Thurber was returning from a slave-trading voyage to Madagascar when he was blown off course and put into Charleston for repairs. While there he gave a bag of seed rice to explorer Dr. Henry Woodward, who planted the rice and experimented with it until finding that it grew exceptionally well in the wet Carolina soil.

The mastery of rice farming was a challenge for the English and other European settlers who were unfamiliar with the crop. Native Americans, who mostly gathered wild rice, were also inexperienced with rice cultivation. However, within the first fifty years of settlement rice became the dominant crop in South Carolina.

In the United States, colonial South Carolina and Georgia grew and amassed great wealth from the slave labor obtained from the Senegambia area of West Africa and from coastal Sierra Leone. At the port of Charleston, through which 40% of all American slave imports passed, slaves from this region of Africa brought the highest prices due to their prior knowledge of rice culture, which was put to use on the many rice plantations around Georgetown, Charleston, and Savannah.

From the enslaved Africans, plantation owners learned how to dyke the marshes and periodically flood the fields. At first the rice was laboriously milled by hand using large mortars and pestles made of wood, then winnowed in sweetgrass baskets (the making of which was another skill brought by slaves from Africa). The invention of the rice mill increased profitability of the crop, and the addition of waterpower for the mills in 1787 by millwright Jonathan Lucas was another step forward.

Rice culture in the southeastern U.S. became less profitable with the loss of slave labor after the American Civil War, and it finally died out just after the turn of the 20th century. Today, people can visit the only remaining rice plantation in South Carolina that still has the original winnowing barn and rice mill from the mid-19th century at the historic Mansfield Plantation in Georgetown, South Carolina. The predominant strain of rice in the Carolinas was from Africa and was known as 'Carolina Gold'. The cultivar has been preserved and there are current attempts to reintroduce it as a commercially grown crop.

In the southern United States, rice has been grown in southern Arkansas, Louisiana, and east Texas since the mid-19th century. Many Cajun farmers grew rice in wet marshes and low-lying prairies where they could also farm crayfish when the fields were flooded. In recent years rice production has risen in North America, especially in the Mississippi embayment in the states of Arkansas and Mississippi (see also Arkansas Delta and Mississippi Delta).

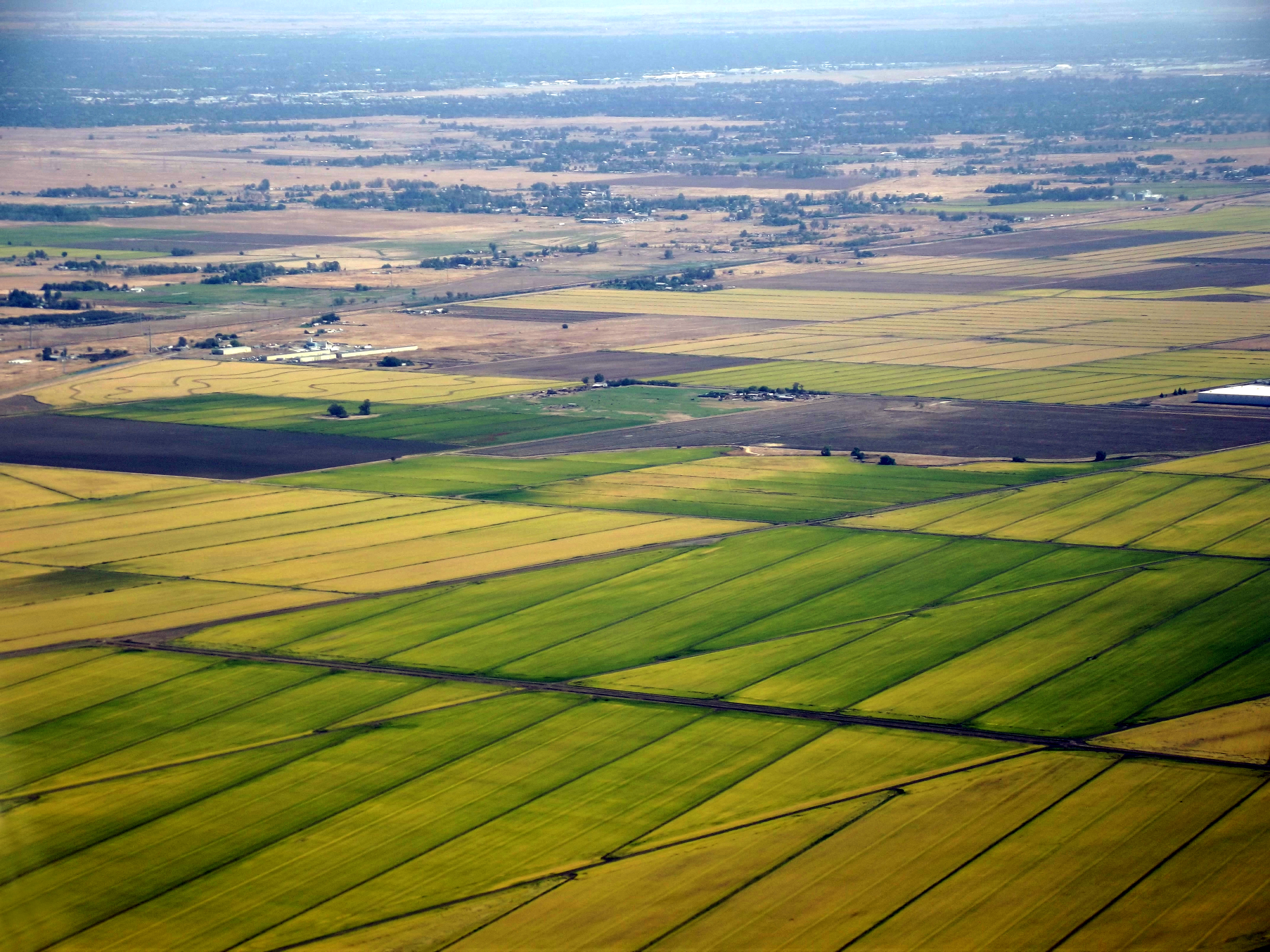
Rice paddy fields just north of the city of Sacramento, California

Rice cultivation began in California during the California Gold Rush, when an estimated 40,000 Chinese laborers immigrated to the state and grew small amounts of the grain for their own consumption. However, commercial production began only in 1912 in the town of Richvale in Butte County. By 2006, California produced the second-largest rice crop in the United States, after Arkansas, with production concentrated in six counties north of Sacramento. Unlike the Arkansas–Mississippi Delta region, California's production is dominated by short- and medium-grain japonica varieties, including cultivars developed for the local climate such as Calrose, which makes up as much as 85% of the state's crop.

References to "wild rice" native to North America are to Zizania palustris, and three other species in the related genus Zizania

More than 100 varieties of rice are commercially produced primarily in six states (Arkansas, Texas, Louisiana, Mississippi, Missouri, and California) in the U.S. According to estimates for the 2006 crop year, rice production in the U.S. is valued at $1.88 billion, approximately half of which is expected to be exported. The U.S. provides about 12% of world rice trade. The majority of domestic use of U.S. rice is direct food use (58%), while 16% is used in each of processed foods and beer. 10% is found in pet food.

=== Oceania ===
ವೃದ್ಧೆಯೊಬ್ಬರು ಹೇಳುವ 'ಬೊಂಬುಚಿ' ದಾಳಿಯ ಕಥೆ

Rice was one of the earliest crops planted in Australia by British settlers, who had experience with rice plantations in the Americas and India.

Although attempts to grow rice in the well-watered north of Australia have been made for many years, they have consistently failed because of inherent iron and manganese toxicities in the soils and destruction by pests.

In the 1920s, it was seen as a possible irrigation crop on soils within the Murray–Darling basin that were too heavy for the cultivation of fruit and too infertile for wheat.

Because irrigation water, despite the extremely low runoff of temperate Australia, was (and remains) very cheap, the growing of rice was taken up by agricultural groups over the following decades. Californian varieties of rice were found suitable for the climate in the Riverina, and the first mill opened at Leeton in 1951.

Monthly value (A$ millions) of rice imports to Australia since 1988

Even before this Australia's rice production greatly exceeded local needs, and rice exports to Japan have become a major source of foreign currency. Above-average rainfall from the 1950s to the middle 1990s encouraged the expansion of the Riverina rice industry, but its prodigious water use in a practically waterless region began to attract the attention of environmental scientists. These became severely concerned with declining flow in the Snowy River and the lower Murray River.

Although rice growing in Australia is highly profitable due to the cheapness of land, several recent years of severe drought have led many to call for its elimination because of its effects on extremely fragile aquatic ecosystems. The Australian rice industry is somewhat opportunistic, with the area planted varying significantly from season to season depending on water allocations in the Murray and Murrumbidgee irrigation regions.

Australian Aboriginal people have harvested native rice varieties for thousands of years, and there are ongoing efforts to grow commercial quantities of these species.
