= Koldihwa =

Indian archeological site

Koldiwa
- Location within Uttar Pradesh Location within India
- 24°54′N 82°2′E
- Type: Settlement
- Cultures: Mesolithic, Neolithic, Chalcolithic, Iron Age
- Location: Uttar Pradesh, India

History
- Built: 1900 BCE

Site notes
- Excavation dates: 1972–1976

Koldihwa is an archaeological site in Uttar Pradesh, India. It is situated in the valleys of Belan River near village Devghat. It is one of the few Neolithic sites in Uttar Pradesh. It features some of the earliest evidence of rice cultivation (Oryza sativa) and the discovery of horse bones.

== Features ==
In Koldihwa, archaeologists found evidence of rice and some fragmentary bones. The site was excavated from 1972 to 1976. Also, Koldihwa and Mahagara, both are on the opposite banks of Belan River. Both are in district Prayagraj. Both sites are earliest examples of rice cultivation. In Mahagara, apart from rice, evidence of cattle domestication such as hoof marks and bones of goat, sheep, horse, deer and wild boar were found on clay surfaces symbolic of cattle pen. This is in contrast with other neolithic sites of Indian subcontinent such as Mehrgarh, Chirand and Burzahom, where evidences of wheat were found instead of rice, and other sites of southern India, like Hallur and Paiyampalli, where evidences of millet was found as chief grains.

Remains of pottery and rice have been found to be from c. 7000 BCE according to carbon dating. However, such early carbon datings from Koldihwa have been disputed, as the site has "dates mainly of much later period (i.e. from the Second Millennium BC), and artifact assemblages consistent with the younger dates", suggesting that earlier datings "would appear to be residual within their archaeological contexts, or represent very old wood". Dorian Fuller — an archaeobotanist — has stated that: "Caution is warranted in considering early/mid-Holocene radiocarbon dates reported from this region" (i.e., Ganges Plains) Fresh re-examination and re-dating of Koldihwa has indicated that the site has "clear stratified occupation from the later Neolithic, starting after ca. 1900 BC". Fuller has concluded: "The unambiguous evidence for sedentary, agricultural villages after mid-third millennium and mainly after 2000 BC, as well as ceramic links, suggests that the Neolithic mainly of the later third millennium/early second millennium with possible origins in the earlier fourth millennium".

== See also ==
- Lahuradewa
