= Ancient Bath House of Nazareth =

Archaeological site in Israel

Coordinates: 32°42′22.5″N 35°18′05.5″E

The bathhouse near Mary's Well in Nazareth was discovered in the late 1990s by Elias and Martina Shama during renovations inside their shop near the Nazareth landmark. Archaeologists who examined the bathhouse have assigned its construction to various periods, mainly the Mamluk period, with some suggesting a Crusader-period date. The bathhouse is mentioned in a 15th-century travelogue.

== History of discovery ==
In the late 1990s, a local Nazareth couple, Elias and Martina Shama, discovered in their wall pipes and a portion of a tunnel. Digging through the wall, they discovered underground passages which, upon further digging, revealed a vast underground complex. According to Jonathan Cook, writing in December 2002:::

“Shama called in the Antiquities Authority whose officers told him he had found an Ottoman bathhouse, little more than a century old and of minimal interest. So Shama continued digging out the storage room and the cellar under his shop. After three years Shama had unearthed a beautiful high-vaulted room where he offered visitors coffee before guiding them through the hypocaust, the underfloor heating channels, to see the remains of a white marble floor supported by tile columns meeting in a complex array of arches.

The story might have ended there but for Shama's unshakable conviction that his discovery was no legacy from the Turkish invaders. A deeply religious Christian Arab, he was plagued by dreams of Jesus sitting in his bathhouse. He visited neighboring ancient sites to make comparisons. The Antiquities Authority's verdict seemed more and more implausible to him.

He found an ally in a senior archaeologist, Tzvi Shacham of Tel Aviv's Antiquities Museum, who visited the shop and advised the authority that Shama had found a much rarer bathhouse, from the Crusader period, some 1,000 years old.”

A North American research team conducted high-resolution ground penetrating radar (GPR) surveys at a number of locations in and around Mary’s Well in 2004-2005 to determine appropriate locations for further digging to be conducted beneath the bathhouse. Samples were collected for radio-carbon dating and the initial data from GPR readings seem to confirm the presence of additional subterranean structures.

== Date ==
In 2003, archaeologist Richard Freund stated his belief that the site was clearly of Roman-era origins: "I am sure that what we have here is a bathhouse from the time of Jesus," he says, "and the consequences of that for archaeology, and for our knowledge of the life of Jesus, are enormous."

Archaeologist Tzvi Shacham of Eretz Israel Museum in Tel Aviv wrote in 2012 that he considers the bathhouse to date back to the Crusader period, i.e. the 12th-13th centuries.

Carbon 14 dating was undertaken on three samples of charcoal, one being found to be quite recent, with two being dated somewhere between the 14th-15th centuries. The specialist, Dr. E. Boaretto, reminds us however that the "old wood effect" may mislead us, i.e. if the charred wood was already old by the time it was used as a plaster ingredient, the readings might indicate an age older by decades or even centuries than the actual construction date. She concludes that the bathhouse has been in use during the last millennium, while warning of the very wide margins of radiocarbon dating as of 2012.
