= Belan River =

River in the Indian state of Uttar Pradesh

Coordinates: 25°02′N 81°45′E

Belan River Its native name is also Belan.

Location
- Country: India
- State: Uttar Pradesh
- District: Sonbhadra, Mirzapur, Prayagraj

Physical characteristics
- Mouth: Confluence with Tons river near NH-27, Tonki village, Prayagraj district

Belan river is a river in the Indian state of Uttar Pradesh. It originates from Western part of Sonbhadra district, Uttar Pradesh. Later merges with Tons river. Is famous for prehistoric sites and existence since Paleolithic and Neolithic past periods of history. The valley in which this flows is named as Belan Valley. It is also famous for domesticated rice. The rives flow from major cities such as Sonbhadra dist- Mirzapur and Prayagraj. It is also known and famous for panchmukhi cave paintings in Subhadra.

== Origination ==
It originates in the western part of Sonbhadra district then flows in southern part of Mirzapur and Prayagraj districts.

== Confluence ==
In Prayagraj district it merges with Tons river, with the confluence being near NH-27 and Tonki village.

== Historical importance ==
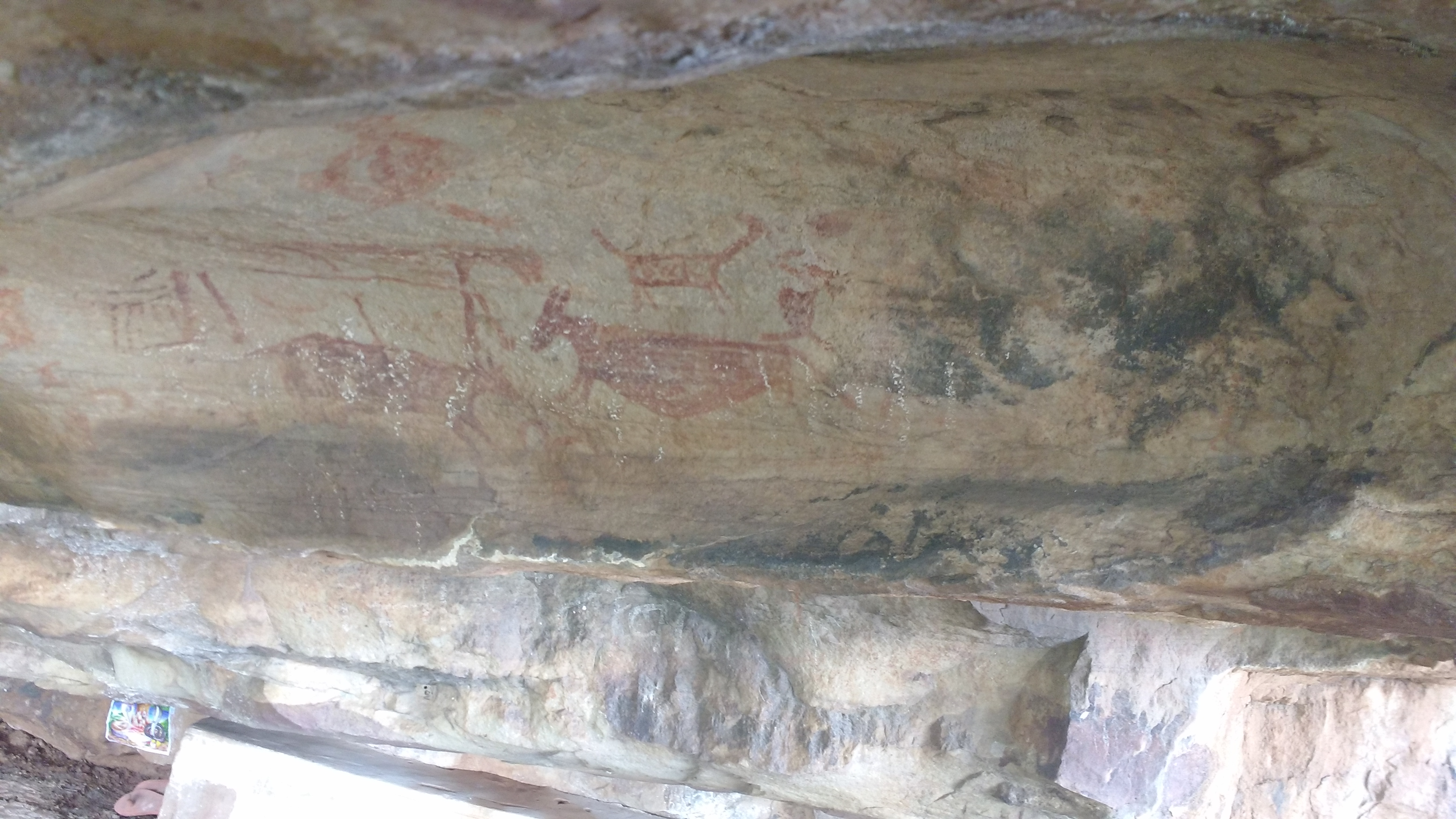
Belan Valley Cave Paintings at Panchmukhi Hill in Sonbhadra

The Belan is famous for prehistoric sites from the Neolithic period. Chopanimando is for pottery making and Koldihwa for cereals like rice. (both in Prayagraj district) are two important excavated sites, located on the northern fringes of Vindhyas on the banks of the Belan river.
