= Amazon wild rice =

Species of rice

Amazon wild rice refers to either of the two native (endemic) species of rice (Oryza) found in the Amazon region of South America and adjacent tropical areas, Oryza glumaepatula and Oryza latifolia. It also can refer to the cultivated form Oryza sp. (unnamed rice species) which was domesticated from one or both of the wild forms some 4,000 years ago by the indigenous people of the Amazon region. South America actually has 4 indigenous wild rice species, Oryza glumaepatula, Oryza latifolia, Oryza alta, and Oryza grandiglumis, all of which can be found in the Amazon basin of Brazil and could therefore be considered Amazonian wild rice.
