= Oryza latifolia =

Conservation status
- Least Concern (IUCN 3.1)

Scientific classification
- Kingdom: Plantae
- Clade: Embryophytes
- Clade: Tracheophytes
- Clade: Angiosperms
- Clade: Monocots
- Clade: Commelinids
- Order: Poales
- Family: Poaceae
- Genus: Oryza
- Species: O. latifolia

Binomial name
- Oryza latifolia Desv.

Synonyms
- Oryza alta Swallen (1936); Oryza latifolia var. grandispiculis A.Chev. (1932); Oryza platyphylla Schult. & Schult.f. (1830); Oryza sativa var. latifolia (Desv.) Döll (1877)

Species of grass

Oryza latifolia, the broadleaf rice, is a widespread species of grass (family Poaceae). It is native to wetter areas of Latin America and the Caribbean, and has been introduced to India, Bangladesh, Myanmar, Laos, and Vietnam. A facultative aquatic perennial, if flooded it can adapt by growing considerably taller.

Oryza alta, treated here as a synonym of O. latifolia, has been used in a genome-editing programme aimed at the de novo domestication of allotetraploid wild rice.
