= Chopani Mando =

Archeological site in Uttar Pradesh, India

- Location within Uttar Pradesh Location within India
- 24°55′N 82°5′E
- Type: Settlement
- Cultures: Mesolithic, Neolithic
- Location: Uttar Pradesh, India

History
- Built: 7000 BCE

Site notes
- Area: 1,500 m^{2} (16,000 sq ft)
- Excavation dates: 1967, 1977–1978
- Archaeologists: G. R. Sharma

Chopanimando, located in the Belan River valley in Prayagraj district, Uttar Pradesh, is a significant archaeological site marking the transition from food gathering to food production society. Excavated by G.R. Sharma, it revealed Mesolithic and Neolithic settlements, along with pottery and rice remains.

== Excavation ==
It is located around 77 km from Prayagraj at Bank of Belan river. The site is spread in 1500 sq. m. The site was excavated in 1967 and 1977 by G.R Sharma. A three-phase sequence of Paleolithic, Mesolithic, and Neolithic is attributed by archaeologists. Circular and oval settlement with hearths, hand-made cord-impressed pottery, and microliths, chalcedony are found here during excavation. Remains of pottery and rice have been found from 7000–6000 BCE.
