= Dorian Fuller =

American archaeologist

Dorian Q. Fuller (in Chinese: 傅稻镰) is an American archaeologist and professor of archaeobotany at the UCL Institute of Archaeology. Originally from San Francisco, he studied at Yale University (BA, 1995) and the University of Cambridge (MPhil, 1997; PhD, 2000).

He has carried out archaebotanical in parts of India, Sudan, China, Ethiopia, and Turkey (Çatalhöyük), and has published numerous article on the domestication of various crops, in particular rice.
