= Old wood effect =

Problems complicating the use of wood finds to date archaeological sites

The old wood effect or old wood problem is a pitfall that occurs in the archaeological technique of radiocarbon dating. A sample will provide misleading or confusing results if materials of different ages are deposited in the same context.

Stratification is not always clear-cut in practice. In the case of dating megalithic tombs, indirect evidence for the age of the tomb must always be obtained, because stone (or the time of moving a stone) cannot be dated. When a number of objects are recovered from one deposit, the terminus post quem is based on the dating from the 'youngest' find. Even though other items in the same stratum indicate earlier dates, they may have been deposited at the same time. The deposit must be as young, or younger than the youngest object it contains. Thus excavators look to post holes, pits, or find spots under the orthostats for clues to construction dates. The possibility that something (organic) was already in situ must always be considered, especially if the results appear suspiciously early.

The old wood problem can appear in marine archaeology. Researchers need to check if stumps from a Mesolithic or Palaeolithic submerged forest are to be found in the area. (If they do, the possibility of one sticking up through, e. g., a shipwreck and giving misleading dates must be considered.)

Organic samples which are not derived from the same part of an organism, may show dating variations which blur and obscure the interpretation being attempted. If compelling archaeological reasons for supposing that the ages come from exactly contemporary samples do not exist, then results must be regarded as suspect. If there exists no prior reason to believe that two samples are truly of the same age, and even if their ages are statistically indistinguishable, they are as likely to be as far apart in true age as the measured difference between them as they are to be of the same age.

Charcoal was seen historically as an ideal medium for carbon dating. When long-lived tree species, such as oak and juniper, are used, however, there is a particular danger of encountering the "old wood" problem. For example, the date being measured may be from heartwood, which is already many centuries old by the time the tree was felled. Another difficulty is that of a possible time-lag between felling and final deposition. The timber may have had an extensive history of use and re-use. A method of ameliorating this problem is to date young growth, if available, for example hazel twigs. Dating of artefacts using accelerator mass spectrometry is the gold standard dating method of today; charcoal-sourced dates are seen as unreliable. In establishing the chronology of a site, a representative spread of dates is required before interpretation can be attempted.
