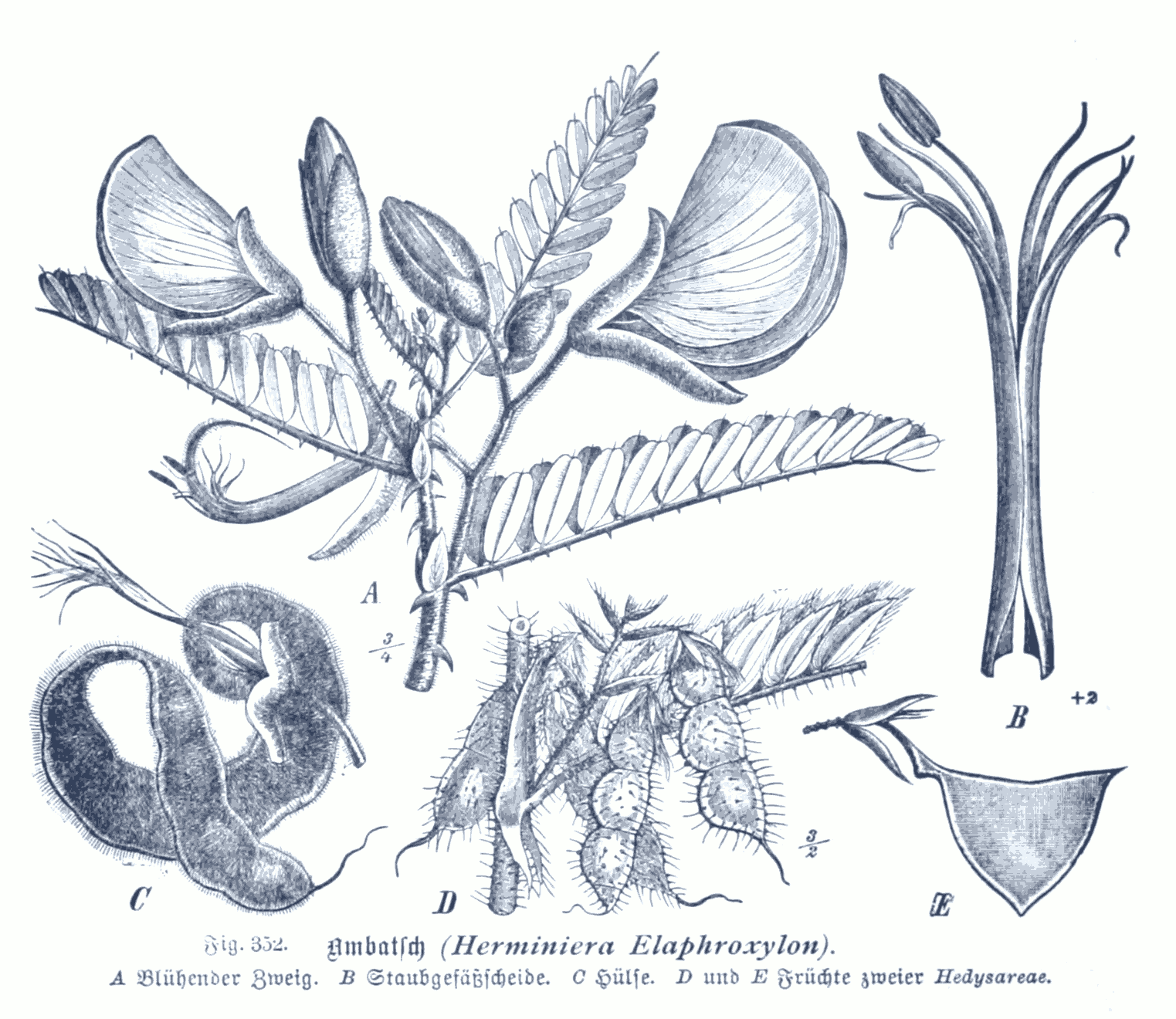

Conservation status
- Least Concern (IUCN 3.1)

Scientific classification
- Kingdom: Plantae
- Clade: Embryophytes
- Clade: Tracheophytes
- Clade: Angiosperms
- Clade: Eudicots
- Clade: Rosids
- Order: Fabales
- Family: Fabaceae
- Subfamily: Faboideae
- Genus: Aeschynomene
- Species: A. elaphroxylon

Binomial name
- Aeschynomene elaphroxylon (Guill. & Perr.) Taub.

Synonyms
- Herminiera elaphroxylon Guill. & Perr.; Smithia elaphroxylon (Guill. & Perr.) Baill.; Smithia grandidieri Baill.; Aedemone excelsa Kotschy; Aedemone humilis Kotschy; Aedemone mirabilis Kotschy; Aeschynomene tchadica A. Chev.

= Aeschynomene elaphroxylon =

Species of legume

Aeschynomene elaphroxylon, also known as an ambatch, pith-tree, balsa wood tree, or umburu, is a common large shrub to small tree in the genus Aeschynomene in the family Fabaceae, growing in swamps, lakes and rivers in Tropical Africa. This is an unusual leguminous tree in that it grows in water as a freshwater mangrove, with an extremely lightweight wood acting as a float and a specialised root system sprouting from the trunk which forms a tangled web hanging through the water and sprawling through the mud. It has adventitious roots and roots which are differentiated into special structures adapted to the swamp environment. It can even grow as floating islands of drifting forests.

The name 'ambatch' derives from the name of the plant in the Arabic dialect spoken in Nigeria known as Shuwa by the British. It is called Nile pith tree in Sri Lanka, ambach there and in Malaysia, or ambatsch in Malaysia.

The extremely light, spongy, but rot-resistant wood is traditionally used to make floats for fishing nets and the trunks are lashed together to make rafts, as well as more sophisticated items.

== Description ==
Aeschynomene elaphroxylon is an evergreen, semi-aquatic shrub or small tree often found growing in water. It grows two to nine, exceptionally up to twelve, metres high. The straight trunk is swollen (caudiciform) and somewhat conical in shape, and can reach a diameter of up to 50 cm at breast height, at a height of ten metres. There can be spines on the swollen trunk. The wood is spongy and extremely lightweight, it is often mistakenly called pith, this acts to help the plant stay afloat. As the trees grow larger, their trunks are frequently knocked over, and later curve back towards the sun. Their branches touching the soil or water surface, or submerged underwater, are densely covered in adventitious roots. The trees or saplings can even dislodge and are sometimes found floating as components of a mat of vegetation which covers the waters. The trunk bole just above the waterline also forms a tangle of roots. A group of plants form thick mats due to these roots. The stems are spiny, with pairs of substantial thorns under the base of leaves. The short sharp spines are 2–15 mm long, and nearly always present in this species. Both the trunk and the branches are covered in sticky, glandular, hispid (bristly) hairs, both long and short.

The wood is largely built up of regular layers of palisade-like tracheids with un-lignified cell walls. Isolated vessels are scattered in this mass of tracheids, accompanied by tangentially arranged groups of libriform cells (uncommon, resembling phloem, but very slender and relatively thick-walled). The vascular bundle is very small.

It has a chromosome count of 2n=40.

The leaves are compound. Their petiole and rhachis together measure 4–16 cm long, and both are densely covered with both stiff bristly hairs and shorter pubescence, and also often with short, minute spinelets. The petiolules measure 0.5–1 mm in length. It has peltate stipules which have an erose (irregularly notched) appendage below the point of attachment, 2–4 mm in diameter. These stipules have a lobe on one side only, are velvety in texture, broadly ovate in shape with the upper portion deltoid-ovate and ending in an acute tip, are (7–)10–13 mm in length, (3–)5–6(–9) mm in width, and eventually fall off as the leaf matures. The leaves have 20–40 leaflets which have a single rib or raised vein below. The leaflets are (5–)8–26.5(–30) mm long and 4–10 mm wide, entire, mucronulate, their shape is elliptic and oblong or obovate, with their apex truncate, retuse or slightly emarginate, and their bases where they connect to the rhachis are obliquely rounded (not a mirror image). The leaflets are mostly hairless and coloured blue-green on their upper sides, and somewhat glaucous on the undersides, which are covered in slightly tubercular-based, short, coarsely pubescent hairs, especially along the edges and on the mid-vein on the underside, where the minute hairs are often asperulous (feeling somewhat rough to the touch). The secondary veins on the underside of the leaflets are usually blackish or dark-coloured.

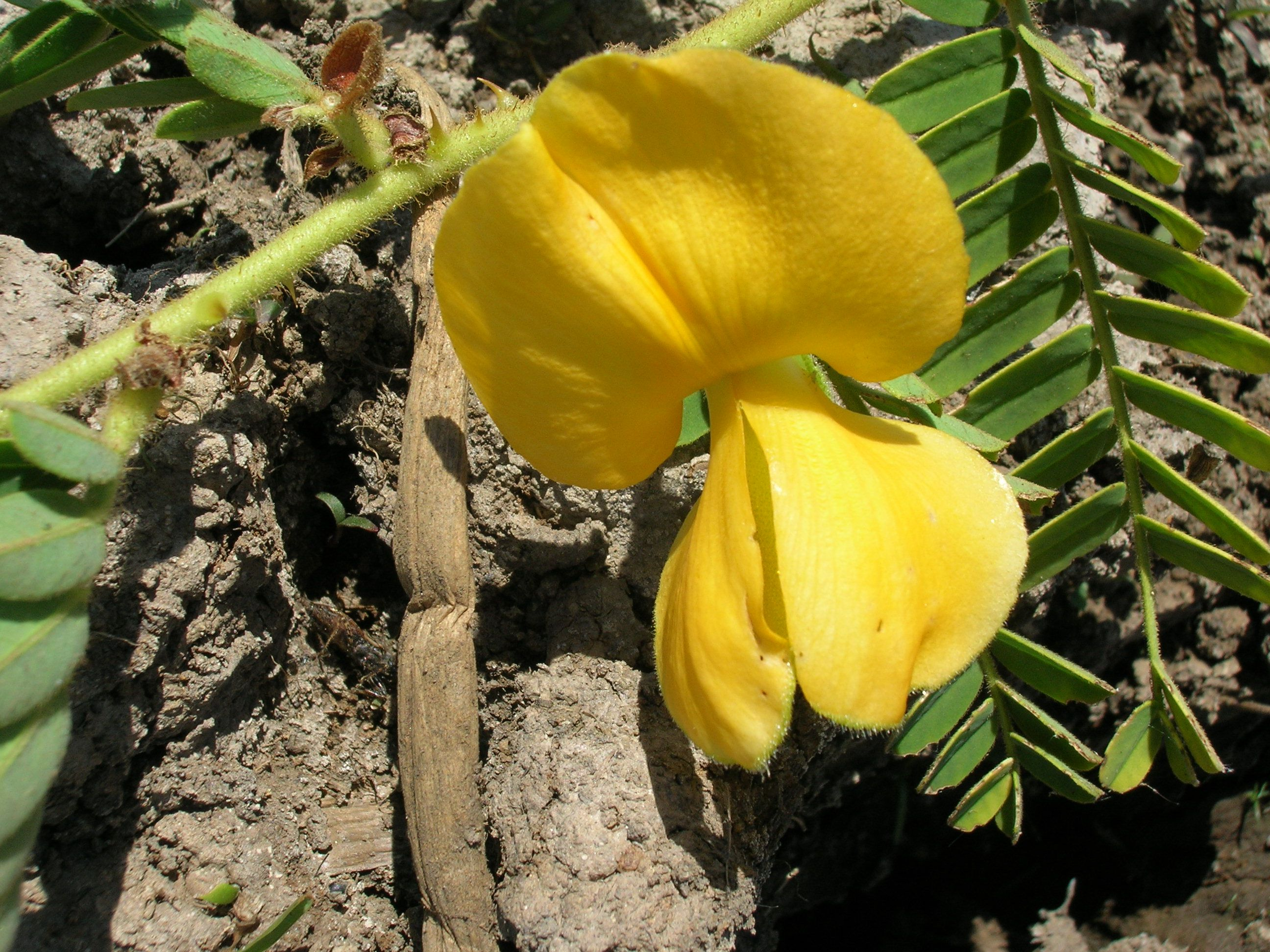
Aeschynomene elaphroxylon flower. Note indumentum and spines on the stem.

The 30–45 mm long, relatively large, beautiful flowers are single or usually bunched together in groups of two to four in an axillary, racemous inflorescences. The inflorescence has ovate bracts which are 6–7 mm long and 3–5 mm wide, as well as bracteoles which are 10–16 mm long and 5–10 mm wide. Both the bracts and bracteoles end with a sharp point, and are pubescent adaxially. These bracteoles are ovate or elliptic, and asymmetrical, in shape, and covered in velvety hairs. The peduncle is 1.3 cm long, the inflorescence rhachis is 1–4.5 cm long and the pedicels are 1.2–1.6 cm long. Both are hispid like the stems. The sticky, green calyx is densely covered in both pubescent and longer, glandular, hispid hairs. The calyx has two lips. These lips are entire or sometimes have two or three teeth at their apex, one lip is ovate-lanceolate in shape, 1.9–2.5 cm long and 0.6–1.2 cm wide, the other lip is ovate-oblong, 1.5–2 cm long and 0.6–1.1 cm wide. All of the petals are somewhat pubescent. The 3–4.7 cm long and wide (sometimes longer than wide), rounded or spatulate standard is yellow to orange; the wings and keel are yellow, or greenish-yellow. The standard is positioned upright, and is emarginate and adaxially puberulous near its apex. The petals of the keel are laciniate along their lower edges where the two petals unite, and pubescent on the adaxial surface. Their blades are falcate, oblique, and about 25–30 mm long and 10–15 mm wide. The keel petals are slightly shorter than the standard, their claws are about 5 mm long. The keel opens at the base for the emergence of the stamens. The glabrous, oblique wings are slightly longer than the standard, 35–40 mm long and 15–20 mm wide; their claws are about 5 mm long. The ten stamens are 28–40 mm long.

The seeds are black or dark purplish-brown, 5–6 mm long, 3–3.8 mm wide, 2 mm thick, and have a slightly eccentric hilum. The seeds are reniform and slightly beaked in shape, the beak resembling the front of a canoe. The seeds are contained in flattened, erect pods that grow in contorted into twisted full or half spirals on the tree. The pods are 10–14 cm long when unrolled, and have 6–17 joints or chambers. They are densely covered in glandular bristly hairs standing on little tubercles, also with short pubescent hairs. There are veins beneath the dense indumentum. The (5–)6–8(–10) mm long and 7–9 mm wide chambers are more or less oblong or trapezoid. The fruit has short stipules.

=== Roots ===
The root system of Ae. elaphroxylon is quite peculiar. As mentioned before, it produces numerous adventitious roots from the trunk and branches, and these roots are strictly separated into two different types, a handful differentiated as strongly growing macrorhizae and the majority being short brachyrhizae. The macrorhizae grow as a mass of long branching roots through the mud and water, the brachyrhizae grow laterally along them in dense rows. These brachyrhizae all look very similar to each other, they do not branch or elongate further, but grow a special bark containing corky inner tangential cell walls. The loose skeleton of macrorhizae roots, relatively restricted in volume, covered by a thick coat of brachyrhizae hanging in the shallow waters and in the waterlogged bottom of lakes are a unique adaptation to the free movement of nutrients in water.

The macrorhizae grow indeterminately in length, split into different branches as they grow, thicken as they age, are 3–5 mm thick at their tips, and light brown in colour. They have no genuine root hairs above the zone of their elongation, and very rarely branch, unless the growing tip hits the soil or is damaged. They may arise from the bole of the tree, but can also occur as big adventitious roots on submersed stems and branches. Unlike mangroves and other swamp trees such as Taxodium distichum, this species does not make specialised pneumatophores, required for gas exchange in the anoxic swamp mud; instead, this species relies upon the adventitious roots which are exposed with drops in water level, and sprout from the lower part of the bole above the water level.

The brachyrhizae are adventitious roots which resemble rust-brown hairs in this species, and conspicuously coat the older lower stems, covering the base of the bole and adjoining root spurs, and also on the underwater roots and in the waterlogged soil. They are all uniform in form: unbranched, of equal thickness (0.5 mm) and of similar length (5 to 10 cm). There are no root hairs, and they can form on roots and stems in any stage of growth. There is no secondary growth: no cambial activity, no periderm formation. Under the thin rhizodermis (root bark) there is a clear one-celled layer of exodermis, with a thickened inner tangential cell wall containing layers of suberin, clothing a thin cortex containing only three parenchymatous layers of cells. Most of the brachyrhizae are connected in the area of lenticels through a single of the bigger medullar rays with a single one of the isolated longitudinal vessel elements scattered in the secondary xylem of the macrorhizae. This small connection does not allow for any subsequent anastomosis with other vessels in the wood and this prevents further growth of the brachyrhizae. Nonetheless, the brachyrhizae are remarkably long-lasting compared to those of most trees (roughly several months to a couple of years). Older brachyrhizae are connected to an inner transverse vessels linking the lateral root with the longitudinal vessel in the mother root, younger ones are linked with one of the outer vessels. Thus some brachyrhizae can be seen to persist for many years. The durability of such simple primary tissues in these roots is thought to be due to the protection offered by a particularly strong exodermis.

Neither forms of roots seem to have endophytic fungi in their cortex. Brachyrhizae also lack signs of epiphytic fungi.

=== Pollen ===
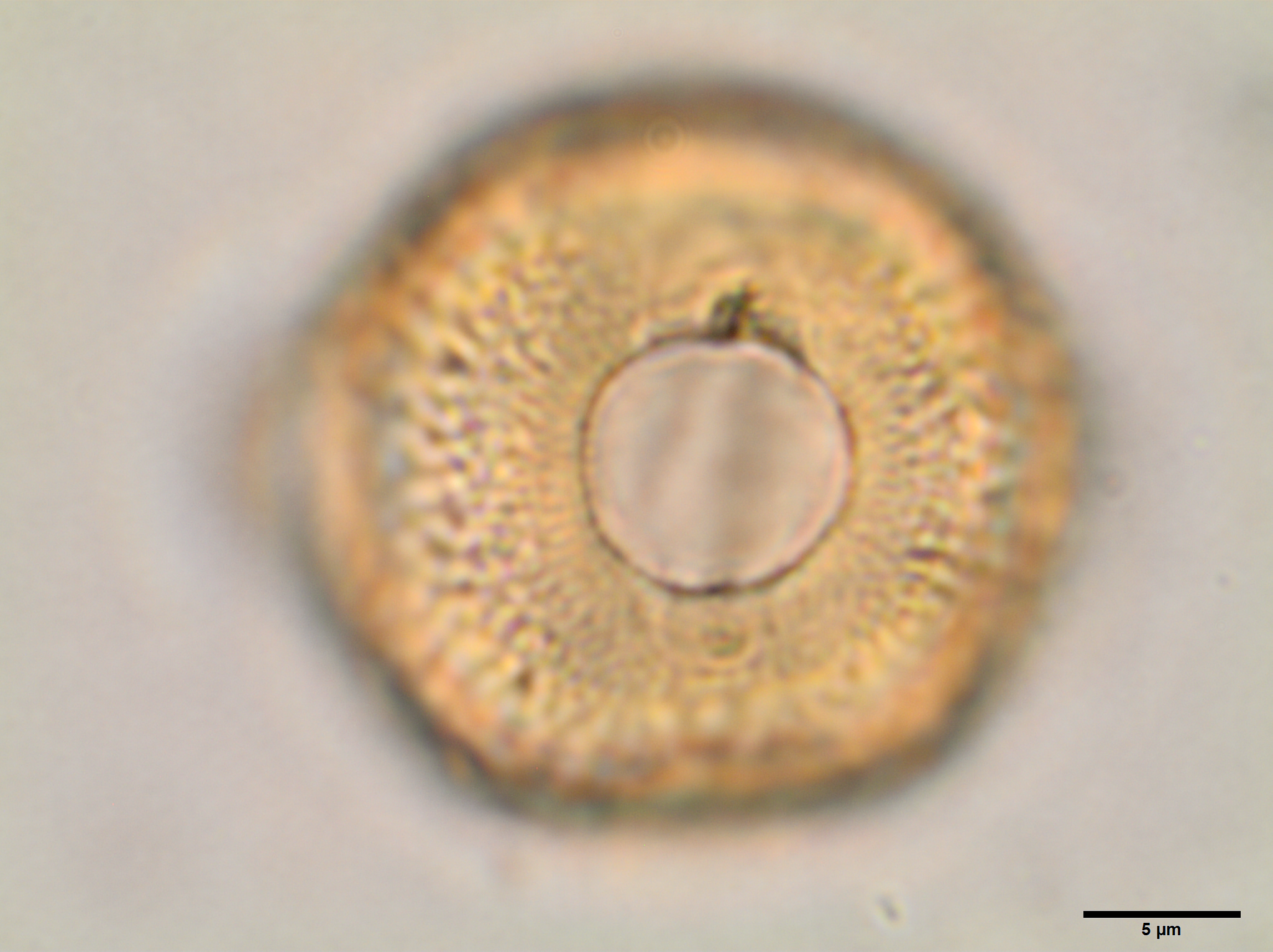
Pollen grains of Aeschynomene elaphroxylon on optical microscope.

Pollen grains are monads, polar axis = (24.0) 27.9 ± 0.4 (30.6) μm x equatorial axis = (26.0) 29.3 ± 0.4 (31.5) μm, oblate spheroial to prolate spheroidal, circular outline in equatorial view; 3-colporate, colpus very long, operculum areolate, membrane psilate, margo psilate-perfurate; endoaperture circular, lalongate to lolongate, sexine heterobrochate, microrreticulate to reticulate, muri straigth, continuoos, lumina polygonal, sexine de 1.6 a 2.7 times ticker than nexine.

=== Similar species ===
In a key to the seven species of Aeschynomene in Malaysia, Ae. elaphroxylon is easily recognised among similar aquatic species by being conspicuously thorny, as opposed to glabrous or only hispid, and having strongly curved or contorted bean pods. Similar species are Ae. aspera, Ae. indica, Ae. uniflora and Ae. elegans.

== Taxonomy ==
The holotype, which is kept in Paris, was collected by George Samuel Perrottet in northwestern Senegal on a small island in the lake of "N'Gher, or Panié-Foul" at the mouth of the "Marigot de Taoué River". It was first described as Herminiera elaphroxylon by Perrottet and Jean Baptiste Antoine Guillemin in 1830–1833, who mention that the natives knew the plant by the name bilor or billeur, and that Michel Adanson had already written about it under that name growing on a floating island in his book about his time in Senegal, Voyage au Sénégal. It was moved to the subgenus Ochopodium in the genus Aeschynomene by Paul Hermann Wilhelm Taubert in 1894 in the book series Die Natürlichen Pflanzenfamilien.

Smithia grandidieri, collected by Alfred Grandidier on the southwest coast of Madagascar and thence described in 1883, was synonymised with Aeschynomene elaphroxylon in 1971.

It is placed in the Tribe Dalbergieae.

== Distribution and habitat ==
Aeschynomene elaphroxylon is indigenous to most of tropical Africa, and is also found in Madagascar, where it was possibly naturalized. In Madagascar it is found in Mahajanga and Toamasina Provinces, and grows in dense stands along the shoreline of Lake Alaotra. It occurs southwards to northern Mozambique, southern Malawi, northern Zimbabwe to Angola.

In Ethiopia the species can be found in the Nechisar National Park.

It appears to have naturalised at Lake Okeechobee, Florida.

== Ecology ==
Aeschynomene elaphroxylon grows by or in water and in waterlogged soils in swamps, lakes and along rivers, typically growing in one to two metre deep of standing water. It is only found in freshwater; it can be seen as a freshwater mangrove. The dense tangle of roots are adapted to supporting the tree when the water subsides, in areas where there are fluctuating water levels over the course of the year. It will occur in dense monospecific stands. It sometimes grows in large floating mats of trees or on floating islands. It occurs in dry and subhumid climates. It is extremely fast-growing, and often grows in stands which can rapidly colonise rivers and swamps. Throughout its entire African range, it has been registered at altitudes of 70–1,850 metres. It is found at 520–1,350m in altitude in East Africa, 470–1,060m in the Zambezi region, or very roughly 500–1,499m in Madagascar.

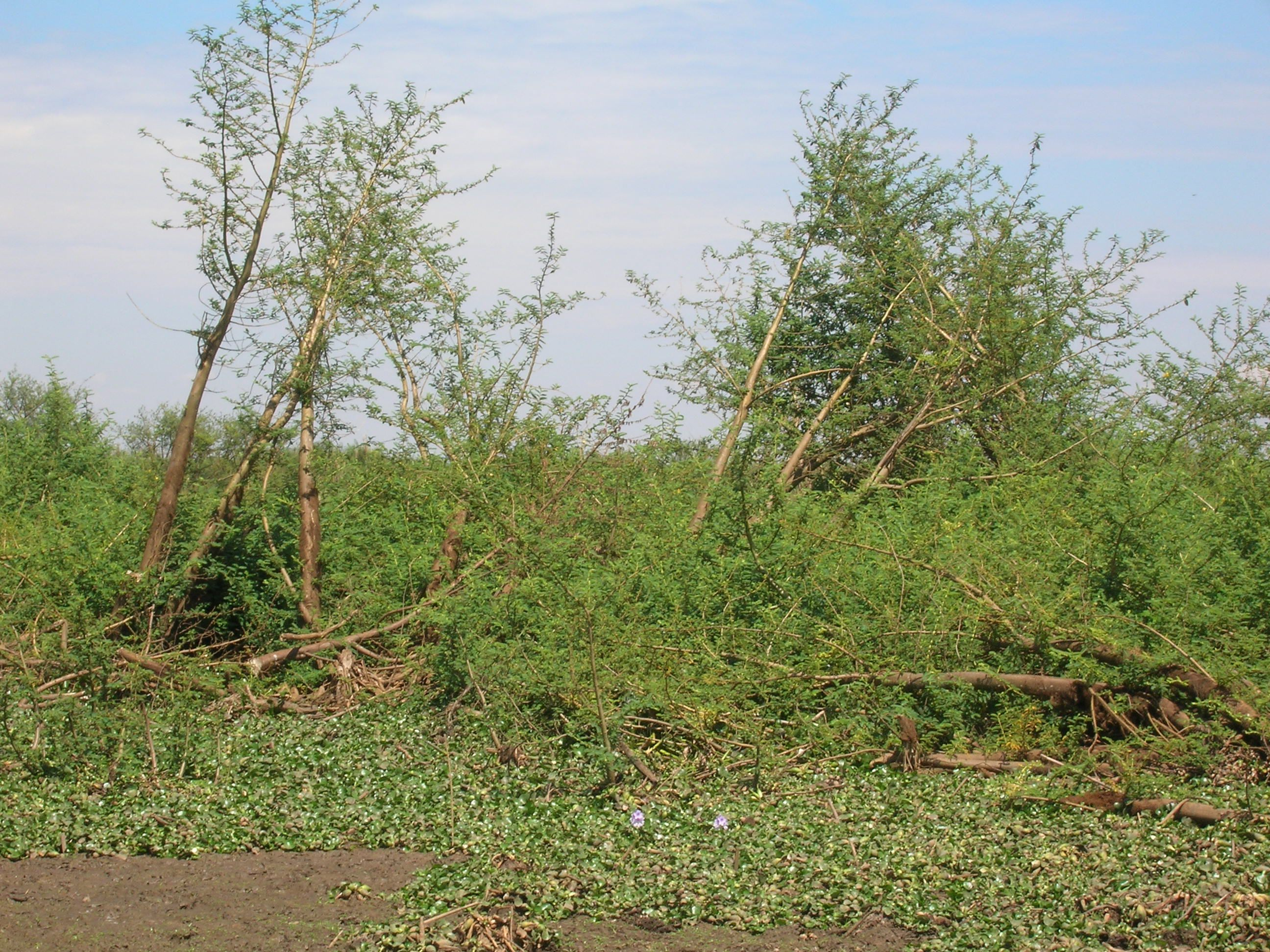
A large dense monospecific stand of small 4-5m trees of Aeschynomene elaphroxylon, some knocked over, with swollen trunks, along the shoreline of Lake Alaotra, near Andrebagara at 756m in Ambatondrazaka District, Madagascar.

In Mangochi District in southern Malawi, it is found growing along the lake shores and in seasonally flooded areas associated with the shrubs Aeschynomene afraspera, Ae. cristata, Sesbania sesban, S. sericea and S. rostrata, and the grasses Eriochloa borumensis, Panicum repens, Phragmites mauritianus and Vossia cuspidata.

In the lagoons and extensive swamps of the Volta Delta in southern Ghana it is the dominant plant growing in floating mats and islands together with two other frequent woody plants, Ficus congensis and Alchornea cordifolia. The ambatch tree is associated with the fern Cyclosorus striatus here, as well as the grasses Leersia hexandra and African wild rice Oryza barthii, the curcubit vine Zehneria capilacea and the herbs Ipomoea aquatica, Pentodon pentandrus and Polygonum tomentosum. It also often forms thickets which cover large stretches of banks and shallow waters.

Flooded areas are not the only places where it can grow, a study of the phytosociology on the islands of Lake Ziway, an Ethiopian Rift Valley lake, identified a common plant community dominated by Ae. elaphroxylon and Sesbania sesban, with Euphorbia tirucalli and Acacia tortilis as co-dominant species, and characterised by the presence of Withania somnifera. This community occurred at an altitude of 1,673m and slope of 5%. The vegetation along the shores of Lake Ziway is composed of bulrush (Paspalidium geminatum), papyrus (Cyperus papyrus), blue water lily (Nymphaea nouchali) and Ae. elaphroxylon. In Arsi Negele (woreda) in Oromia region in southeastern Ethiopia, where it is called boboffee, it occurs in Kimphe Lafa forest, a remnant of dry afromontane forest. It also occurs in the Gughe-Amaro Mountains in the southwest Ethiopian highlands.

In a historical study of how different plant species have reacted to differing water levels in Lake Okeechobee, Florida, Ae. elaphroxylon was found to grow after the native aquatic plants which emerge from the water were killed off as a result of an extended decline in water level (a future scenario considered relatively unlikely). Conversely, very low water on a regular basis or consistent high water levels would both likely favour expansion of other plant species.

Seed dispersal is achieved by wind and water. The seeds of Ae. elaphroxylon have been known to stay viable after being buried for a few years in the waterlogged banks where it grows. The seeds are specifically preyed upon by the larvae of the seed weevil Bruchidius kiliwaensis, which has not been found in any other species as of 2008. The leaf-defoliating sesbania beetle, Mesoplatys ochroptera, earlier said to feed on Aeschynomene, was found not to do so in the wild. The sap-sucking shield bug Brachyplatys testudonigro, which is common in Malawi, likely does feed upon it, as it has regularly found on other Aeschynomene and many other similar legumes like Crotalaria, Indigofera and Tephrosia.

The bark is attacked by Phomopsis herminierae, a type of Coelomycetes fungus.

=== Nitrogen fixing bacteria ===
In 1969 Czechoslovak botanists Jan Jeník and Jarmila Kubíková published their discovery of a new type of bacteroidal nodule which they had observed on the aboveground parts of the stems in Ghana. Although the German botanist H. Klehbahn had stated in 1891 that he had seen root nodules in cultivated plants from Egypt, Jeník and Kubíková found no genuine nodules in the roots of plants in Ghana, instead, they found "numerous hemispherical protuberances" on the bark of the stems and the bases of the roots where close to the water surface. A concentration of Gram positive pleomorphic rod-shaped bacteria very different than the symbiotic rhizobia normally living within legumes were found in these structures.

The tree has nodules in its stems instead of its roots, which host nitrogen fixing, photosynthetic strains of Bradyrhizobium.

Ae. elaphroxylon is only nodulated on their roots by non-photosynthetic and weakly specific Bradyrhizobia.

== Uses ==
Although it is sometimes seen as a weed, the conical poles are also harvested for various purposes. The spongy wood, often mistakenly termed pith, is lighter than cork, yet very resistant to rot. Unlike pith, it contains thick tree rings. It is extremely lightweight and soft. The trunk wood is traditionally used to make floats for fishing nets, and used in raft, canoe and boat construction, for example around Lake Chad. The trunks were cut in 30 cm long sections for use as net floats in coastal Senegal already in the 1820s. At least in the 1950s, sandals were manufactured from the wood in Ghana, as well as screens for blocking the sun. Some French entomologists also used thin slices of the wood as a base in which to pin their specimens in the early 1800s.

On the remote Lake Keilack in South Kordofan, much visited by nomads with their cattle, three bundles of trunks are bound together to make a small rafts propelled using a long pole like a punt. It is sometimes seen as a nuisance in Lake Chad, as the rapidly growing stands are so very densely matted with interlocking roots, they can make it very difficult to fish. Wildlife proliferates protected in the stands. Ae. elaphroxylon is locally called bofoffe by the Zay people who live on islands as well as shore areas of Lake Ziway in the Ethiopian Rift Valley. Bofoffe is used here for making raft boats and stools.

Ae. elaphroxylon of Lake Ziway was found to bioaccumulate a high concentration of the trace element manganese (1.6 × 103mg per kg of dry weight). Nonetheless, among the ten plants studied, it was not considered the best bioindicator of pollution.

Pollen or phytoliths of this species found in drill cores of lake sediments can be used to track the presence of past lakes and fluctuations in lake-levels and climates in Africa.

== Cultivation ==
Of all the aquatic Aeschynomene species, especially Ae. elaphroxylon is larger-flowered, and has therefore been planted as an ornamental plant in some areas.

It has been cultivated in Malaysia, Sri Lanka, and South America. It has also been grown as an ornamental plant in Bogor on Java, at least in the 1950s or earlier. It is said to be cultivated in Egypt, as it was said to be studied in the Nile in 1891 by Klehbahn during the British military occupation of the country. In actually, Klehbahn was sent specimens of the plant by the explorer Georg August Schweinfurth, who was in Cairo at the time and related that a number of fine specimens were grown there in a small basin in the botanical garden of the medical school, in such a luxuriant state as he had not seen during his travels in the upper Nile and beyond. The plant was also grown in the botanical garden in Berlin in the 1880s, but this accession died despite the best efforts of Ignatz Urban; cuttings from Schweinfurth were later grown here.

Based on the description as related by Schweinfurth, it would appear that the plants in cultivation, in Egypt at least, grew differently than those in the wild, as the plants lacked the aerial roots described by earlier writers and seen by him elsewhere in Africa, although we can assume that Schweinfurth observed the brachyrhizae, from his description of "filzartiges Geflecht" of roots.

In Brazil, it has been cultivated in the Jardim Botânico do Rio de Janeiro since 1915, collected in Africa. It was grown in the "dry arboretum" at "Lago do Frei Leandro" (the pond with the Victoria lilies) in the 1980s. It has been grown in the Jardim Botânico de São Paulo since 1941.
