= Leohumicola levissima =

Scientific classification
- Kingdom: Fungi
- Division: Ascomycota
- Class: Leotiomycetes
- Genus: Leohumicola
- Species: L. levissima

Binomial name
- Leohumicola levissima Nguyen & Seifert (2008)

Species of fungus

Leohumicola levissima is a species of fungus. It is named after the smooth walled appearance of its terminal conidial cells (levissima is Latin for "smooth"). It was first found in Crater Lake National Park, Oregon. The terminal cell of this species’ conidia remains smooth even after 3 months’ time, as opposed to the encrusted terminal cells of L. verrucosa and L. incrustata. Conidia of L. atra have similarly smooth terminal cells, but which are darker.

== Description ==
Its conidiogenous hyphae are hyaline, measuring approximately 1–2 μm wide, often found in fascicles in aerial mycelium. These are reduced to a single denticle that is 0.5–1.5 μm long and 1.0–3.5 μm wide. Conidia are two-celled, either solitary or distributed side by side in clusters. Its terminal cell is 4.5–6.0 by 4.0–5.5 μm, being globose to subglobose, transitioning to a dark brown colour; its conidial walls are slightly thick. Chlamydospores are sparsely produced, being intercalary, single, and the same colour as the conidial terminal cell. The vegetative mycelium often carry swollen, monilioid hyphae that are 1 to 2 μm wide, septate, and show thickened walls.
