= Leohumicola verrucosa =

Scientific classification
- Kingdom: Fungi
- Division: Ascomycota
- Class: Leotiomycetes
- Genus: Leohumicola
- Species: L. verrucosa

Binomial name
- Leohumicola verrucosa Hambleton, Nickerson & Seifert (2005)

Species of fungus

Leohumicola verrucosa is a heat-resistant, endophytic, ericoid mycorrhizal soil fungus. Its species name refers to rough, warty or spine-like ornamentations on its aleurioconidia. L. verrucosa was first described from samples of soil exposed to fire; among these it was especially abundant in regularly burned blueberry fields in eastern Canada. L. verrucosa forms mycorrhizal relationships with a wide variety and distribution of species in the Ericaceae family.

== Description and morphology ==
The sexual structures of L. verrucosa have not been seen or studied; instead, this species is identified by the mature morphology and development of its asexual aleurioconidia, as well as genetic data.

The aleurioconidia of L. verrucosa have a basal and terminal cell connected by a small pore; this is a characteristic shared by all described members of the genus Leohumicola. Oftentimes in their initial stages of development, aleurioconidia are simply clear, cylindrical extensions of conidiogenous hyphae. Later in development, a septum develops between the aleurioconidia and the conidiogenous hypha. As the terminal aleurioconidial cell swells, it takes on a dark-brown color. Its cell walls sometimes remain smooth and slightly thicken, but more often they become roughened with the wart or spine-like projections characteristic of this species, with the projections concentrated near the top of the terminal aleurioconidial cell. The basal cell remains clear or takes on a pale brown color as it swells. When development of the aleurioconidia is complete, it is released from the conidiogenous hypha on which it was formed by rhexolytic secession; the ruptured basal cell remains attached to the dispersed terminal cell.

The conidiogenous hyphae, often forming in the aerial mycelium of the colony, display a range of forms.

Most commonly, they develop sympodial proliferations, producing up to five clusters of denticles. They may also form once- or twice-branched conidiophore-like structures, or develop as single denticles.

The mycelium of L. verrucosa colonies can be greyish yellow, olive yellow, or gray, and colonies produce red, reddish brown, or olive brown soluble pigments.

Leohumicola verrucosa forms endophytic hyphal coils in rhizodermal cells of the fine roots of Vaccinium virgatum. These endophytic hyphae tend to be looser in living host cells and denser in non-living host cells, a pattern that is consistent with other ericoid mycorrhizal fungi. L. verrucosa also forms hyphae between, within, and outside of rhizodermal cells.

== Taxonomy ==
Leohumicola verrucosa was described in 2005 by Nickerson et al., alongside three other Leohumicola species and the genus itself in Hambleton et al. 2005. Its species name references

its characteristically verrucose aleurioconidia. It was first isolated from soil samples in Nova Scotia, Canada; Alberta, Canada; and Puerto Rico. Nearly all of the soil samples from which this fungi were initially isolated and described were previously exposed to fire. This species does not have any synonyms, nor has its classification changed since its description in 2005.

Leohumicola verrucosa is the type species of the genus Leohumicola. All members of the Leohumicola genus produce two-celled aleurioconidia, grow slowly, and only sporulate sparsely, if at all.

Other described members of this genus include:

- Leohumicola atra
- Leohumicola incrustata
- Leohumicola levissima
- Leohumicola lenta
- Leohumicola minima
- Leohumicola terminalis

Phylogenetic analyses of nuclear DNA sequences encoding the SSU and ITS ribosomal genes also grouped some undescribed GenBank sequences in this monophyletic genus. The Cox1 gene has since been sequenced for Leohumicola. Phylogenetic analyses place the monophyletic Leohumicola genus in the class Leotiomycetes. Its closest relatives in this class are other soil and root-associated fungi.

== Distribution, habitat, and ecology ==
Leohumicola verrucosa was first described from soil sampled in Canada and Puerto Rico. The distance between these initial sites led the researchers who described this species to propose that it may have a broad distribution. Indeed, since its description, L. verrucosa has been isolated from Rhododendron molle roots and soil on Mt. Nekodake, Japan; Vaccinium myrtillus roots in boreal forest in northern Sweden; forest floor soil in a wet sclerophyll forest near Geeveston, Tasmania, Australia; soil from remnant temperate grassland near Melbourne, Australia; and soil samples from the Andes mountain range in Argentina, among other sites. Two characteristics that are common among many of these sampling localities are the presence of plants in the Ericaceae family, and/or the recent exposure of the soil to heat via fire.

Leohumicola verrucosa has been isolated at elevations as low as approximately sea level and as high as 3,000 meters, and from a range of habitats with widely varying soil compositions and plant communities, including forests, grasslands, commercial agricultural fields, and even coastal dunes. As a thermo-tolerant ericoid mycorrhizal soil fungus, L. verrucosa has a particular advantage in colonizing regularly burned plant communities in which the Ericaceae family is represented by at least one species. We do not yet understand the mechanism of heat resistance in L. verrucosa.

The status of L. verrucosa as an ericoid mycorrhizal fungus is still considered putative by some, though observations of intracellular hyphal coils in Ericaceae root cells, records of associations with a wide variety of Ericaceae plants in situ, and evidence of L. verrucosa's ability to readily colonize Ericaceae roots, especially after heat treatment of soil, all provide support for the role of this species as an endophytic, ericoid mycorrhizal fungus. Research demonstrates that the mycorrhizal symbioses between L. verrucosa and Ericaceae plants may be mutualistic. For example, Vaccinium myrtilloides and Ledum groenlandicum individuals grown in heated soil colonized by L. verrucosa had higher root and shoot biomass than individuals grown in unheated, sterile soil. Another study demonstrated that, when colonized by ericoid mycorrhizal fungi including L. verrucosa, the plant species Calluna vulgaris and Rhododendron hirstum had a decreased rate of pathogenic fungal infection as compared to treatments not colonized by ericoid mycorrhizal fungi.

== Uses ==
Although L. verrucosa does not directly provide food or economic value to humans, it has been shown to form mutualistic mycorrhizal relationships with plants that do, including lingonberries and various species of agriculturally-important blueberries. L. verrucosa also forms mutualistic mycorrhizal relationships with Ledum groenlandicum, an ericoid species with cultural, nutritional, and/or medicinal importance to many of the indigenous peoples of North America, including the Ojibwe, Potawatomi, Cree, and Mi'kmaq; many Inuit groups; and nearly all of the indigenous peoples who originally inhabited the land we call British Columbia, Canada.

Further research on the compounds produced by L. verrucosa may yet reveal that they are of medical value to humans. Phenolic compounds produced by the closely related Leohumicola incrustata, were shown to be effective in inhibiting the growth of two strains of gram-negative bacteria, and one proposed explanation for L. verrucosa's own role in inhibiting pathogenic fungal colonization of ericoid roots is that it has an antibiotic mechanism which may be of interest to human medicine.

Soil fungi, and especially mycorrhizal fungi that form mutualistic symbioses with native plant species, are important components of ecological restoration projects. The isolation of L. verrucosa in remnant temperate grasslands of Australia supports its role in the health and diversity of this conserved ecosystem's microbiome. The mutualistic mycorrhizal relationship between L. verrucosa and the naive plant species Vaccinum myrtilloides and Ledum groenlandicum has identified it as a candidate of interest for assisting these plant species in revegetating an oil sand mine in Alberta, Canada that was once boreal forest.
