= Rochea =

Rochea is the name of two genera of plants and may refer to:

- Rochea Scopoli 1777, a synonym of Aeschynomene.
- Rochea DC. 1802, a synonym of Crassula.
