= Deer vetch =

Deer vetch is a common name for several leguminous plants and may refer to certain species in the following genera:

- Acmispon
- Aeschynomene
- Lotus
