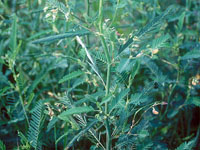

Conservation status
- Imperiled (NatureServe)

- Threatened (ESA)

Scientific classification
- Kingdom: Plantae
- Clade: Tracheophytes
- Clade: Angiosperms
- Clade: Eudicots
- Clade: Rosids
- Order: Fabales
- Family: Fabaceae
- Subfamily: Faboideae
- Genus: Aeschynomene
- Species: A. virginica

Binomial name
- Aeschynomene virginica (L.) Britton, Poggenb. & Sterns

= Aeschynomene virginica =

Species of legume

Aeschynomene virginica is a rare species of flowering plant in the legume family known by the common names Virginia jointvetch and sensitive jointvetch. It is native to a small section of the East Coast of the United States, where it has a fluctuating annual global population scattered in about 20 mostly small occurrences. Counts and estimates revealed two populations in New Jersey including several thousand individuals, one population of a few hundred plants in Maryland, several variable and unstable populations in ditches in North Carolina, and several populations including about 5000 individuals in Virginia. Habitat alteration has reduced the number of sites where the plant can grow. The plant became a federally listed threatened species of the United States in 1992.

Some confusion has occurred in the literature, specifically that this species is named as a noxious weed of soybean and rice fields. The weedy species in question is actually Aeschynomene indica, not the rare and threatened A. virginica.

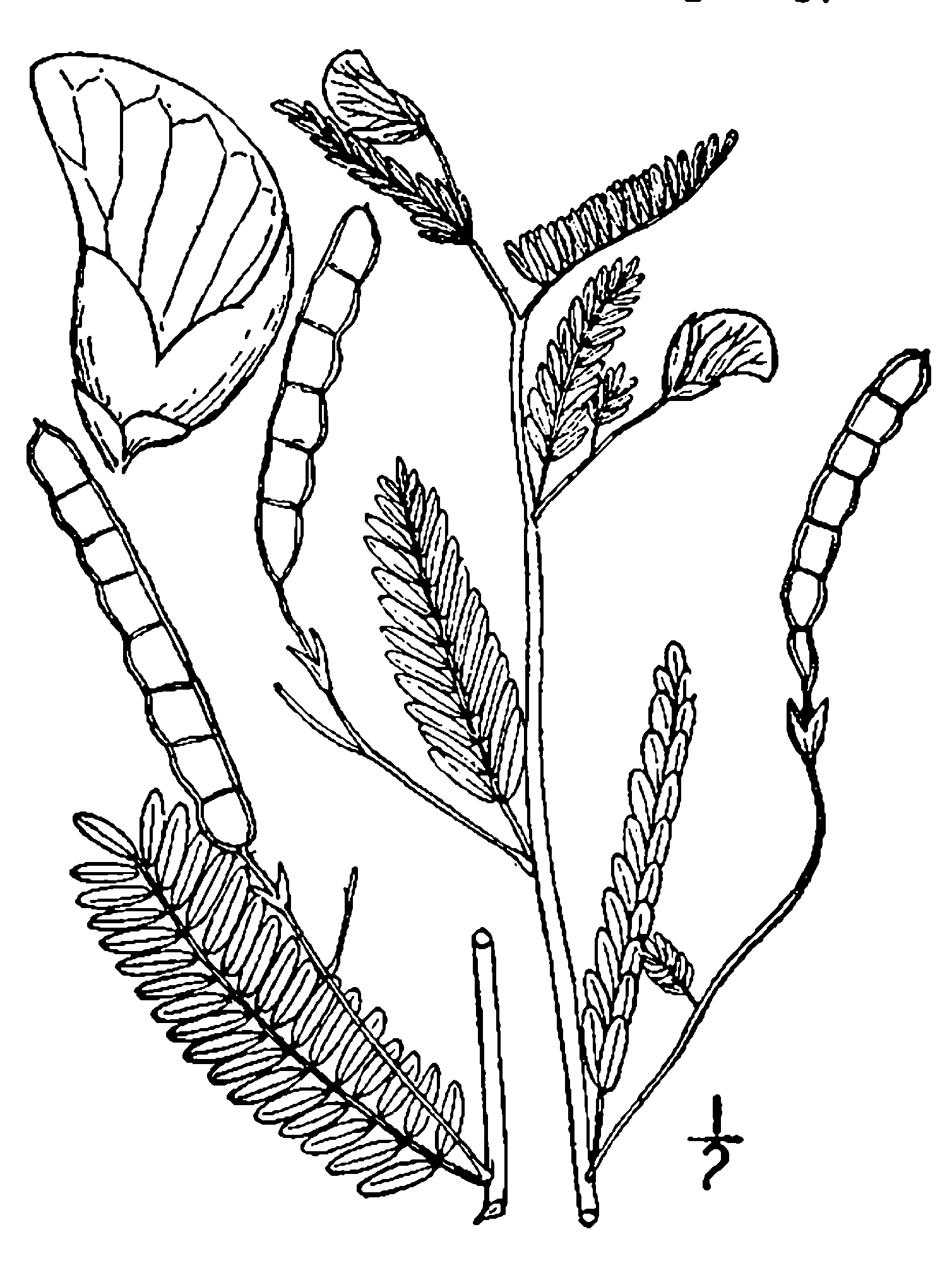
Aeschynomene virginica

A. virginica is an annual herb which grows erect and can reach two meters in height. The alternately arranged leaves are each made up of many pairs of hairy, glandular leaflets. The leaves are touch-sensitive, folding when touched. Blooming takes place in summer and early fall. The pea-like flower is about a centimeter long and yellow in color with stark red veining. The flowers are pollinated by insects such as the least skipper (Ancylozypha numitor) and leaf-cutter bees (family Megachilidae). The fruit is a legume pod up to 7 centimeters long which is narrowed between the seeds and easily segments. The segments float and the seeds may be dispersed on the water if they don't fall out immediately. Bits of the pods may get caught up in floating vegetation debris and can be deposited with it in new territory.

This plant occurs in freshwater tidal marshes that experience tidal action but low salinity. It grows in bare, disturbed areas that are mostly cleared of other vegetation, such as newly deposited shorelines or recently disturbed terrain dug out by muskrats. It germinates in wet soils but not in submerged areas, and it is not successful in areas with thick vegetation. Despite its ability to take hold in tidally disturbed habitat it cannot withstand severe disturbance, such as patterns of increased sedimentation, and human activity such as development, pollution, or erosion from boat wakes.
