= Ctenodon =

Scientific classification
- Kingdom: Plantae
- Clade: Tracheophytes
- Clade: Angiosperms
- Clade: Eudicots
- Clade: Rosids
- Order: Fabales
- Family: Fabaceae
- Genus: Ctenodon; Baill. (1870)

species
- 64; see text

Genus of plants

Ctenodon is a genus of flowering plants in the pea family (Fabaceae). It includes 64 species which range from the southern United States through Mexico, Central America, the Caribbean Islands, and northern South America as far as northeastern Argentina.

== Species ==
64 species are accepted:

- Ctenodon acapulcensis (Rose) A.Delgado
- Ctenodon afranianus D.B.O.S.Cardoso, Filardi & H.C.Lima
- Ctenodon benthamii (Rudd) D.B.O.S.Cardoso, Filardi & H.C.Lima
- Ctenodon bradei (Rudd) D.B.O.S.Cardoso, Filardi & H.C.Lima
- Ctenodon brasilianus (Poir.) D.B.O.S.Cardoso, P.L.R.Moraes & H.C.Lima
- Ctenodon brevipes (Benth.) D.B.O.S.Cardoso, P.L.R.Moraes & H.C.Lima
- Ctenodon carichanicus (Rudd) D.B.O.S.Cardoso & H.C.Lima
- Ctenodon carvalhoi (G.P.Lewis) D.B.O.S.Cardoso, Filardi & H.C.Lima
- Ctenodon chicocesarianus (D.B.O.S.Cardoso & G.Ramos) D.B.O.S.Cardoso
- Ctenodon compactus (Rose) A.Delgado
- Ctenodon egenus (J.F.Macbr.) D.B.O.S.Cardoso & H.C.Lima
- Ctenodon elegans (Schltdl. & Cham.) D.B.O.S.Cardoso & A.Delgado
- Ctenodon falcatus (Poir.) D.B.O.S.Cardoso, P.L.R.Moraes & H.C.Lima
- Ctenodon fascicularis (Schltdl. & Cham.) A.Delgado
- Ctenodon foliolosus (Rudd) D.B.O.S.Cardoso, Filardi & H.C.Lima
- Ctenodon genistoides (Taub.) D.B.O.S.Cardoso, Filardi & H.C.Lima
- Ctenodon gracilis (Vogel) D.B.O.S.Cardoso, P.L.R.Moraes & H.C.Lima
- Ctenodon graminoides (G.P.Lewis) D.B.O.S.Cardoso & H.C.Lima
- Ctenodon hintonii (Sandwith) A.Delgado
- Ctenodon histrix (Poir.) D.B.O.S.Cardoso, P.L.R.Moraes & H.C.Lima
- Ctenodon interruptus (Benth.) D.B.O.S.Cardoso, P.L.R.Moraes & H.C.Lima
- Ctenodon laca-buendianus (Brandão) D.B.O.S.Cardoso, Filardi & H.C.Lima
- Ctenodon langlassei (Micheli ex Rudd) A.Delgado
- Ctenodon leptostachyus (Benth.) D.B.O.S.Cardoso, Filardi & H.C.Lima
- Ctenodon lewisianus (Afr.Fern.) D.B.O.S.Cardoso, Filardi & H.C.Lima
- Ctenodon lorentzianus (Bacigalupo & Vanni) D.B.O.S.Cardoso & H.C.Lima
- Ctenodon lyonnetii (Rudd) A.Delgado
- Ctenodon marginatus (Benth.) D.B.O.S.Cardoso, P.L.R.Moraes & H.C.Lima
- Ctenodon martii (Benth.) D.B.O.S.Cardoso, P.L.R.Moraes & H.C.Lima
- Ctenodon matosii (Afr.Fern.) D.B.O.S.Cardoso, Filardi & H.C.Lima
- Ctenodon molliculus (Kunth) D.B.O.S.Cardoso, Filardi & H.C.Lima
- Ctenodon monteiroi (A.Fern. & P.Bezerra) D.B.O.S.Cardoso, Filardi & H.C.Lima
- Ctenodon mucronulatus (Benth.) A.Delgado
- Ctenodon nanus (Glaz. ex Rudd) D.B.O.S.Cardoso, P.L.R.Moraes & H.C.Lima
- Ctenodon nicaraguensis (Oerst.) A.Delgado
- Ctenodon niveus (Brandegee) A.Delgado
- Ctenodon oroboides (Benth.) D.B.O.S.Cardoso, P.L.R.Moraes & H.C.Lima
- Ctenodon palmeri (Rose) A.Delgado
- Ctenodon paniculatus (Willd. ex Vogel) D.B.O.S.Cardoso, P.L.R.Moraes & H.C.Lima
- Ctenodon paucifoliolatus (Micheli) A.Delgado
- Ctenodon paucifolius (Vogel) D.B.O.S.Cardoso, Filardi & H.C.Lima
- Ctenodon petraeus (B.L.Rob.) A.Delgado
- Ctenodon pinetorus (Brandegee) A.Delgado
- Ctenodon pleuronervius (DC.) D.B.O.S.Cardoso & H.C.Lima
- Ctenodon podocarpus (Vogel) D.B.O.S.Cardoso, Filardi & H.C.Lima
- Ctenodon priscoanus (Afr.Fern.) D.B.O.S.Cardoso, Filardi & H.C.Lima
- Ctenodon racemosus (Vogel) D.B.O.S.Cardoso, Filardi & H.C.Lima
- Ctenodon riedelianus (Taub.) D.B.O.S.Cardoso, Filardi & H.C.Lima
- Ctenodon rosei (C.V.Morton) A.Delgado
- Ctenodon sabulicola (L.P.Queiroz & D.B.O.S.Cardoso) D.B.O.S.Cardoso
- Ctenodon scoparius (Kunth) D.B.O.S.Cardoso & H.C.Lima
- Ctenodon simplicifolius (G.P.Lewis) D.B.O.S.Cardoso & H.C.Lima
- Ctenodon simulans (Rose) A.Delgado
- Ctenodon soniae (G.P.Lewis) D.B.O.S.Cardoso & H.C.Lima
- Ctenodon sousae (Rudd ex A.Delgado & Sotuyo) A.Delgado
- Ctenodon tenuis (Griseb.) D.B.O.S.Cardoso & H.C.Lima
- Ctenodon tumbezensis (J.F.Macbr.) D.B.O.S.Cardoso & H.C.Lima
- Ctenodon veadeiranus (M.J.Silva & L.L.C.Antunes) D.B.O.S.Cardoso & H.C.Lima
- Ctenodon venezolanus (Rudd) D.B.O.S.Cardoso & H.C.Lima
- Ctenodon vigil (Brandegee) A.Delgado
- Ctenodon viscidulus (Michx.) D.B.O.S.Cardoso & A.Delgado
- Ctenodon vogelii (Rudd) D.B.O.S.Cardoso, Filardi & H.C.Lima
- Ctenodon warmingii (Micheli) D.B.O.S.Cardoso, Filardi & H.C.Lima
- Ctenodon weberbaueri (Ulbr.) D.B.O.S.Cardoso & H.C.Lima
