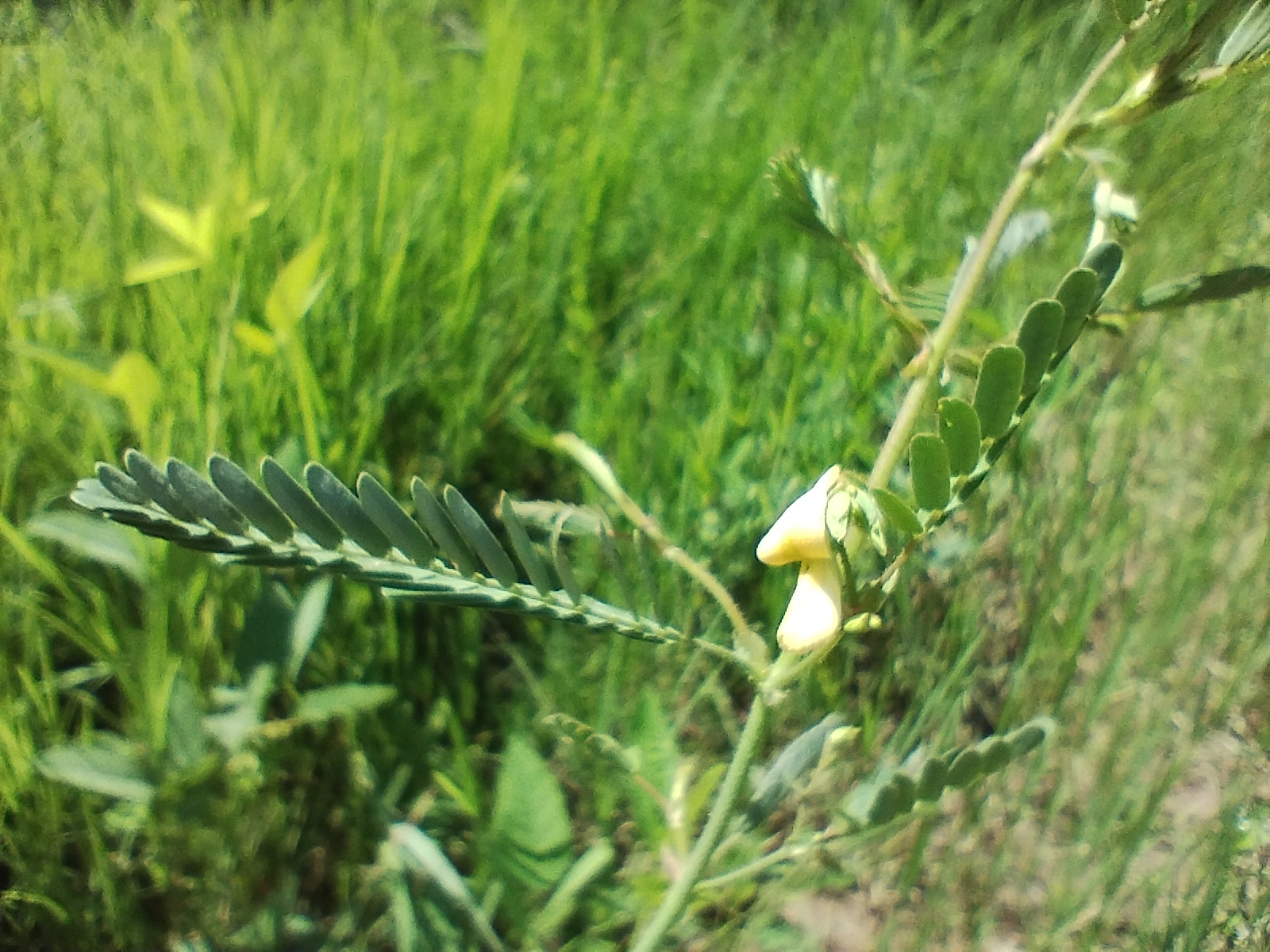

Scientific classification
- Kingdom: Plantae
- Clade: Embryophytes
- Clade: Tracheophytes
- Clade: Angiosperms
- Clade: Eudicots
- Clade: Rosids
- Order: Fabales
- Family: Fabaceae
- Subfamily: Faboideae
- Genus: Aeschynomene
- Species: A. evenia

Binomial name
- Aeschynomene evenia C.Wright

= Aeschynomene evenia =

Species of plant

Aeschynomene evenia is a species of flowering plant in the family Fabaceae. It is a shrub native to the Americas. This species has emerged as a model organism to study rhizobia symbiosis, since it can interact with photosynthetic Bradyrhizobium species that do not produce Nod factors, and the mode of entry of the bacteria into the plant tissues occurs in an intracellular fashion, in contrast to the infection thread formed by other legumes. Its genome has been sequenced and published in 2021.
