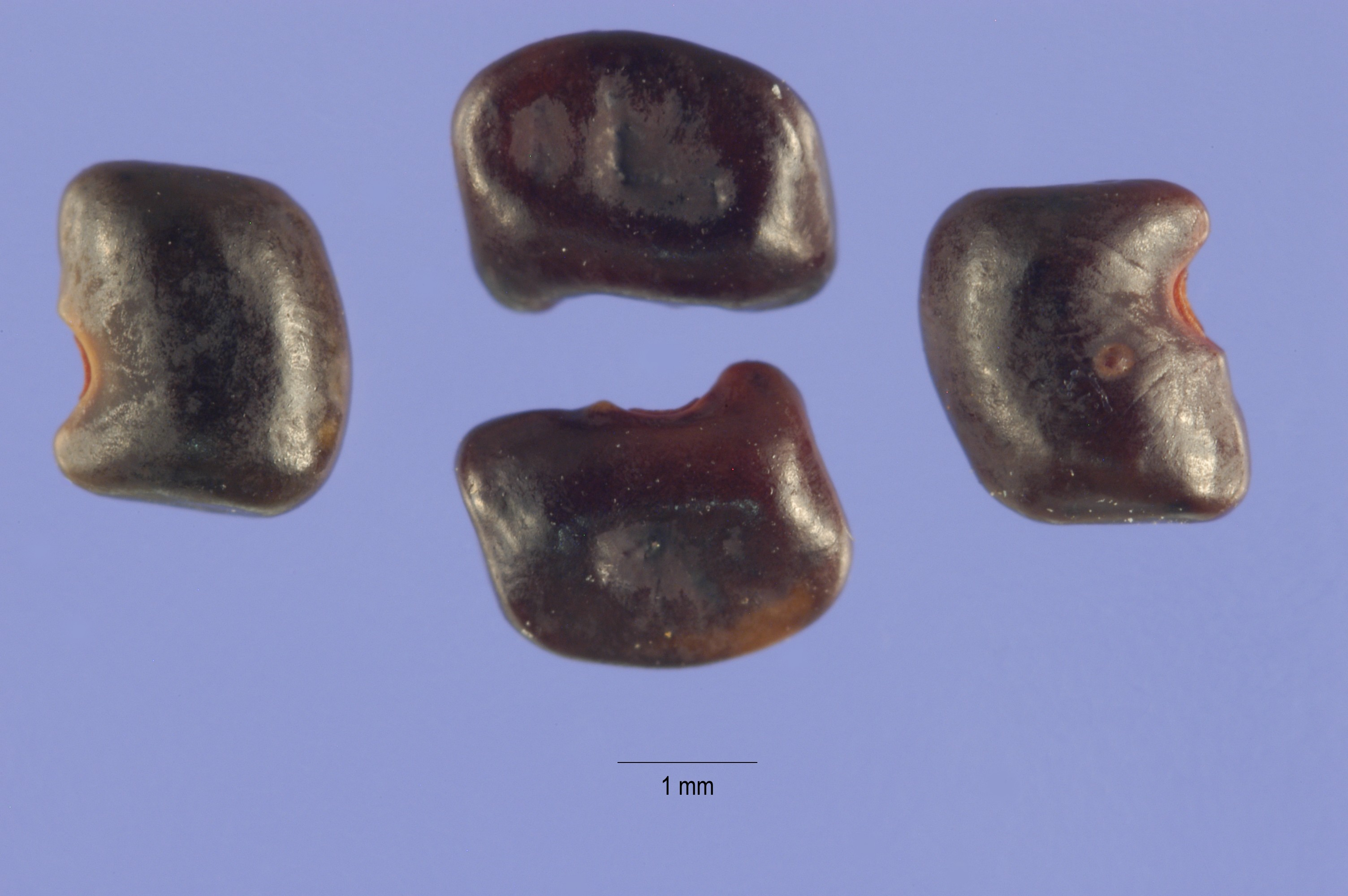
- seeds

Scientific classification
- Kingdom: Plantae
- Clade: Tracheophytes
- Clade: Angiosperms
- Clade: Eudicots
- Clade: Rosids
- Order: Fabales
- Family: Fabaceae
- Subfamily: Faboideae
- Genus: Aeschynomene
- Species: A. rudis

Binomial name
- Aeschynomene rudis Benth.

Synonyms
- Aeschynomene natans

= Aeschynomene rudis =

Species of legume

Aeschynomene rudis is a species of flowering plant in the legume family known by the common name zigzag jointvetch. It is native to South America but it is known from other continents, including North America, as a noxious weed, especially of wet areas such as rice fields. It is aquatic or semi-aquatic, growing bristly, glandular stems near or in water. It grows up to two metres tall. The leaves are composed of oval-shaped leaflets each about a centimetre long. At the base of each leaf are large, flat, pointed stipules. The flower is purple-tinted white and 1 to 1.5 centimetres wide. The fruit is a lobed, gland-dotted legume pod narrowed between the seeds. It is up to 5 centimetres long and less than one wide. As the pod dries it breaks into segments, each segment containing a seed. The hard, shiny seed is kidney-shaped and 2 or 3 millimetres long.
