= Leohumicola =

Scientific classification
- Kingdom: Fungi
- Division: Ascomycota
- Class: Leotiomycetes
- Genus: Leohumicola; N.L. Nickerson, Hambleton & K.A. Seifert, 2005

Species
- Leohumicola atra; Leohumicola incrustata; Leohumicola lenta; Leohumicola levissima; Leohumicola minima; Leohumicola terminalis; Leohumicola verrucosa

Genus of fungus

Leohumicola is a genus of fungi first described in 2005.

The following species are accepted within Leohumicola:

- Leohumicola atra
- Leohumicola incrustata
- Leohumicola lenta
- Leohumicola levissima
- Leohumicola minima
- Leohumicola terminalis
- Leohumicola verrucosa
