= Ctenodon elegans =

Scientific classification
- Kingdom: Plantae
- Clade: Tracheophytes
- Clade: Angiosperms
- Clade: Eudicots
- Clade: Rosids
- Order: Fabales
- Family: Fabaceae
- Genus: Ctenodon
- Species: C. elegans

Binomial name
- Ctenodon elegans (Cham. & Schltdl.) D.B.O.S.Cardoso & A.Delgado (2020)

Subspecies
- Ctenodon elegans var. elegans; Ctenodon elegans var. robustior (Rudd) D.B.O.S.Cardoso, Filardi & H.C.Lima

Synonyms
- Aeschynomene elegans Schltdl. & Cham. (1830); Aeschynomene falcata var. elegans (Cham. & Schltdl.) Kuntze (1891)

Species of legume

Ctenodon elegans is a species of flowering plant in the Fabaceae family. It is endemic to eastern and west-central Brazil.
