= Leohumicola incrustata =

Scientific classification
- Kingdom: Fungi
- Division: Ascomycota
- Class: Leotiomycetes
- Genus: Leohumicola
- Species: L. incrustata

Binomial name
- Leohumicola incrustata Nguyen & Seifert, 2008

Species of fungus

Leohumicola incrustata is a species of fungus. It was named after the appearance of its terminal conidial cells, incrusted with a crust-like slime.

== Distribution and habitation ==
It was first found in the Cape of Good Hope Nature Reserve, from heated soil. Large warts or the production of slime on its terminal cell are this species' defining characteristics. Its conidia are similar to those of L. verrucosa, however in the latter the wall ornamentation forms smaller warts.

== Description ==
Its conidiogenous hyphae are hyaline, measuring approximately 1.5–2.0 μm wide, often found in fascicles in aerial mycelium. These are reduced to a single denticle that is 1.0–3.0 μm long and 1.5–3.5μm wide. Conidia are two-celled, either solitary or distributed side by side in clusters. Its terminal cell is 4.0–5.5 by 4.0–5.0 μm, being globose to subglobose, transitioning to a pale brown to dark brown colour; its conidial walls are slightly thick, smooth or verrucose, with warts measuring 0.75 to 1.5 μm, incrusted with a brown-coloured slime that is 1–2 μm thick around the apex. Its basal cell measures 2.5–4.5 by 2.0–3.0 μm. Chlamydospores are sparsely produced, being intercalary, single, and the same colour as the conidial terminal cell. The vegetative mycelium often carry swollen, monilioid hyphae that are 1.5 to 3 μm wide, septate, and show thickened walls.
