= Leohumicola atra =

Scientific classification
- Kingdom: Fungi
- Division: Ascomycota
- Class: Leotiomycetes
- Genus: Leohumicola
- Species: L. atra

Binomial name
- Leohumicola atra Nguyen & Seifert, 2008

Species of fungus

Leohumicola atra is a species of fungus. It is named after the dark-brown colour of its terminal conidia cells (atra is Latin for "dark"). It was found in Crater Lake National Park, Oregon, from heated soil. This species' conidia terminal cell becomes a darker brown compared to its cogenerate species, being nearly black.

== Description ==
Its conidiogenous hyphae are hyaline, measuring approximately 1–2.5 μm wide, often found in fascicles in aerial mycelium. These are reduced to a single denticle that is 0.5–1.0 μm long and 1.0–2.0 μm wide. Conidia are two-celled, either solitary or distributed side by side in clusters. Its terminal cell is 4.5–5.5 by 4.0–5.5 μm, being globose to subglobose, transitioning to a dark brown colour; its conidial walls are slightly thick. Aleurioconidia are sometimes found as single-celled, with a terminal cell directly attached to the hypha, and with no basal cell. Chlamydospores are sparsely produced, being intercalary, single, and the same colour as the conidial terminal cell. The vegetative mycelium often carry swollen, monilioid hyphae that are 1.5 to 2 μm wide, septate, and show thickened walls.
