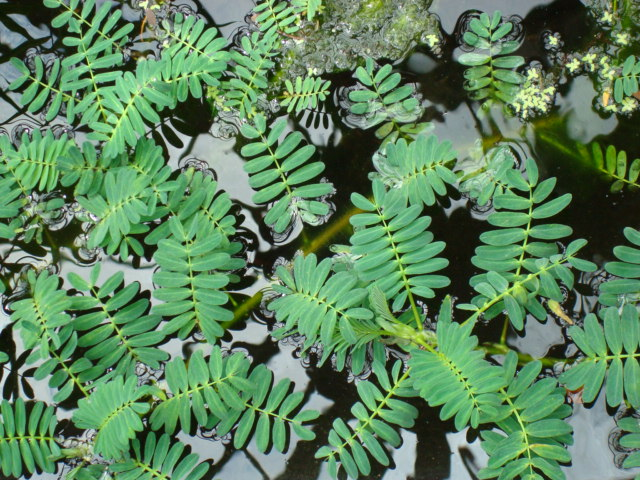
- Aeschynomene fluitans

Scientific classification
- Kingdom: Plantae
- Clade: Tracheophytes
- Clade: Angiosperms
- Clade: Eudicots
- Clade: Rosids
- Order: Fabales
- Family: Fabaceae
- Subfamily: Faboideae
- Tribe: Dalbergieae
- Genus: Aeschynomene; L. (1753)

Species
- 114; see text

Synonyms
- Aedemone Kotschy (1858); Bakerophyton (J.Leonard) Hutch. (1964); Balisaea Taub. (1896); Climacorachis Hemsl. & Rose (1903); Gajati Adans. (1763); Herminiera Guill. & Perr. (1832); Macromiscus Turcz. (1846); Mantodda Adans. (1763); Rochea Scop. (1777), nom. rej.; Rueppelia A.Rich. (1847); Secula Small (1913); Segurola Larrañaga (1927)

= Aeschynomene =

Genus of legumes

Aeschynomene is a genus of flowering plants in the family Fabaceae, and was recently assigned to the informal monophyletic Dalbergia clade of the Dalbergieae. They are known commonly as jointvetches. They range across tropical and subtropical regions of the Americas, sub-Saharan Africa, south, southeast, and east Asia, and Australia. These legumes are most common in warm regions and many species are aquatic.

The genus as currently circumscribed is paraphyletic and it has been suggested that the subgenus Ochopodium be elevated to a new genus within the Dalbergieae, though other changes will also be required to render the genus monophyletic. Plants of the World Online currently accepts 114 species.

== Species ==
Aeschynomene comprises the following species:

- Aeschynomene abyssinica (A. Rich.) Vatke
- Aeschynomene acapulcensis Rose
- Aeschynomene acutangula Baker
- Aeschynomene afraspera J. Léonard
- Aeschynomene americana L.—shyleaf
  - var. americana L.
  - var. flabellata Rudd
  - var. glandulosa (Poir.) Rudd
- Aeschynomene amorphoides (S. Watson) Robinson
- Aeschynomene angolense Rossberg
- Aeschynomene aphylla Wild
- Aeschynomene aspera L.—sola, sola pith plant, laugauni
- Aeschynomene batekensis Troch. & Koechlin
- Aeschynomene baumii Harms
- Aeschynomene bella Harms
- Aeschynomene benguellensis Torre
- Aeschynomene bracteosa Baker
- Aeschynomene bradei Rudd
- Aeschynomene brasiliana (Poir.) DC.
- Aeschynomene brevifolia Poir.
- Aeschynomene brevipes Benth.
- Aeschynomene bullockii J. Léonard
- Aeschynomene burttii Baker f.
- Aeschynomene carvalhoi G.P. Lewis
- Aeschynomene chimanimaniensis Verdc.
- Aeschynomene ciliata Vogel
- Aeschynomene compacta Rose
- Aeschynomene crassicaulis Harms
- Aeschynomene cristata Vatke—Malagasy jointvetch
  - var. cristata Vatke
  - var. pubescens J. León
- Aeschynomene curtisiae Johnston
- Aeschynomene deamii Robinson & Bartlett
- Aeschynomene debilis Baker
- Aeschynomene deightonii Hepper
- Aeschynomene denticulata Rudd
- Aeschynomene dimidiata Baker
- Aeschynomene egena (J.F. Macbr.) Rudd
- Aeschynomene elaphroxylon (Guill. & Perr.) Taub.—ambatch
- Aeschynomene evenia C. Wright—shrubby jointvetch
  - var. evenia C. Wright
  - var. serrulata Rudd
- Aeschynomene falcata (Poir.) DC.—Australian jointvetch
- Aeschynomene fascicularis Cham. & Schltdl.
- Aeschynomene filosa Benth.
- Aeschynomene fluitans Peter
- Aeschynomene fluminensis Vell.
- Aeschynomene foliolosa Rudd
- Aeschynomene fulgida Baker
- Aeschynomene gazensis Baker f.
- Aeschynomene genistoides (Taub.) Rudd
- Aeschynomene glabrescens Baker
- Aeschynomene glauca R.E. Fr.
- Aeschynomene goetzei Harms
- Aeschynomene gracilipes Taub.
- Aeschynomene gracilis Vogel—Puerto Rico jointvetch
- Aeschynomene grandistipulata Harms
- Aeschynomene guatemalensis (Standl. & Steyerm.) Rudd
- Aeschynomene heurckeana Baker
- Aeschynomene hintonii Sandwith
- Aeschynomene histrix Poir.—porcupine jointvetch
  - var. densiflora (Benth.) Rudd
  - var. histrix Poir.
  - var. incana (Vogel) Benth.
- Aeschynomene indica L.—Indian jointvetch
- Aeschynomene interrupta Benth.
- Aeschynomene inyangensis Wild
- Aeschynomene katangensis De Wild.
- Aeschynomene kerstingii Harms
- Aeschynomene langlassei Rudd
- Aeschynomene latericola Verdc.
- Aeschynomene lateritia Harms
- Aeschynomene laxiflora Baker
- Aeschynomene leptophylla Harms
- Aeschynomene leptostachya Benth.
- Aeschynomene lorentziana Bacigalupo & Vanni
- Aeschynomene lyonnetii Rudd
- Aeschynomene magna Rudd
- Aeschynomene marginata Benth.
- Aeschynomene martii Benth.
- Aeschynomene maximistipulata Torre
- Aeschynomene mediocris Verdc.
- Aeschynomene megalophylla Harms
- Aeschynomene micranthos (Poir.) DC.
- Aeschynomene mimosifolia Vatke
- Aeschynomene minutiflora Taub.
- Aeschynomene mollicula Kunth
  - var. breviflora Rudd
  - var. mollicula Kunth
- Aeschynomene monteiroi Alf. Fern. & P. Bezerra
- Aeschynomene montevidensis Vogel
- Aeschynomene mossambicensis Verdc.
- Aeschynomene mossoensis J. Léonard
- Aeschynomene multicaulis Harms
- Aeschynomene nana Rudd
- Aeschynomene neglecta Hepper
- Aeschynomene nematopoda Harms
- Aeschynomene nicaraguensis (Oerst.) Standl.
- Aeschynomene nilotica Taub.
- Aeschynomene nivea Brandegee
- Aeschynomene nodulosa (Baker) Baker f.
  - var. glabrescens J. B. Gillett
  - var. nodulosa (Baker) Baker f.
- Aeschynomene nyassana Taub.
- Aeschynomene nyikensis Baker
- Aeschynomene oligophylla Harms
- Aeschynomene oroboides Benth.
- Aeschynomene palmeri Rose
- Aeschynomene paniculata Willd. ex Vogel—pannicle jointvetch
- Aeschynomene paraguayensis Rudd
- Aeschynomene pararubrofarinacea J. Léonard
- Aeschynomene parviflora Micheli
- Aeschynomene patula Poir.
- Aeschynomene paucifolia Vogel
- Aeschynomene paucifoliolata Micheli
- Aeschynomene petraea Robinson
- Aeschynomene pfundii Taub.
- Aeschynomene pinetorum Brandegee
- Aeschynomene pleuronervia DC.
- Aeschynomene pluriarticulata G. Don
- Aeschynomene podocarpa Vogel
- Aeschynomene portoricensis Urb.
- Aeschynomene pratensis Small—meadow jointvetch
  - var. caribaea Rudd
  - var. pratensis Small
- Aeschynomene pringlei Rose
- Aeschynomene pseudoglabrescens Verdc.
- Aeschynomene pulchella Baker
- Aeschynomene purpusii Brandegee
- Aeschynomene pygmaea Baker
- Aeschynomene racemosa Vogel
- Aeschynomene rehmannii Schinz
  - var. leptobotrya (Harms ex Baker f.) J. B. Gillett
  - var. rehmannii Schinz
- Aeschynomene rhodesiaca Harms
- Aeschynomene riedeliana Taub.
- Aeschynomene rivularis Frapp.
- Aeschynomene rosei C.V. Morton
- Aeschynomene rostrata Benth.
- Aeschynomene rubrofarinacea (Taub.) F. White
- Aeschynomene rubroviolacea J. Léonard
- Aeschynomene rudis Benth.—zigzag jointvetch
- Aeschynomene ruspoliana Harms
- Aeschynomene sansibarica Taub.
- Aeschynomene scabra G. Don
- Aeschynomene schimperi A. Rich.
- Aeschynomene schindleri R. Vig.
- Aeschynomene schliebenii Harms
  - var. mossambicensis (Baker f.) Verdc.
  - var. schliebenii Harms
- Aeschynomene scoparia Kunth
- Aeschynomene selloi Vogel
- Aeschynomene semilunaris Hutch.
- Aeschynomene sensitiva Sw.—sensitive jointvetch
- Aeschynomene siifolia Baker
- Aeschynomene simulans Rose
- Aeschynomene solitariiflora J. Léonard
- Aeschynomene sparsiflora Baker
- Aeschynomene standleyi A.R. Molina
- Aeschynomene stipitata Burtt Davy
- Aeschynomene stipulosa Verdc.
- Aeschynomene stolzii Harms
- Aeschynomene tambacoundensis Berhaut
- Aeschynomene tenuirama Baker
- Aeschynomene tenuis Griseb.
- Aeschynomene trigonocarpa Baker f.
- Aeschynomene tsaratanensis Du Puy & Labat
- Aeschynomene tumbezensis J.F. Macbr.
- Aeschynomene uniflora E. Mey.
- Aeschynomene unijuga (M.E. Jones) Rudd
- Aeschynomene upembensis J. Léonard
- Aeschynomene venulosa Verdc.
- Aeschynomene vigil Brandegee
- Aeschynomene villosa Poir.
  - var. longifolia (Micheli) Rudd
  - var. mexicana (Hemsl. & Rose) Rudd
  - var. villosa Poir.
- Aeschynomene virginica (L.) Britton & al.—Virginia jointvetch
- Aeschynomene viscidula Michx.
- Aeschynomene vogelii Rudd
- Aeschynomene warmingii Micheli
- Aeschynomene weberbaueri Ulbr.

=== Formerly placed here ===
- Ctenodon elegans (as Aeschynomene elegans)
