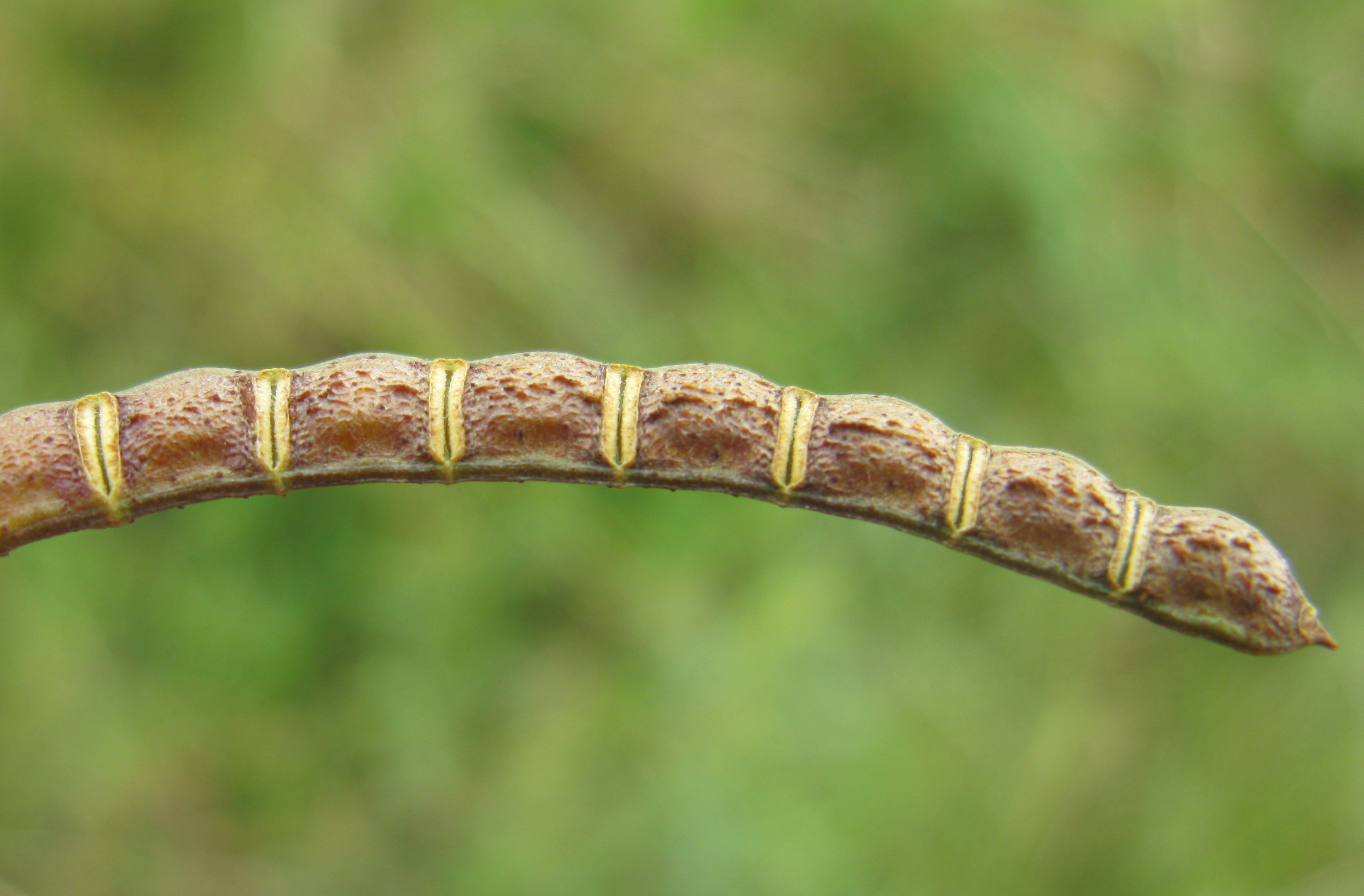
- fruit

Conservation status
- Least Concern (IUCN 3.1)

Scientific classification
- Kingdom: Plantae
- Clade: Tracheophytes
- Clade: Angiosperms
- Clade: Eudicots
- Clade: Rosids
- Order: Fabales
- Family: Fabaceae
- Subfamily: Faboideae
- Genus: Aeschynomene
- Species: A. indica

Binomial name
- Aeschynomene indica L.
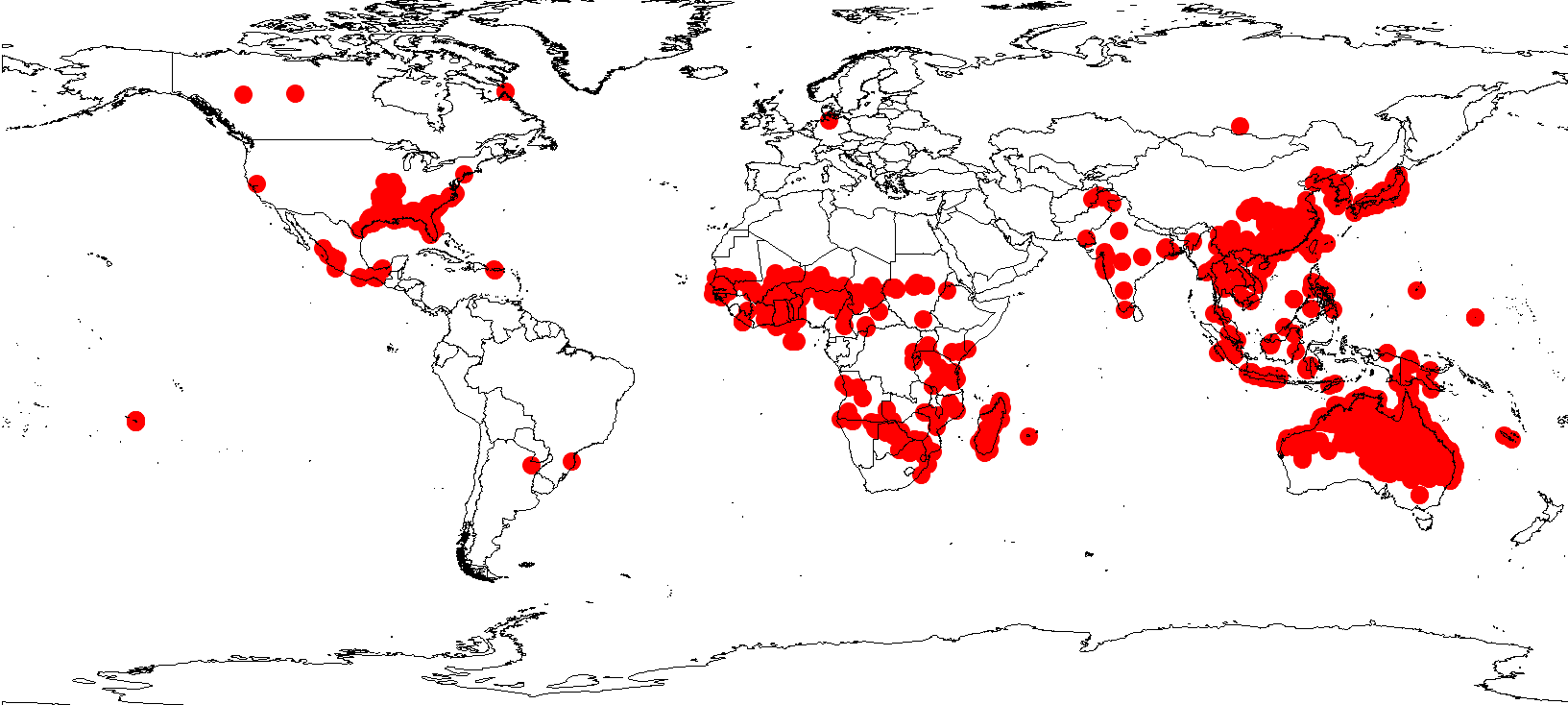
- Occurrence data from GBIF

Synonyms
- Aeschynomene cachemiriana Aeschynomene diffusa Aeschynomene glaberrima Aeschynomene hispida Aeschynomene macropoda Aeschynomene montana Aeschynomene oligantha Aeschynomene pumila Aeschynomene punctata Aeschynomene quadrata Aeschynomene roxburghii Aeschynomene subviscosa Hedysarum alpinum Hedysarum neli-tali Hedysarum virginicum

= Aeschynomene indica =

Species of legume

Aeschynomene indica is a species of flowering plant in the legume family. Common names include Indian jointvetch, kat sola, budda pea, curly indigo, hard sola, northern jointvetch, indische Schampflanze (German), angiquinho, maricazinho, papquinha, pinheirinho (Brazilian Portuguese), he meng (Chinese), kusanemu (Japanese), diya siyambala (Sinhala), and ikin sihk (Pohnpeian).

The true native range of this species is unclear because it is thought to have been introduced so widely, but it probably includes parts of Africa, Asia, Australia, and the southeastern North America. It is likely a naturalized species on many islands of the Pacific, the Caribbean, and the Indian Ocean, including Fiji, the Society Islands, Micronesia, Puerto Rico, Mauritius, and Réunion. It is also introduced in South America.

== Description ==
This species is variable. It is an annual or perennial herb or subshrub growing 30 centimeters to 2.5 meters tall. The stem is usually thin, about half a centimeter wide, but it can grow thick at the base, up to 2.5 centimeters wide. It is spongy or corky, or sometimes hollow and cylindric. It is mostly hairless but sometimes has glandular hairs with tubercular bases. The leaves are up to 10 centimeters long. Each leaf is made up of many narrow, papery leaflets each up to 1.3 centimeters long. Some leaves are sensitive. The spurred stipule is up to 1.5 centimeters long. The inflorescence is made up of 1 to 6 flowers with reddish- or purple-streaked yellow or whitish corollas. The long, narrow legume pod is up to 4.8 centimeters long and is straight or curved, with up to 13 chambers. It contains black or brown kidney-shaped seeds each 2 or 3 millimeters long.

== Habitat ==
The plant often grows in wet, muddy habitat, such as floodplains, swamps, and paddy fields. It is also known from dry land. It has been observed in association with Sesbania spp. and Acacia nilotica ssp. tomentosa. It grows in disturbed habitat, such as roadside ditches, often becoming weedy.

== Biology ==
The plant, like others of its genus, sometimes develops nodes similar to the root nodules of many other legumes, but the nodes grow on the stem in addition to the roots. They contain Bradyrhizobium species, nitrogen-fixing bacteria that can perform photosynthesis. The symbiotic bacterium Blastobacter denitroficans also inhabits the nodes.

This species is susceptible to the plant disease anthracnose caused by the fungus Colletotrichum gloeosporioides.

== Uses ==
This plant is used as green manure. It is not very palatable to animals but it is sometimes given as fodder. It can be toxic, however. The seeds can poison pigs, causing loss of coordination, falls, and death. Examination of the brain tissue of affected animals revealed swelling and hemorrhage.

The pithy stems are used for floating devices, such as rafts and floats for fishing nets. The plant is also used as a spermicide. Its charcoal is made into gunpowder.

The yellow flowers are eaten by people in Cambodia, who call the herb snaô ach' moën (snaô="edible flowers", ach' moën="chicken poo", Khmer language).
