= Rhizodermis =

Root epidermis

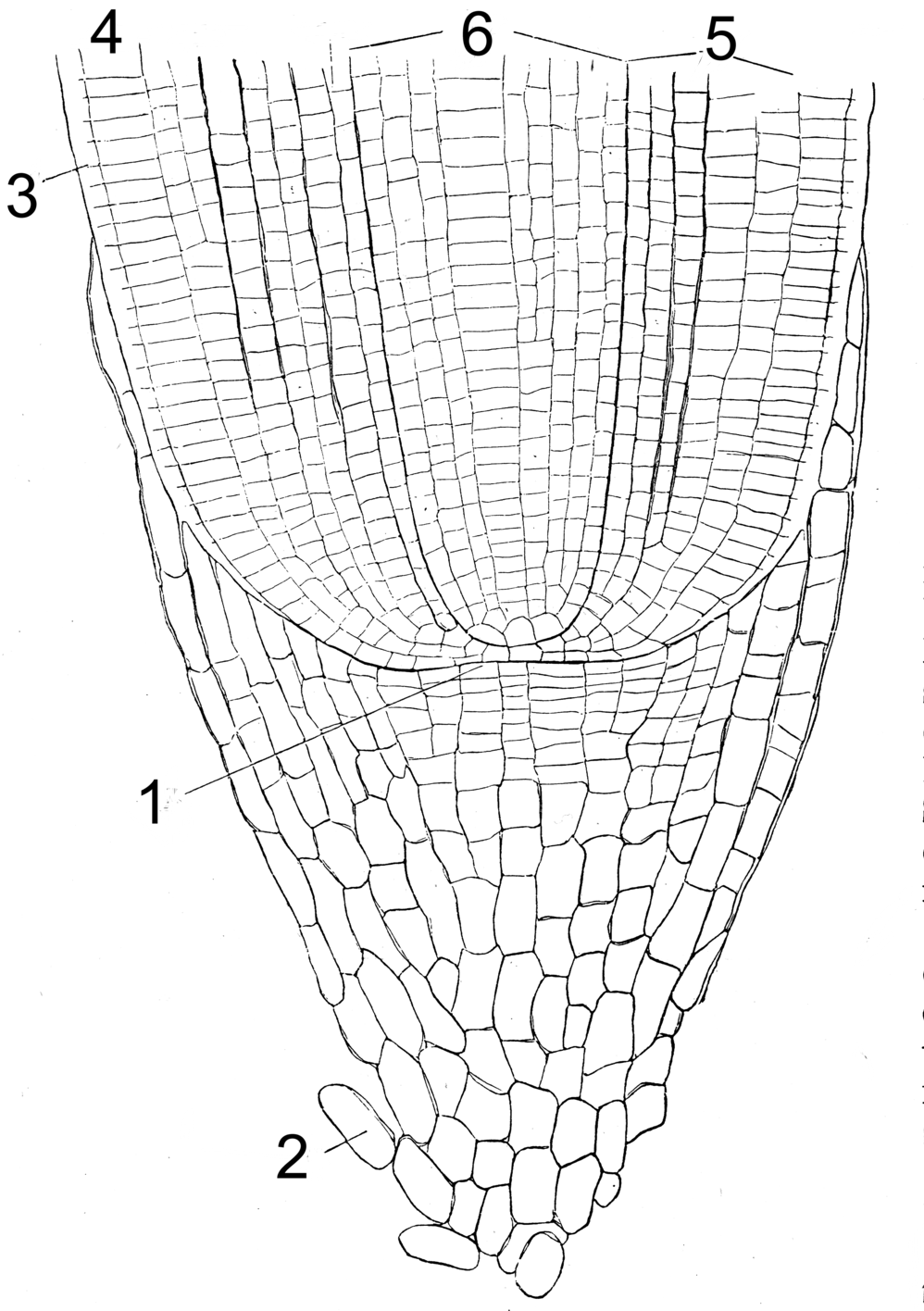
Anatomy of a root tip. 3 is the rhizodermis

Rhizodermis is the root epidermis (also referred to as epiblem), the outermost primary cell layer of the root.

Specialized rhizodermal cells, trichoblasts, form long tubular structures (from 5 to 17 micrometers in diameter and from 80 micrometers to 1.5 millimeters in length) almost perpendicular to the main cell axis – root hairs that absorb water and nutrients. Root hairs of the rhizodermis are always in close contact with soil particles and because of their high surface to volume ratio form an absorbing surface which is much larger than the transpiring surfaces of the plant.

With some species of the family Fabaceae, the rhizodermis participates in the recognition and the uptake of nitrogen-fixing Rhizobia bacteria – the first stage of nodulation leading to formation of root nodules. Rhizodermis plays an important role in nutrient uptake by the plant roots.

In contrast with the epidermis, rhizodermis contains no stomata, and is not covered by cuticle. Its unique feature is the presence of root hairs. Root hair is the outgrowth of a single rhizodermal cell. They occur in high frequency in the adsorptive zone of the root. Root hair derives from a trichoblast as a result of an unequal division. It contains a large vacuole; its cytoplasm and nucleus are superseded to the apical region of the outgrowth. Although it does not divide, its DNA replicates so the nucleus is polyploid. Root hairs live only for few days, and die off in 1–2 days due to mechanical damages.
