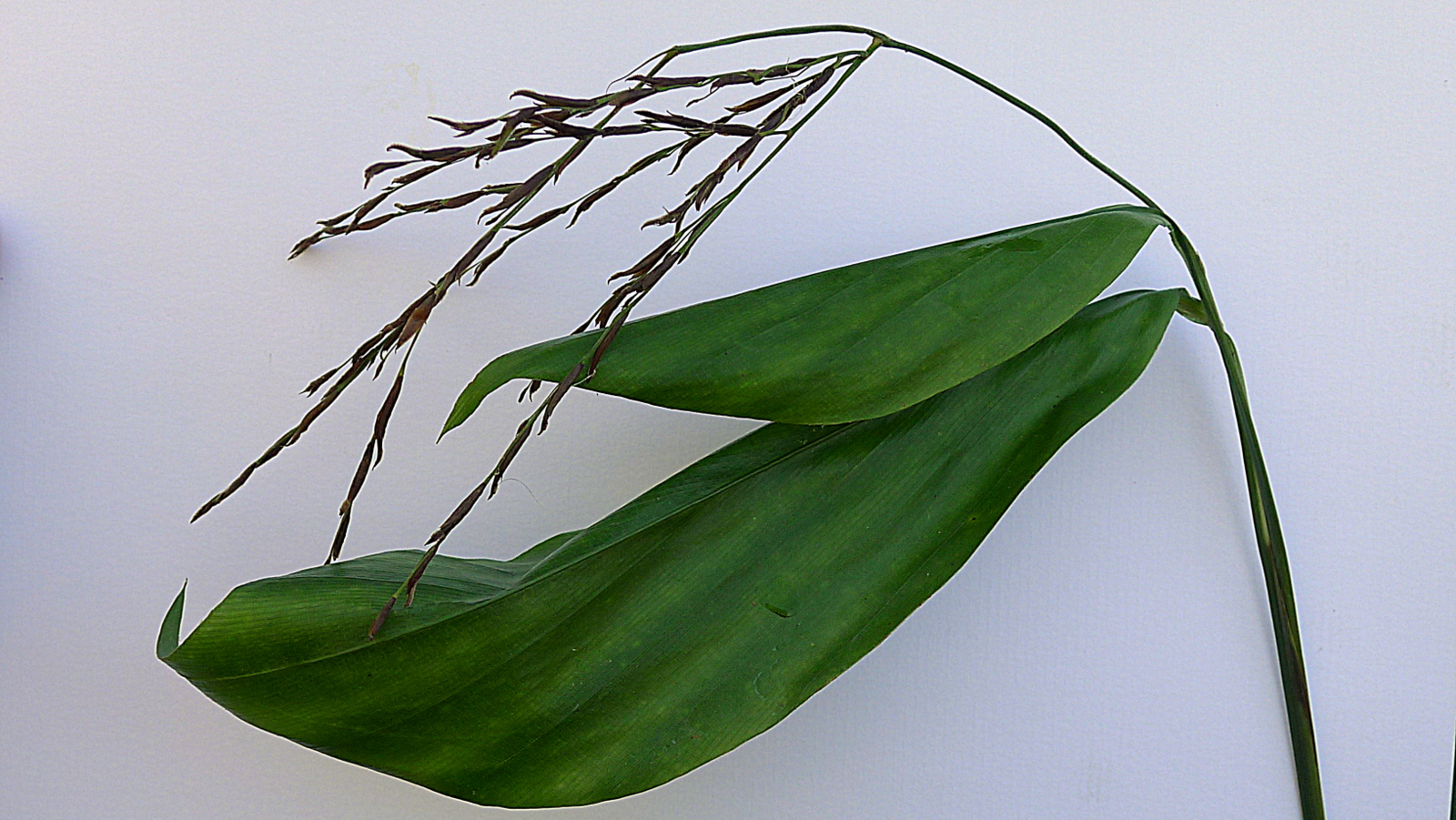
- Pharus latifolius

Scientific classification
- Kingdom: Plantae
- Clade: Tracheophytes
- Clade: Angiosperms
- Clade: Monocots
- Clade: Commelinids
- Order: Poales
- Family: Poaceae
- Subfamily: Pharoideae
- Tribe: Phareae
- Genus: Pharus; P.Browne

Type species
- Pharus latifolius L.

= Pharus (plant) =

Genus of grasses

Pharus, the stalkgrasses, is a genus of Neotropical plants in the grass family.

As an early-diverging genus in its family, it is of interest for the study of the evolution of the grasses. Hence, the genome of P. latifolius has been sequenced.

== Species ==
- Pharus ecuadoricus Judz. - Ecuador
- Pharus lappulaceus Aubl. - Americas from Florida + San Luis Potosí to Uruguay
- Pharus latifolius L. - Americas from Cuba + Veracruz to Bolivia
- Pharus mezii Prodoehl - southern Mexico, Central America, Colombia, Venezuela, Ecuador
- Pharus parvifolius Nash - southern Mexico, Central America, northern South America, West Indies
- Pharus virescens Döll - Central America, northern South America
- Pharus vittatus Lem. - Central America, Colombia

== formerly included ==
see Hygroryza Leersia Leptaspis Scrotochloa

- Pharus aristatus - Hygroryza aristata
- Pharus banksii - Leptaspis banksii
- Pharus ciliatus - Leersia hexandra
- Pharus natans - Hygroryza aristata
- Pharus urceolatus - Scrotochloa urceolata
