= Pharus ecuadoricus =

Conservation status
- Endangered (IUCN 3.1)

Scientific classification
- Kingdom: Plantae
- Clade: Tracheophytes
- Clade: Angiosperms
- Clade: Monocots
- Clade: Commelinids
- Order: Poales
- Family: Poaceae
- Genus: Pharus
- Species: P. ecuadoricus

Binomial name
- Pharus ecuadoricus Judz.

Species of grass

Pharus ecuadoricus is a species of grass in the family Poaceae. It is found only in Ecuador, where it grows in wet coastal forest habitat. There are only three known subpopulations.
