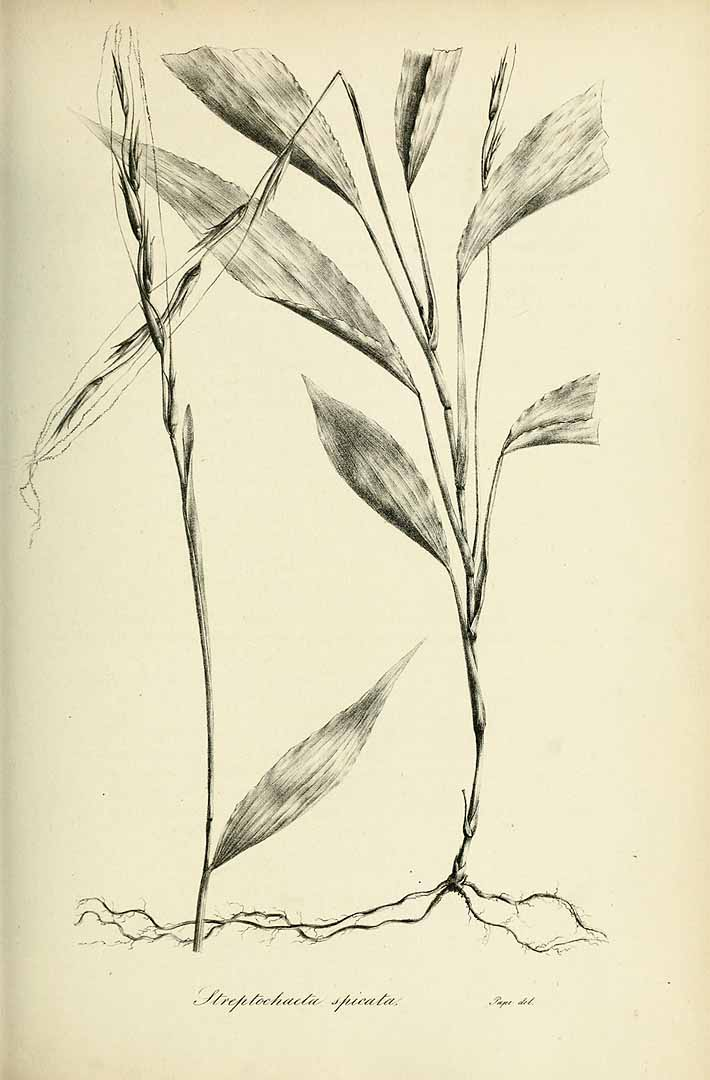
- Drawing of Streptochaeta spicata

Scientific classification
- Kingdom: Plantae
- Clade: Tracheophytes
- Clade: Angiosperms
- Clade: Monocots
- Clade: Commelinids
- Order: Poales
- Family: Poaceae
- Subfamily: Anomochlooideae
- Tribe: Streptochaeteae; C.E.Hubb.
- Genus: Streptochaeta; Schrad. ex Nees.

Type species
- Streptochaeta spicata Schrad. ex Nees.

Synonyms
- Lepideilema Trin.

= Streptochaeta =

Genus of plants

Streptochaeta is a genus of plants in the grass family. It is the only genus in the tribe Streptochaeteae of the family Poaceae.

The species of Streptochaeta are native to neotropical realm regions of North America, the Caribbean, Central America, and South America.

As the genus is an early-diverging sister lineage in relation to most other grasses, the genome of S. angustifolia has been sequenced to study the evolution of the Poaceae.

== Species ==
Species include:

- Streptochaeta angustifolia Soderstr. — endemic to Espírito Santo state of southeastern Brazil, not seen in wild since 1972 and possibly an extinct species.
- Streptochaeta sodiroana Hack. — Chiapas and Tabasco states of southern Mexico; all Central American countries except El Salvador; Ecuador; Peru; and Venezuela.
- Streptochaeta spicata Schrad. ex Nees in C.F.P.von Martius — widespread from Veracruz (México), the Caribbean to Trinidad island, and South America to Paraguay.
