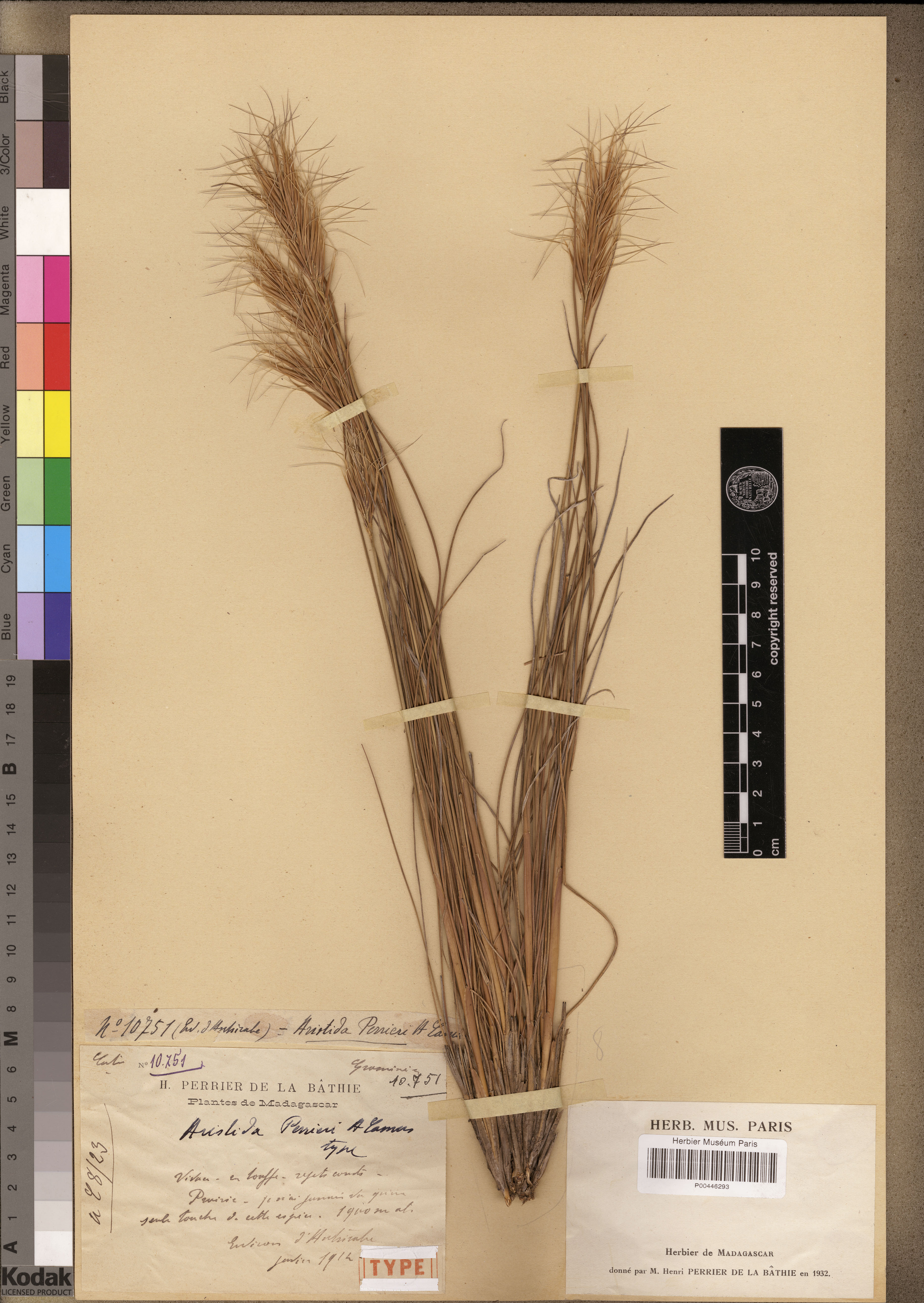
- Only known specimen of Sartidia perrieri

Scientific classification
- Kingdom: Plantae
- Clade: Tracheophytes
- Clade: Angiosperms
- Clade: Monocots
- Clade: Commelinids
- Order: Poales
- Family: Poaceae
- Subfamily: Aristidoideae
- Tribe: Aristideae
- Genus: Sartidia; De Winter

Type species
- Sartidia angolensis (C.E.Hubb.) De Winter

Species
- Six species, see text

= Sartidia =

Genus of grasses

Sartidia is a genus of Southern African and Madagascan plants in the grass family. It was split from Aristida in 1963 by South African botanist Bernard de Winter and contains six known species, of which Sartidia perrieri is considered extinct. Their natural habitats are warm, semi-arid savanna and dry forest at altitudes of 800–2,000 m (2,600–6,600 ft) where rainfall ranges from 250 to 1,500 mm per year. They are perennial grasses with inflorescence in a panicle.

Other than most species in subfamily Aristidoideae, Sartidia species use the ancestral C_{3} photosynthetic pathway. Phylogenetic analyses suggest that Sartidia is the sister genus of Stipagrostis, an important C_{4} genus from Africa and Southwest Asia.

Species

- Sartidia angolensis (C.E.Hubb.) De Winter – Angola, Zambia, Zimbabwe, Namibia
- Sartidia dewinteri Munday & Fish – Mpumalanga (South Africa), Eswatini
- Sartidia isaloensis Voronts., Razanatsoa & Besnard – Madagascar
- Sartidia jucunda (Schweick.) De Winter – Limpopo (South Africa)
- Sartidia perrieri (A.Camus) Bourreil – Madagascar (extinct)
- Sartidia vanderystii (De Wild.) De Winter – Democratic Republic of the Congo
