= Guaduella =

Scientific classification
- Kingdom: Plantae
- Clade: Tracheophytes
- Clade: Angiosperms
- Clade: Monocots
- Clade: Commelinids
- Order: Poales
- Family: Poaceae
- Subfamily: Puelioideae
- Tribe: Guaduelleae; Soderstr. & R.P.Ellis
- Genus: Guaduella; Franch.

Type species
- Guaduella marantifolia Franch.

Synonyms
- Microbambus K.Schum

Genus of grasses

Guaduella is a genus of African plants in the grass family, the only genus in the tribe Guaduelleae. It belongs to the subfamily Puelioideae, one of the early-diverging lineages in the grasses, but used to be included in the bamboos.

Species

1. Guaduella densiflora Pilg. - Nigeria, Cabinda, Cameroon, Republic of Congo, Gabon, Equatorial Guinea
2. Guaduella dichroa Cope - Cabinda
3. Guaduella humilis Clayton - Nigeria, Cameroon
4. Guaduella macrostachys (K.Schum.) Pilg. - Ghana, Nigeria, Cameroon, Gabon
5. Guaduella marantifolia Franch. - Cameroon, Republic of Congo, Gabon
6. Guaduella oblonga Hutch. ex Clayton - Guinea, Sierra Leone, Ivory Coast, Cameroon, Republic of Congo, Gabon, São Tomé, Bioko
