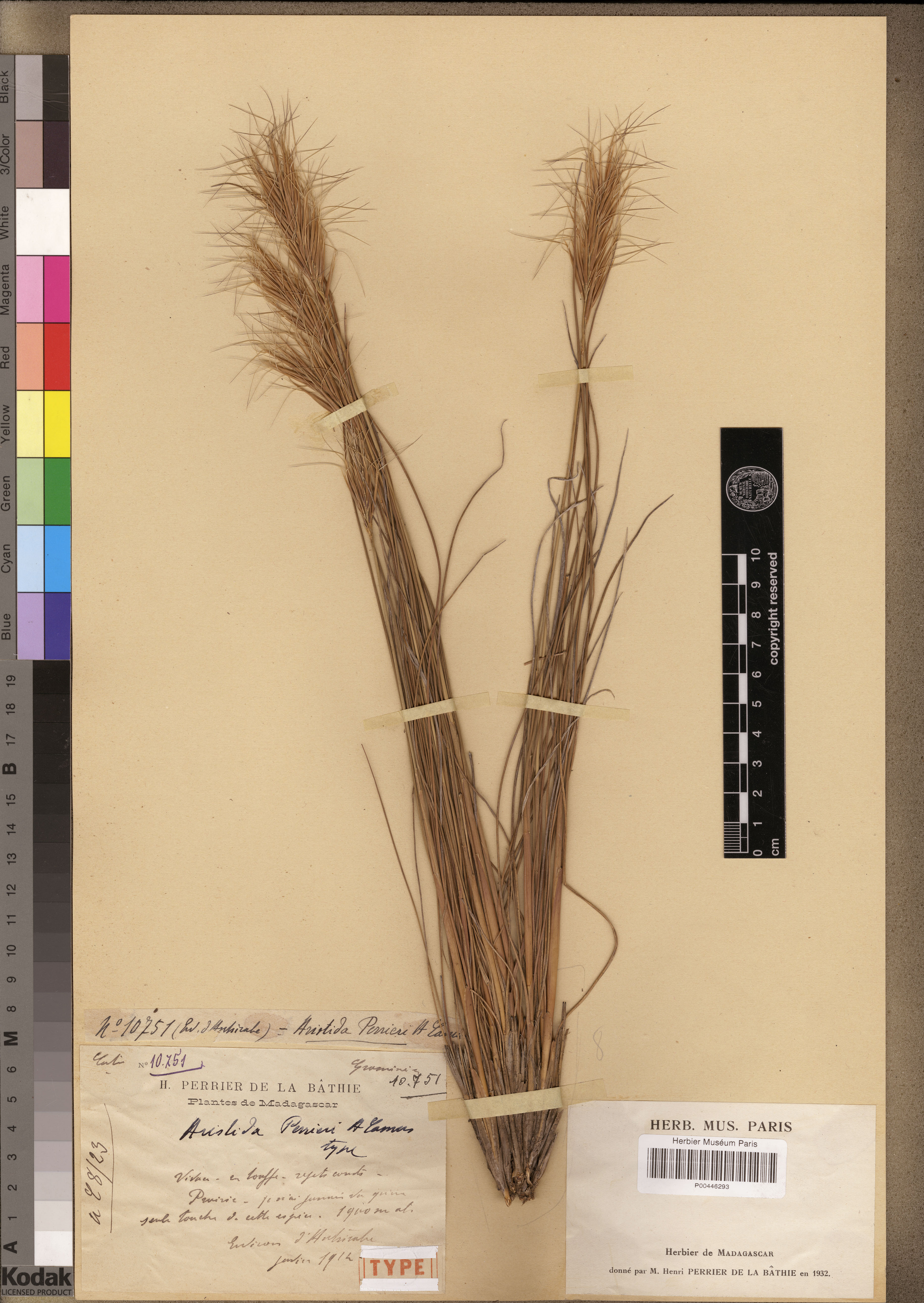
- Type specimen and only known individual

Conservation status
- Extinct in the Wild (IUCN 3.1)

Scientific classification
- Kingdom: Plantae
- Clade: Tracheophytes
- Clade: Angiosperms
- Clade: Monocots
- Clade: Commelinids
- Order: Poales
- Family: Poaceae
- Genus: Sartidia
- Species: S. perrieri

Binomial name
- Sartidia perrieri (A.Camus) Bourreil

Synonyms
- Aristida perrieri A.Camus

= Sartidia perrieri =

Species of grass

Sartidia perrieri is a grass species endemic to Madagascar, known from only one collected individual and now possibly extinct.

Henri Perrier de la Bâthie, in 1914, collected a plant in the central region of Madagascar, near Antsirabe, at an elevation of 1,900 m (6,200 ft), where it grew on sandstone rocks in tapia woodland. He wrote in the description of the dried herbarium specimen that he only ever saw one individual of this species, suggesting it was already very rare at that time. Aimée Antoinette Camus named it after its collector and described it as new species in the genus Aristida; Pierre Bourreil later transferred it to Sartidia.

Sartidia perrieri is a tuft-forming grass. The known individual is roughly 50 cm (20 in) high, with 15–20 cm (5.9–7.9 in) long leaf blades. Inflorescence is a dense, 6–10 cm (2.4–3.9 in) long panicle and the species has 2–3.5 cm (0.8–1.4 in) long awns extending from the lemmas in the spikelets. With its clusters of large spikelets, it is very different from the only other known Sartidia species from Madagascar, S. isaloensis.

In 2014, biologists were able to sequence chloroplast and nuclear DNA from the 100-year-old type specimen and confirmed its placement in Sartidia with molecular phylogenetics. It was closer to Southern African species than to S. isaloensis, suggesting the two species descend from lineages that colonised Madagascar independently.

No other individual of Sartidia perrieri has been found since the original collection, and the species was accordingly assessed as extinct in the wild. It was suggested that pressure from grazing and agricultural expansion was already high at the time when Perrier de la Bâthie collected the plant. Wooded savannas may have been replaced by open, C_{4} grass-dominated grasslands, leading to the loss of habitats suitable to C_{3} grasses like S. perrieri.
