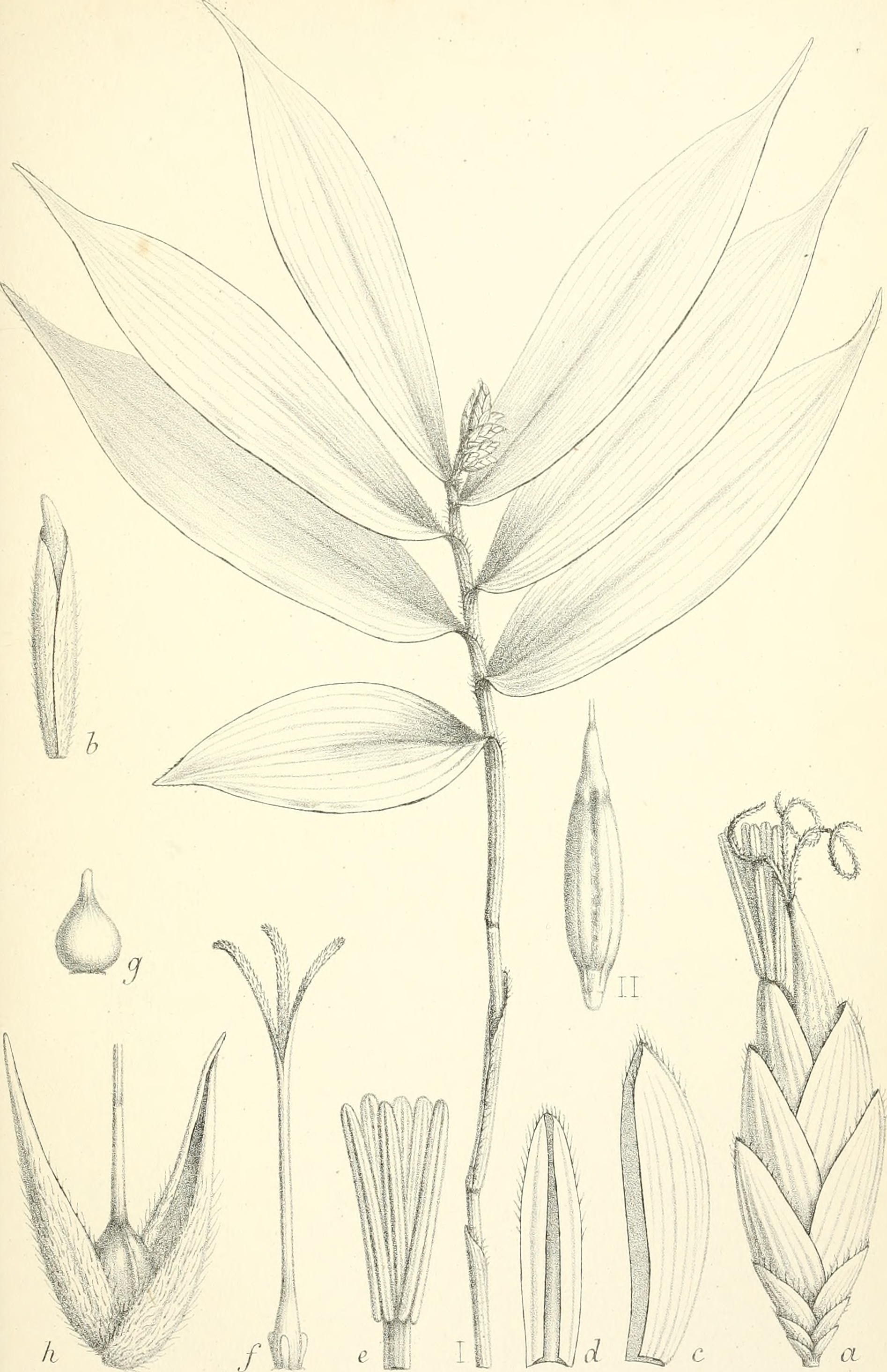
- Puelia ciliata and Puelia olyriformis

Scientific classification
- Kingdom: Plantae
- Clade: Tracheophytes
- Clade: Angiosperms
- Clade: Monocots
- Clade: Commelinids
- Order: Poales
- Family: Poaceae
- Subfamily: Puelioideae
- Tribe: Atractocarpeae; Jacq.-Fél. ex Tzvelev
- Genus: Puelia; Franch.

Type species
- Puelia ciliata Franch.

Synonyms
- Atractocarpa Franch.

= Puelia =

Genus of grasses

Puelia is a genus of African grasses, the only genus in the tribe Atractocarpeae (syn. Puelieae). It belongs to the subfamily Puelioideae, one of the early-diverging lineages in the grasses, but used to be considered a bamboo genus.

== Species ==
- Puelia ciliata Franch. - Cameroon, Republic of Congo, Gabon, São Tomé, Bioko
- Puelia coriacea Clayton - Zaïre
- Puelia dewevrei De Wild. & T.Durand - Zaïre, Republic of Congo, Gabon
- Puelia olyriformis (Franch.) Clayton - Liberia, Senegal, Sierra Leone, Republic of Congo, Gabon, Tanzania
- Puelia schumanniana Pilg. - Cameroon

Formerly included

- Puelia guluensis - Guaduella macrostachys
