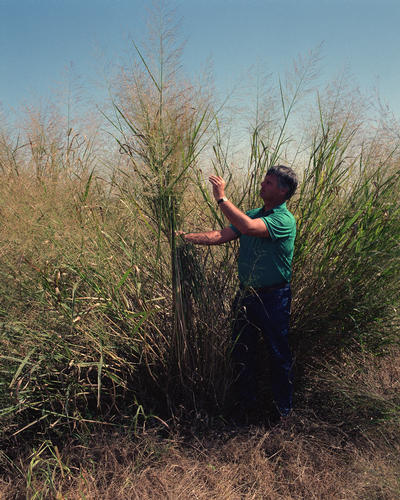
- switchgrass (Panicum virgatum)

Scientific classification
- Kingdom: Plantae
- Clade: Tracheophytes
- Clade: Angiosperms
- Clade: Monocots
- Clade: Commelinids
- Order: Poales
- Family: Poaceae
- Clade: PACMAD clade

Subfamilies
- Aristidoideae; Arundinoideae; Chloridoideae; Danthonioideae; Micrairoideae; Panicoideae

= PACMAD clade =

PACMAD clade Temporal range: Campanian–Recent

Major clade in the grass family Poaceae

The PACMAD clade (previously PACCMAD, PACCAD, or PACC) is one of two major lineages (or clades) of the true grasses (Poaceae), regrouping six subfamilies and about 5700 species, more than half of all true grasses. Its sister group is the BOP clade. The PACMAD lineage is the only group within the grasses in which the C_{4} photosynthesis pathway has evolved; studies have shown that this happened independently multiple times.

== Phylogeny ==
The name of the clade comes from the first initials of the included subfamilies Panicoideae, Arundinoideae, Chloridoideae, Micrairoideae, Aristidoideae, and Danthonioideae. It has no defined taxonomic rank but is used frequently because it refers to a well-defined monophyletic group with a distinct ecology.

Phylogeny of the PACMAD clade, with photosynthetic pathways for each subfamily:

- Poaceae
  - Anomochlooideae
  - - Pharoideae
    - - Puelioideae
      - - BOP clade
        - PACMAD clade
          - Aristidoideae C_{3} & C_{4}
          - - Panicoideae C_{3} & C_{4}
            - - - Chloridoideae C_{3} & C_{4}
                - Danthonioideae C_{3}
              - - Arundinoideae C_{3}
                - Micrairoideae C_{3} & C_{4}
