= Leptaspis =

Scientific classification
- Kingdom: Plantae
- Clade: Tracheophytes
- Clade: Angiosperms
- Clade: Monocots
- Clade: Commelinids
- Order: Poales
- Family: Poaceae
- Subfamily: Pharoideae
- Tribe: Phareae
- Genus: Leptaspis; R.Br.

Type species
- Leptaspis banksii R.Br.

Genus of grasses

Leptaspis is a genus of Paleotropical plants in the grass family, native to Africa, southern Asia, northern Australia, and a few islands of the western Pacific.

Species

- Leptaspis angustifolia Summerh. & C.E.Hubb. - New Guinea, Fiji
- Leptaspis banksii R.Br. - Queensland, New Caledonia, New Guinea, Solomon Islands, Philippines, Taiwan, Sulawesi, Malaysia, Java, Lesser Sunda Islands, Thailand
- Leptaspis zeylanica Nees ex Steud. - tropical Africa from Liberia to Ethiopia to Zimbabwe; Madagascar, Comoros, Sri Lanka, Java, Malaysia, Sumatra, Sulawesi, New Guinea, Solomon Islands

Formerly included

see Scrotochloa

- Leptaspis manillensis - Scrotochloa urceolata
- Leptaspis tararaensis - Scrotochloa tararaensis
- Leptaspis urceolata - Scrotochloa urceolata
