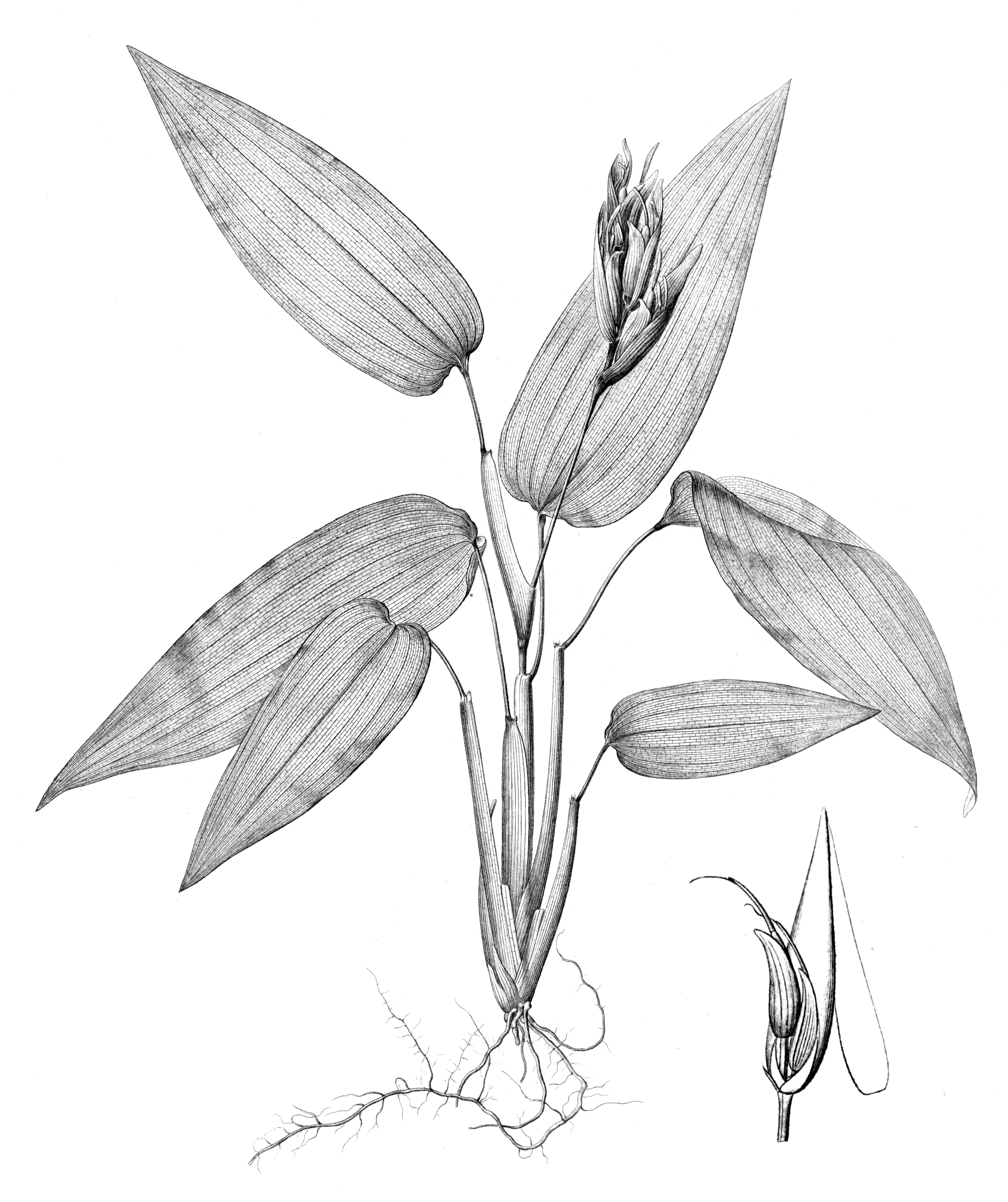
- Botanical illustration

Scientific classification
- Kingdom: Plantae
- Clade: Tracheophytes
- Clade: Angiosperms
- Clade: Monocots
- Clade: Commelinids
- Order: Poales
- Family: Poaceae
- Subfamily: Anomochlooideae
- Tribe: Anomochloeae; C.E.Hubb.
- Genus: Anomochloa; Brongn.
- Species: A. marantoidea

Binomial name
- Anomochloa marantoidea Brongn.
- It is endemic to Brazil

= Anomochloa =

Genus of plants

Anomochloa is a monotypic genus of flowering plants in the grass family, Poaceae. It is one of the two genera in its subfamily and the only genus in the tribe Anomochloeae. The only known species is Anomochloa marantoidea, native to the State of Bahia in eastern Brazil.

== Description ==
=== Vegetative characteristics ===
Anomochloa is a terrestrial, perennial, rhizomatous herb.

=== Generative characteristics ===
The oblong, laterally compressed 10 mm long, and 2.5 mm wide caryopsis has an adherent pericarp.

== Cytology ==
The diploid chromosome count of Anomochloa is 2n = 36.

== Taxonomy ==
It was published by Adolphe Théodore Brongniart in 1851. Within the subfamily Anomochlooideae, it is placed in its own monotypic tribe Anomochloeae.

== Conservation ==
It is an endangered and extremely rare species.
