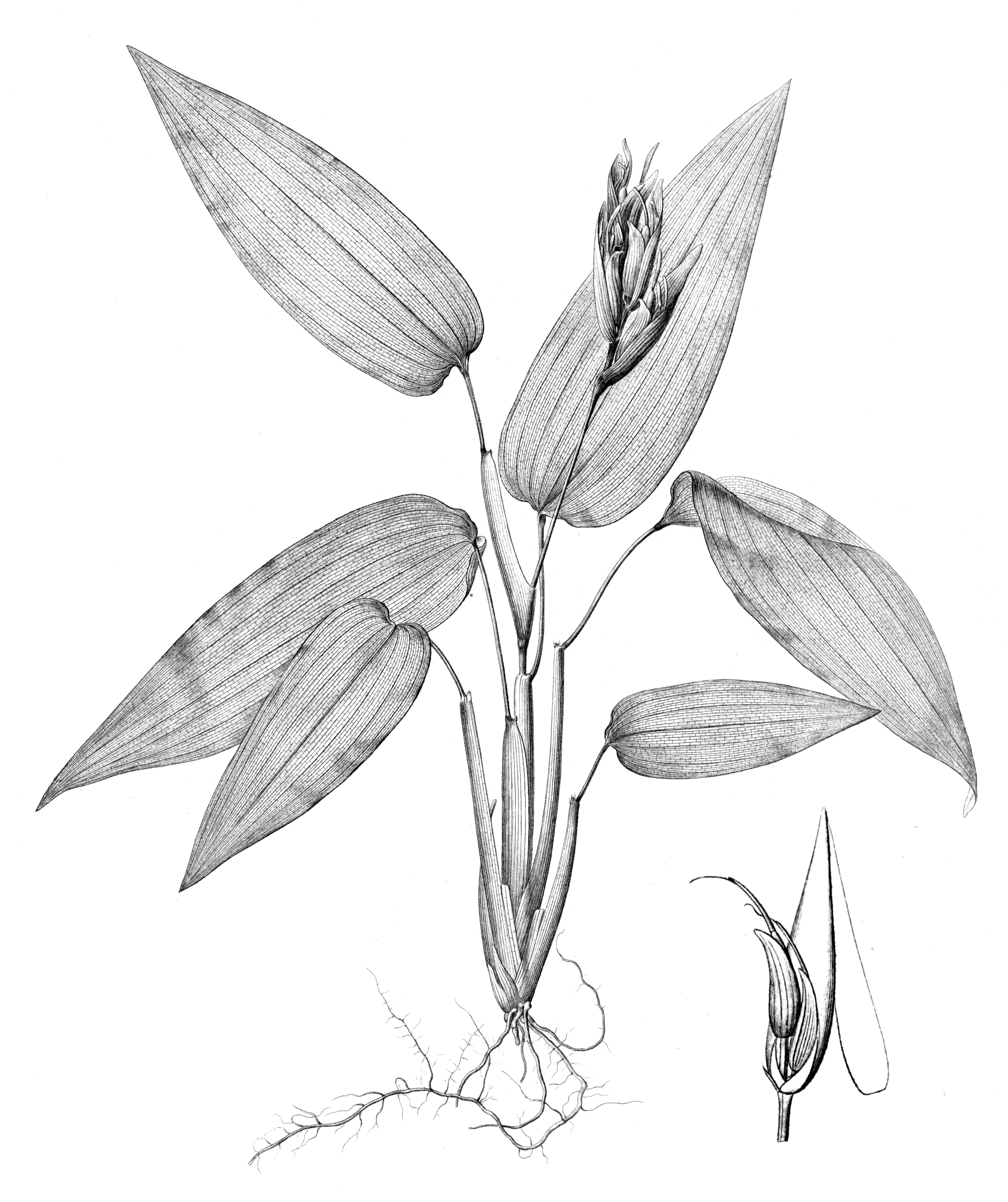
- Drawing of Anomochloa

Scientific classification
- Kingdom: Plantae
- Clade: Tracheophytes
- Clade: Angiosperms
- Clade: Monocots
- Clade: Commelinids
- Order: Poales
- Family: Poaceae
- Subfamily: Anomochlooideae; Pilg. ex Potztal

Type genus
- Anomochloa Brongn.

Tribes
- Anomochloeae C.E.Hubb; Streptochaeteae C.E.Hubb

Synonyms
- Streptochaetoideae Butzin (1965)

= Anomochlooideae =

Subfamily of plants

Anomochlooideae is a subfamily of the true grass family Poaceae. It is sister to all the other grasses. It includes perennial herbs that grow on the shaded floor of forests in the Neotropics. There are two genera, Anomochloa and Streptochaeta, each in its own tribe.

== Description ==
Anomochlooideae are terrestrial, rhizomatous, perennial herbs with pseudopetiolate, broad leaves.

== Cytology ==
The diploid chromosome count of Anomochloa is 2n = 36, and the chromosome count of Streptochaeta is 2n = 22.

== Taxonomy ==
It was validly published in 1957 by Eva Hedwig Ingeborg Potztal based on previous work from Robert Knud Friedrich Pilger. The type genus is Anomochloa Brongn.

=== Evolutionary relationships ===
This subfamily is the most early-diverging lineage of the grasses:

- Poaceae
  - Anomochlooideae
  - - Pharoideae
    - - Puelioideae
      - - BOP clade
        - PACMAD clade

== Conservation ==
Anomochloa marantoidea is almost extinct in the wild.
