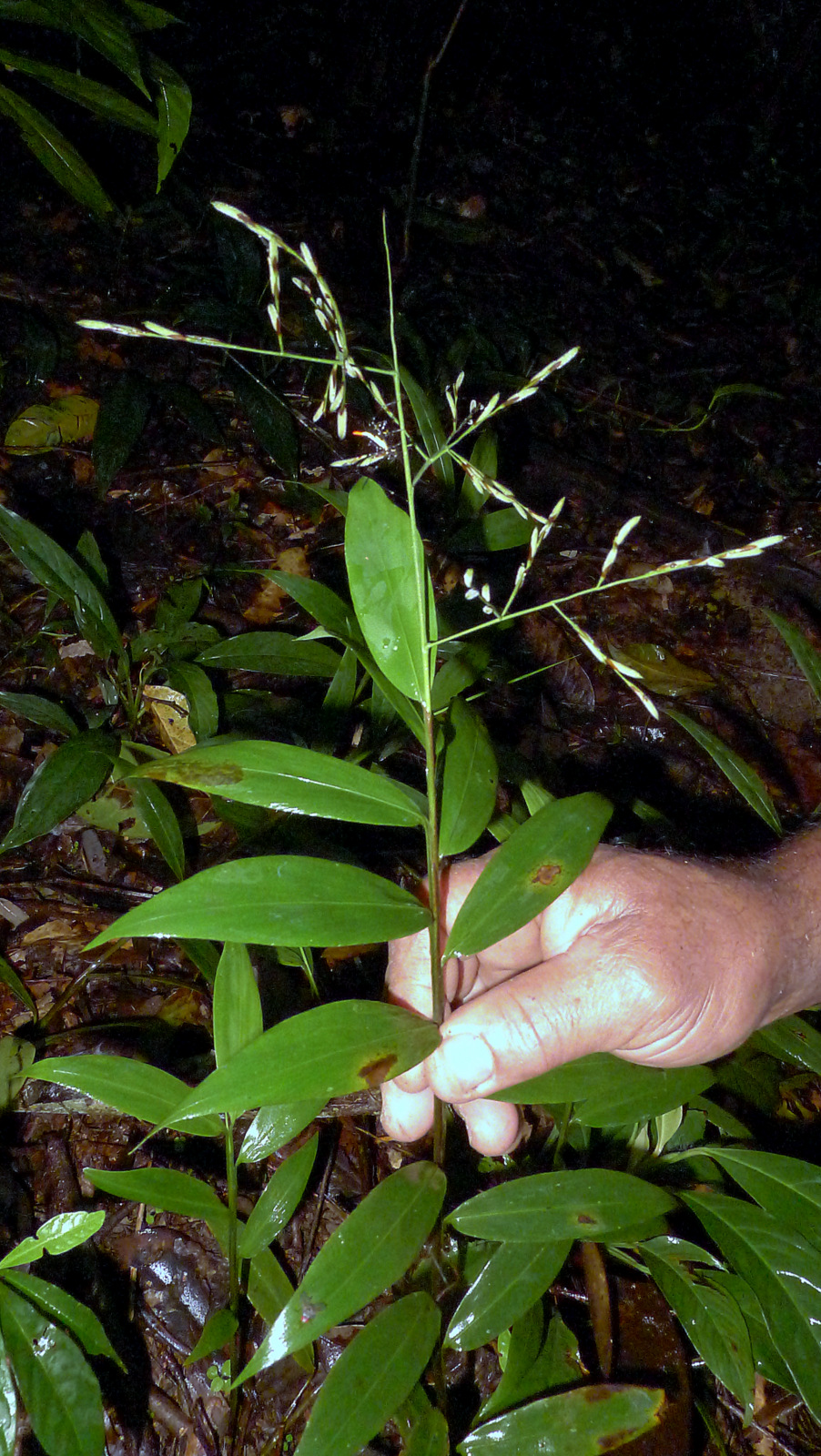
- Pharus parvifolius

Scientific classification
- Kingdom: Plantae
- Clade: Tracheophytes
- Clade: Angiosperms
- Clade: Monocots
- Clade: Commelinids
- Order: Poales
- Family: Poaceae
- Subfamily: Pharoideae; L.G.Clark & Judz. (1996)
- Tribe: Phareae; Stapf (1898)

Genera
- Leptaspis; Pharus; Scrotochloa

Synonyms
- Leptaspidoideae C.O. Morales (1998); supertribe Pharoidae L. Liu (1980)

= Pharoideae =

Subfamily of plants

Pharoideae is a subfamily of the true grass family Poaceae, containing the single tribe Phareae with the two genera Leptaspis and Pharus. Its members grow on the shaded floors of tropical to warm temperate forests.

This subfamily is one of the earliest-diverging grass lineages, older than the big BOP and PACMAD clades:

- Poaceae
  - Anomochlooideae
  - - Pharoideae
    - - Puelioideae
      - - BOP clade
        - PACMAD clade
