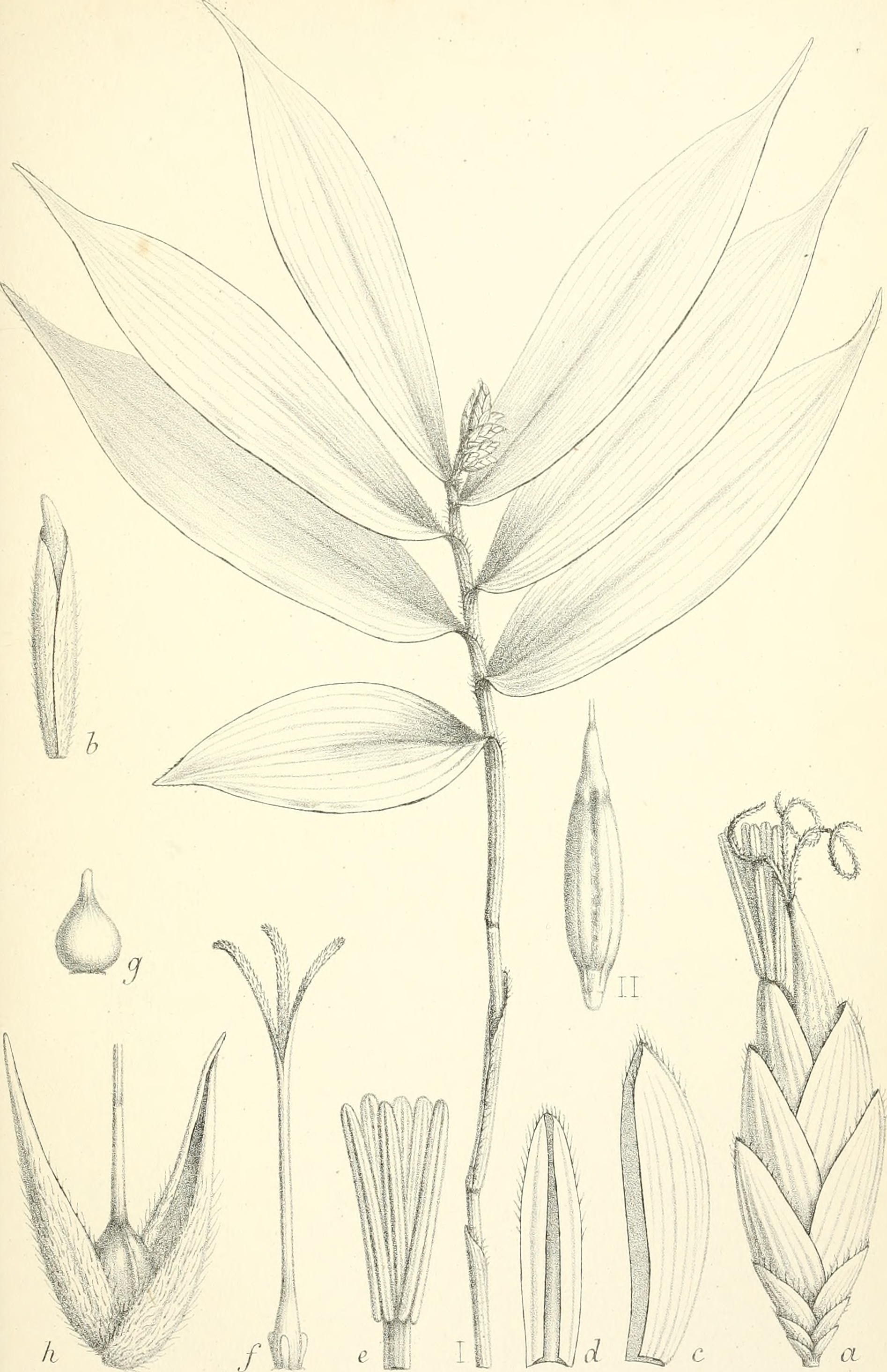
- Bulletin (1888-1949)

Scientific classification
- Kingdom: Plantae
- Clade: Tracheophytes
- Clade: Angiosperms
- Clade: Monocots
- Clade: Commelinids
- Order: Poales
- Family: Poaceae
- Subfamily: Puelioideae; L.G.Clark, M.Kobay., S.Mathews, Spangler & E.A.Kellogg (2000)

Tribes
- Atractocarpeae; Guaduelleae

= Puelioideae =

Subfamily of plants

The Puelioideae is a subfamily of the true grass family Poaceae with two genera, Guaduella and Puelia, each in its own tribe. Its members grow in the understory of rainforests.

This subfamily is one of the earliest-diverging grass lineages, sister to the big BOP and PACMAD clades:

- Poaceae
  - Anomochlooideae
  - - Pharoideae
    - - Puelioideae
      - - BOP clade
        - PACMAD clade
