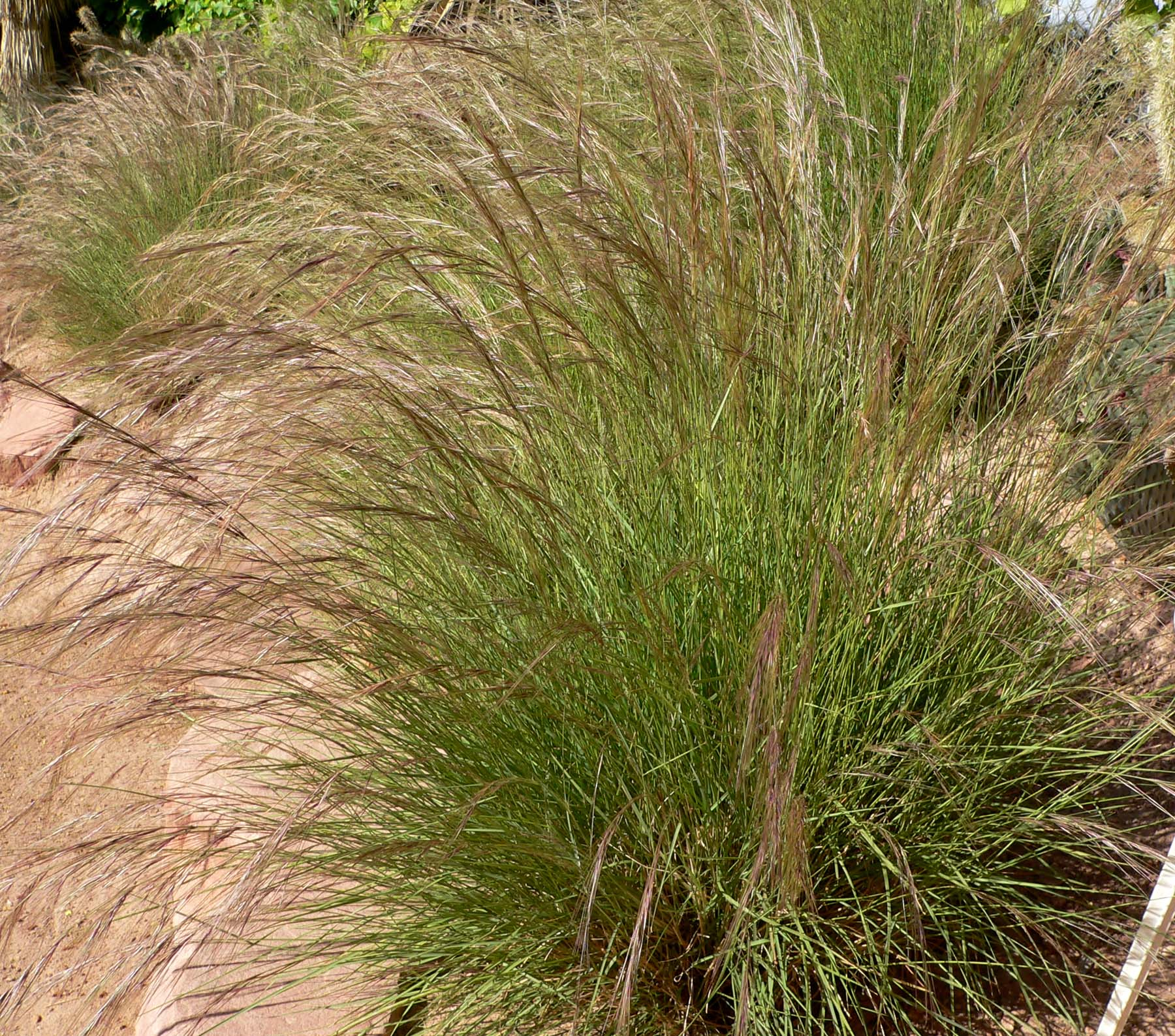
- Aristida purpurea

Scientific classification
- Kingdom: Plantae
- Clade: Tracheophytes
- Clade: Angiosperms
- Clade: Monocots
- Clade: Commelinids
- Order: Poales
- Family: Poaceae
- Clade: PACMAD clade
- Subfamily: Aristidoideae; Caro
- Tribe: Aristideae; C.E.Hubbard

= Aristideae =

Tribe of plants

The Aristideae is the sole tribe of grasses in the monotypic subfamily Aristidoideae of the true grass family Poaceae. Its members are herbaceous annuals or perennials found in the tropics, subtropics and temperate zones. The tribe has over 300 species in three genera: The subfamily is a member of the PACMAD clade of grasses, the evolutionary group in which C4 photosynthesis independently evolved a number of times.

- Aristida
- Sartidia
- Stipagrostis
