= Scrotochloa =

Scientific classification
- Kingdom: Plantae
- Clade: Tracheophytes
- Clade: Angiosperms
- Clade: Monocots
- Clade: Commelinids
- Order: Poales
- Family: Poaceae
- Subfamily: Pharoideae
- Tribe: Phareae
- Genus: Scrotochloa; Judz.

Type species
- Scrotochloa urceolata (Roxb.) Judz.

Genus of grasses

Scrotochloa is a genus of Asian, Australian, and Papuasian plants in the grass family.

The genus is closely related to Leptaspis and included inside that group by some authors.

Species

- Scrotochloa tararaensis (Jansen) Judz. - New Guinea, Queensland
- Scrotochloa urceolata (Roxb.) Judz. - New Guinea, Queensland, Solomon Islands, Bismarck Archipelago, Philippines, Malaysia, Java, Borneo, Lesser Sunda Islands, Vietnam, Thailand, Myanmar, India, Sri Lanka
