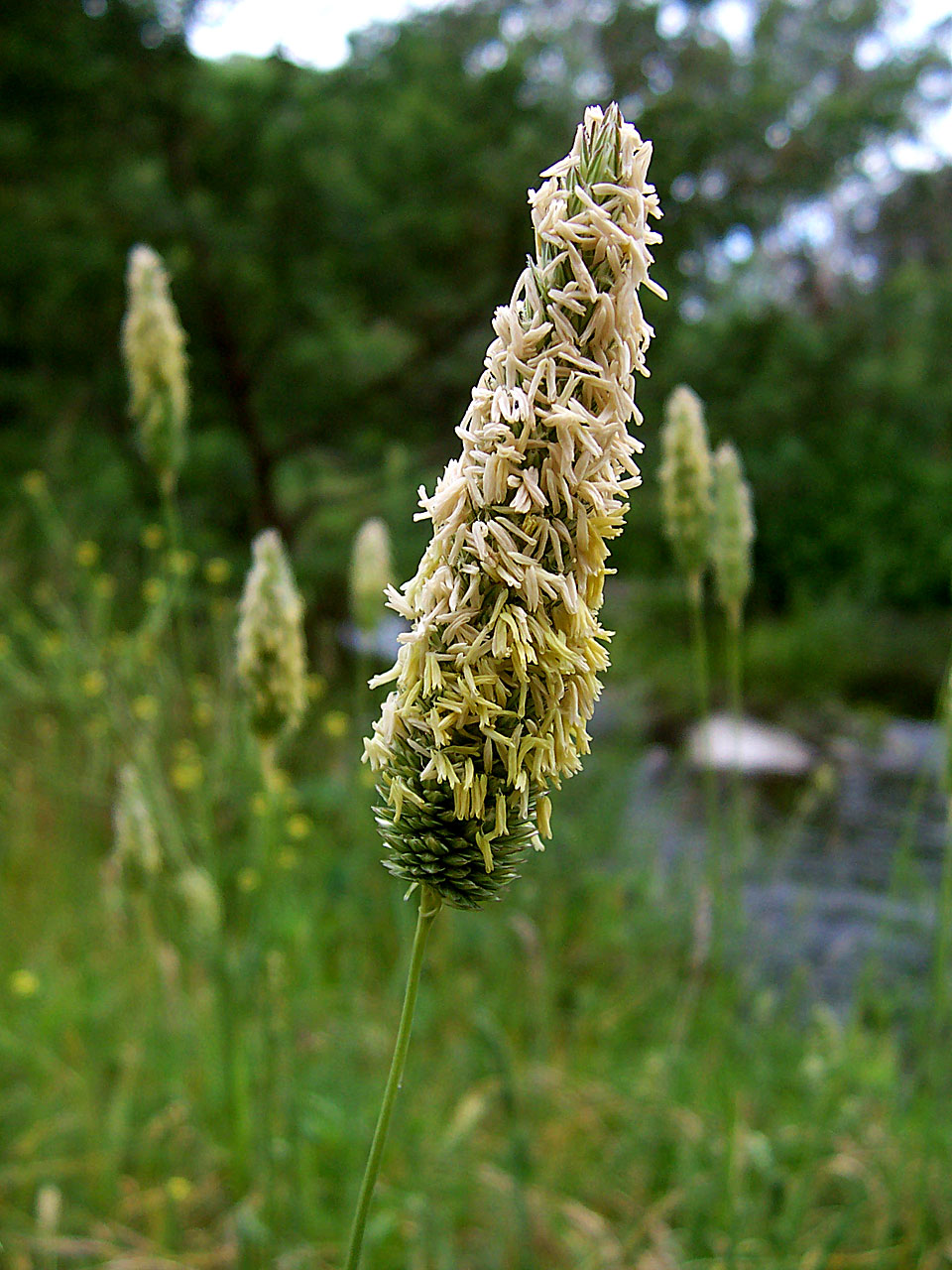
- Flowering head of meadow foxtail (Alopecurus pratensis), with stamens exerted at anthesis

Scientific classification
- Kingdom: Plantae
- Clade: Embryophytes
- Clade: Tracheophytes
- Clade: Angiosperms
- Clade: Monocots
- Clade: Commelinids
- Order: Poales
- Clade: Graminid clade
- Family: Poaceae; Barnhart

Type genus
- Poa L.

Subfamilies
- Anomochlooideae; Aristidoideae; Arundinoideae; Bambusoideae; Chloridoideae; Danthonioideae; Ehrhartoideae; Micrairoideae; Panicoideae; Pharoideae; Pooideae; Puelioideae

Synonyms
- Gramineae Juss.

= Poaceae =

Grasses Temporal range: Albian–Present

Family of flowering plants commonly known as grasses

Poaceae (/poʊˈeɪsi.iː, -ˌaɪ/ poh-AY-see-e(y)e), also called Gramineae (/ɡrəˈmɪni.iː, -ˌaɪ/ grə-MIN-ee-e(y)e), is a large and nearly ubiquitous family of monocotyledonous flowering plants commonly known as true grasses. It includes the cereal grasses, bamboos, the grasses of natural grassland and species cultivated in lawns and pasture. Poaceae is the most well-known family within the informal group known as grass.

With around 780 genera and around 12,000 species, the Poaceae is the fifth-largest plant family, following the Asteraceae, Orchidaceae, Fabaceae and Rubiaceae.

The Poaceae are the most economically important plant family, including staple foods from domesticated cereal crops such as maize, wheat, rice, oats, barley, and millet for people and as feed for meat-producing animals. They provide, through direct human consumption, a substantial portion of all dietary energy: rice provides 20%, wheat supplies 19%, and maize (corn) 5%. Some members of the Poaceae are used as building materials (bamboo, thatch, and straw); others can provide a source of biofuel, primarily via the conversion of maize to ethanol.

Grasses have stems that are hollow except at the nodes and narrow alternate leaves borne in two ranks. The lower part of each leaf encloses the stem, forming a leaf-sheath. The leaf grows from the base of the blade, an adaptation allowing it to cope with frequent grazing.

Grasslands such as savannah and prairie where grasses are dominant are estimated to constitute 40.5% of the land area of the Earth, excluding Greenland and Antarctica. Grasses are also an important part of the vegetation in many other habitats, including wetlands, forests and tundra.

Though they are commonly called "grasses", groups such as the seagrasses, rushes and sedges fall outside this family. The rushes and sedges are related to the Poaceae, being members of the order Poales, but the seagrasses are members of the order Alismatales. However, all of them belong to the monocot group of plants.

== Description ==
Diagram of a typical lawn grass plant

Grasses may be annual or perennial herbs, generally with the following characteristics (the image gallery can be used for reference): The stems of grasses, called culms, are usually cylindrical (more rarely flattened, but not 3-angled) and are hollow, plugged at the nodes, where the leaves are attached. Grass leaves are nearly always alternate and distichous (in one plane), and have parallel veins. Each leaf is differentiated into a lower sheath hugging the stem and a blade with entire (i.e., smooth) margins. The leaf blades of many grasses are hardened with silica phytoliths, which discourage grazing animals; some, such as sword grass, are sharp enough to cut human skin. A membranous appendage or fringe of hairs called the ligule lies at the junction between sheath and blade, preventing water or insects from penetrating into the sheath.

Inflorescence scheme and floral diagram: (1) glume, (2) lemma, (3) awn, (4) palea, (5) lodicules, (6) stamens, (7) ovary, (8) styles

Flowers of Poaceae are characteristically arranged in spikelets, each having one or more florets. The spikelets are further grouped into panicles or spikes. The part of the spikelet that bears the florets is called the rachilla. A spikelet consists of two (or sometimes fewer) bracts at the base, called glumes, followed by one or more florets. A floret consists of the flower surrounded by two bracts, one external—the lemma—and one internal—the palea. The flowers are usually hermaphroditic—maize being an important exception—and mainly anemophilous or wind-pollinated, although insects occasionally play a role. The perianth is reduced to two scales, called lodicules, that expand and contract to spread the lemma and palea; these are generally interpreted to be modified sepals. The fruit of grasses is a caryopsis, in which the seed coat is fused to the fruit wall. A tiller is a leafy shoot other than the first shoot produced from the seed.

=== Growth and development ===
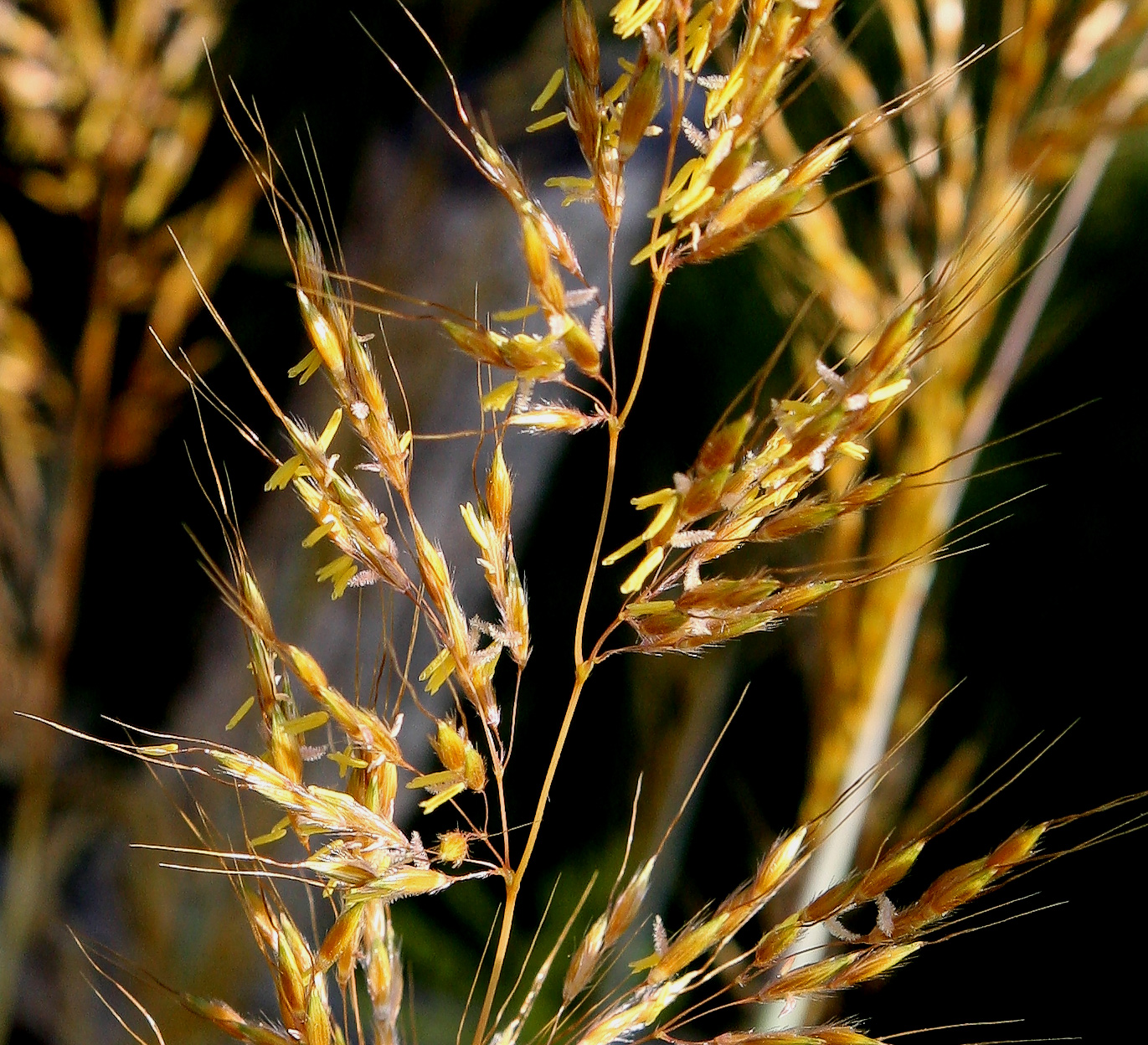
Grass flowers

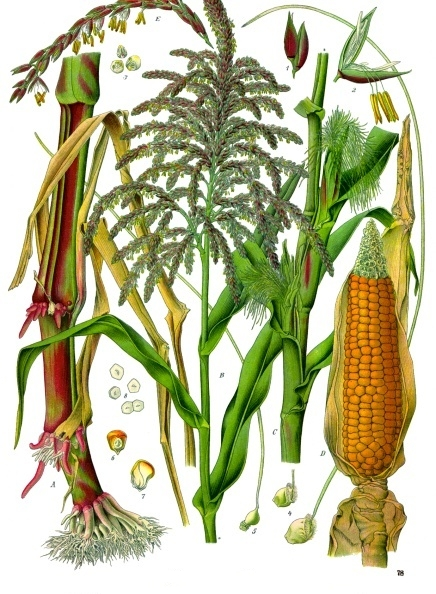
Illustration depicting both staminate and pistillate flowers of maize (Zea mays)

Grass blades grow at the base of the blade and not from elongated stem tips. This low growth point evolved in response to grazing animals and allows grasses to be grazed or mown regularly without severe damage to the plant.

Three general classifications of growth habit present in grasses: bunch-type (also called caespitose), stoloniferous, and rhizomatous. The success of the grasses lies in part in their morphology and growth processes and in part in their physiological diversity. There are both C3 and C4 grasses, referring to the photosynthetic pathway for carbon fixation. The C4 grasses have a photosynthetic pathway, linked to specialized Kranz leaf anatomy, which allows for increased water use efficiency, rendering them better adapted to hot, arid environments.

The C3 grasses are referred to as "cool-season" grasses, while the C4 plants are considered "warm-season" grasses.

- Annual cool-season – wheat, rye, annual bluegrass (annual meadowgrass, Poa annua), and oat
- Perennial cool-season – orchardgrass (cocksfoot, Dactylis glomerata), fescue (Festuca spp.), Kentucky bluegrass and perennial ryegrass (Lolium perenne)
- Annual warm-season – maize, sudangrass, and pearl millet
- Perennial warm-season – big bluestem, Indiangrass, Bermudagrass and switchgrass.

Although the C4 species are all in the PACMAD clade (see diagram below), it seems that various forms of C4 have arisen some twenty or more times, in various subfamilies or genera. In the Aristida genus for example, one species (A. longifolia) is C3 but the approximately 300 other species are C4. As another example, the whole tribe of Andropogoneae, which includes maize, sorghum, sugar cane, "Job's tears", and bluestem grasses, is C4. Around 46 percent of grass species are C4 plants.

== Taxonomy ==
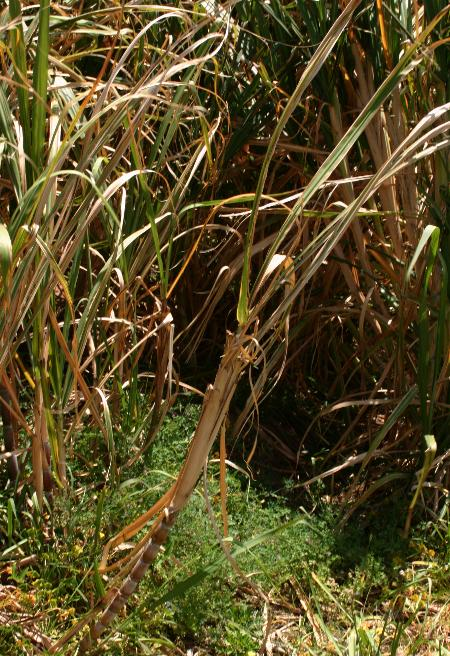
Sugarcane (Saccharum officinarum)

The name Poaceae was given by John Hendley Barnhart in 1895, based on the tribe Poeae described in 1814 by Robert Brown, and the type genus Poa described in 1753 by Carl Linnaeus. The term is derived from the Ancient Greek πόα (póa, "fodder").

=== Evolutionary history ===
Grasses include some of the most versatile plant life-forms. They became widespread toward the end of the Cretaceous period, and fossilized dinosaur dung (coprolites) belonging to the sauropod titanosaurs (though this provenance has been questioned) have been found containing phytoliths of a variety that include grasses that are related to modern rice and bamboo. Grasses have adapted to conditions in lush rain forests, dry deserts, cold mountains and even intertidal habitats, and are currently the most widespread plant type; grass is a valuable source of food and energy for all sorts of wildlife.

A cladogram shows subfamilies and approximate species numbers in brackets:

- - - - - PACMAD clade
          - - - - Chloridoideae (1600)
                - Danthonioideae (300)
              - - Micrairoideae (200)
                - Arundinoideae (50)
            - Panicoideae (3250)
          - Aristidoideae (350)
        - BOP clade
          - Oryzoideae (110)
          - - Bambusoideae – bamboos (1450)
            - Pooideae (3850)
      - Puelioideae (11)
    - Pharoideae (13)
  - Anomochlooideae (4)

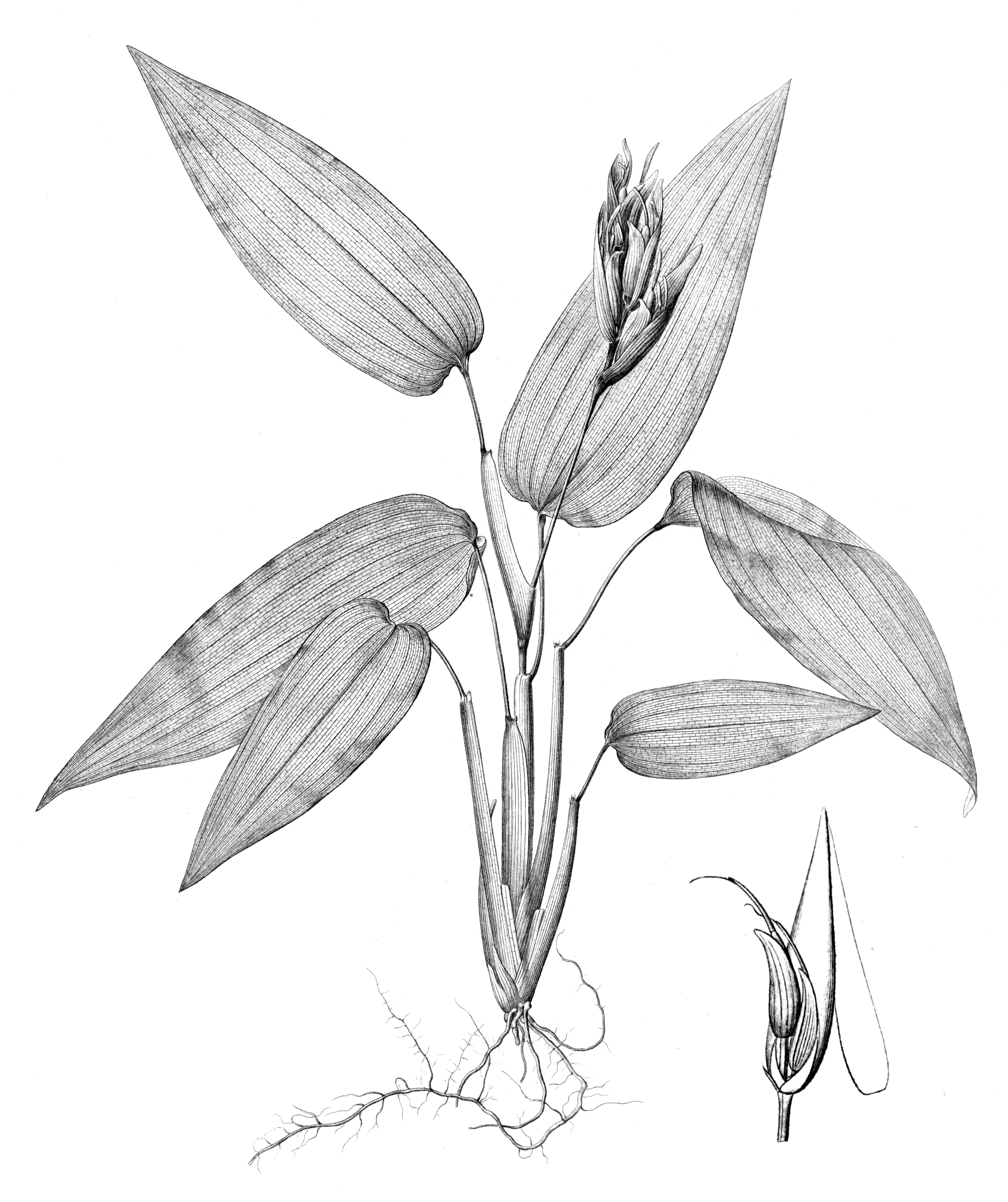
Drawing of Anomochloa marantoidea, one of the most primitive living grass species

Before 2005, fossil findings indicated that grasses evolved around 55 million years ago. Finds of grass-like phytoliths in Cretaceous dinosaur coprolites from the latest Cretaceous (Maastrichtian) aged Lameta Formation of India have pushed this date back to 66 million years ago. Due to high phosphatic content of 12.2-16.2% in Type A coprolites collected from the Lameta, an omnivore is hypothesized to be the source, contradicting the hypothesis of a sauropod origin. In 2011, fossils from the same deposit were found to belong to the modern rice tribe Oryzeae, suggesting substantial diversification of major lineages by this time.

In 2018, a study described grass microfossils extracted from the teeth of the hadrosauroid dinosaur Equijubus normani from northern China, dating to the Albian stage of the Early Cretaceous approximately 113–100 million years ago, which were found to belong to primitive lineages within Poaceae, similar in position to the Anomochlooideae. These are currently the oldest known grass fossils.

Fossils of Phragmites have been found in the Late Cretaceous of North America, particularly in the Maastrichtian aged Laramie Formation. However slightly older fossils of Phragmites have been found in the Eastern coast of the US dating the Campanian (such as in the Black Creek Formation).

The relationships among the three subfamilies Bambusoideae, Oryzoideae and Pooideae in the BOP clade have been resolved: Bambusoideae and Pooideae are more closely related to each other than to Oryzoideae. This separation occurred within the relatively short time span of about 4 million years.

According to Lester Charles King, the spread of grasses in the Late Cenozoic would have changed patterns of hillslope evolution favouring slopes that are convex upslope and concave downslope and lacking a free face were common. King argued that this was the result of more slowly acting surface wash caused by carpets of grass which in turn would have resulted in relatively more soil creep.

=== Subdivisions ===
There are about 12,000 grass species in about 771 genera that are classified into 12 subfamilies. See the full list of Poaceae genera.

- Anomochlooideae Pilg. ex Potztal, a small lineage of broad-leaved grasses that includes two genera (Anomochloa, Streptochaeta)
- Pharoideae L.G.Clark & Judz., a small lineage of grasses of three genera, including Pharus and Leptaspis
- Puelioideae L.G.Clark, M.Kobay., S.Mathews, Spangler & E.A.Kellogg, a small lineage of the African genus Puelia
- Pooideae, including wheat, barley, oats, brome-grass (Bromus), reed-grasses (Calamagrostis) and many lawn and pasture grasses such as bluegrass (Poa)

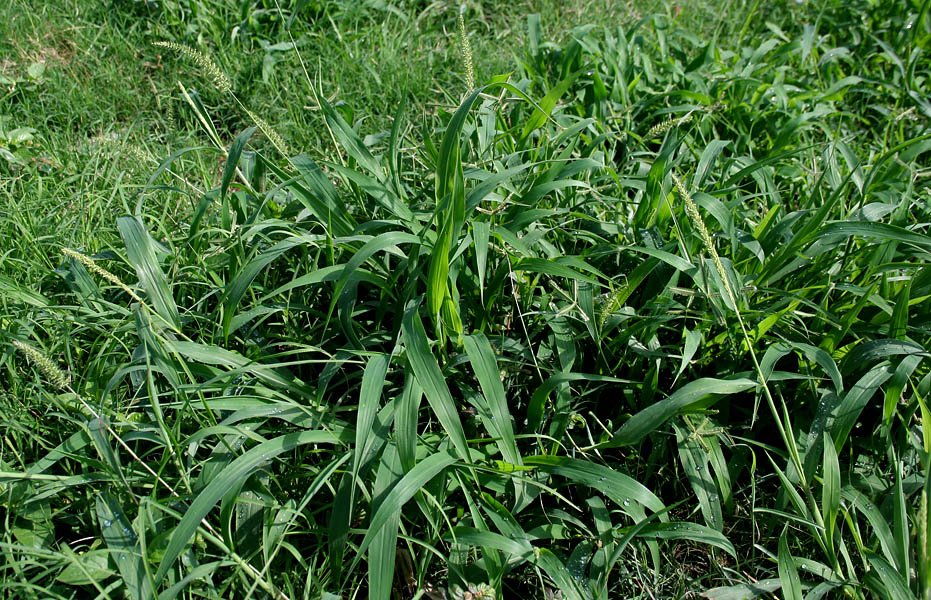
Setaria verticillata from Panicoideae

- Bambusoideae, including bamboo
- Ehrhartoideae, including rice and wild rice
- Aristidoideae, including Aristida
- Arundinoideae, including giant reed and common reed
- Chloridoideae, including the lovegrasses (Eragrostis, about 350 species, including teff), dropseeds (Sporobolus, some 160 species), finger millet (Eleusine coracana (L.) Gaertn.), and the muhly grasses (Muhlenbergia, about 175 species)
- Panicoideae, including panic grass, maize, sorghum, sugarcane, most millets, fonio, "Job's tears", and bluestem grasses
- Micrairoideae
- Danthonioideae, including pampas grass

== Distribution ==
The grass family is one of the most widely distributed and abundant groups of plants on Earth. Grasses are found on every continent, including Antarctica. The Antarctic hair grass, Deschampsia antarctica is one of only two flowering plant species native to the western Antarctic Peninsula.

== Ecology ==
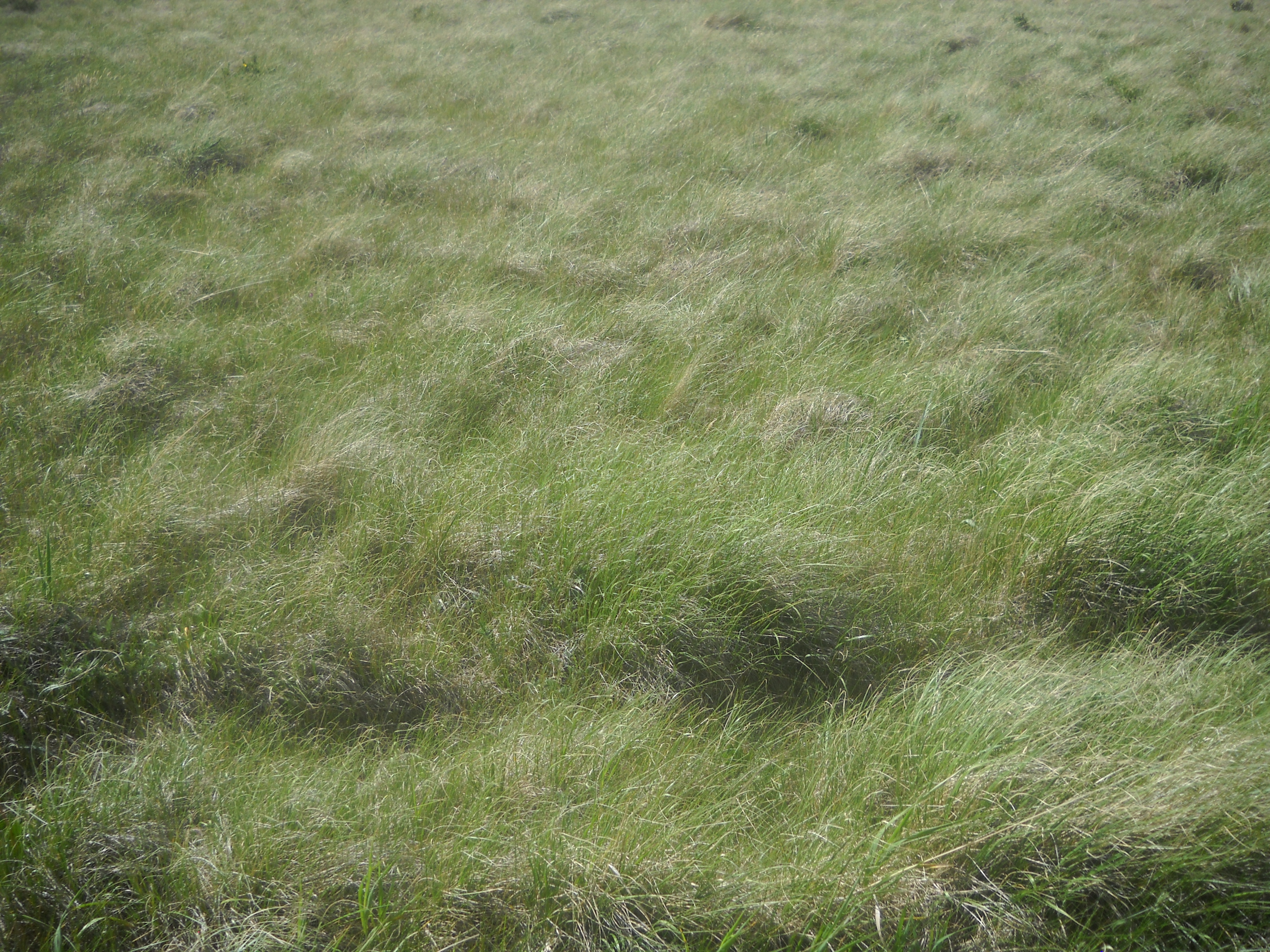
Wind-blown grass in the Valles Caldera in New Mexico, United States

Grasses are the dominant vegetation in many habitats, including grassland, salt-marsh, reedswamp and steppes. They also occur as a smaller part of the vegetation in almost every other terrestrial habitat. Grass-dominated biomes are called grasslands. If only large, contiguous areas of grasslands are counted, these biomes cover 31% of the planet's land. Grasslands include pampas, steppes, and prairies. Grasses provide food to many grazing mammals, as well as to many species of butterflies and moths. Many types of animals eat grass as their main source of food, and are called graminivores – these include cattle, sheep, horses, rabbits and many invertebrates, such as grasshoppers and the caterpillars of many brown butterflies. Grasses are also eaten by omnivorous or even occasionally by primarily carnivorous animals.

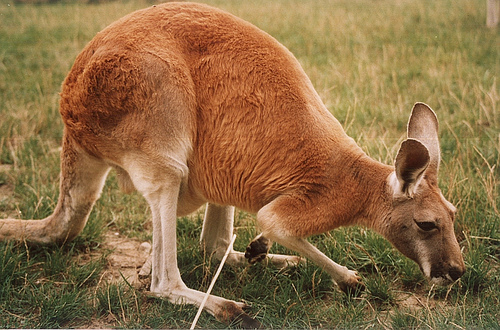
A kangaroo eating grass

Grasses dominate certain biomes, especially temperate grasslands, because many species are adapted to grazing and fire.

Grasses are unusual in that the meristem is near the bottom of the plant; hence, grasses can quickly recover from cropping at the top. The evolution of large grazing animals in the Cenozoic contributed to the spread of grasses. Without large grazers, fire-cleared areas are quickly colonized by grasses, and with enough rain, tree seedlings. Trees eventually outcompete most grasses. Trampling grazers kill seedling trees but not grasses.

== Sexual reproduction and meiosis ==
Sexual reproduction and meiosis have been studied in rice, maize, wheat and barley. Meiosis research in these crop species is linked to crop improvement, since meiotic recombination is an important component of plant breeding. Unlike in animals, the specification of both male and female plant germlines occurs late in development during flowering. The transition from the sporophyte phase to the gametophyte state is initiated by meiotic entry.

== Uses ==
Grasses are, in human terms, perhaps the most economically important plant family. Their economic importance stems from several areas, including food production, industry, and lawns. They have been grown agriculturally for up to 15,000 years and the grains of grasses such as wheat, rice, maize (corn) and barley have been the most important human food crops. Grasses are also used in the manufacture of thatch, paper, fuel, clothing, insulation, timber for fencing, furniture, scaffolding and construction materials, floor matting, sports turf and baskets.

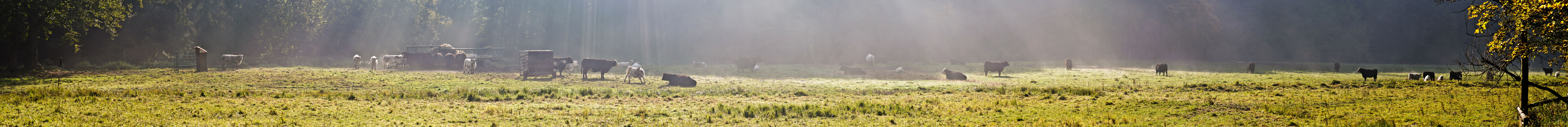
Grazing cattle on a pasture near Hradec nad Moravicí in Czech Silesia.

=== Food production ===
Of all crops grown, 70% are grasses. Agricultural grasses grown for their edible seeds are called cereals or grains (although the latter term, when used agriculturally, refers to both cereals and similar seeds of other plant species, such as buckwheat and legumes). Three cereals—rice, wheat, and maize (corn)—provide more than half of all calories consumed by humans. Cereals constitute the major source of carbohydrates for humans and perhaps the major source of protein; these include rice (in southern and eastern Asia), maize (in Central and South America), and wheat and barley (in Europe, northern Asia and the Americas).

Sugarcane is the major source of sugar production. Additional food uses of sugarcane include sprouted grain, shoots, and rhizomes, and in drink they include sugarcane juice and plant milk, as well as rum, beer, whisky, and vodka.

Bamboo shoots are used in numerous Asian dishes and broths, and are available in supermarkets in various sliced forms, in both fresh, fermented and canned versions.

Lemongrass is a grass used as a culinary herb for its citrus-like flavor and scent.

Many species of grass are grown as pasture for foraging or as fodder for prescribed livestock feeds, particularly in the case of cattle, horses, and sheep. Such grasses may be cut and stored for later feeding, especially for the winter, in the form of bales of hay or straw, or in silos as silage. Straw (and sometimes hay) may also be used as bedding for animals.

An example of a sod-forming perennial grass used in agriculture is Thinopyrum intermedium.

=== Industry ===
Grasses are used as raw material for a multitude of purposes, including construction and in the composition of building materials such as cob, for insulation, in the manufacture of paper and board such as oriented structural straw board. Grass fiber can be used for making paper, biofuel production, nonwoven fabrics, and as replacement for glass fibers used in reinforced plastics. Bamboo scaffolding is able to withstand typhoon-force winds that would break steel scaffolding. Larger bamboos and Arundo donax have stout culms that can be used in a manner similar to timber, Arundo is used to make reeds for woodwind instruments, and bamboo is used for innumerable implements.

Phragmites australis (common reed) is important for thatching and wall construction of homes in Africa. Grasses are used in water treatment systems, in wetland conservation and land reclamation, and used to lessen the erosional impact of urban storm water runoff.

=== Palaeoecological reconstructions ===
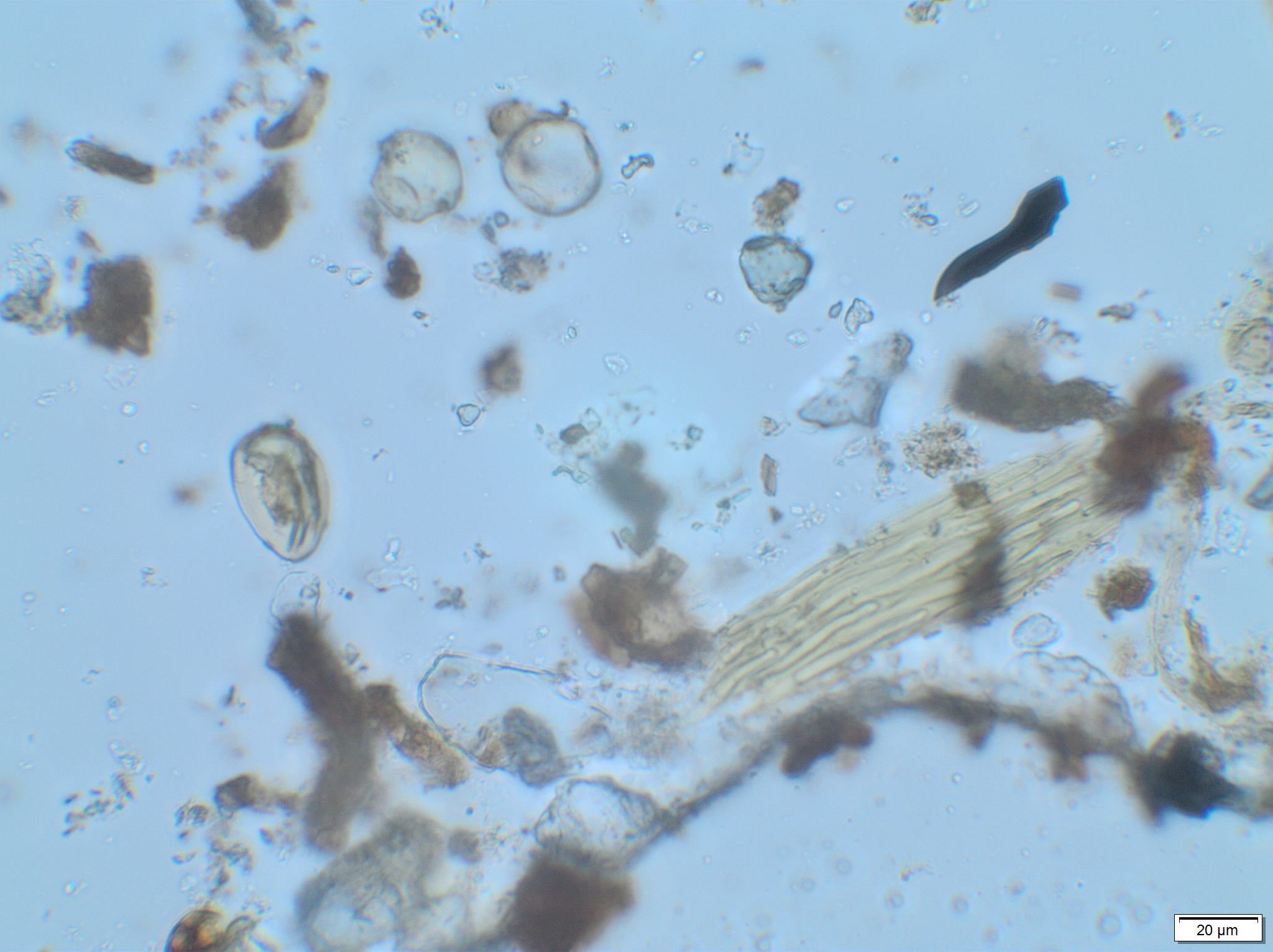
Processed, fossilised pollen from the family Poaceae. Species unknown

Pollen morphology, particularly in the Poaceae family, is key to figuring out their evolutionary relationships and how environments have changed over time. Grass pollen grains, however, often look the same, making it hard to use them for detailed climate or environmental reconstructions. Grass pollen has a single pore and can vary a lot in size, from about 20 to over 100 micrometers, and this size difference has been looked into for clues about past habitats, to tell apart domesticated grasses from wild ones, and to indicate various biological features like how they perform photosynthesis, their breeding systems, and genetic complexity. Yet, there's ongoing debate about how effective pollen size is for piecing together historical landscapes and weather patterns, considering other factors such as genetic material amount might also affect pollen size. Despite these challenges, new techniques in Fourier-Transform Infrared Spectroscopy and improved statistical methods are now helping to better identify these similar-looking pollen types.

=== Lawn and ornamental use ===
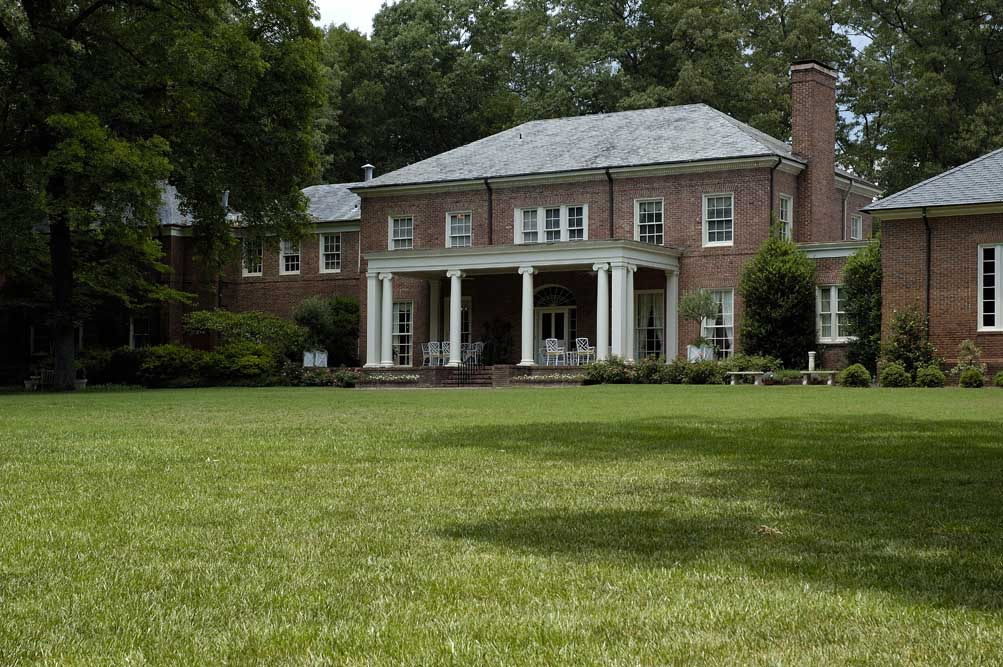
A lawn in front of a building

Grasses are the primary plants used in lawns, which themselves derive from grazed grasslands in Europe. They also provide an important means of erosion control (e.g. along roadsides), especially on sloping land. Grass lawns are an important covering of playing surfaces in many sports, including football (soccer), American football, tennis, golf, cricket, softball and baseball.

Ornamental grasses, such as perennial bunch grasses, are used in many styles of garden design for their foliage, inflorescences and seed heads. They are often used in natural landscaping, xeriscaping and slope and beach stabilization in contemporary landscaping, wildlife gardening, and native plant gardening. They are used as screens and hedges.

=== Sports turf ===
Grass playing fields, courses and pitches are the traditional playing surfaces for many sports, including American football, association football, baseball, cricket, golf, and rugby. Grass surfaces are also sometimes used for horse racing and tennis. Type of maintenance and species of grass used may be important factors for some sports, less critical for others. In some sports facilities, including indoor domes and other places where maintenance of a grass field would be difficult, grass may be replaced with artificial turf, a synthetic grass-like substitute.

==== Cricket ====
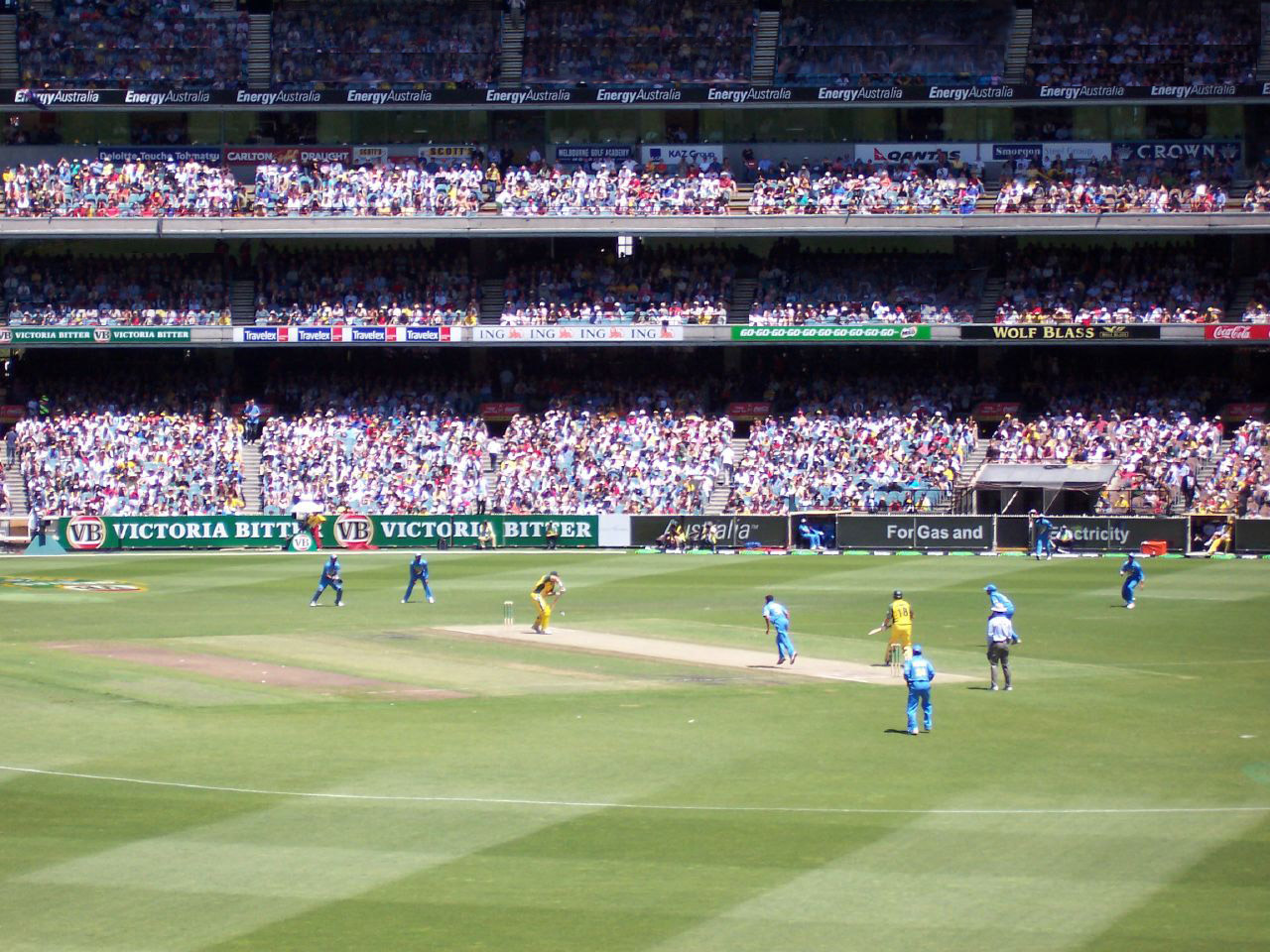
The gray area is the cricket pitch currently in use. Parallel to it are other pitches in various states of preparation which could be used in other matches.

In cricket, the pitch is the strip of carefully mowed and rolled grass where the bowler bowls. In the days leading up to the match it is repeatedly mowed and rolled to produce a very hard, flat surface for the ball to bounce off.

==== Golf ====
Grass on golf courses is kept in three distinct conditions: that of the rough, the fairway, and the putting green. Grass on the fairway is mown short and even, allowing the player to strike the ball cleanly. Playing from the rough is a disadvantage because the long grass may affect the flight of the ball. Grass on the putting green is the shortest and most even, ideally allowing the ball to roll smoothly over the surface. An entire industry revolves around the development and marketing of turf grass varieties.

==== Tennis ====
In tennis, grass is grown on very hard-packed soil, and the bounce of a tennis ball may vary depending on the grass's health, how recently it has been mowed, and the wear and tear of recent play. The surface is softer than hard courts and clay (other tennis surfaces), so the ball bounces lower, and players must reach the ball faster resulting in a different style of play which may suit some players more than others. Among the world's most prestigious court for grass tennis is Centre Court at Wimbledon, London, which hosts the final of the annual Wimbledon Championships in England, one of the four Grand Slam tournaments.

=== Economically important grasses ===
Grain crops	Leaf and stem crops	Lawn grasses	Ornamental grasses (Horticultural)	Model organisms
Barley; Maize (corn); Oats; Rice; Rye; Sorghum; Wheat; Millet	Bamboo; Marram grass; Meadow-grass; Reeds; Ryegrass; Sugarcane	Bahiagrass; Bentgrass; Bermudagrass; Bluegrass; Buffalograss; Centipede grass; Fescue; Ryegrass; St. Augustine grass; Zoysia	Calamagrostis spp.; Cortaderia spp.; Deschampsia spp.; Festuca spp.; Melica spp.; Muhlenbergia spp.; Stipa spp.	Brachypodium distachyon; Maize (corn); Rice; Sorghum; Wheat

A number of grasses are invasive species that damage natural ecosystems, including forms of Phragmites australis which are native to Eurasia but has spread around the world.

== Role in society ==
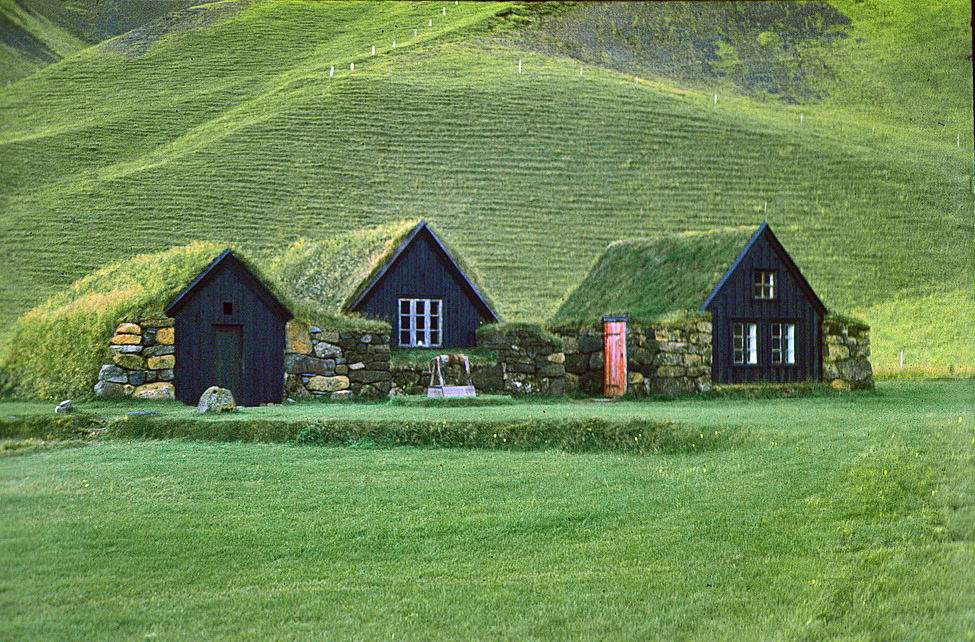
Grass-covered houses in Iceland

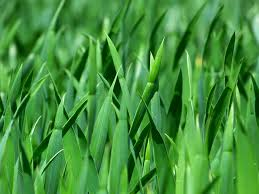
Typical grass seen in meadows

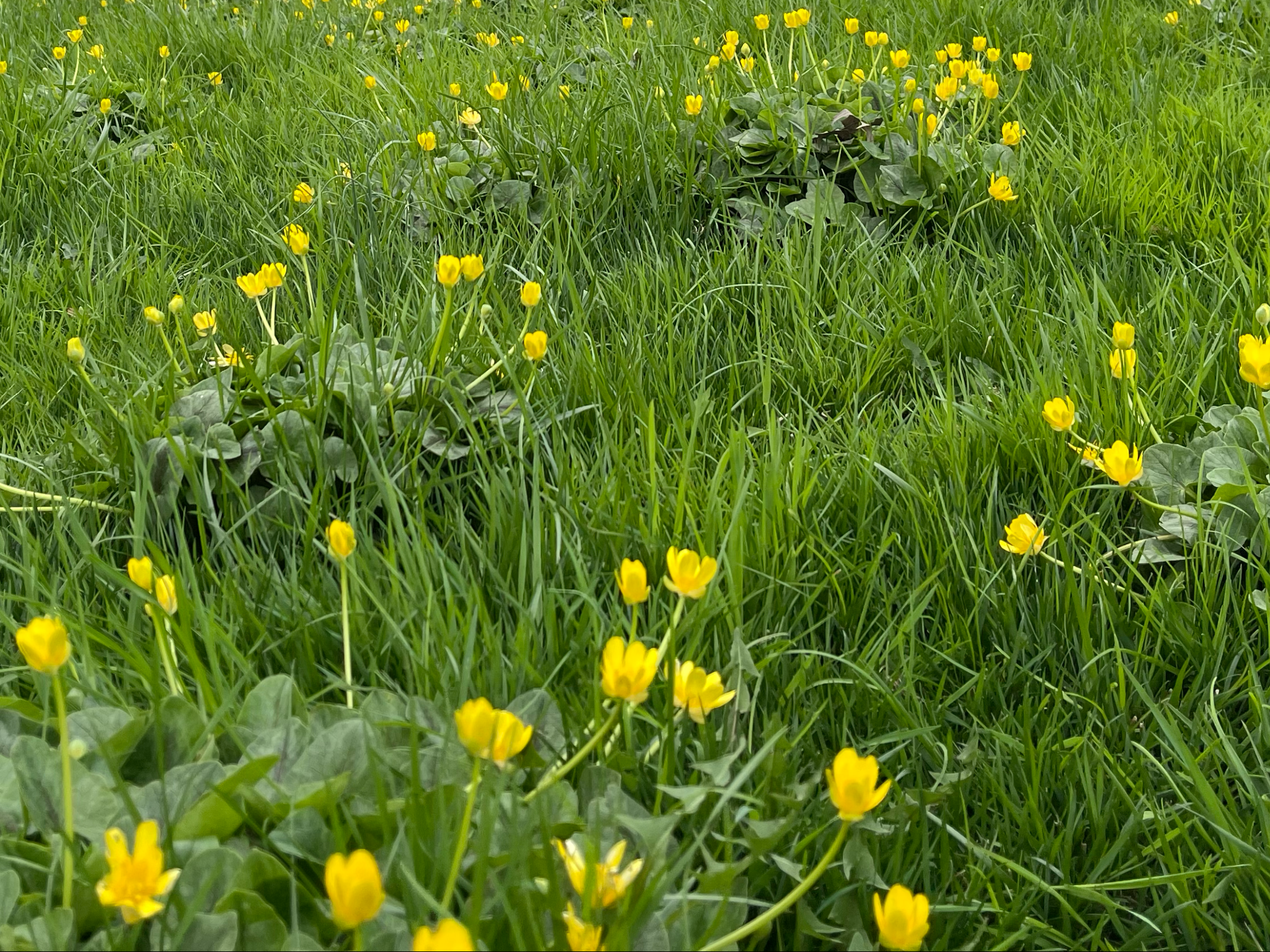
Grass with non-grass flowers around it

Grasses have long had significance in human society. They have been cultivated as feed for people and domesticated animals for thousands of years. The primary ingredient of beer is usually barley or wheat, each of which has been used for this purpose for over 4,000 years.

In some places, particularly in suburban areas, the maintenance of a grass lawn is a sign of a homeowner's responsibility to the overall appearance of their neighborhood. One work credits lawn maintenance to:

...the desire for upward mobility and its manifestation in the lawn. As Virginia Jenkins, author of The Lawn, put it quite bluntly, "Upper middle-class Americans emulated aristocratic society with their own small, semi-rural estates." In general, the lawn was one of the primary selling points of these new suburban homes, as it shifted social class designations from the equity and ubiquity of urban homes connected to the streets with the upper-middle class designation of a "healthy" green space and the status symbol that is the front lawn.

In communities with drought problems, watering of lawns may be restricted to certain times of day or days of the week. Many US municipalities and homeowners' associations have rules that require lawns to be maintained to certain specifications, sanctioning those who allow the grass to grow too long.

The smell of freshly cut grass is produced mainly by cis-3-Hexenal.

Some common aphorisms involve grass. For example:

- "The grass is always greener on the other side" suggests an alternate state of affairs will always seem preferable to one's own.
- "Don't let the grass grow under your feet" tells someone to get moving.
- "A snake in the grass" means dangers that are hidden.
- "When elephants fight, it is the grass that suffers" tells of bystanders caught in the crossfire.

A folk myth about grass is that it refuses to grow where any violent death has occurred.

== Image gallery ==
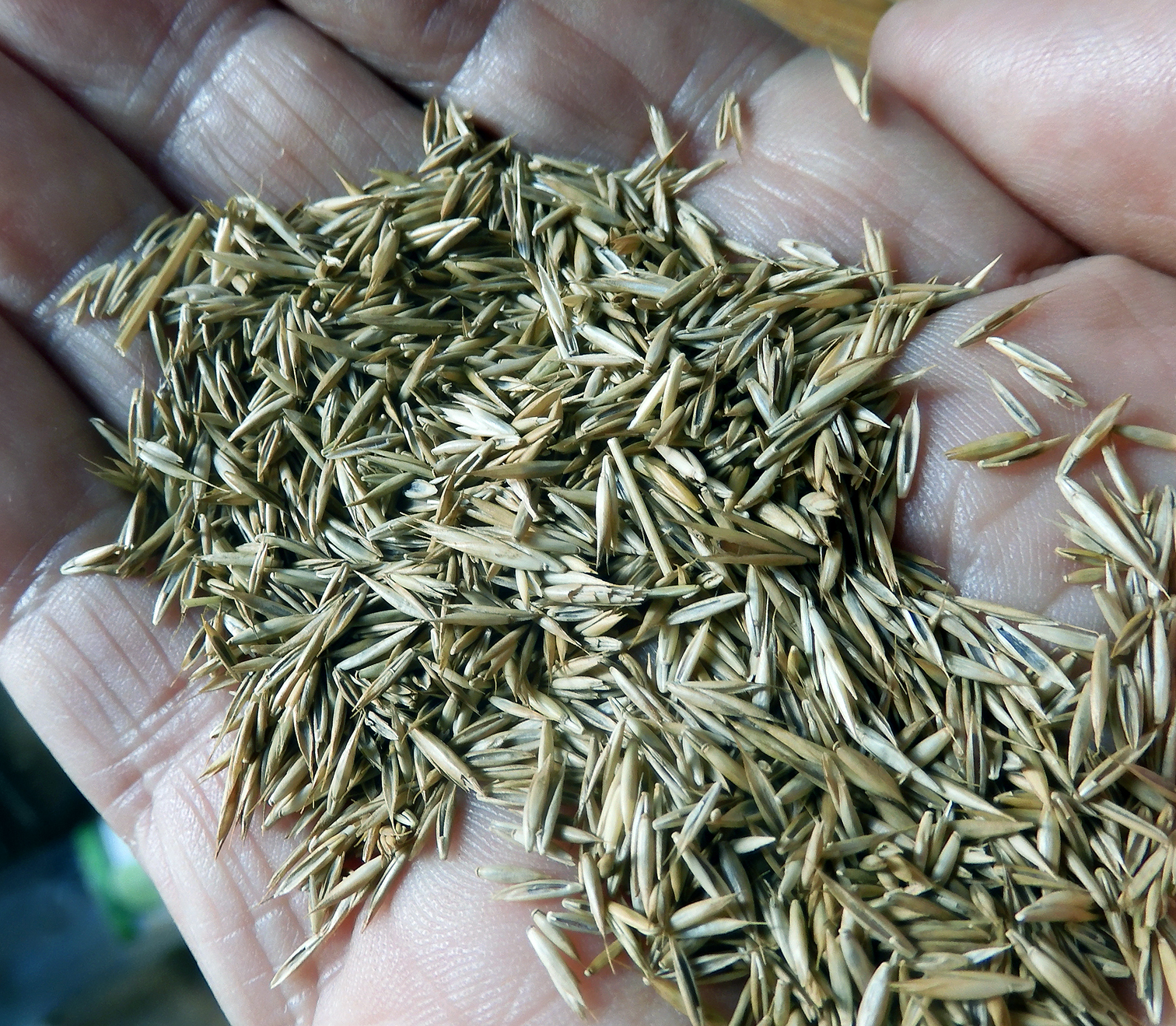
Grass seeds, a mixture of 90% Festuca rubra and 10% Festuca ovina.

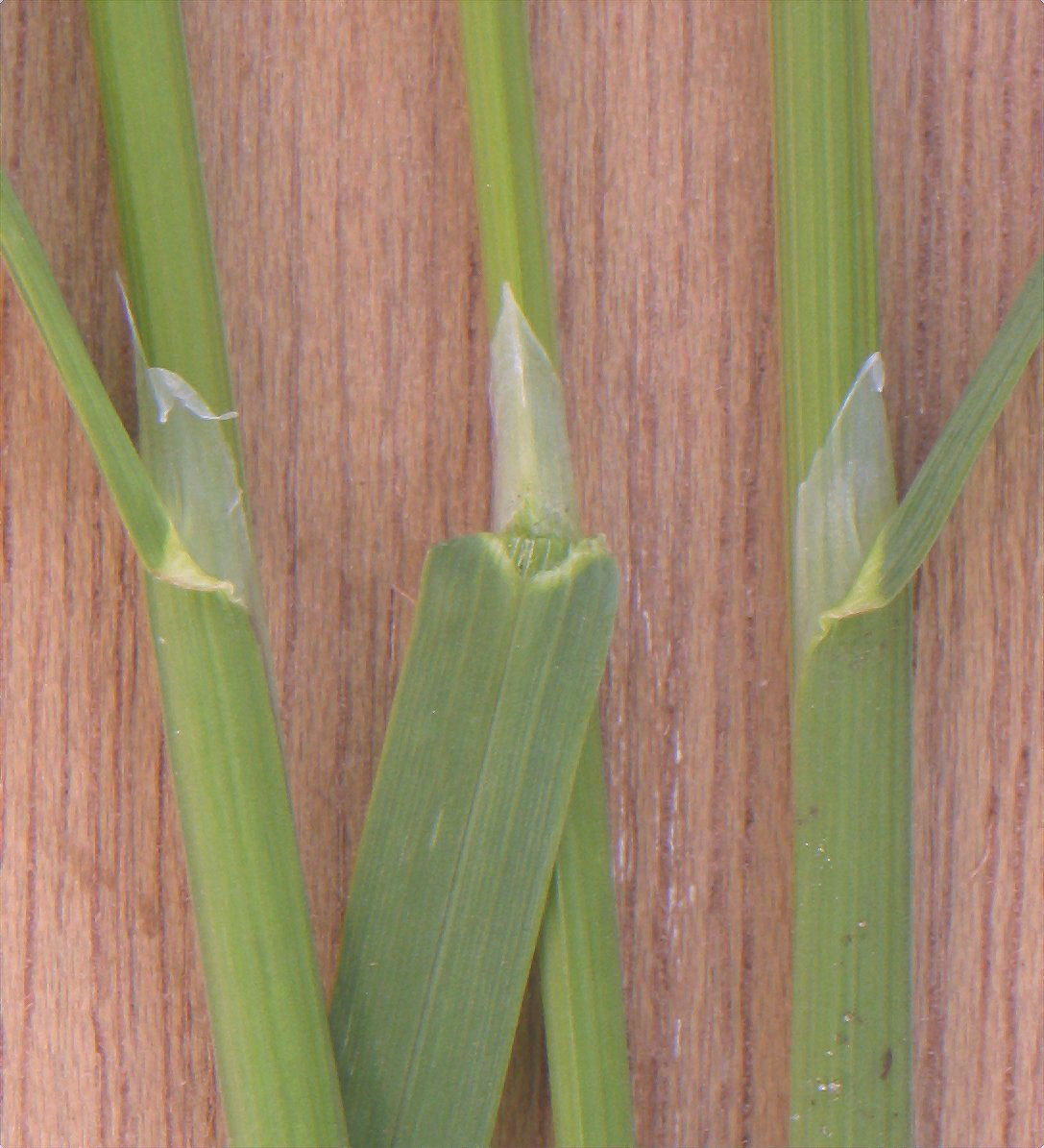
Leaves of Poa trivialis showing the ligules

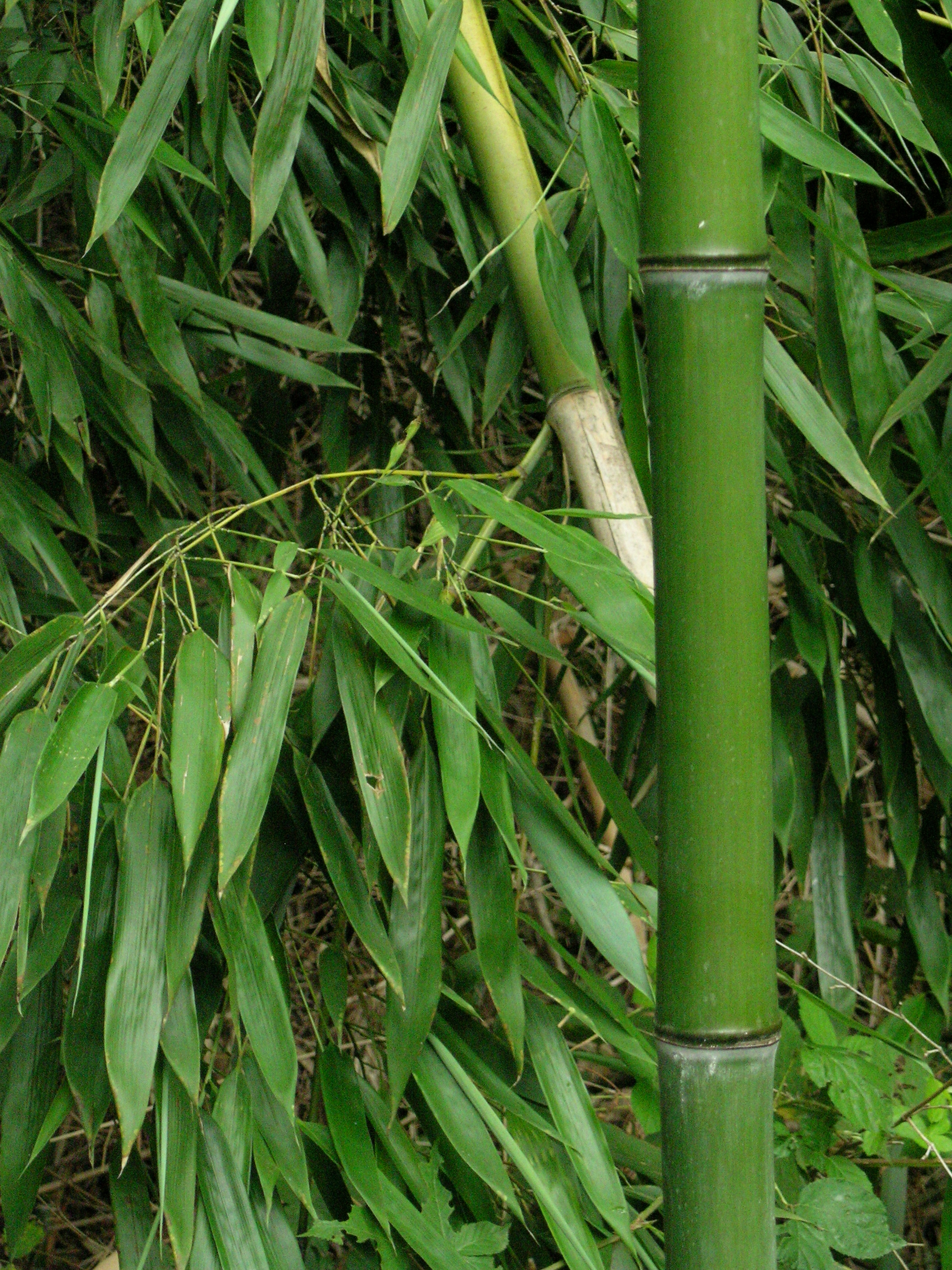
Bamboo stem and leaves, nodes are evident

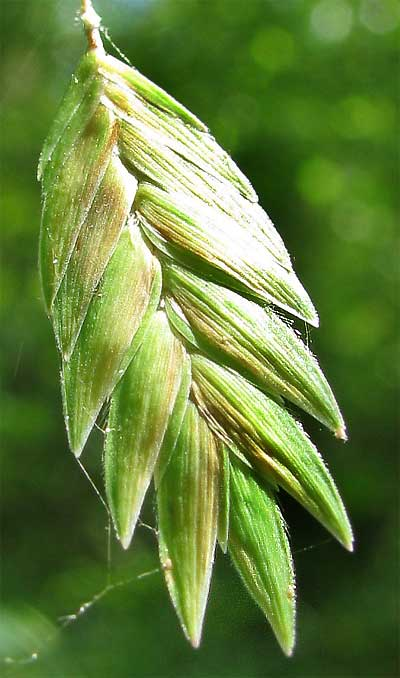
A Chasmanthium latifolium spikelet

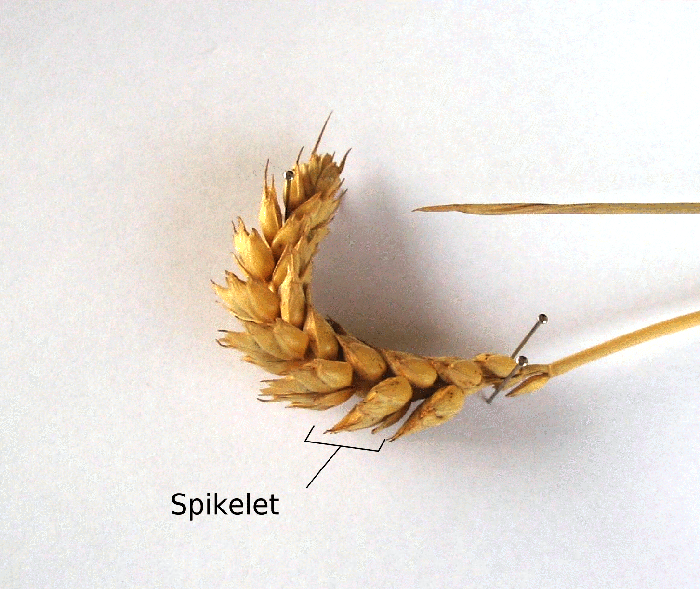
Wheat spike and spikelet

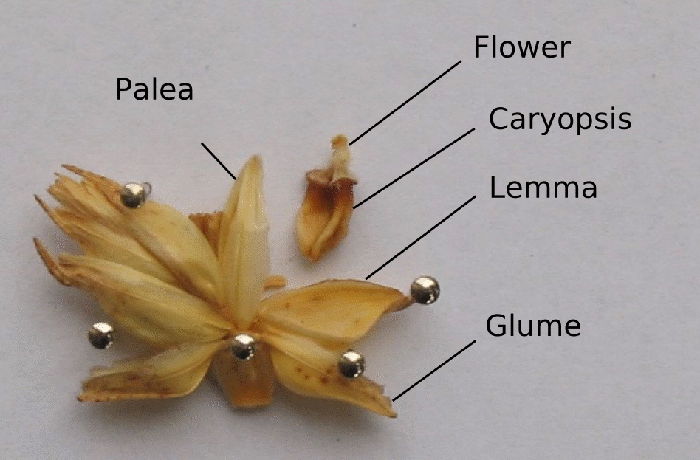
Spikelet opened to show caryopsis

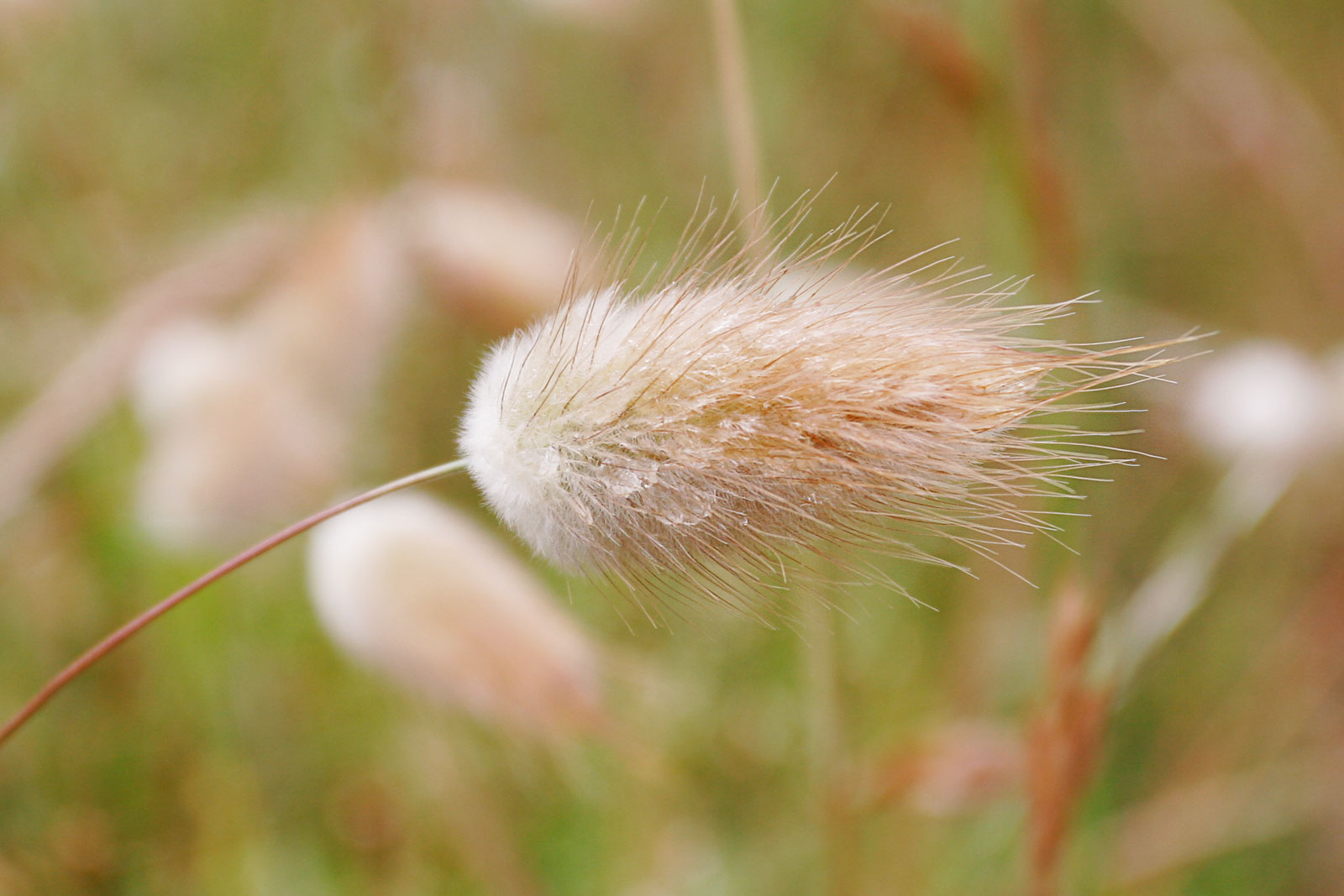
Harestail grass

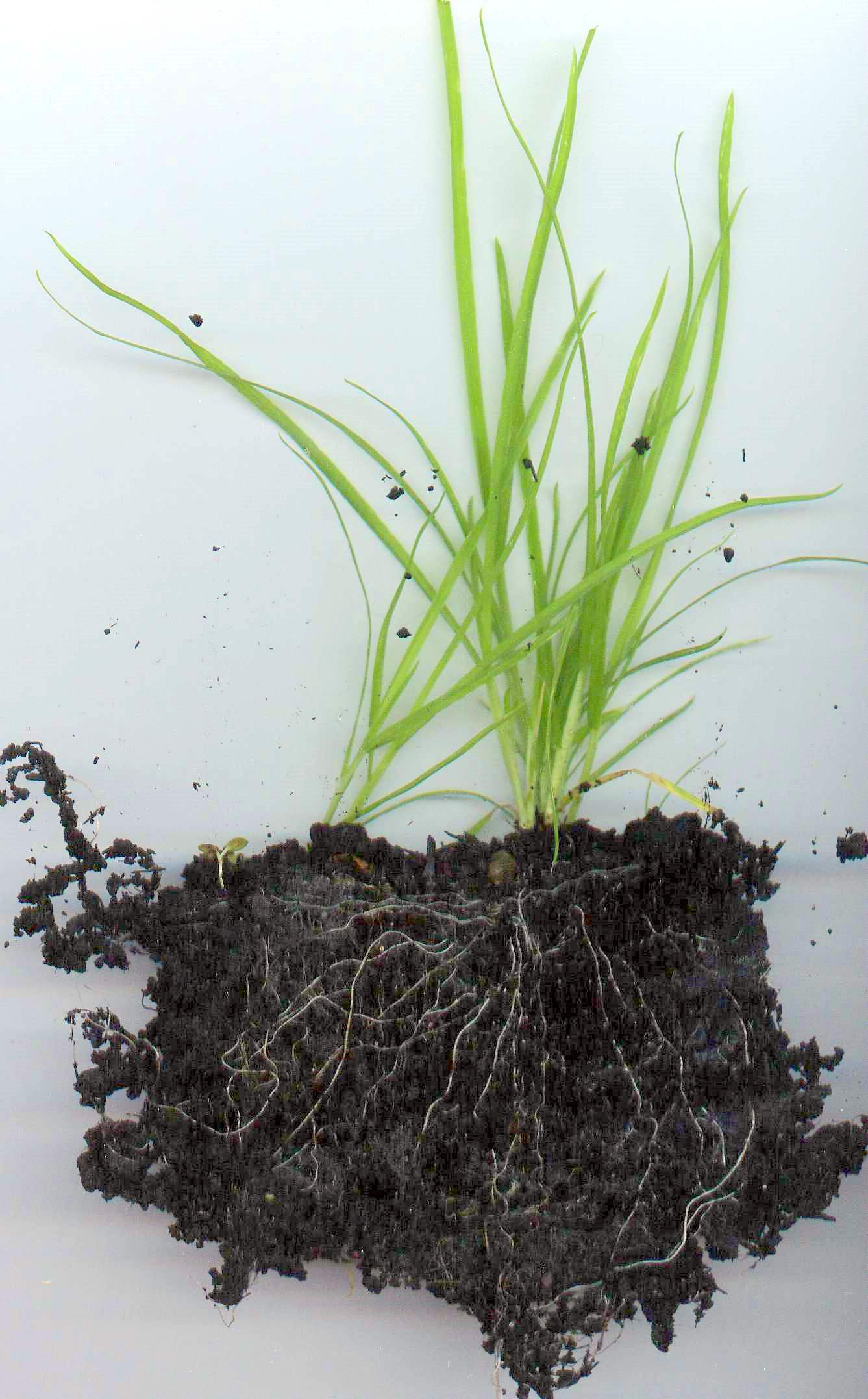
Grass

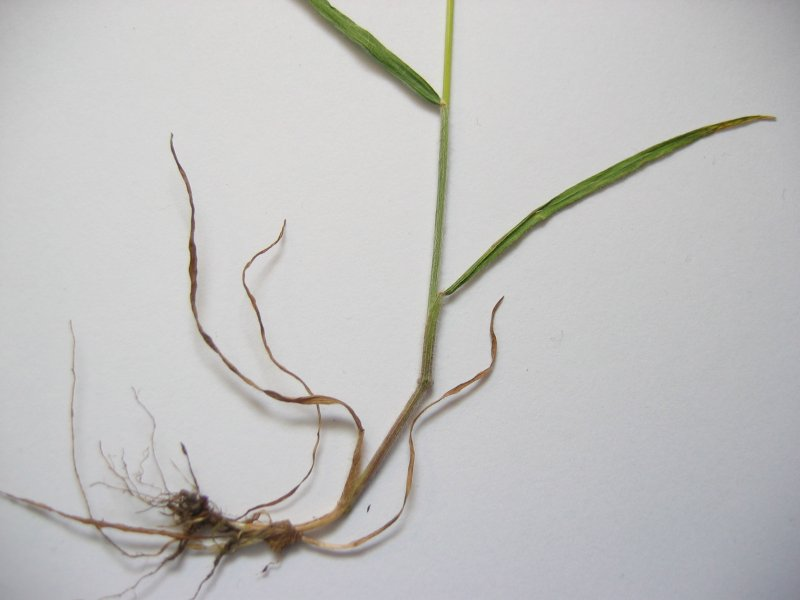
Roots of Bromus hordeaceus

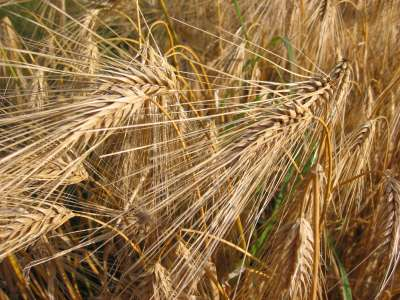
Barley mature spikes (Hordeum vulgare)

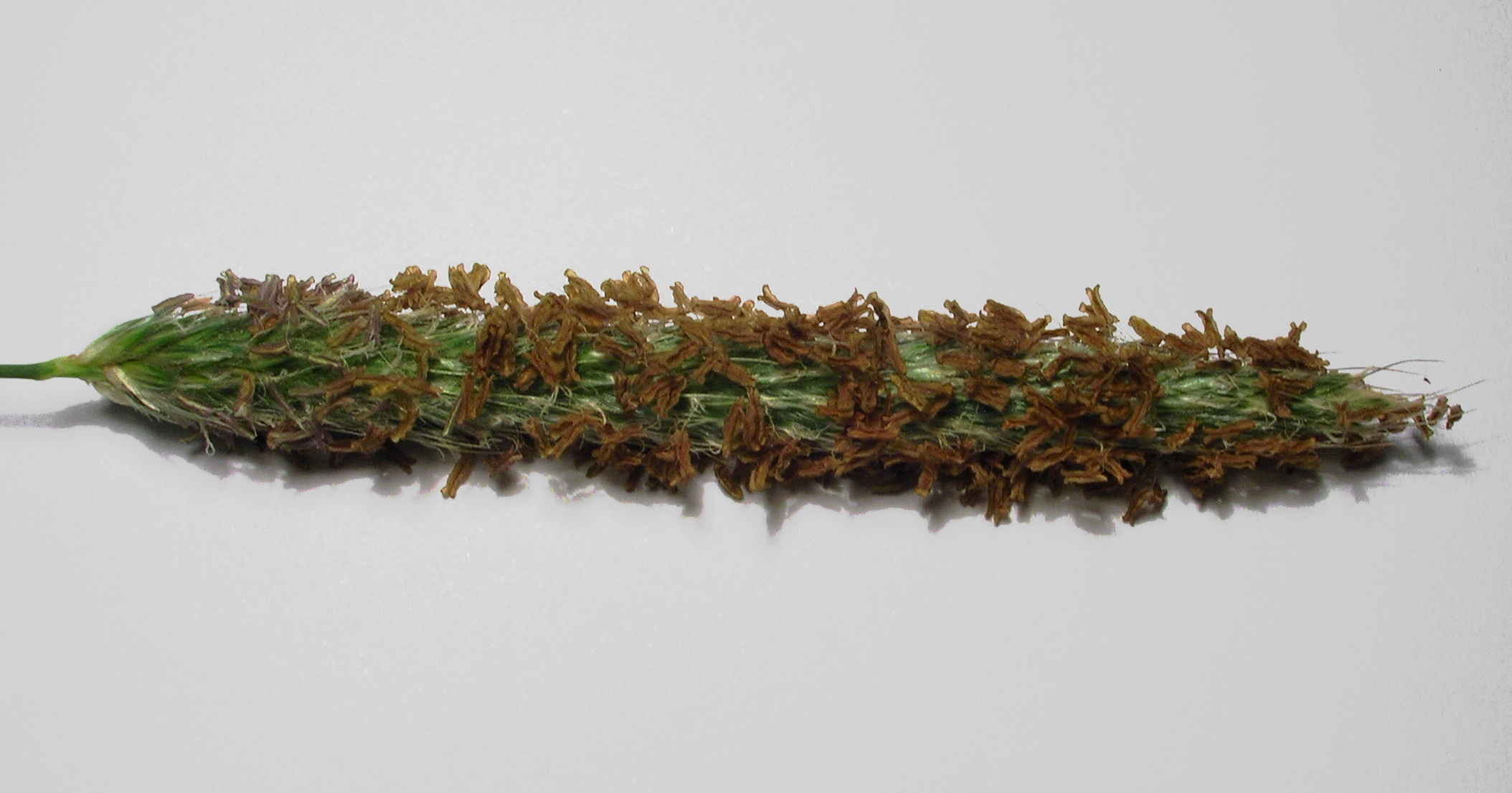
A grass flower head (meadow foxtail) showing the plain-coloured flowers with large anthers

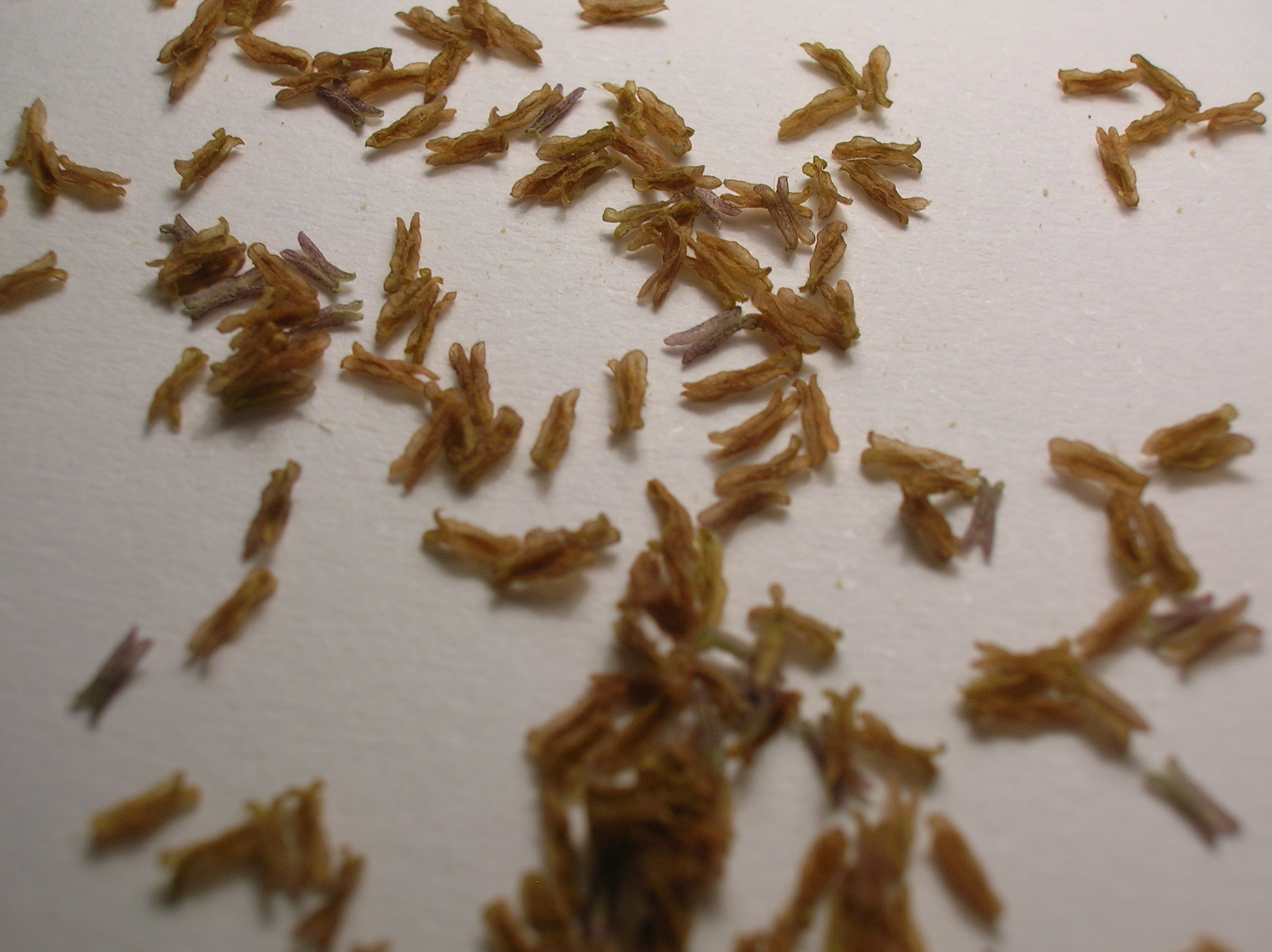
Anthers detached from a meadow foxtail flower

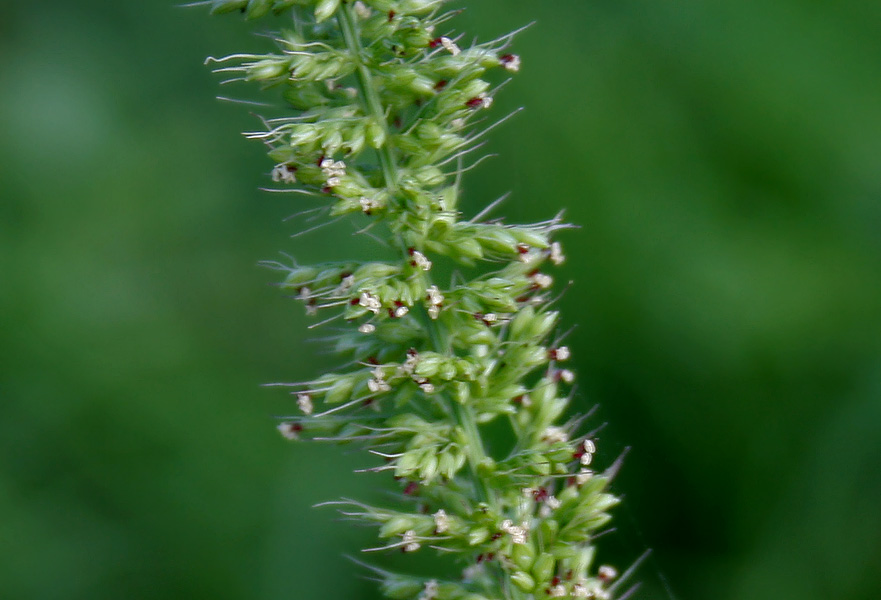
Setaria verticillata, bristly foxtail

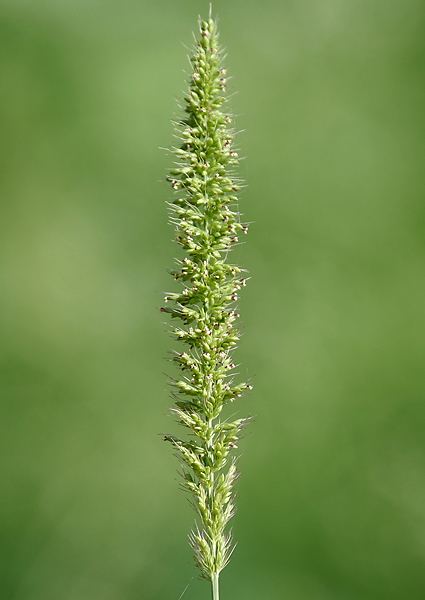
Setaria verticillata, bristly foxtail

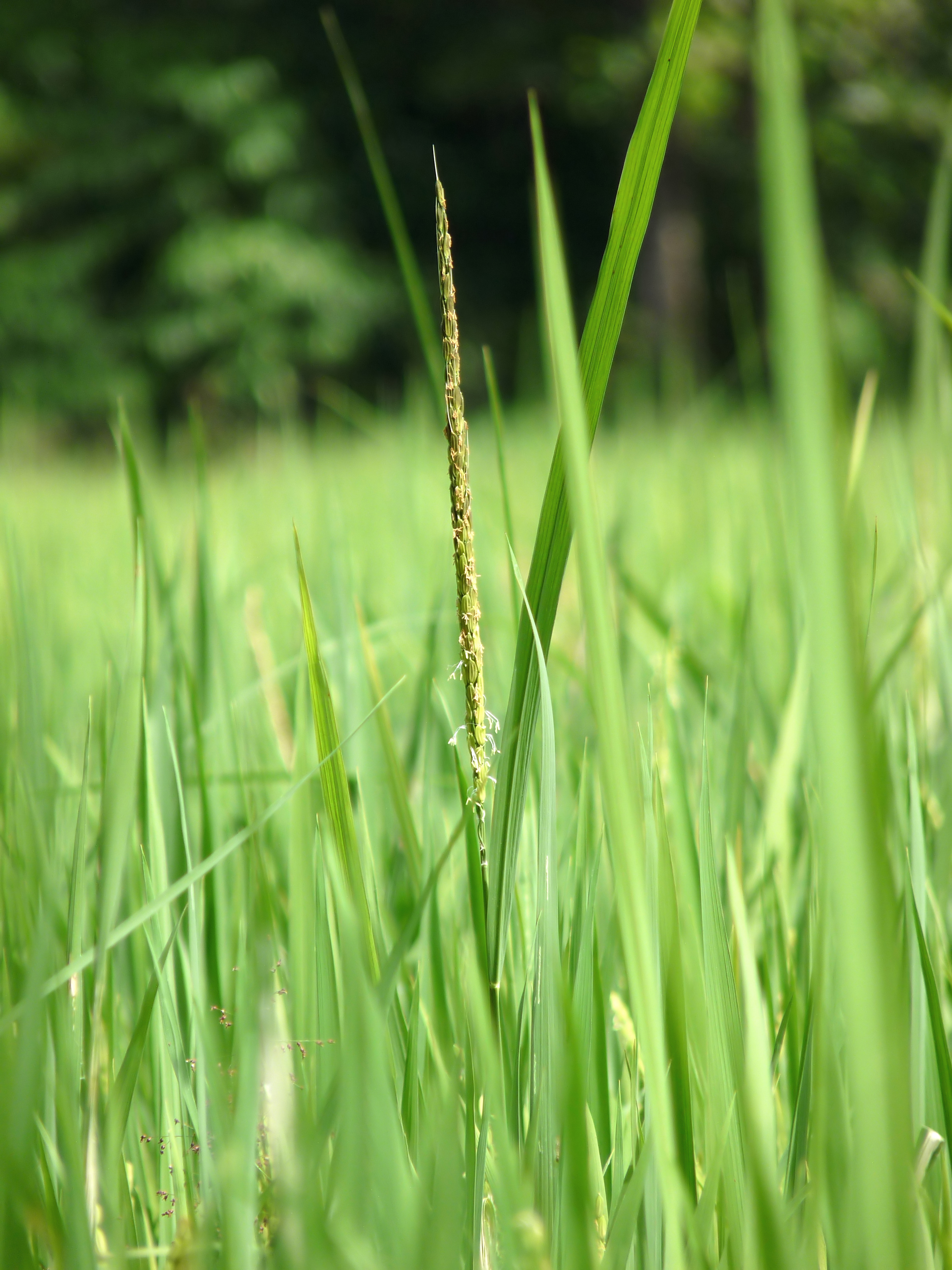
Oryza sativa, Kerala, India

== See also ==
- Agrostology – Scientific study of the grasses
- Forb – Herbaceous, broad-leaved flowering plant
- GrassBase – Database of grasses
- Green track – Railway trackbed planted with grass or other vegetation
- PACMAD clade – Major clade in the grass family Poaceae
