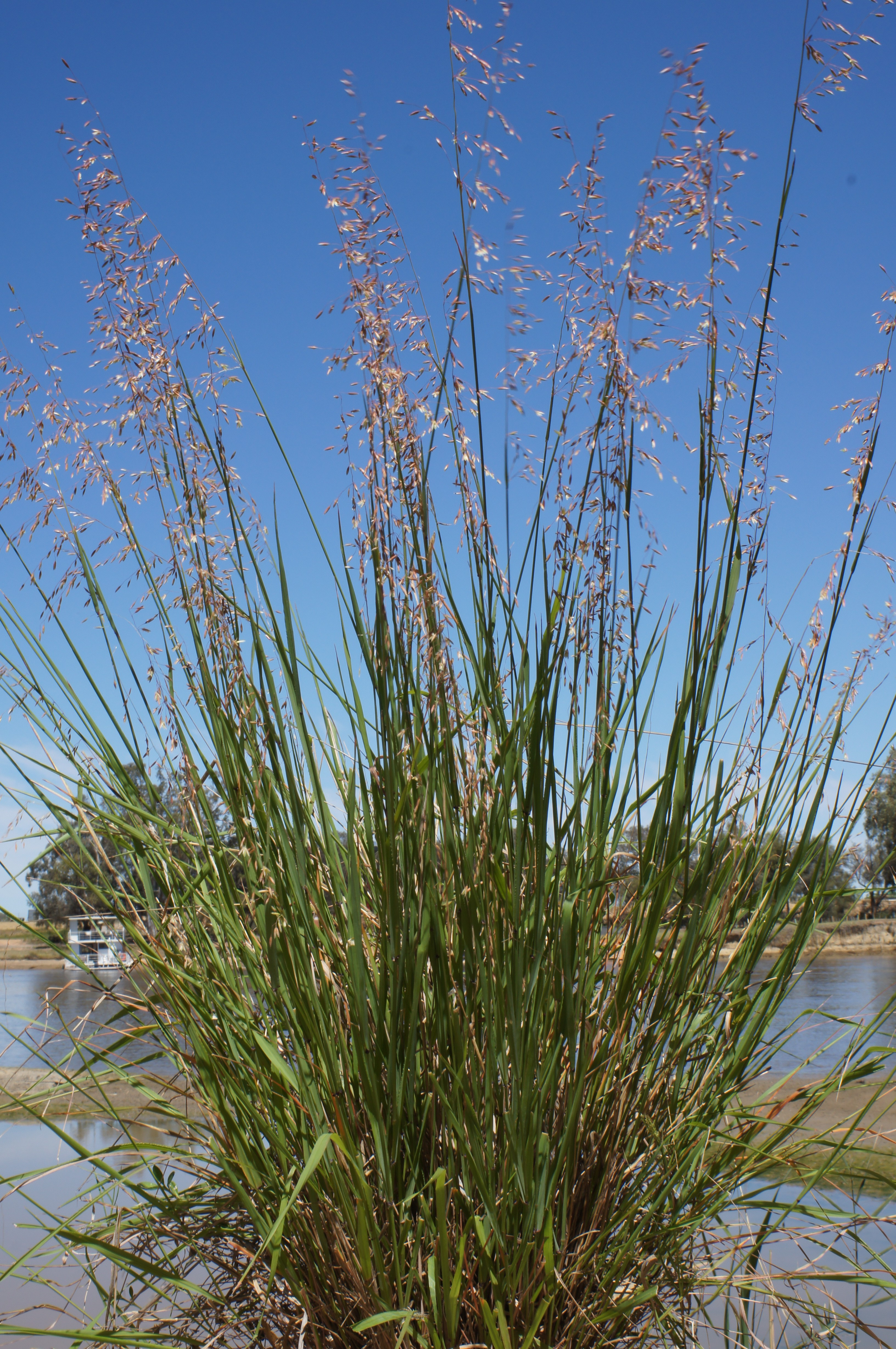
- Ehrharta calycina

Scientific classification
- Kingdom: Plantae
- Clade: Tracheophytes
- Clade: Angiosperms
- Clade: Monocots
- Clade: Commelinids
- Order: Poales
- Family: Poaceae
- Subfamily: Oryzoideae
- Tribe: Ehrharteae
- Genus: Ehrharta; Thunb.

Type species
- Ehrharta capensis Thunb.

Synonyms
- Diplax Sol. ex Benn.; Trochera L.C.M.Richard

= Ehrharta =

Genus of grasses

Ehrharta is a genus of plants in the grass family.

Most of the species are native to Africa, with others native to the southern Arabian Peninsula, Maluku Islands, Fiji, and New Zealand. Several including Ehrharta longiflora, Ehrharta calycina and Ehrharta erecta have been introduced to parts of North and South America, Europe, India, and Australia, and are considered invasive weeds.

Common names for this genus include veldtgrass.

This genus was named for the German botanist Jakob Friedrich Ehrhart, 1742–1795.

== Species ==
28 species are accepted.

- Ehrharta barbinodis Nees - Cape Province
- Ehrharta brevifolia Schrad. - Cape Province, Namibia
- Ehrharta bulbosa Sm. - Cape Province
- Ehrharta calycina Sm. - Cape Province, Namibia, Free State, Lesotho, KwaZulu-Natal; naturalized in Mediterranean, Australia, New Zealand, USA (California, Nevada, Texas)
- Ehrharta capensis Thunb. - Cape Province; naturalized in India
- Ehrharta delicatula Stapf - Cape Province, Namibia
- Ehrharta digyna Thunb. - Cape Province
- Ehrharta diplax F.Muell. - Sulawesi, New Guinea, New Zealand incl Antipodes, Fiji, Society Is
- Ehrharta dura Nees - Cape Province
- Ehrharta eburnea Gibbs Russ. - Cape Province
- Ehrharta erecta Lam. - from Eritrea + Saudi Arabia to Cape Province; naturalized in scattered locations in Asia, Australia, New Zealand, California
- Ehrharta festucacea Willd. ex Schult. & Schult.f. - Madagascar
- Ehrharta godefroyi C.Cordem. - Réunion
- Ehrharta longiflora Sm. - South Africa, Namibia; naturalized in Cape Verde, St. Helena, Canary Islands, Réunion, India, Australia, New Zealand, California
- Ehrharta longifolia Schrad. - Cape Province
- Ehrharta longigluma C.E.Hubb. - South Africa, Lesotho
- Ehrharta melicoides Thunb. - Cape Province
- Ehrharta microlaena Nees - Cape Province
- Ehrharta ottonis Kuntze ex Nees - Cape Province
- Ehrharta penicillata C.Cordem. - Réunion
- Ehrharta pusilla Nees - Cape Province, Namibia
- Ehrharta ramosa Thunb. - Cape Province
- Ehrharta rehmannii Stapf - Cape Province
- Ehrharta rupestris Nees - Cape Province
- Ehrharta setacea Nees - Cape Province
- Ehrharta thunbergii Gibbs Russ. - Cape Province, Namibia
- Ehrharta triandra Nees - Cape Province, Namibia
- Ehrharta villosa Schult.f. - Cape Province; naturalised in Australia, New Zealand North Island, Argentina

=== Formerly included ===
Several species are now placed in other genera, including Brylkinia, Leersia, Melinis, Microlaena, Sporobolus, Tetrarrhena, Tristachya, and Zotovia.

- Ehrharta acuminata (R.Br.) Spreng. – Tetrarrhena acuminata R.Br.
- Ehrharta caudata - Brylkinia caudata
- Ehrharta clandestina - Leersia oryzoides
- Ehrharta colensoi - Zotovia colensoi
- Ehrharta distichophylla Labill. - Tetrarrhena distichophylla (Labill.) R.Br.
- Ehrharta hispida - Tristachya leucothrix
- Ehrharta juncea (R.Br.) Spreng. - Tetrarrhena juncea R.Br.
- Ehrharta laevis (R.Br.) Spreng. - Tetrarrhena laevis R.Br.
- Ehrharta multinoda - Microlaena polynoda
- Ehrharta oreophila (D.I.Morris) L.P.M.Willemse - Tetrarrhena oreophila D.I.Morris
- Ehrharta stipoides Labill. - Microlaena stipoides
- Ehrharta tasmanica (Hook.f.) L.P.M.Willemse - Microlaena tasmanica (Hook.f.) Hook.f. ex Benth.
- Ehrharta tenella - Sporobolus tenellus
- Ehrharta thomsonii - Zotovia thomsonii
- Ehrharta uniglumis Fenzl ex T.Durand & Schinz 1894 not F.Muell. 1855 - Melinis repens subsp. grandiflora
