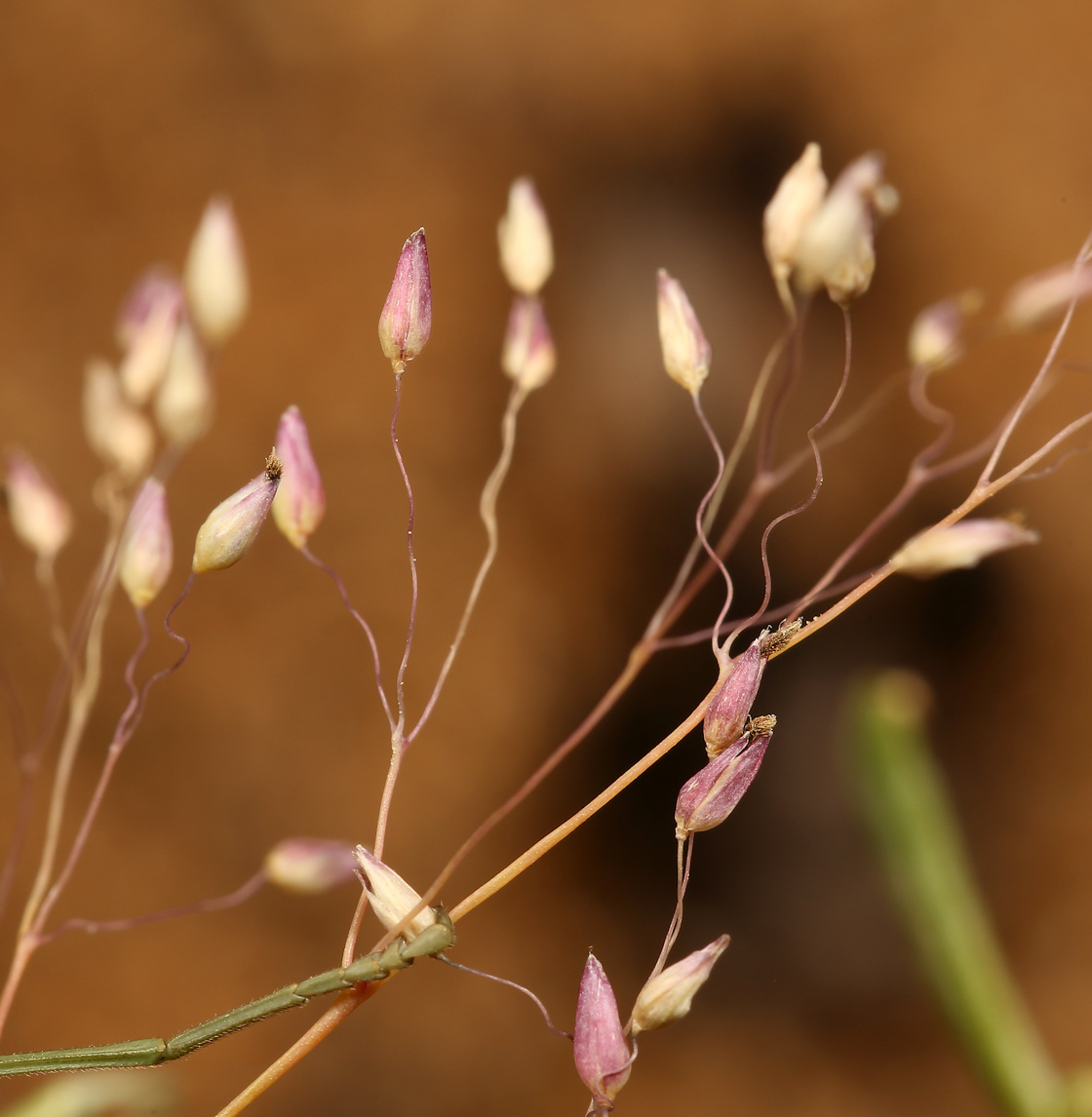
- Tricholaena monachne in South Africa

Scientific classification
- Kingdom: Plantae
- Clade: Tracheophytes
- Clade: Angiosperms
- Clade: Monocots
- Clade: Commelinids
- Order: Poales
- Family: Poaceae
- Subfamily: Panicoideae
- Supertribe: Panicodae
- Tribe: Paniceae
- Subtribe: Melinidinae
- Genus: Tricholaena; Schrad.

Synonyms
- Melinis sect. Tricholaena (Schrad.) Hack.; Panicum sect. Tricholaena (Schrad.) Steud.; Eremochlamys Peter; Xyochlaena Stapf

= Tricholaena =

Genus of grasses

Tricholaena is a genus of Asian, African, and Italian plants in the grass family.

Species

- Tricholaena capensis (Licht. ex Roem. & Schult.) Nees - Free State, Namibia, Cape Province
- Tricholaena monachne (Trin.) Stapf & C.E.Hubb. - drier parts of Africa from Kenya to Cape Province; also Ghana, Togo, Madagascar, Réunion, Pakistan
- Tricholaena teneriffae (L.f.) Link - drier parts of Africa from Morocco to Egypt to Tanzania; Canary Islands; Cape Verde, Arabian Peninsula, Middle East, India, Pakistan, Calabria, Sicily
- Tricholaena vestita (Balf.f.) Stapf & C.E.Hubb. - Socotra

formerly included

see Brachiaria Digitaria Eriachne Melinis Miscanthus Paspalum Saccharum

- Tricholaena abbreviata - Brachiaria serrata
- Tricholaena amethystea - Melinis amethystea
- Tricholaena atropurpurea - Melinis repens
- Tricholaena bellespicata - Melinis longiseta subsp. bellespicata
- Tricholaena brevipila - Melinis repens subsp. grandiflora
- Tricholaena busseana - Melinis nerviglumis
- Tricholaena chevalieri - Melinis nerviglumis
- Tricholaena chinensis - Eriachne pallescens
- Tricholaena congoensis - Melinis nerviglumis
- Tricholaena dregeana - Melinis repens
- Tricholaena filifolia - Melinis nerviglumis
- Tricholaena fragilis - Melinis repens
- Tricholaena fusca - Miscanthus fuscus
- Tricholaena grandiflora - Melinis repens subsp. grandiflora
- Tricholaena grandiflora var. collina - Melinis repens subsp. repens
- Tricholaena grandiflora var. glabrescens - Melinis repens subsp. grandiflora
- Tricholaena insularis - Digitaria insularis
- Tricholaena longiseta - Melinis longiseta
- Tricholaena maroccana - Melinis repens subsp. maroccana
- Tricholaena melinioides - Melinis longiseta
- Tricholaena microstachya - Melinis repens subsp. grandiflora
- Tricholaena microstachya var. albicoma - Melinis repens subsp. grandiflora
- Tricholaena minutiflora - Melinis longiseta
- Tricholaena monachyron - Melinis repens subsp. grandiflora
- Tricholaena nerviglumis - Melinis nerviglumis
- Tricholaena obtecta - Paspalum humboldtianum
- Tricholaena repens - Melinis repens
- Tricholaena rhodesiana - Melinis nerviglumis
- Tricholaena rosea - Melinis repens
- Tricholaena ruficoma - Melinis repens
- Tricholaena rupicola - Melinis rupicola
- Tricholaena saccharoides - Digitaria insularis
- Tricholaena scabrida - Melinis scabrida
- Tricholaena semidecumbens - Saccharum spontaneum
- Tricholaena setifolia - Melinis nerviglumis
- Tricholaena sphacelata - Melinis repens
- Tricholaena tanatricha - Melinis tanatricha
- Tricholaena tonsa - Melinis repens
- Tricholaena tuberculosa - Melinis repens subsp. grandiflora
- Tricholaena uniglumis - Melinis repens subsp. grandiflora
- Tricholaena villosa - Melinis repens subsp. grandiflora
- Tricholaena violacea - Melinis repens
- Tricholaena wightii - Melinis repens subsp. grandiflora
