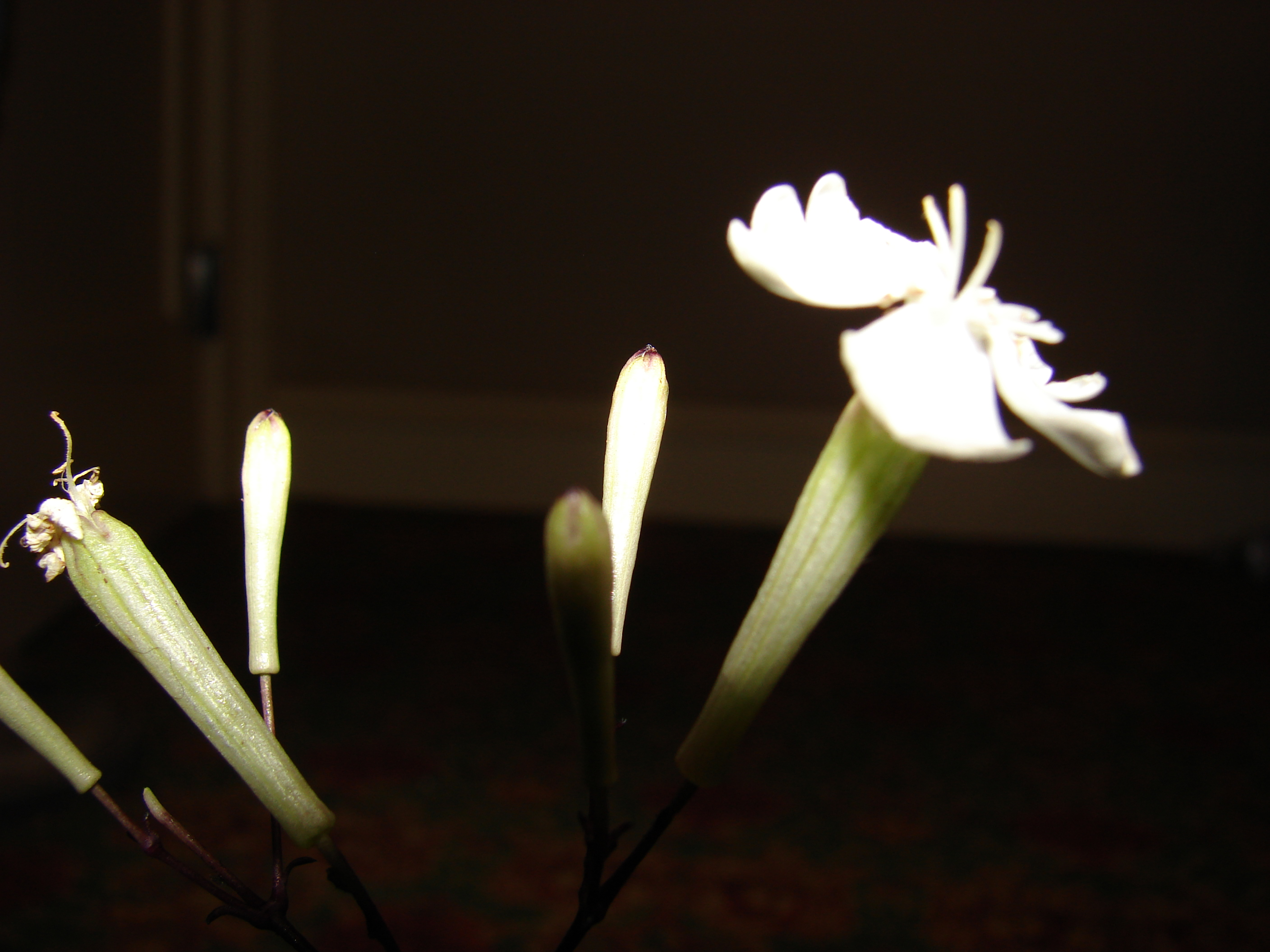

Conservation status
- Critically Imperiled (NatureServe)

Scientific classification
- Kingdom: Plantae
- Clade: Tracheophytes
- Clade: Angiosperms
- Clade: Eudicots
- Order: Caryophyllales
- Family: Caryophyllaceae
- Genus: Silene
- Species: S. alexandri

Binomial name
- Silene alexandri Hillebr.

= Silene alexandri =

Species of flowering plant

Silene alexandri is a rare species of flowering plant in the family Caryophyllaceae known by the common names Kamalo Gulch catchfly and Alexander's catchfly. It is endemic to Hawaii, where it is known only from the island of Molokai. It is threatened by the degradation of its habitat and it is a federally listed endangered species of the United States.

This subshrub grows 30 to 60 centimetres (12 to 24 inches) tall and bears white flowers. It grows in moist lowland shrubland on the sides of steep basalt cliffs. The plant has only been seen on a stretch of the island of Molokai 4 kilometres (2.5 miles) in length. Only one small population of six plants is thought to remain.

This plant is threatened by invasive species of introduced plants in its habitat, including Lantana camara, Melinis minutiflora (molasses grass), and Rhynchelytrum repens (Natal grass). The habitat is degraded by feral goats. Also, the species faces the loss of reproductive vigor because so few individuals remain in the breeding pool.
