= Perennial veldtgrass =

Perennial veldtgrass is a common name for several species of grass in the genus Ehrharta which have become invasive in English speaking countries:

- Ehrharta calycina, the invasive perennial veldtgrass of North America
- Ehrharta erecta, the invasive perennial veldtgrass of Australia
