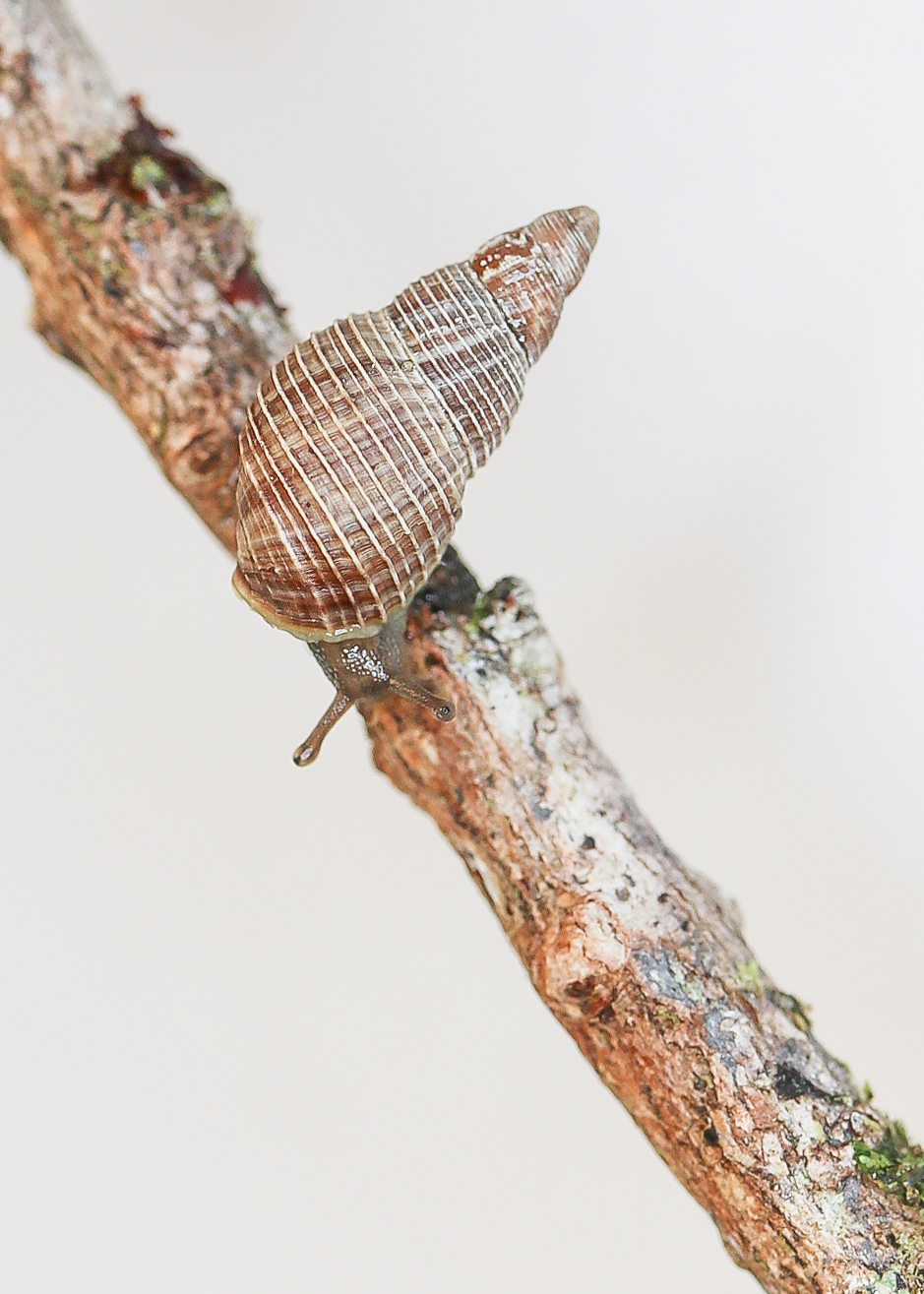

Conservation status
- Endangered (IUCN 2.3)

Scientific classification
- Kingdom: Animalia
- Phylum: Mollusca
- Class: Gastropoda
- Order: Stylommatophora
- Family: Achatinellidae
- Genus: Newcombia
- Species: N. canaliculata

Binomial name
- Newcombia canaliculata Baldwin, 1905

= Newcombia canaliculata =

Species of gastropod

Newcombia canaliculata is a species of air-breathing land snail, a terrestrial pulmonate gastropod mollusk in the family Achatinellidae. This species is endemic to Hawaii.

== Taxonomy ==
The Newcombia genus is divided into three series:

1. Newcombia plicata
2. Newcombia philippiana
3. Newcombia cumingi

== Distribution & Habitat ==
These mollusks have been found in the Hawaiian Archipelago, on Halawa, Molokai and Wailau, Maui. Though rarely seen, they can be found resting at higher, mesic elevations. Commonly they camouflage as pieces of a tree branch. They live on lehua trees, as well as lantana trees.

== Description ==
Newcombia canaliculata has a long, sinistral, thin textured spiral shell, made up of calcium carbonate that ranges in varieties of brown tones. Shells may be solid colors completely, or have multiple tinges/patterns of neutral colors like white, black and brown. What makes the Newcombia canaliculata so unique is its thin spiral ribbing coiled around the shell. Additionally some snails may have zigzag patterns on a single whorl and oftentimes appear "blurred."

== Conservation ==
Newcombia canaliculata on the IUCN Red list as critically endangered. They were recently thought to be extinct until a recent discovery on the island of Molokai.

== Threats ==
These mollusk are at risk to predation by rats (Rattus rattus, Rattus exulans, and Rattus nowegicus) and Chameleons (Chamaeleo jacksonii). Predation as well as low reproductive rates and inbreeding are all threats to Newcombia canaliculata.
