= Dactylispa chapuisii =

Scientific classification
- Kingdom: Animalia
- Phylum: Arthropoda
- Class: Insecta
- Order: Coleoptera
- Suborder: Polyphaga
- Infraorder: Cucujiformia
- Family: Chrysomelidae
- Genus: Dactylispa
- Species: D. chapuisii

Binomial name
- Dactylispa chapuisii (Gestro, 1884)

Synonyms
- Hispa gestroi Chapuis, 1879 (preocc.); Hispa chapuisii Gestro, 1884; Hispa weisei Kraatz, 1895; Hispa pauli Weise, 1897; Dactylispa plena Weise, 1899

Species of beetle

Dactylispa chapuisii is a species of beetle of the family Chrysomelidae. It is found in Angola, Cameroon, Congo, Eritrea, Ethiopia, Kenya, Nigeria, Rwanda, South Africa, Tanzania and Togo.

== Life history ==
The recorded host plants for this species are Melinis minutiflora and Panicum species.
