= Dactylispa ignorata =

Scientific classification
- Kingdom: Animalia
- Phylum: Arthropoda
- Class: Insecta
- Order: Coleoptera
- Suborder: Polyphaga
- Infraorder: Cucujiformia
- Family: Chrysomelidae
- Genus: Dactylispa
- Species: D. ignorata

Binomial name
- Dactylispa ignorata Uhmann, 1953

Species of beetle

Dactylispa ignorata is a species of beetle of the family Chrysomelidae. It is found in Congo, Ethiopia and Zambia.

== Life history ==
The recorded host plant for this species is Melinis minutiflora.
