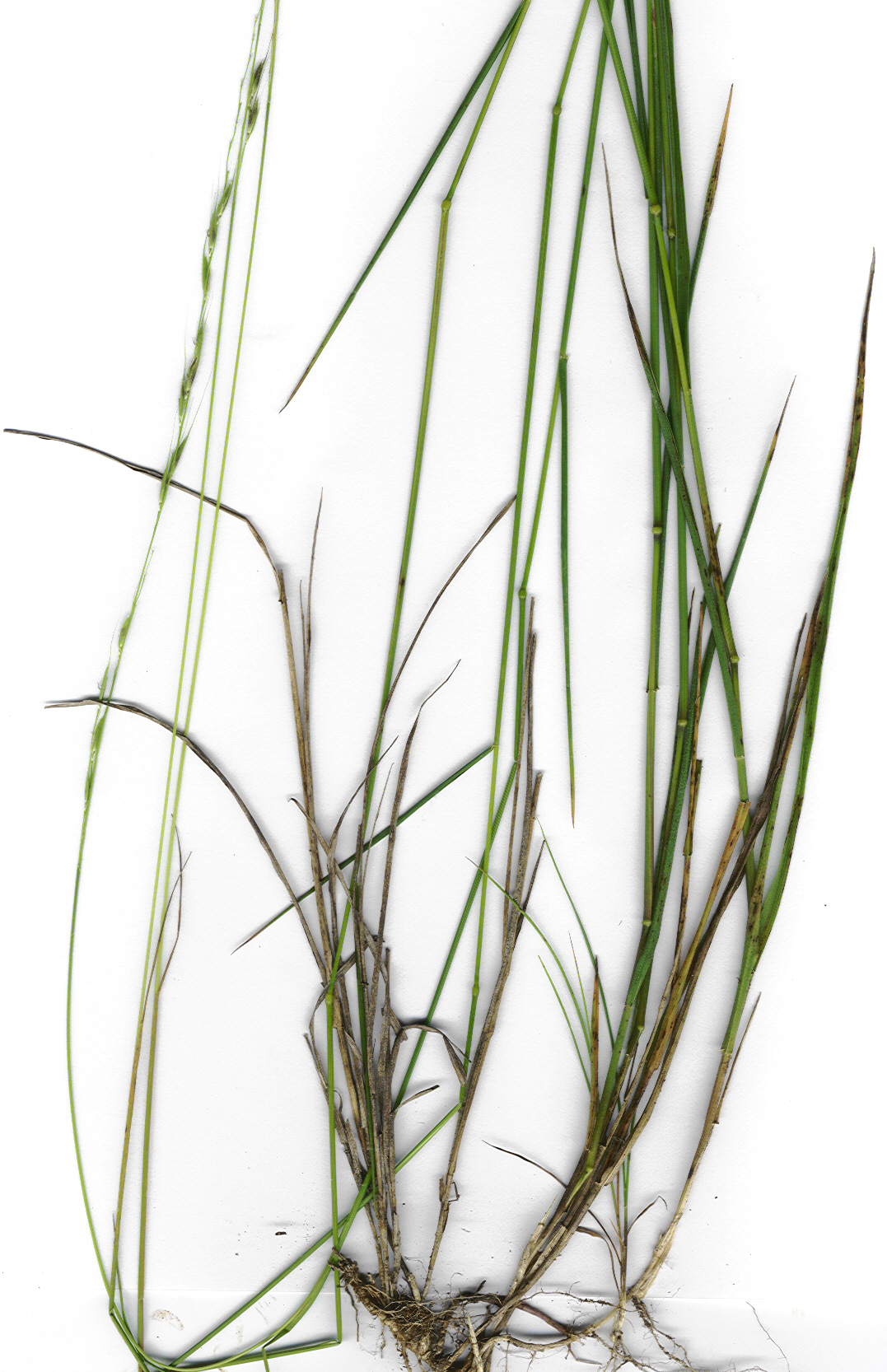

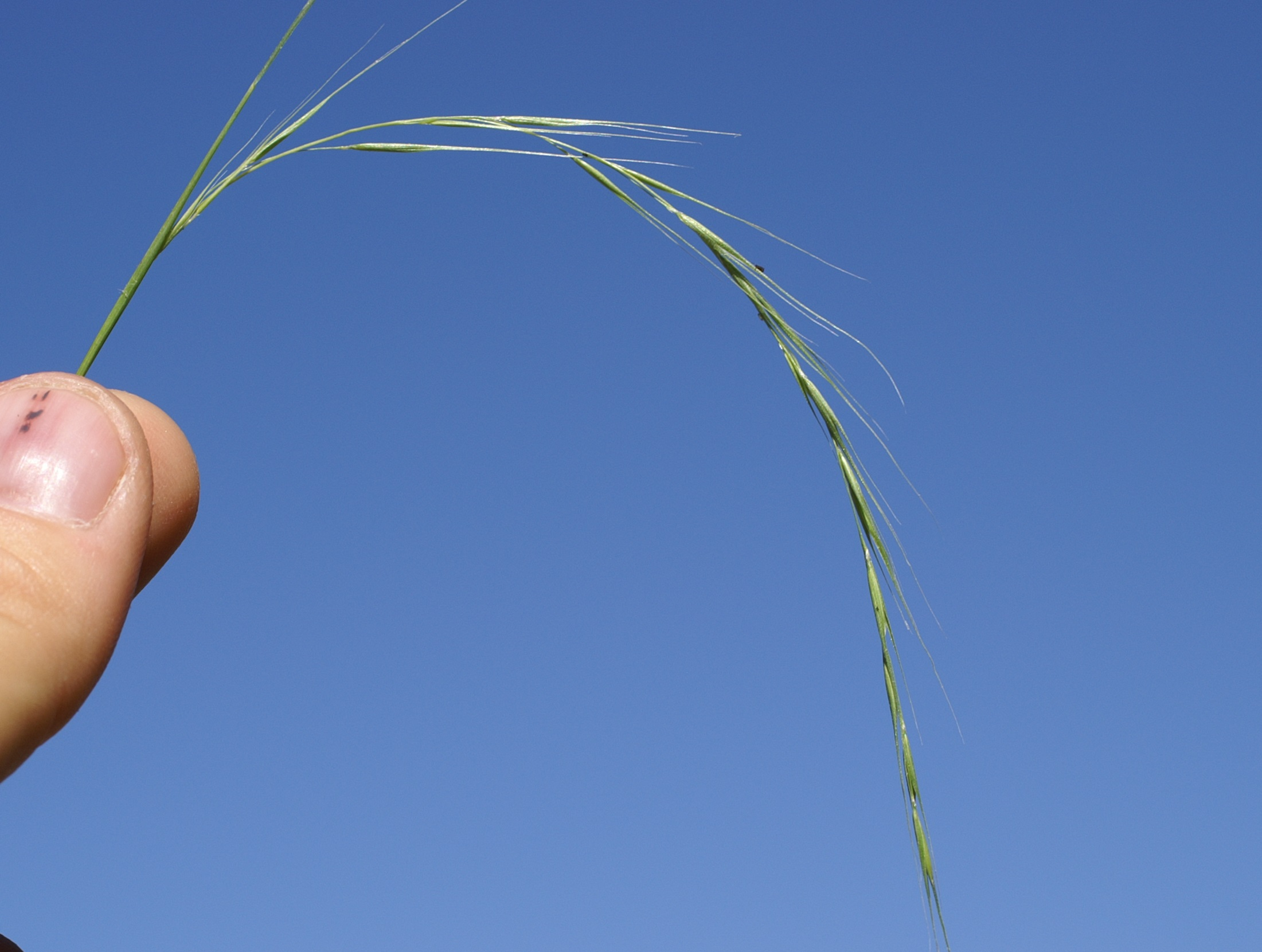

Scientific classification
- Kingdom: Plantae
- Clade: Tracheophytes
- Clade: Angiosperms
- Clade: Monocots
- Clade: Commelinids
- Order: Poales
- Family: Poaceae
- Subfamily: Oryzoideae
- Tribe: Ehrharteae
- Genus: Microlaena; R.Br.
- Species: M. stipoides

Binomial name
- Microlaena stipoides (Labill.) R.Br.

Synonyms
- Ehrharta stipoides Labill.; Microlaena gunnii Hook.f.

= Microlaena stipoides =

Species of plant

Microlaena stipoides, synonym Ehrharta stipoides, is a species of grass. It occurs naturally in all states of Australia as well as in New Zealand, Papua New Guinea, Indonesia and the Philippines. It has also been introduced into Hawaii and Reunion Island and has been reported as invasive in both. Common names used include weeping grass, weeping rice grass and weeping meadow grass.

P. Martin, writing in 2004, commented: "Although the generic name Microlaena is strongly defended by Australasian agrostologists (e.g. Wheeler et al. 2002) many European authors treat it as a section of the genus Ehrharta, so that information on the species in question will be found in these sources under the name Ehrharta stipoides Labill. (e.g. Clayton and Renvoize, 1986)." He refers to the species as Microlaena stipoides.

The Australian Plant Name Index and Australian Plant Census list this scientific name Microlaena stipoides (Labill.) R.Br. as currently accepted and under it is subsumed the synonym of Ehrharta stipoides Labill..

== Description ==
Microlaena stipoides grows to a height of approximately 0.7 metres and produces delicate, drooping stalks of spikelets. The naked caryopses (grains) are similar in shape to rice grains but smaller, approximately 5 mm long, with a mass that varies widely, ranging from 1 mg to 7 mg. The grass grows best in acidic soils and is drought- and frost-tolerant. In Australia it is found in areas of medium to high rainfall (above 600 mm per annum) and the leaves normally remain green all year.

The 1889 book 'The Useful Native Plants of Australia’ records that common names included "Weeping Grass" and "Meadow Rice Grass." It also states that it is "A perennial grass, which keeps beautifully green all through the year. For this reason its growth for pasturage should be encouraged, particularly as it will live on poor soil, provided it be damp. It is considered nearly as valuable as Kangaroo grass, and in the cool season more so. Mr. Bacchus finds it to bear overstocking better than any other native grass, and to maintain a close turf. It is valued in New Zealand. High testimony of the value of this grass is also given by Ranken, after experiments extending over many years. It, however, does not always freely seed."

== Uses ==
Microlaena stipoides produces nutritious pasture for grazing livestock with productivity of approximately 2 to 7 tonnes per hectare and digestibility of approximately 60–70%. Its drought-tolerance has led to an increasing interest in its use for turf to replace exotic species, and it is being researched as a perennial grain crop. The grains are high in protein and small-scale commercial production for human consumption has commenced.
