= Brylkinieae =

Scientific classification
- Kingdom: Plantae
- Clade: Tracheophytes
- Clade: Angiosperms
- Clade: Monocots
- Clade: Commelinids
- Order: Poales
- Family: Poaceae
- Subfamily: Pooideae
- Tribe: Brylkinieae; Tateoka (1960)

Genera
- Brylkinia

Synonyms
- Brylkiniinae Ohwi (1941)

Tribe of grasses

Brylkinieae is a tribe of grasses, containing a single genus, Brylkinia. It used to be placed in tribe Meliceae, and had previously included a second genus, Koordersiochloa.
