= Newcombia sulcata =

Conservation status
- Endangered (IUCN 2.3)

Scientific classification
- Kingdom: Animalia
- Phylum: Mollusca
- Class: Gastropoda
- Order: Stylommatophora
- Family: Achatinellidae
- Genus: Newcombia
- Species: N. sulcata

Binomial name
- Newcombia sulcata Pfeiffer, 1857

Species of gastropod

Newcombia sulcata is a species of tropical tree-living air-breathing land snail, arboreal pulmonate gastropod mollusk in the family Achatinellidae. This species is endemic to the United States.
