= Melinis reynaudioides =

Scientific classification
- Kingdom: Plantae
- Clade: Tracheophytes
- Clade: Angiosperms
- Clade: Monocots
- Clade: Commelinids
- Order: Poales
- Family: Poaceae
- Subfamily: Panicoideae
- Genus: Melinis
- Species: M. reynaudioides

Binomial name
- Melinis reynaudioides (C.E.Hubb.) Zizka (1988)

Synonyms
- Mildbraediochloa reynaudioides (C.E. Hubb. ex Mildbr.) Butzin (1971); Rhynchelythrum reynaudioides C.E.Hubb. (1937)

Species of grass

Melinis reynaudioides is a species of grass endemic to Annobón Island in Equatorial Guinea.
