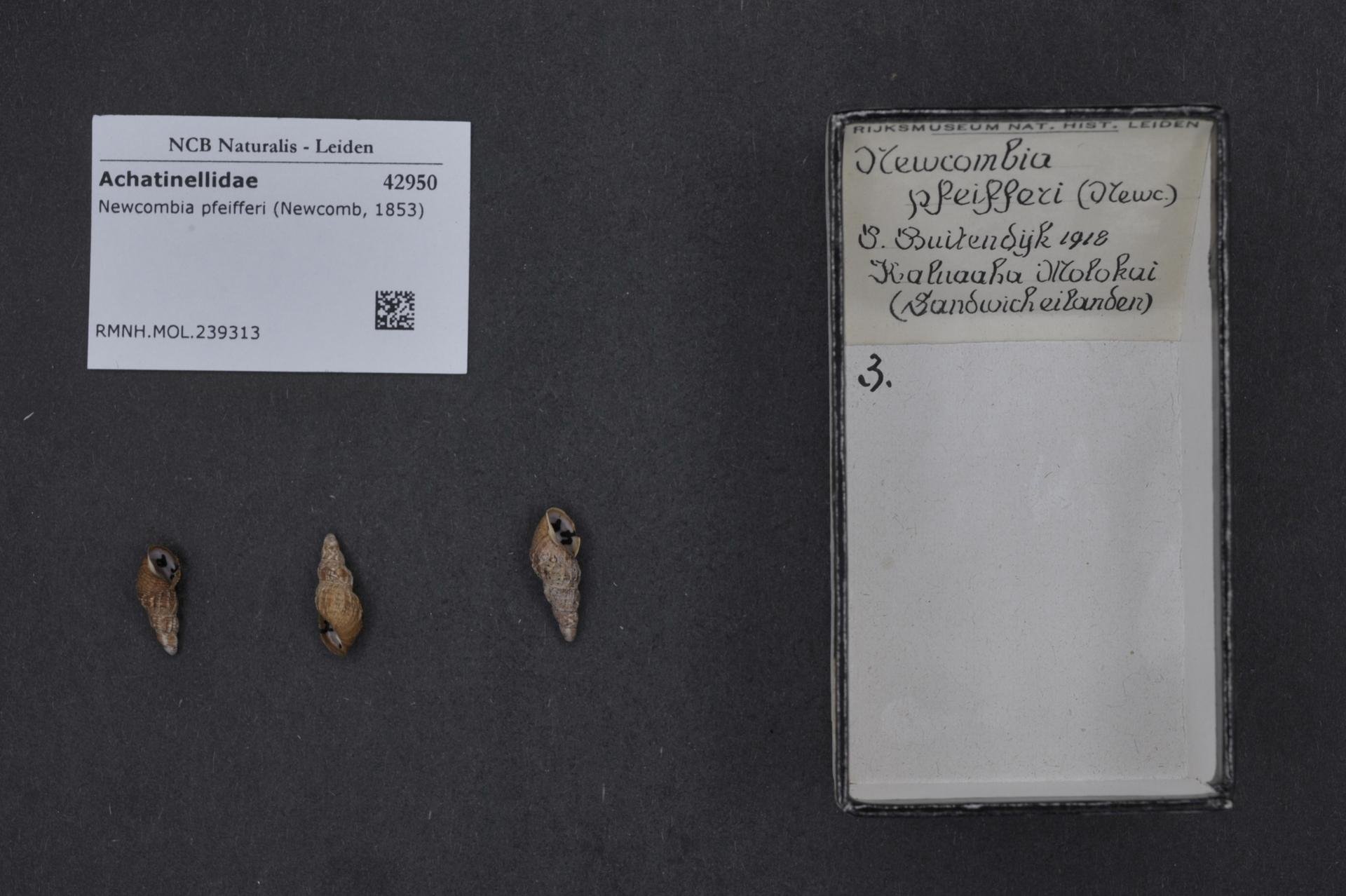

Conservation status
- Endangered (IUCN 2.3)

Scientific classification
- Kingdom: Animalia
- Phylum: Mollusca
- Class: Gastropoda
- Order: Stylommatophora
- Family: Achatinellidae
- Genus: Newcombia
- Species: N. pfeifferi

Binomial name
- Newcombia pfeifferi Newcomb, 1853

= Newcombia pfeifferi =

Species of gastropod

Newcombia pfeifferi is a species of air-breathing land snail, a terrestrial pulmonate gastropod mollusk in the family Achatinellidae. This species is endemic to Hawaii.
