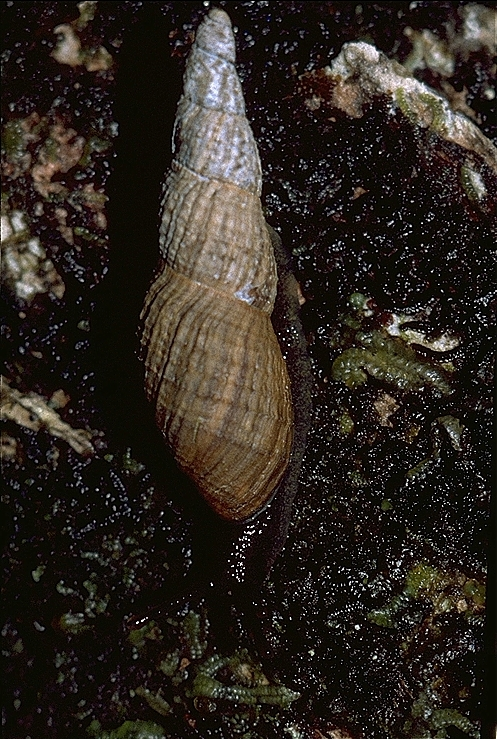
- Newcombia cumingi

Scientific classification
- Kingdom: Animalia
- Phylum: Mollusca
- Class: Gastropoda
- Order: Stylommatophora
- Family: Achatinellidae
- Genus: Newcombia; Pfeiffer, 1854

Diversity
- 7 species

= Newcombia =

Genus of gastropods

Newcombia is a genus of tropical tree-living air-breathing land snails, arboreal pulmonate gastropod mollusks in the family Achatinellidae.

The Hawaiian tree snail genus Newcombia is a member of the family Achatinellidae and the endemic Hawaiian subfamily Achatinellinae. The genus is endemic to the islands of Maui and Molokai, Hawaii. Six of the known species were endemic to Molokai (Newcombia canaliculata, Newcombia lirata, Newcombia perkinsi, Newcombia pfeifferi, Newcombia philippiana, and Newcombia sulcata), and only one species, Newcombia cumingi, is known from the island of Maui. Henry Augustus Pilsbry and Charles Montague Cooke, Jr. (1912-1914) is the most recent and accepted taxonomy for this genus.

== Species ==
Species within the genus Newcombia include:

- Newcombia canaliculata Baldwin, 1905
- Newcombia cumingi Sykes, 1896
- Newcombia lirata Mighels, 1912 (†)
- Newcombia perkinsi Sykes, 1896 (†)
- Newcombia pfeifferi Newcomb, 1853
- Newcombia philippiana Pfeiffer, 1850 (†)
- Newcombia sulcata Pfeiffer, 1857 (†)
