= Newcombia lirata =

Conservation status
- Endangered (IUCN 2.3)

Scientific classification
- Kingdom: Animalia
- Phylum: Mollusca
- Class: Gastropoda
- Order: Stylommatophora
- Family: Achatinellidae
- Genus: Newcombia
- Species: N. lirata

Binomial name
- Newcombia lirata Mighels, 1912

Species of gastropod

Newcombia lirata is a species of air-breathing land snail, a terrestrial pulmonate gastropod mollusk in the family Achatinellidae. This species is endemic to Hawaii.

== Description ==
Their spiral shells vary in appearance based on genetics and habitat. Unfortunately, this snail is now endangered. It faces severe threats from habitat destruction, invasive predators like rats, and environmental pollution. Because it exists nowhere else on Earth, protecting its remaining Hawaiian habitat is critical to its survival.
