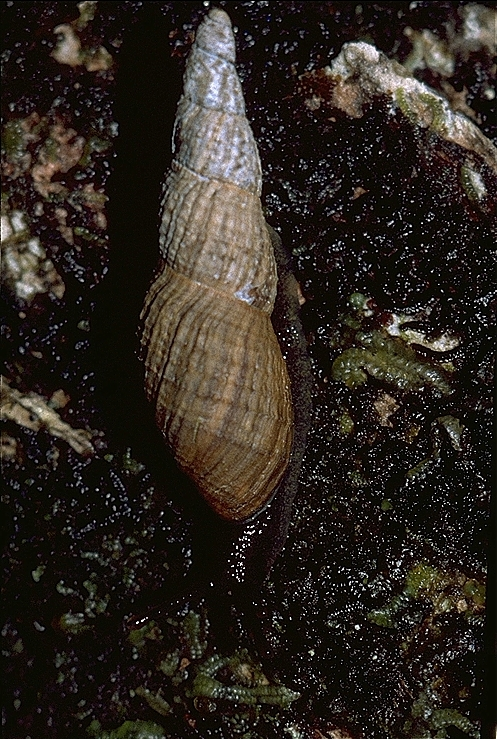

Conservation status
- Endangered (IUCN 2.3)

- Critically Imperiled (NatureServe)

Scientific classification
- Kingdom: Animalia
- Phylum: Mollusca
- Class: Gastropoda
- Order: Stylommatophora
- Family: Achatinellidae
- Genus: Newcombia
- Species: N. cumingi

Binomial name
- Newcombia cumingi (Newcomb, 1853)

Synonyms
- Achatinella cumingi Newcomb, 1853

= Newcombia cumingi =

Species of gastropod

Newcombia cumingi, common name Newcomb's tree snail, is a species of air-breathing land snail, a terrestrial pulmonate gastropod mollusk in the family Achatinellidae. This species is endemic to Hawaii, the United States.

== Distribution ==
Newcombia cumingi is the only known species of the genus Newcombia from the island of Maui, Hawaii, while six other species of Newcombia live on Molokai. The current location occupied by this snail is on private property, managed by the Maui Land & Pineapple Company and as part of the Puʻu Kukui Watershed Preserve.

Historically, it was distributed from the West Maui Mountains to the slopes of Haleakalā volcano. Snails were reported from relatively low elevation locations (probably around 1,000 feet (300 m) and up to over 3,280 feet (1,000 m) above sea level. Until October 1994, the last documented sightings of this snail species were in the early 1900s near Lahaina, Wailuku, and Makawao.

In 1994, private natural resource personnel located a small population of Newcomb's tree snails while monitoring transects for alien species in the mountains of west Maui in the Puu Kukui Reserve. This is the only currently known population. It is located on a single ridge on the northeastern slope of West Maui. The area inhabited by Newcomb's tree snail extends from 2,412 feet (735 m) to 2,641 feet (805 m) in elevation and does not exceed 6.18 acres (2.51 hectares).

== Description ==
Newcombia cumingi has a sinistral (left-coiling) shell. The shape of the shell is oblong and spindle-shaped. It has five to seven whorls that are coarsely sculptured. It reaches an adult length of approximately 0.8 inches (20 mm) and its shell is mottled on shades of brown that blend with the bark of its host plants.

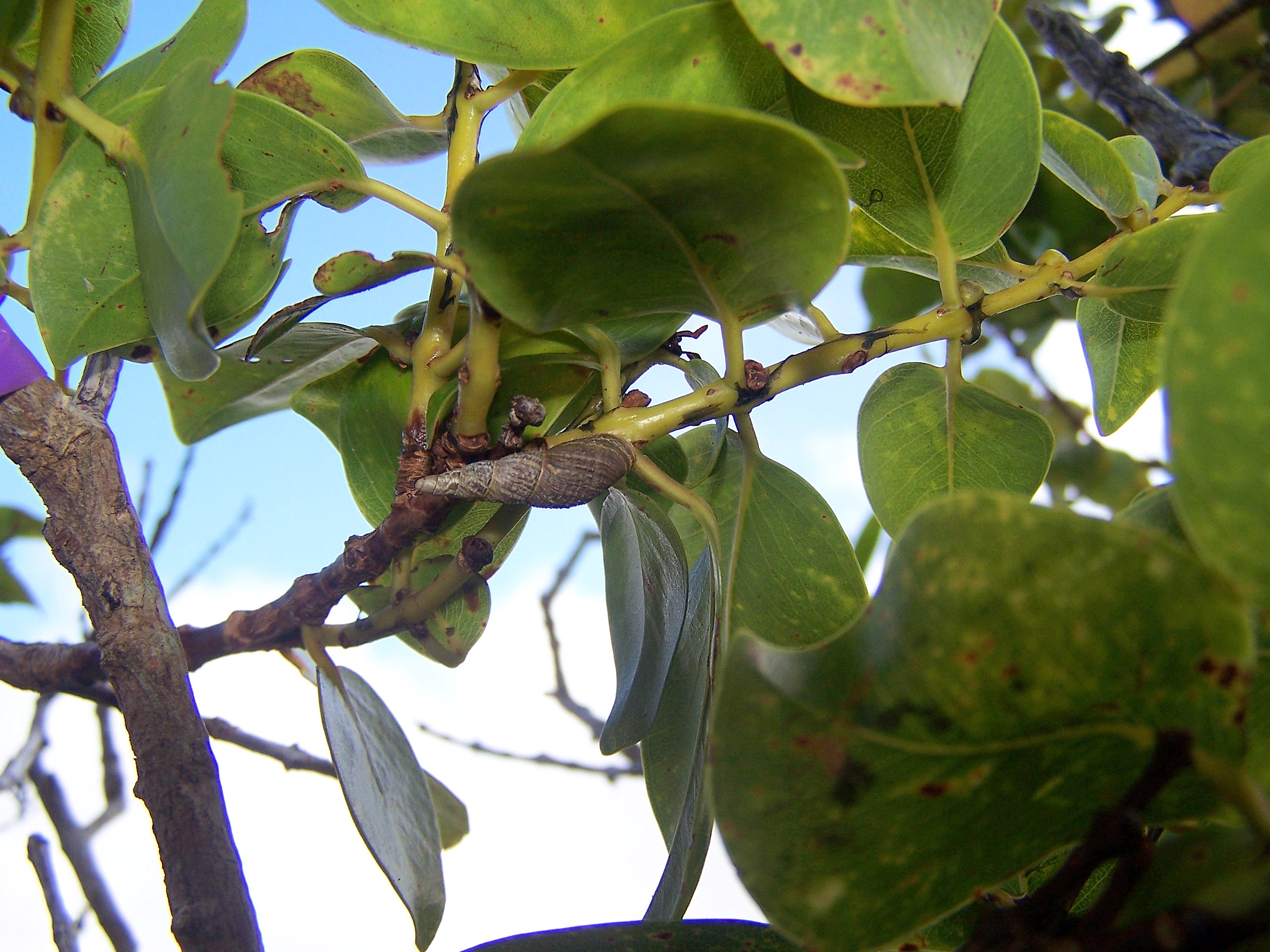
Newcombia cumingi on Metrosideros polymorpha.

== Ecology ==
Similar to other achatinellid tree snails of Hawaii, the Newcomb's tree snail feeds on fungi and algae which grow on the leaves and trunks of living native Hawaiian trees. The Newcomb's tree snail is believed to exhibit the slow growth and low reproductive rate of other Hawaiian tree snails belonging to this family. Newcomb's tree snail has been reported living on small trees of the native plant Metrosideros polymorpha (ohia lehua). Snails are most common in areas with a high percent cover of both Dicranopteris linearis (uluhe) and ohia lehua and are not present in areas where ohia cover is diminished and uluhe is replaced by grasses.

Adults require several years to reach sexual maturity; reproductive rates are low; the young emerge live from the parent; and dispersal is very limited, with most individuals remaining in the tree or bush on which they were born. All of these traits make these snails very sensitive to any event that could lead to a reduction or loss of reproductive individuals.

=== Population density ===
In 1996, a mark-recapture study was initiated where Newcomb's tree snail occurred. Three trees with the greatest number of snails found were identified for the study. A total of 86 snails were documented. The site continued to be visited and snails counted in the four trees between 1999 and 2002, indicating that the population was more or less stable. In August 2006, Dr. Michael G. Hadfield and his crew attempted to relocate specimens of Newcomb's tree snail in the marked trees that had been studied from 1996 through 2002. Two of the four study trees had died and numerous shells of the rosy carnivore snail Euglandina rosea were found beneath trees formerly inhabited by Newcomb's tree snail. No Newcomb's tree snails were found on this survey. In October 2006, the U.S. Fish and Wildlife Service funded additional surveys by Dr. Hadfield and an expanded crew to search the original 6.18 acres (2.51 hectares) site. A total of nine living Newcomb's tree snails were found.

== Threats ==
The single known population of Newcomb's tree snail occurs on private land that is currently zoned and managed as conservation land. However, the habitat on the ridge where 8 of the 9 living Newcomb's snail were found is badly degraded by the invasion of nonnative invasive plants. Many of the small ohia lehua trees that are the main host tree for this tree snail have died as well as two trees that had marked Newcomb's tree snails in them. The native uluhe fern is being replaced by Rubus sp. (blackberry), Melinis minutiflora (molasses grass), Tibouchina sp., and invasive grasses.

The collections for scientific as well as recreational purposes in the 18th to early 20th centuries of Newcomb's tree snails do not seem to be nearly as extensive, probably due to the fact that the shell of these snails lacks the luster and diversity of color and pattern that characterize Achatinella and Partulina.

Diseases are not known to have contributed to declines in the Hawaiian tree snail fauna. Predation, however, has had severe impacts on the tree snail fauna of Hawaii and other Pacific islands. The black rat Rattus rattus appears to be a major threat to the Newcomb's tree snail on Maui. During the first year of the mark-recapture study initiated in 1996 for Newcomb's tree snails, evidence of rat predation on other tree snail species within the study area was documented. No direct evidence of rat predation on Newcomb's tree snails were found, though researchers theorized that no Newcomb's tree snail shells were found because of their fragility, small size, and brown coloration, which would make it much more difficult to find in the leaf litter in comparison to other predated snail shells. Norway rat Rattus norvegicus and Polynesian rat Rattus exulans are the major introduced predators on extant populations of Hawaiian tree snails.

The rosy carnivore snail is a voracious predator on terrestrial and arboreal snails and Hadfield (2007) reported finding several live rosy carnivore snails within the habitat of the remaining Newcomb's tree snails.

Other possible predators of Newcomb's tree snails include an introduced terrestrial flatworm Platydemus manokwari and the introduced terrestrial snail Oxychilus alliarius, which have both been reported to feed on snails. Platydemus manokwari probably lives also on Maui. Hadfield (2007) reported finding many shells of Oxychilus alliarius within the habitat of the remaining Newcomb's tree snails.

== Conservation ==
In 2013 the US Fish and Wildlife Service listed the snail as an endangered species. A five-year review in 2020 noted the discovery of two new populations, but that snails in the wild were expected to continue to decline because of continuing threats of habitat loss, invasive species, fire, drought, and environmental change. Some snails have been observed on land under protection by state watershed partnership programs, and invasive species control on these lands are expected to benefit the snails.

=== Captive breeding ===
In 1995, 5 individuals were collected for captive propagation in the Endangered Snail Lab located at the University of Hawaii, Manoa, campus. In 2000, two more individuals were brought in to augment the population. Although Newcomb's tree snails were reproducing in captivity, newborn mortality was high and the population experienced a rapid decline with the final death occurring on August 30, 2005. In 2019, 20 snails from a newly discovered population were brought to the Snail Extinction Prevention Program, and the program was reported as successful in 2020.
