= Ehrharta diplax =

Scientific classification
- Kingdom: Plantae
- Clade: Tracheophytes
- Clade: Angiosperms
- Clade: Monocots
- Clade: Commelinids
- Order: Poales
- Family: Poaceae
- Genus: Ehrharta
- Species: E. diplax

Binomial name
- Ehrharta diplax F.Muell. (1870)

Species of plant

Ehrharta diplax, commonly known as bush rice grass, is a species of grass in New Zealand. It was described as Diplax avenacea in 1844 by French botanist Étienne Raoul in his book Choix de plantes de la Nouvelle-Zélande.

Until recently, it was known as Microlaena avenacea, a name given to it by Joseph Dalton Hooker in 1870.

== Description ==
Ehrharta diplax is a tussocky grass with wide, glaucous or pale green leaves. The panicles are tall, bearing conspicuously awned 2-flowered spikelets.

== Distribution ==
Ehrharta diplax is indigenous to New Zealand. Plants found in New Guinea, Fiji, and Tahiti may also correspond to the same species. New Guinean (mostly Papua New Guinean) plants have been referred to as a separate variety (var. giulianettii).

In New Zealand, E. diplax is widespread, found throughout the North Island, in the South Island from Nelson south to Fiordland (but largely found west of Southern Alps and less frequent in east). It is also found on the Stewart and Auckland Islands.

The type location was akaroa, a town on the Banks Peninsula.

== Habitat ==
Ehrharta diplax commonly grows in forests throughout New Zealand, but may occasionally be found in the open (usually on forest edges). It is found from sea level to 1200 meters above sea level.

In New Guinea, Fiji, and Tahiti, E. diplax is a high altitude plant, found in damp forest at 2800-3500 meters above sea level.

E. diplax is typically a species of understoreys, but can occasionally grow as an epiphyte on treeferns.

== Ecology ==
=== Breeding ecology ===
E. diplax flowers are apparently exclusively chasmogamous, and are pollinated by wind. Seeds are mainly spread by wind, but the long awns on the florets can stick to hairy surfaces, so may be occasionally dispersed by animals. Whole florets can also wash downslope in rain. E. diplax occasionally reproduces vegetatively via stolons produced through lateral shoots that burst from the side of the plant (extravaginal branching).

=== Herbivory and parasitism ===
Ehrharta diplax is avoided by goats and deer, allowing it to remain common in heavily browsed forests. It is apparently eaten by cattle. On Te Moehau in the Coromandel, an association was described where tawa-kāmahi forest had collapsed due to intense herbivory, to be replaced by a dense grassland of E. diplax.

E. diplax is one host of the generalist mealybug Rhizoecus deboerae.

== Phenology ==
Ehrharta diplax typically flowers in mid-summer, with seeds being produced soon after.

== Taxonomy ==
Ehrharta diplax contains the following varieties:

- Ehrharta diplax var. avenacea
- Ehrharta diplax var. diplax
- Ehrharta diplax var. guilianetti

E. diplax var. guilianetti was initially described as a distinct species, but was reduced to a variety under E. diplax by Luc Willemse in 1982.
