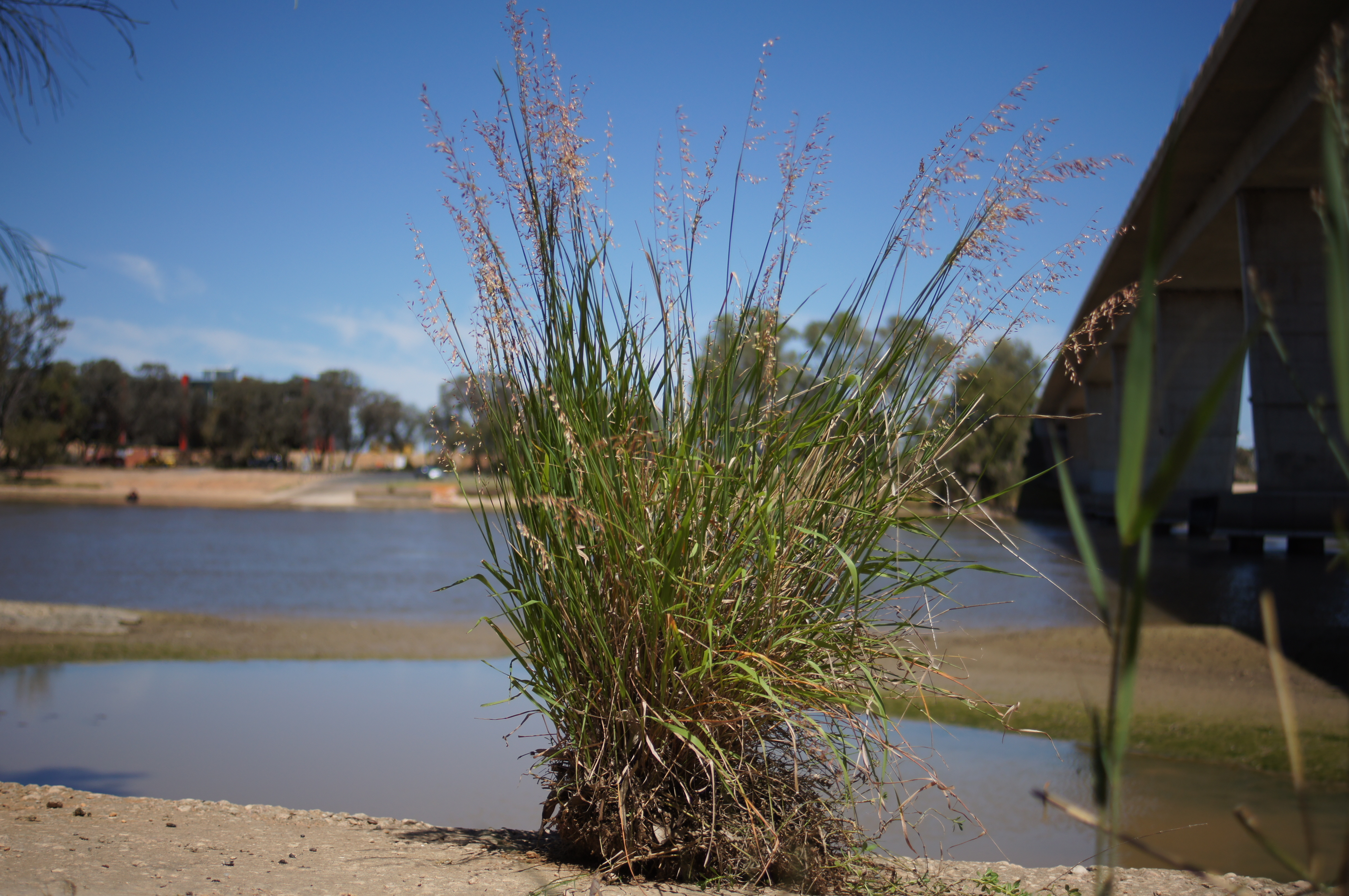
- Ehrharta calycina

Scientific classification
- Kingdom: Plantae
- Clade: Tracheophytes
- Clade: Angiosperms
- Clade: Monocots
- Clade: Commelinids
- Order: Poales
- Family: Poaceae
- Clade: BOP clade
- Subfamily: Oryzoideae
- Tribe: Ehrharteae; Nevski (1937)

Genera
- Ehrharta; Microlaena; Tetrarrhena; Zotovia

= Ehrharteae =

Tribe of plants

Ehrharteae is a tribe in the grass family, comprising four genera.
