= Newcombia perkinsi =

Conservation status
- Endangered (IUCN 2.3)

Scientific classification
- Kingdom: Animalia
- Phylum: Mollusca
- Class: Gastropoda
- Order: Stylommatophora
- Family: Achatinellidae
- Genus: Newcombia
- Species: N. perkinsi

Binomial name
- Newcombia perkinsi Sykes, 1896

Species of gastropod

Newcombia perkinsi is a species of air-breathing land snail, a terrestrial pulmonate gastropodmollusk in the family Achatinellidae. This species is endemic to Hawaii, the United States.

== Habitat ==
Hawaiian tree snails like Newcombia live in moist native forests with shaded, cool conditions and depend on trees with high humidity for survival.
