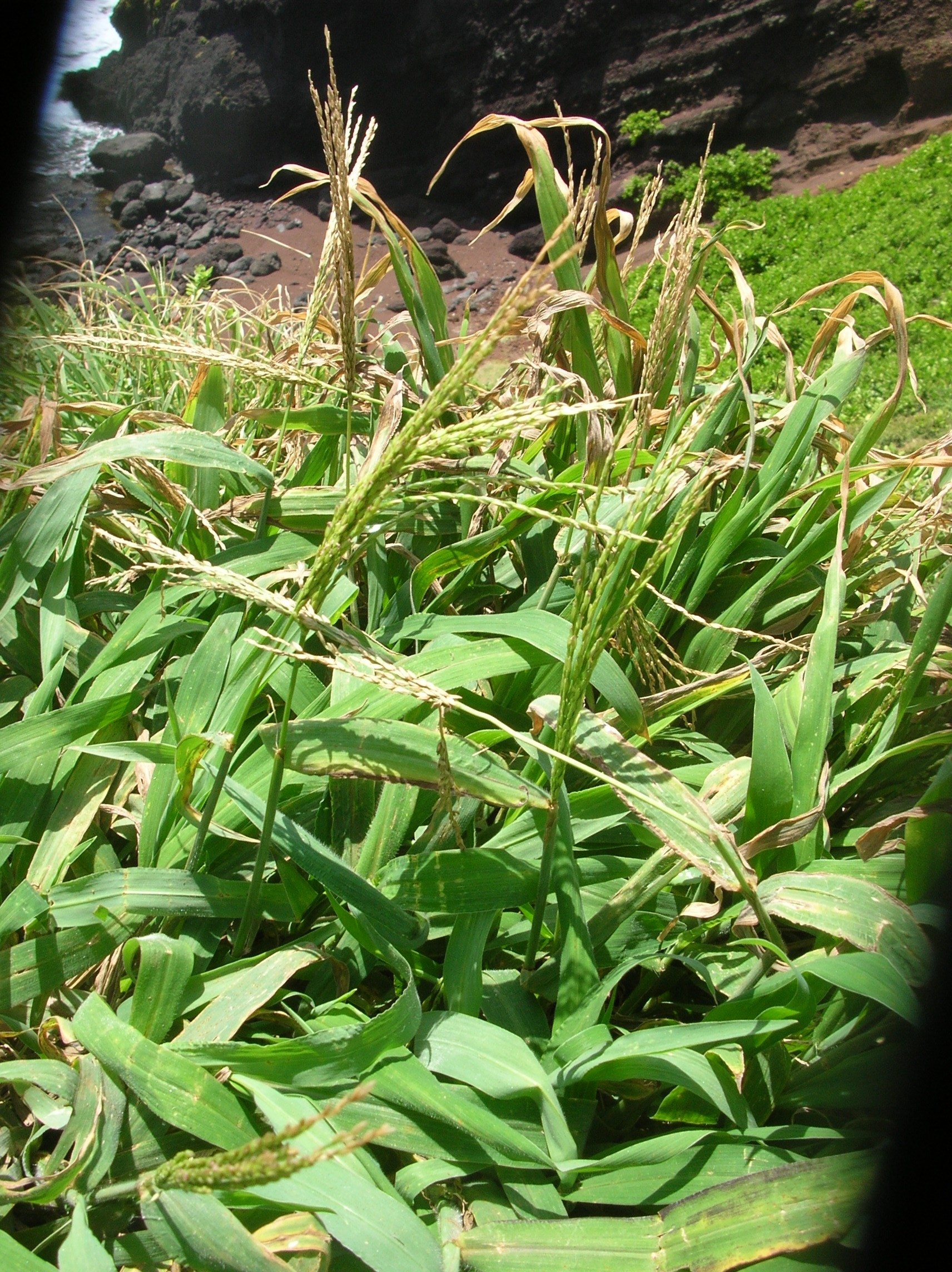

Conservation status
- Least Concern (IUCN 3.1)

Scientific classification
- Kingdom: Plantae
- Clade: Tracheophytes
- Clade: Angiosperms
- Clade: Monocots
- Clade: Commelinids
- Order: Poales
- Family: Poaceae
- Subfamily: Panicoideae
- Genus: Digitaria
- Species: D. insularis

Binomial name
- Digitaria insularis (L.) Fedde

Synonyms
- Andropogon insularis L.; Digitaria insularis (L.) Mez ex Ekman; Panicum insulare (L.) G. Mey.; Syntherisma insulare (L.) Millsp. & Chase; Trichachne insularis (L.) Nees; Tricholaena insularis (L.) Griseb.; Valota insularis (L.) Chase

= Digitaria insularis =

Sourgrass

Species of grass

Digitaria insularis is a species of grass commonly known as sourgrass. It is native to Central and South America and the southern parts of the United States and has been introduced into other parts of the world. It was first described by the German botanist Friedrich Karl Georg Fedde in 1904.

== Description ==
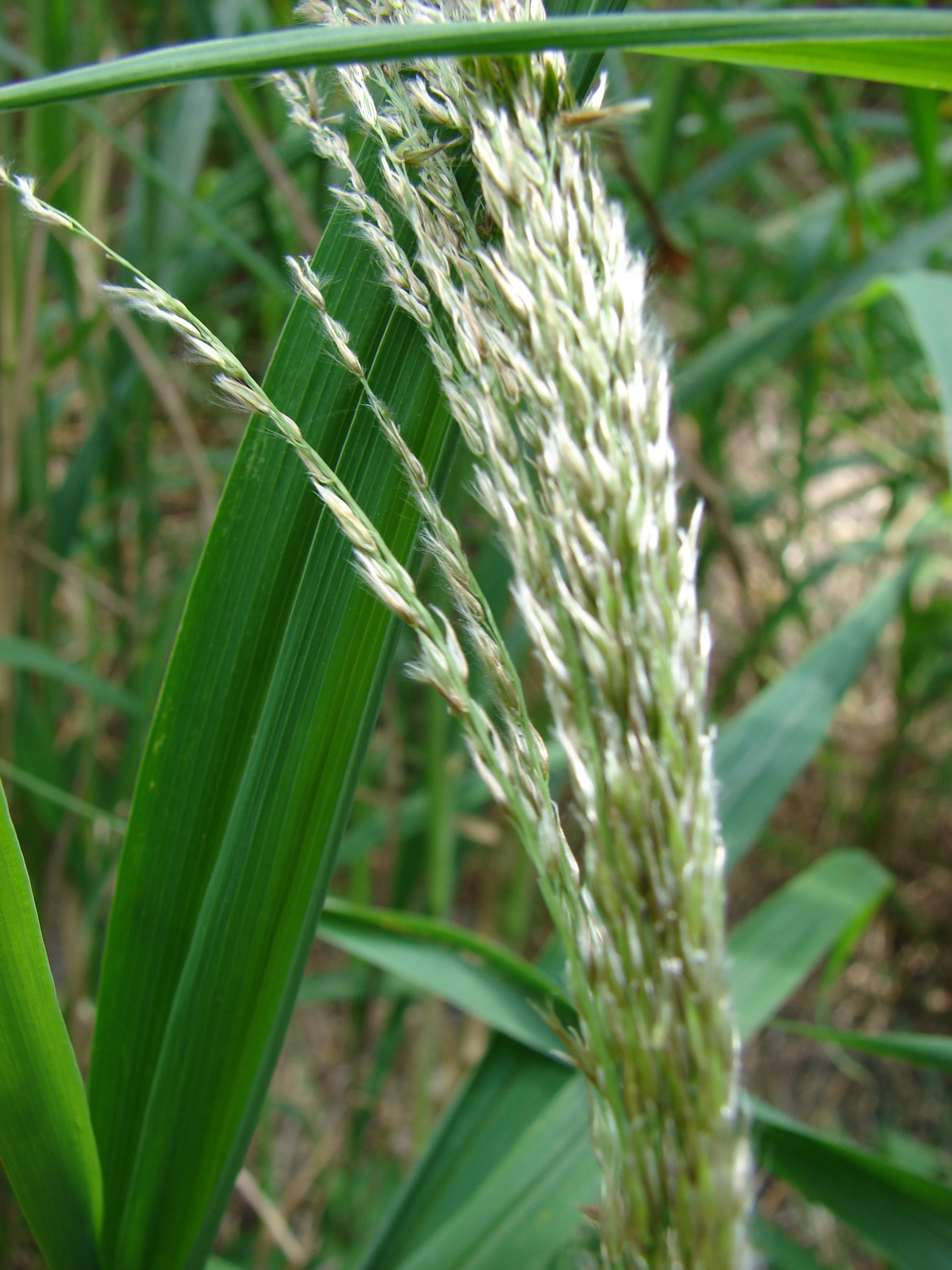
Flower spike

Digitaria insularis is a tufted perennial bunchgrass with very short, swollen rhizomes. The stems reach a height of 80–130 cm and are erect, branched from the lower and middle nodes, swollen bases, with woolly bracts, glabrous internodes and nodes. Sheaths papillose - pilose in their majority, ligule 4–6 mm long, blades linear, 20–50 cm long and 10–20 mm wide. Inflorescence 20–35 cm long, numerous clusters, 10–15 cm long, solitary triquetrous rachis of clusters, 0.4-0.7 mm wide, scabrous; spikelets lanceolate, 4.2-4.6 mm long, paired, caudate, densely covered with trichomes up to 6 mm long, brown or whitish, ranging up to 5 mm from the apex of the spikelet; lower glume triangular to ovate, to 0.6 mm long, enervate, membranous; upper glume 3.5-4.5 mm long, acute, 3-5 nerved, ciliated; inferior lemma as long as spikelet, acuminate, 7-nerved, covered with silky hairs, upper lemma 3.2-3.6 mm long, acuminate, dark brown; anthers 1-1.2 mm long.

== Distribution and habitat ==
Digitaria insularis is native to the tropical and sub-tropical Americas.

It is a common species found in disturbed areas and on beaches, at an altitude of up to 1,400 m (4,593 ft) above sea level.

In its native Brazil, Paraguay, Bolivia and Venezuela it is a pervasive weed out of its natural habitats. It has been introduced in tropical Asia and some Pacific islands and elsewhere. In some countries into which it has been introduced such as Hawaii and Papua New Guinea, it is considered an invasive species.
