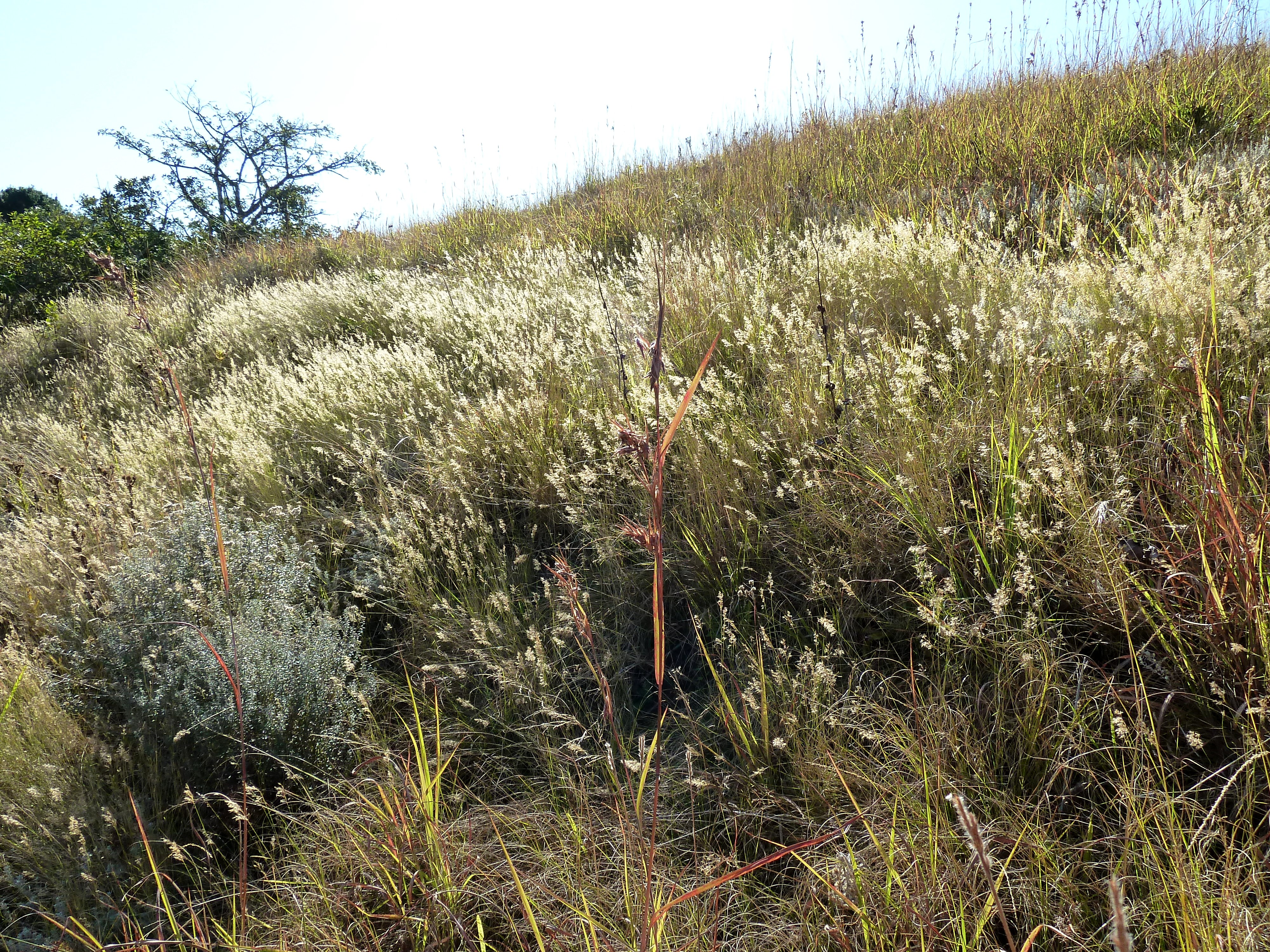
- Habit in South Africa

Scientific classification
- Kingdom: Plantae
- Clade: Tracheophytes
- Clade: Angiosperms
- Clade: Monocots
- Clade: Commelinids
- Order: Poales
- Family: Poaceae
- Subfamily: Panicoideae
- Genus: Melinis
- Species: M. nerviglumis

Binomial name
- Melinis nerviglumis (Franch.) Zizka

Synonyms
- Synonymy: Melinis bachmannii Mez; Melinis muenzneri Mez; Melinis nyassana Mez; Melinis setifolia (Stapf) Hack.; Melinis villosipes Mez; Panicum busseanum Mez; Panicum elongatum Mez, nom. illeg. homonym. post.; Panicum gracillimum Mez, nom. illeg. homonym. post.; Rhynchelythrum filifolium (Franch.) Stapf & C.E.Hubb.; Rhynchelythrum nerviglume (Franch.) Chiov.; Rhynchelythrum nyassanum (Mez) Stapf & C.E.Hubb.; Rhynchelythrum ramosum Stapf & C.E.Hubb.; Rhynchelythrum rhodesianum (Rendle) Stapf & C.E.Hubb.; Rhynchelythrum setifolium (Stapf) Chiov.; Rhynchelythrum stuposum Stapf & C.E.Hubb.; Tricholaena busseana (Mez) Peter; Tricholaena chevalieri A.Camus; Tricholaena congoensis Franch.; Tricholaena filifolia Franch.; Tricholaena nerviglumis Franch.; Tricholaena rhodesiana Rendle; Tricholaena rhodesiana var. glabrescens Rendle; Tricholaena rosea subvar. nsoaensis Vanderyst; Tricholaena rosea var. vanheei Vanderyst, nom. provis.; Tricholaena setifolia Stapf

= Melinis nerviglumis =

Mountain red top

Species of grass

Melinis nerviglumis is a species of grass known by the common names mountain red top or bristle-leaved red top. The Latin name refers to the veined glume. It is native from tropical to southern Africa, the western Indian Ocean islands, and Indochina. It is cultivated as a garden ornamental due to its colourful purple flowers. The flowers are produced in summer and fade to white as they mature. By this time the seeds can be harvested for new plantings.

== Features ==
A dense tufted grass that has unbranched culms. The culms are flexible and have hanging inflorescences. Leaves are blue-green rolled and usually concentrated at the base. It grows in gravely soils in stable velds and flowers throughout the year but mostly in summer.

== Measurements ==
Culms: 300-900mm tall

Inflorescence: 40-150mm long

Spikelets: 3.5-5mm long

Leaf blade: 100-300mm long

Leaf blades: 2- 3.5mm wide

== Gallery ==
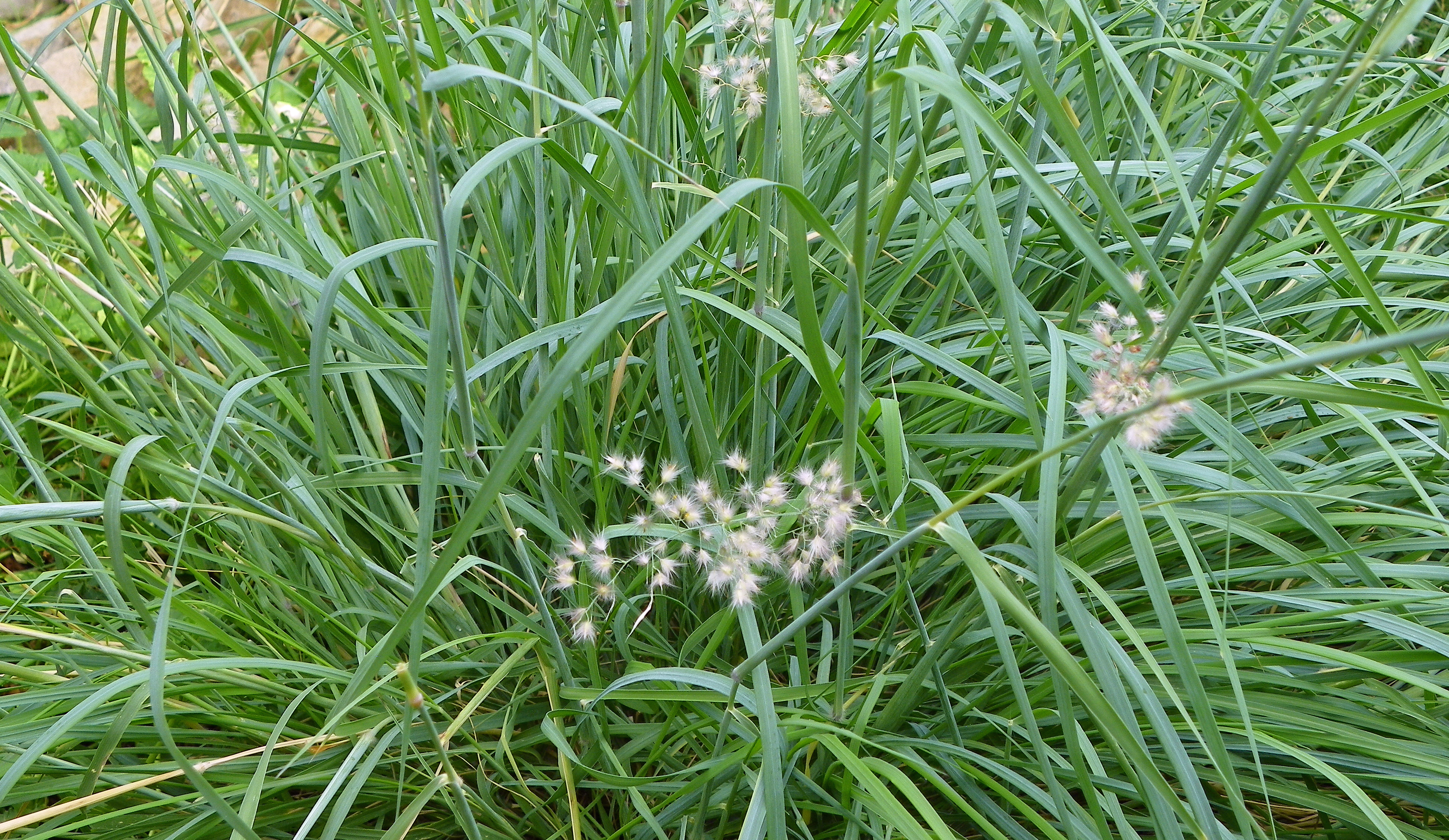
leaves

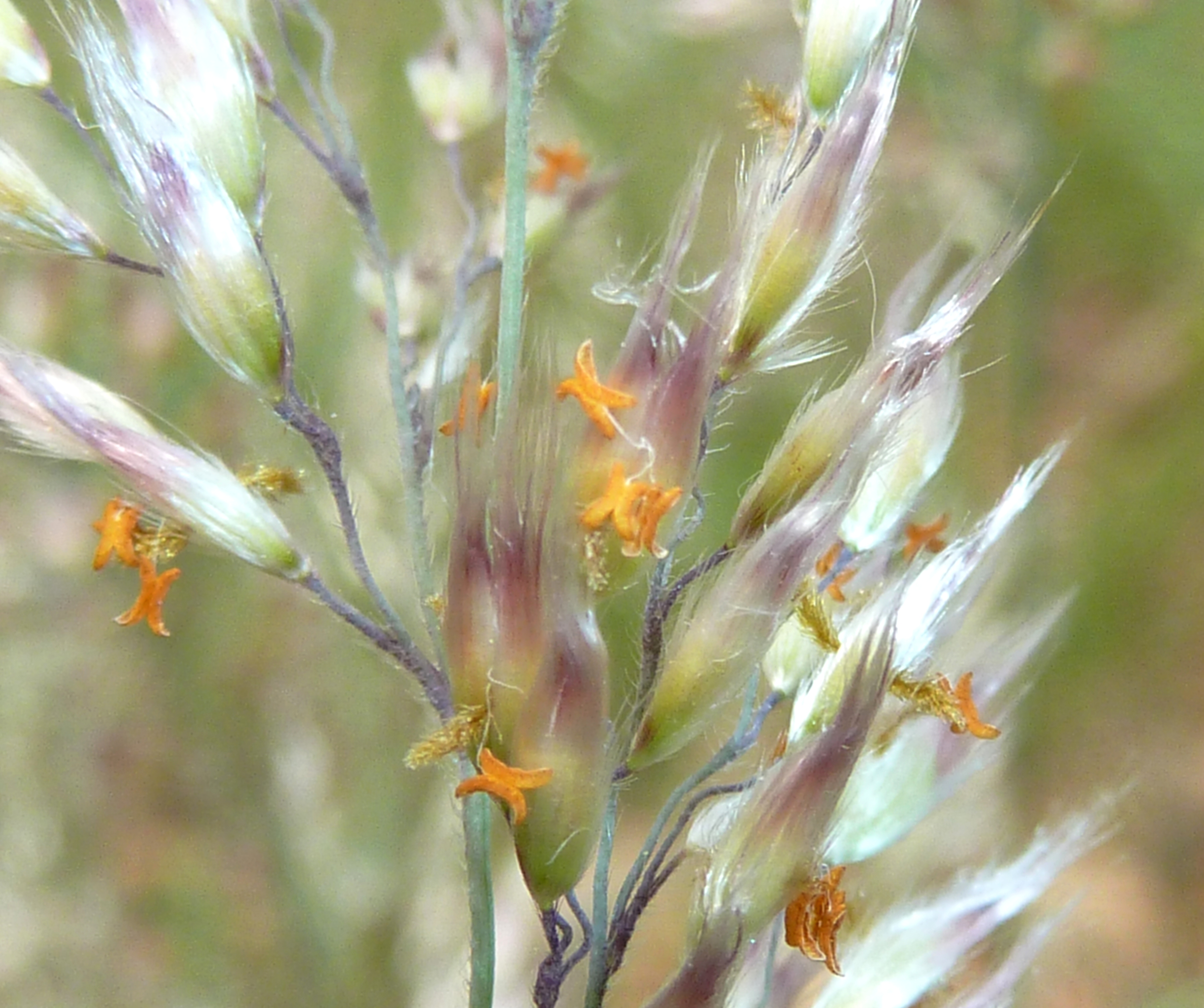
inflorescence

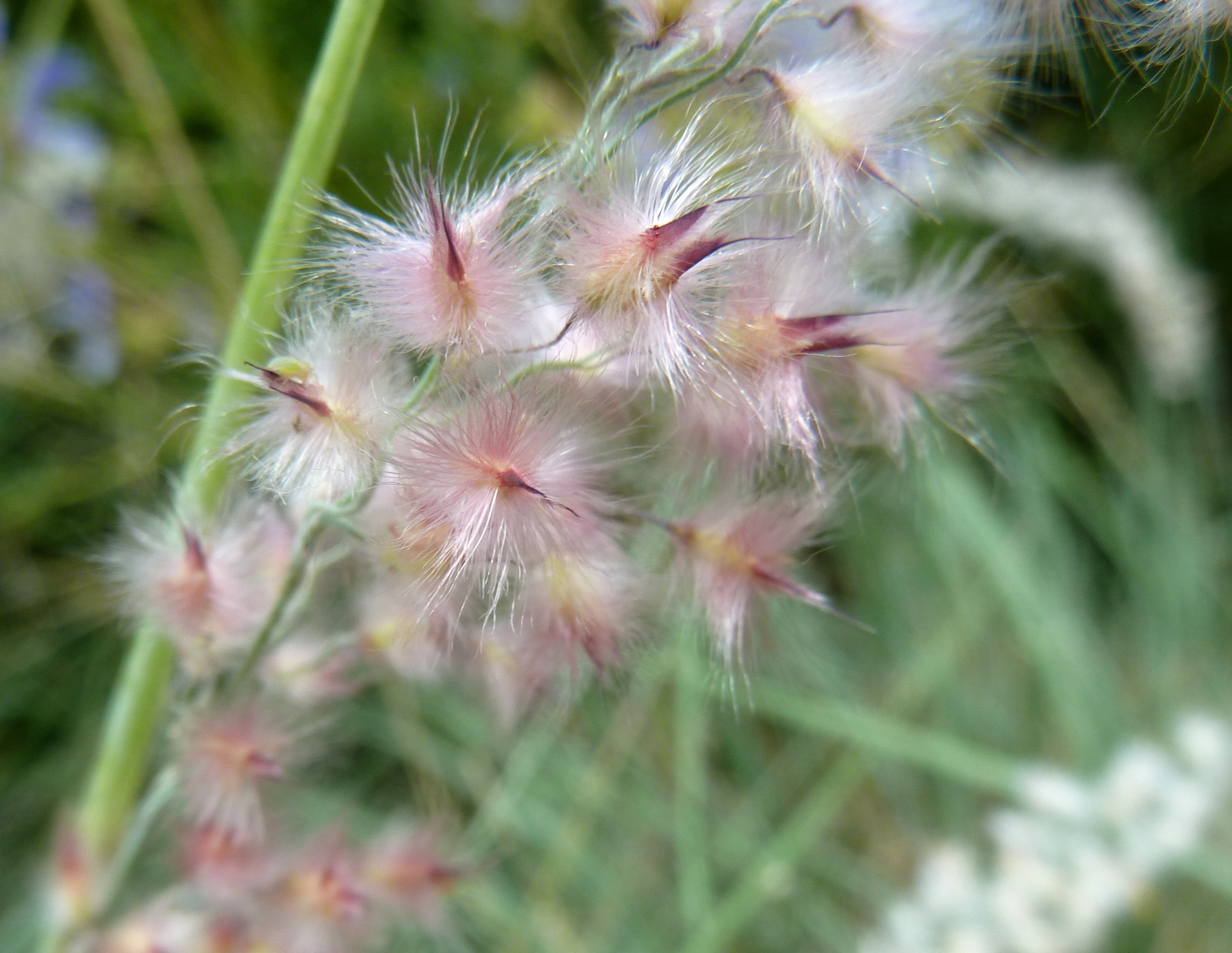
infructescence
