= Tetrarrhena =

Scientific classification
- Kingdom: Plantae
- Clade: Embryophytes
- Clade: Tracheophytes
- Clade: Spermatophytes
- Clade: Angiosperms
- Clade: Monocots
- Clade: Commelinids
- Order: Poales
- Family: Poaceae
- Clade: BOP clade
- Subfamily: Oryzoideae
- Tribe: Ehrharteae
- Genus: Tetrarrhena; R.Br.

Genus of grasses

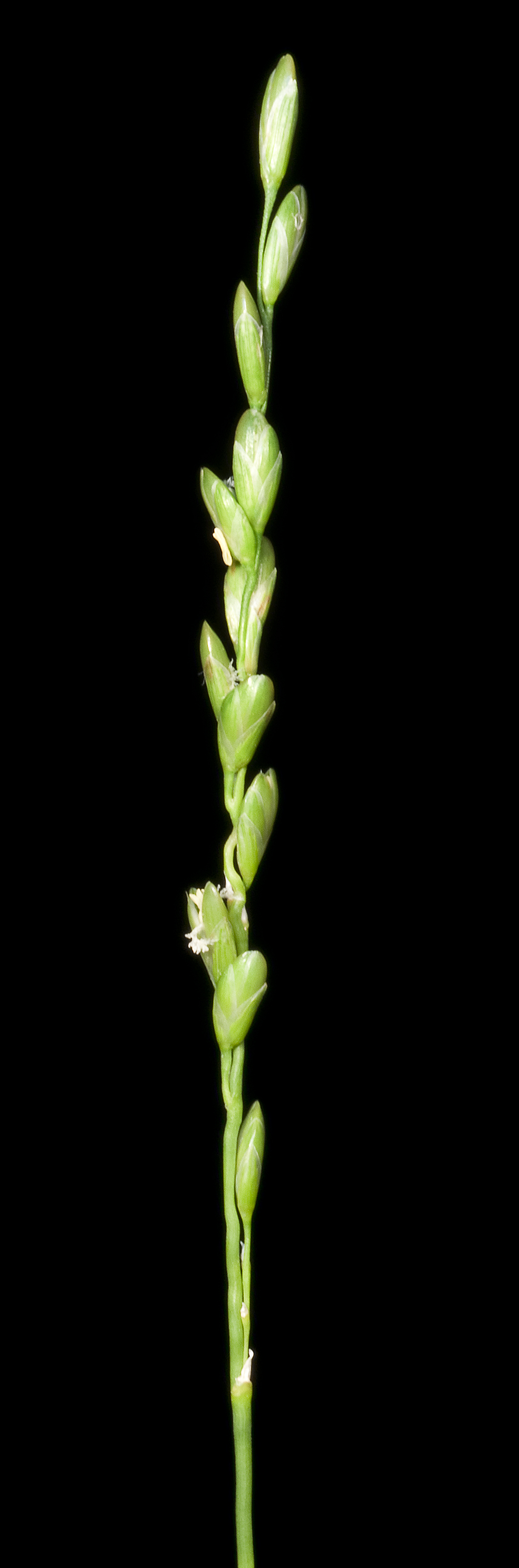
Tetrarrhena laevis

Tetrarrhena is a genus of grasses. It includes six species native to eastern and southern Australia including Tasmania.

== Species ==
Six species are accepted.

- Tetrarrhena acuminata R.Br.
- Tetrarrhena distichophylla (Labill.) R.Br.
- Tetrarrhena juncea R.Br.
- Tetrarrhena laevis R.Br.
- Tetrarrhena oreophila D.I.Morris
- Tetrarrhena turfosa N.G.Walsh
