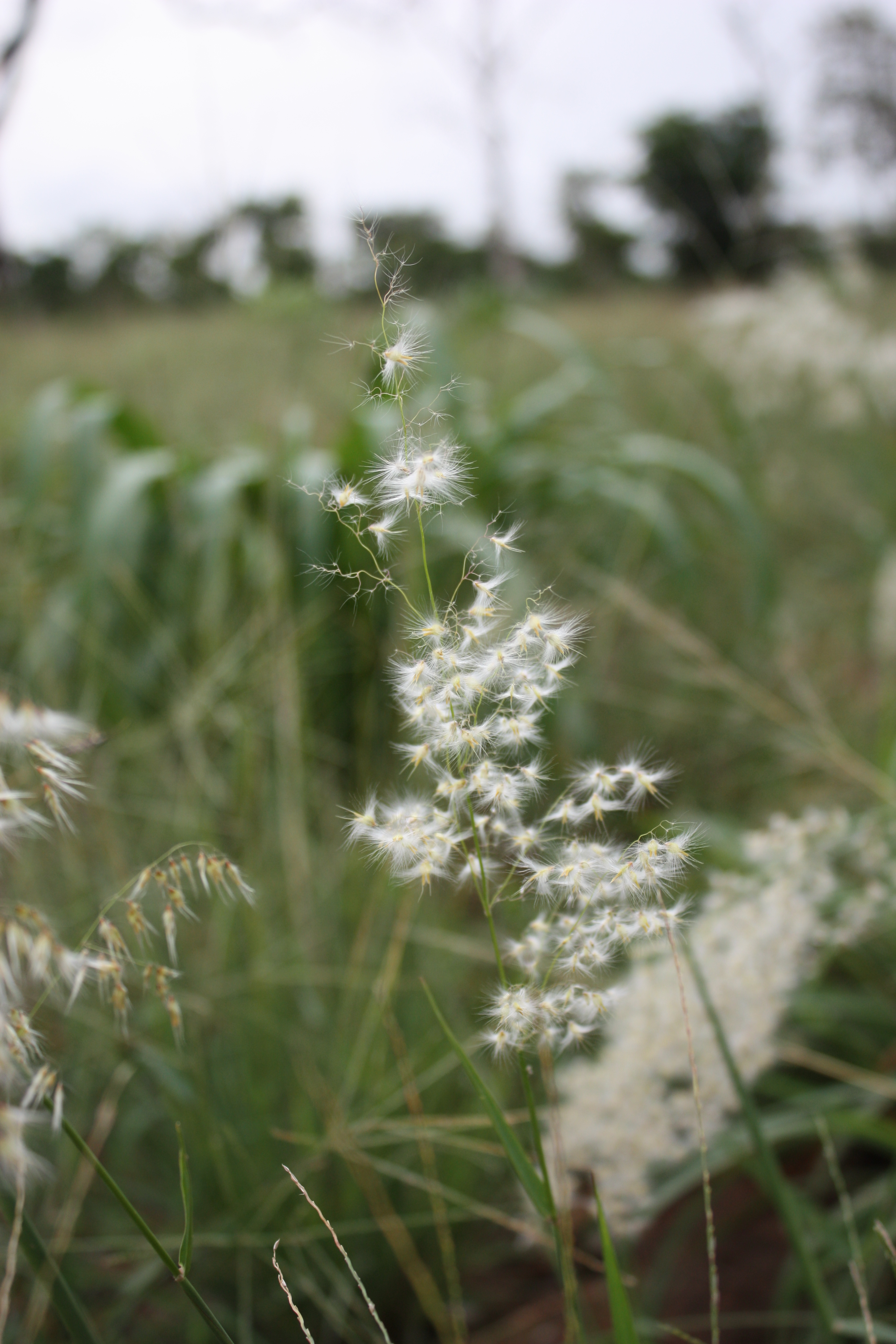
- Melinis repens

Scientific classification
- Kingdom: Plantae
- Clade: Tracheophytes
- Clade: Angiosperms
- Clade: Monocots
- Clade: Commelinids
- Order: Poales
- Family: Poaceae
- Subfamily: Panicoideae
- Supertribe: Panicodae
- Tribe: Paniceae
- Subtribe: Melinidinae
- Genus: Melinis; P.Beauv. (1812)

Type species
- Melinis minutiflora P.Beauv.

Synonyms
- Mildbraediochloa Butzin (1971); Monachyron Parl. ex Hook. (1849); Rhynchelythrum Nees (1836); Suardia Schrank (1820); Tristegis Nees (1820)

= Melinis =

Genus of plants

Melinis is a genus of African and Arabian plants in the grass family.

The generic name is derived from the Greek meline meaning "millet".

== Species ==
23 species are currently accepted:

- Melinis ambigua Hack.
- Melinis amethystea (Franch.) Zizka
- Melinis angolensis Rendle
- Melinis ascendens Mez
- Melinis biaristata (Rendle) Stapf & C.E.Hubb.
- Melinis drakensbergensis (C.E.Hubb. & Schweick.) Clayton
- Melinis effusa (Rendle) Stapf
- Melinis gossweileri C.E.Hubb.
- Melinis kallimorpha (Clayton) Zizka
- Melinis longiseta (A.Rich.) Zizka
- Melinis macrochaeta Stapf & C.E.Hubb.
- Melinis maroccana (Maire & Sam.) M.B.Crespo, M.Á.Alonso & Mart.-Azorín
- Melinis minutiflora P.Beauv.
- Melinis nerviglumis (Franch.) Zizka
- Melinis repens (Willd.) Zizka
- Melinis reynaudioides (C.E.Hubb.) Zizka
- Melinis rupicola (Rendle) Zizka
- Melinis scabrida (K.Schum.) Hack.
- Melinis subglabra Mez
- Melinis tanatricha (Rendle) Zizka
- Melinis tenuissima Stapf
- Melinis tomentosa Rendle
- Melinis welwitschii Rendle

formerly included

numerous species now regarded as better suited to Tricholaena
