= Newcombia philippiana =

Conservation status
- Extinct (IUCN 2.3)

- Possibly Extinct (NatureServe)

Scientific classification
- Kingdom: Animalia
- Phylum: Mollusca
- Class: Gastropoda
- Order: Stylommatophora
- Family: Achatinellidae
- Genus: Newcombia
- Species: †N. philippiana

Binomial name
- †Newcombia philippiana (Pfeiffer, 1857)

Synonyms
- Achatinella philippiana Pfeiffer, 1857

Species of gastropod

Newcombia philippiana was a species of land snail, a gastropod in the family Achatinellidae. It was described by Pfeiffer in 1850 and was endemic to Hawaii.
