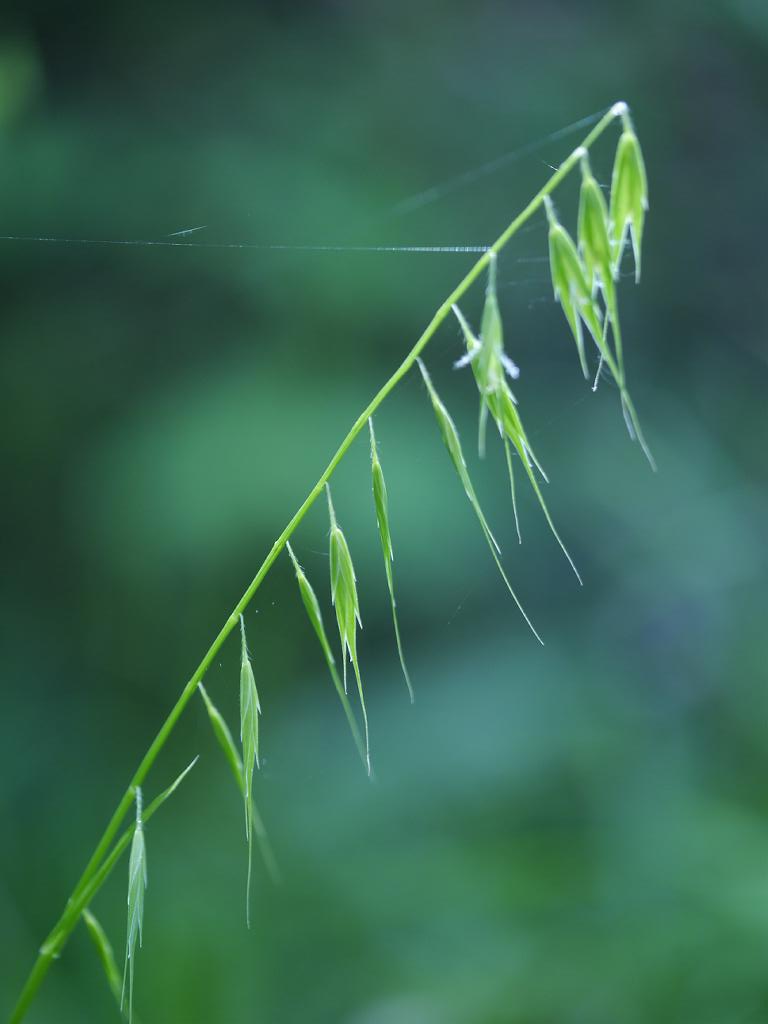

Scientific classification
- Kingdom: Plantae
- Clade: Tracheophytes
- Clade: Angiosperms
- Clade: Monocots
- Clade: Commelinids
- Order: Poales
- Family: Poaceae
- Subfamily: Pooideae
- Tribe: Brylkinieae
- Genus: Brylkinia; F.Schmidt
- Species: B. caudata

Binomial name
- Brylkinia caudata (Munro ex A.Gray) F.Schmidt

Synonyms
- Ehrharta caudata Munro ex A.Gray; Brylkinia schmidtii Ohwi

= Brylkinia =

Genus of grasses

Brylkinia is a genus of East Asian plants in the grass family. The only known species is Brylkinia caudata, native to Japan, China (Sichuan, Jilin), and Russia (Kuril, Sakhalin).

== See also ==
- List of Poaceae genera
