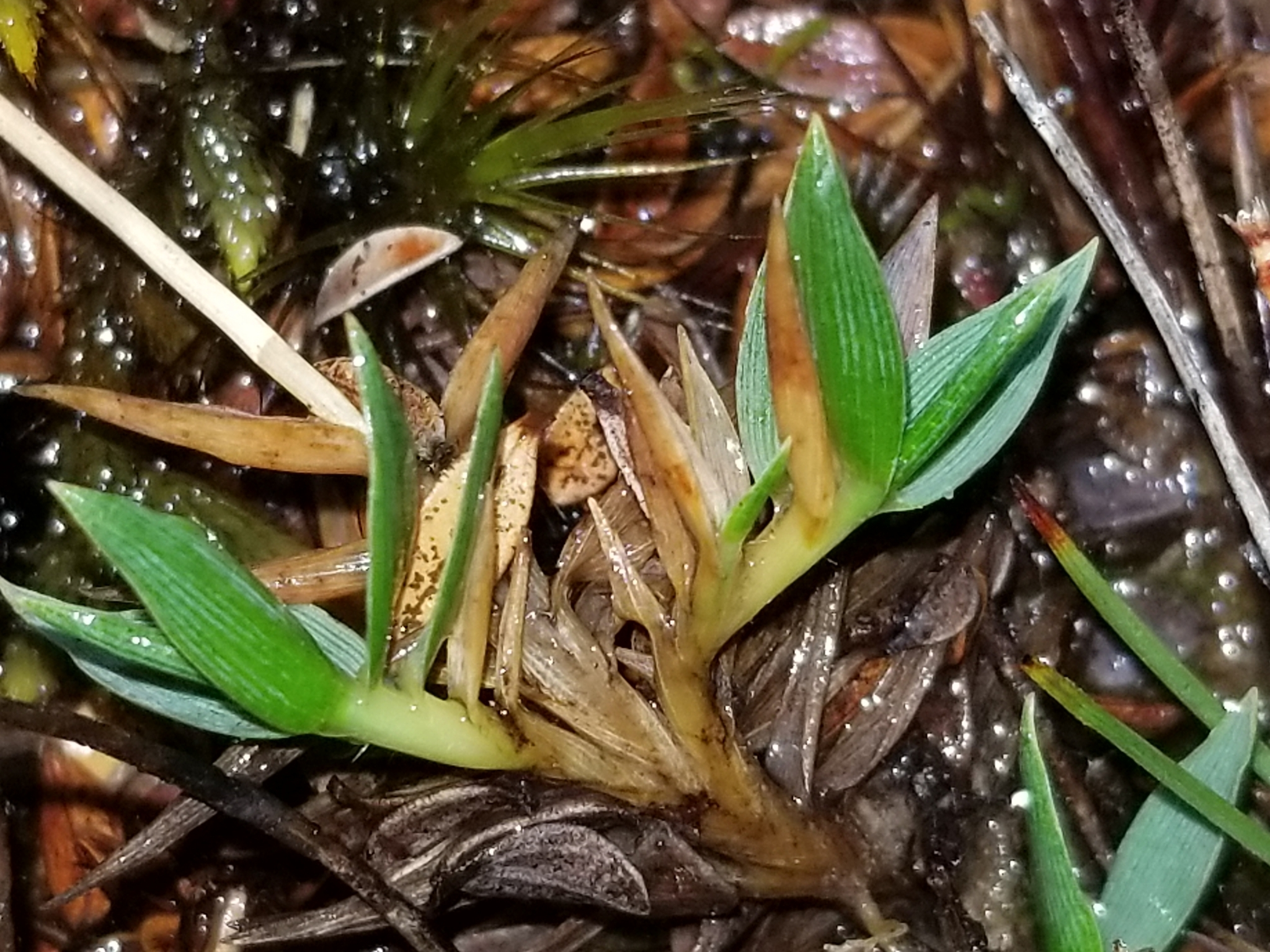
- Zotovia thomsonii

Scientific classification
- Kingdom: Plantae
- Clade: Tracheophytes
- Clade: Angiosperms
- Clade: Monocots
- Clade: Commelinids
- Order: Poales
- Family: Poaceae
- Subfamily: Oryzoideae
- Tribe: Ehrharteae
- Genus: Zotovia; Edgar & Connor

Type species
- Zotovia colensoi (Hook.f.) Edgar & Connor

Synonyms
- Petriella Zotov 1943, illegitimate homonym not Curzi 1930 (a fungus in Microascaceae)

= Zotovia =

Genus of grasses

Zotovia is a genus of plants in the grass family, native to New Zealand (including the Antipodean Islands).

The genus is named for Victor Dmitrievich Zotov (1908–1977), a botanist born in Vladivostok who migrated to New Zealand in 1924.

Species

- Zotovia acicularis Edgar & Connor - South Island
- Zotovia colensoi (Hook.f.) Edgar & Connor - North + South Island
- Zotovia thomsonii (Petrie) Edgar & Connor - South Island, Antipodean Islands
