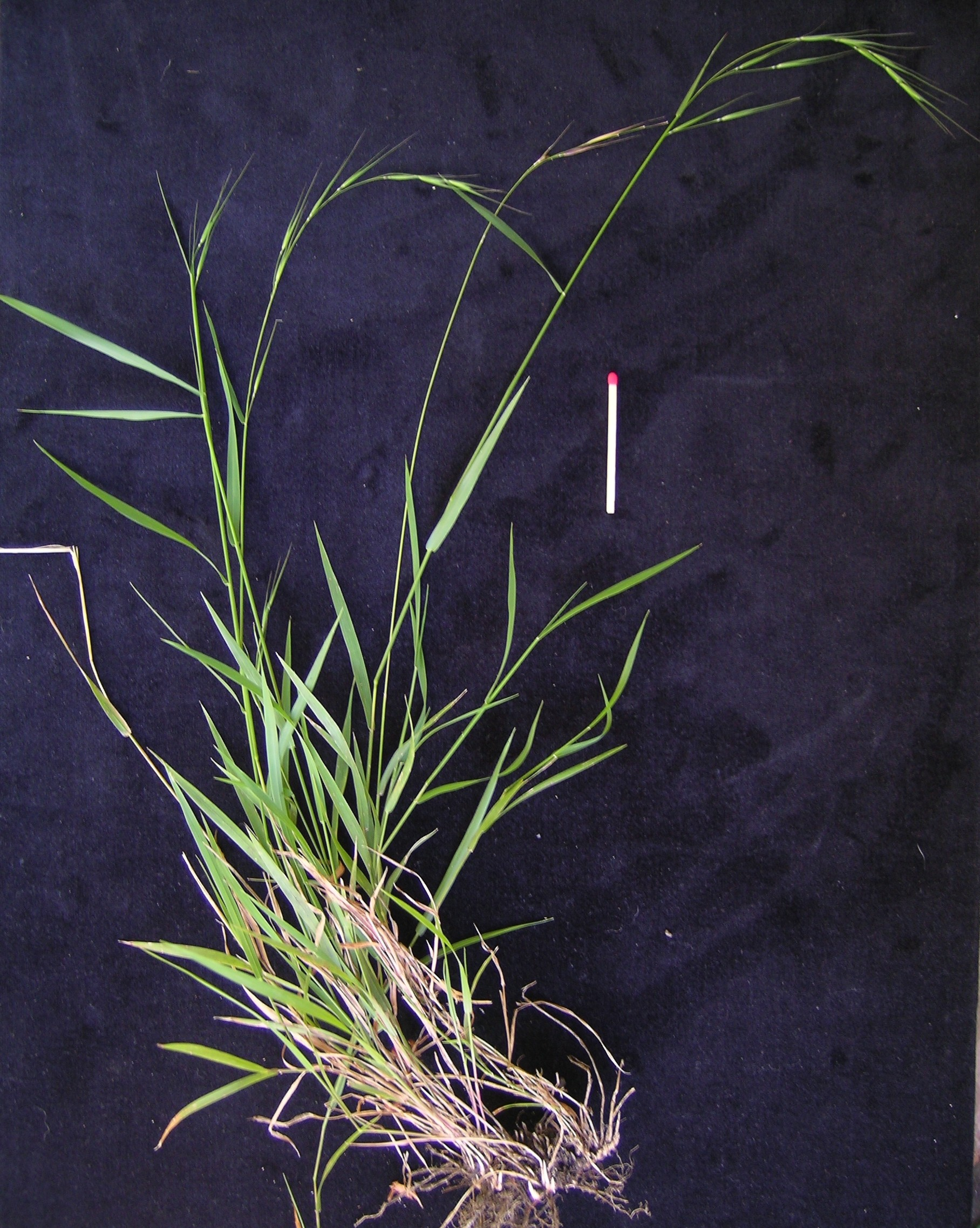
- Microlaena stipoides with a match for size comparison

Scientific classification
- Kingdom: Plantae
- Clade: Tracheophytes
- Clade: Angiosperms
- Clade: Monocots
- Clade: Commelinids
- Order: Poales
- Family: Poaceae
- Subfamily: Oryzoideae
- Tribe: Ehrharteae
- Genus: Microlaena; R.Br.

Species
- See text.

= Microlaena =

Genus of plants

Microlaena is a genus of flowering plant in the family Poaceae, native to areas from Java through Australia to New Zealand. The genus was established by Robert Brown in 1810.

== Species ==
As of January 2023, Plants of the World Online accepted three species:

- Microlaena connorii Renvoize
- Microlaena stipoides (Labill.) R.Br.
- Microlaena tasmanica (Hook.f.) Hook.f. ex Benth.
