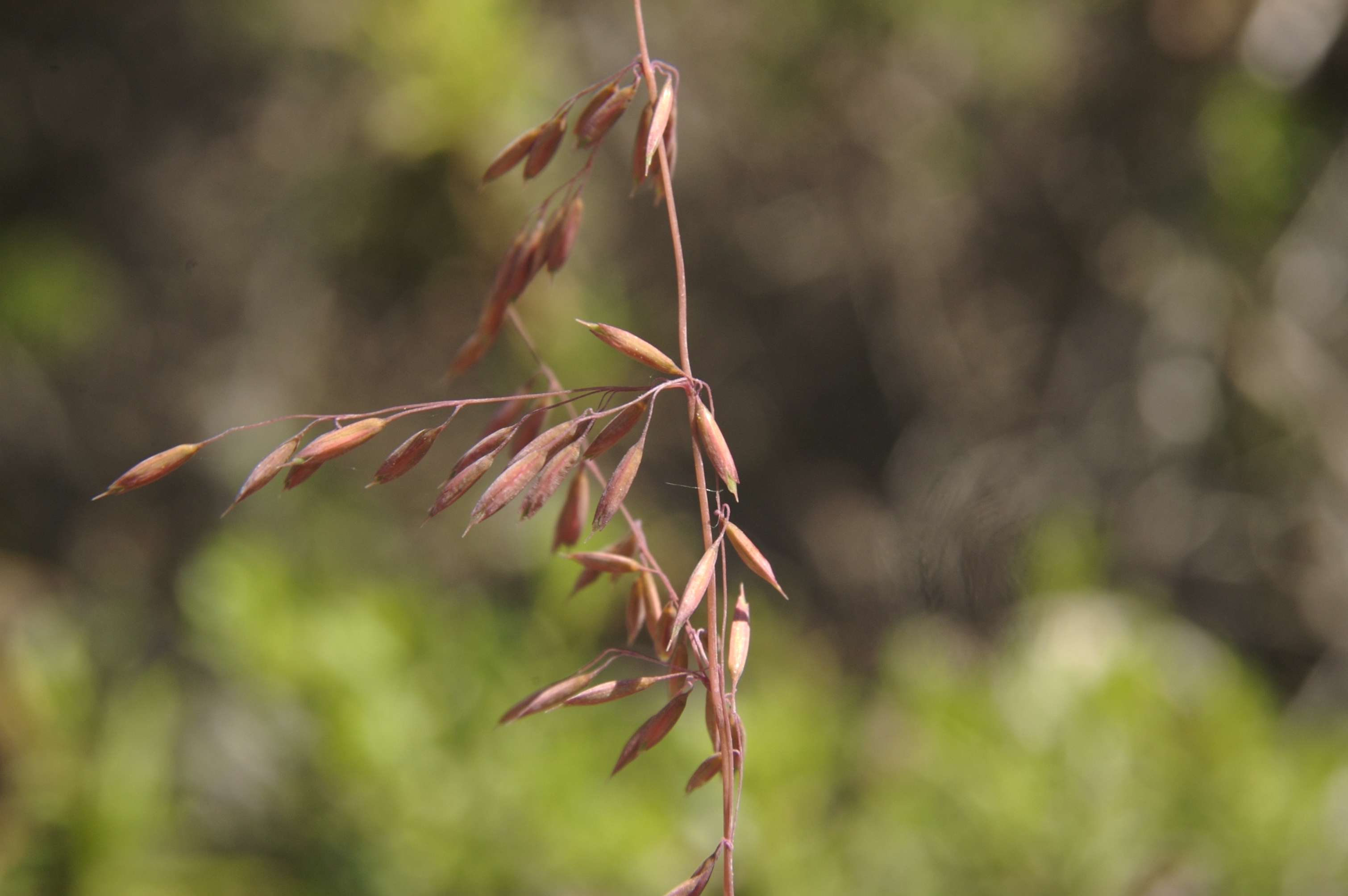

Scientific classification
- Kingdom: Plantae
- Clade: Tracheophytes
- Clade: Angiosperms
- Clade: Monocots
- Clade: Commelinids
- Order: Poales
- Family: Poaceae
- Genus: Ehrharta
- Species: E. calycina

Binomial name
- Ehrharta calycina Sm.

= Ehrharta calycina =

Species of grass

Ehrharta calycina is a species of grass known by the common names perennial veldtgrass and purple veldtgrass.

== Distribution ==
It is native to southern Africa; from South Africa (within the Cape Provinces, Free State and KwaZulu-Natal), Lesotho and Namibia.

It grows in Veld grassland habits and on low-lying sandy areas.

== Description ==
Ehrharta calycina is a highly variable perennial grass, often but not always rhizomatous.

It usually reaches 30–70 centimetres (12–28 in) in height, but is known to grow much taller in favorable conditions.

The inflorescence is a narrow to wide open array of spikelets light in color when new and becoming darker and tinted purple to reddish with age.

== Taxonomy ==
The Latin specific epithet of calycina is derived from calycinus meaning like a calyx or with a prominent calyx. It was first described and published in Pl. Icon. Ined. on table 33 in 1789.

== Introduced / invasive species ==
The grass is an introduced species, including places such as; California, Egypt, Hawaii, India, New South Wales, New Zealand North, Portugal, South Australia, Spain, Tasmania, Texas, Tunisia, Victoria and Western Australia. Sometimes becoming a noxious weed outside its native range.

It is an invasive species in California, where it is an invasive weed of chaparral and coastal sage scrub habitat along the southern and central coastal regions. It was first introduced to Davis in the Sacramento Valley as a drought-tolerant range grass for grazing.

It is also known as an invasive species and weed in parts of Australia.

The species has been added to the list of invasive alien species of Union concern. This means it is now forbidden to trade, import and breed this plant in all Member States of the European Union.
