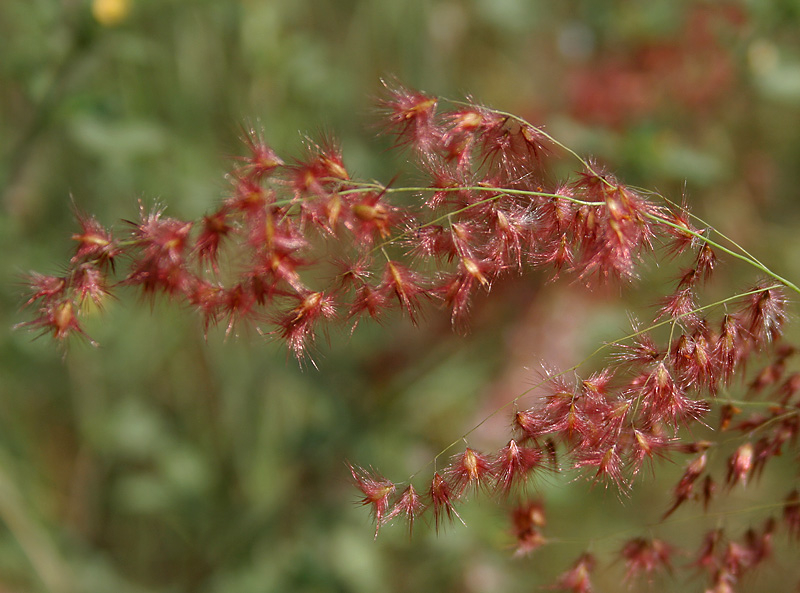

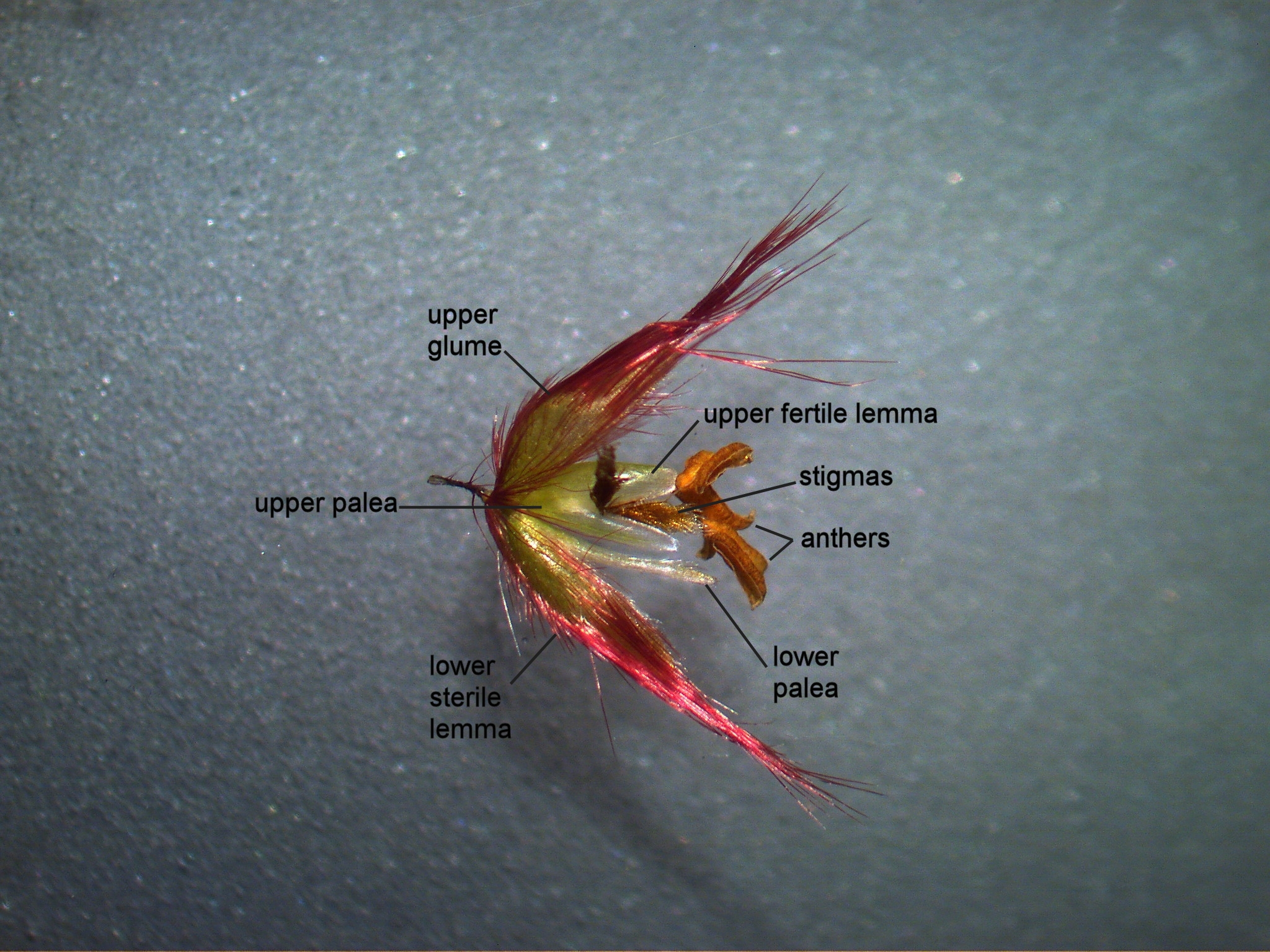

Scientific classification
- Kingdom: Plantae
- Clade: Tracheophytes
- Clade: Angiosperms
- Clade: Monocots
- Clade: Commelinids
- Order: Poales
- Family: Poaceae
- Subfamily: Panicoideae
- Genus: Melinis
- Species: M. repens

Binomial name
- Melinis repens (Willd.) Zizka

Synonyms
- Rhynchelytrum repens Saccharum repens Tricholaena repens Tricholaena rosea

= Melinis repens =

Species of grass

Melinis repens is a species of grass known by the common names rose Natal grass, Natal red top, or simply Natal grass. It is native to southern Africa and an introduced species, often considered a noxious weed, on other continents such as North America and Australia. It is an annual or perennial grass, growing up to a meter tall. Its growth rate is dependent on temperature. The inflorescence is an open array of branches bearing spikelets densely coated in silky white or pink. In Chishona, its name is bhurakwacha.

The Mursi people of Ethiopia call this grass imai. It grows along the banks of the Omo River, and gives its name to the star Delta Crucis, whose heliacal setting is used to determine when the Omo will flood and rise high enough to flatten the imai grass.
