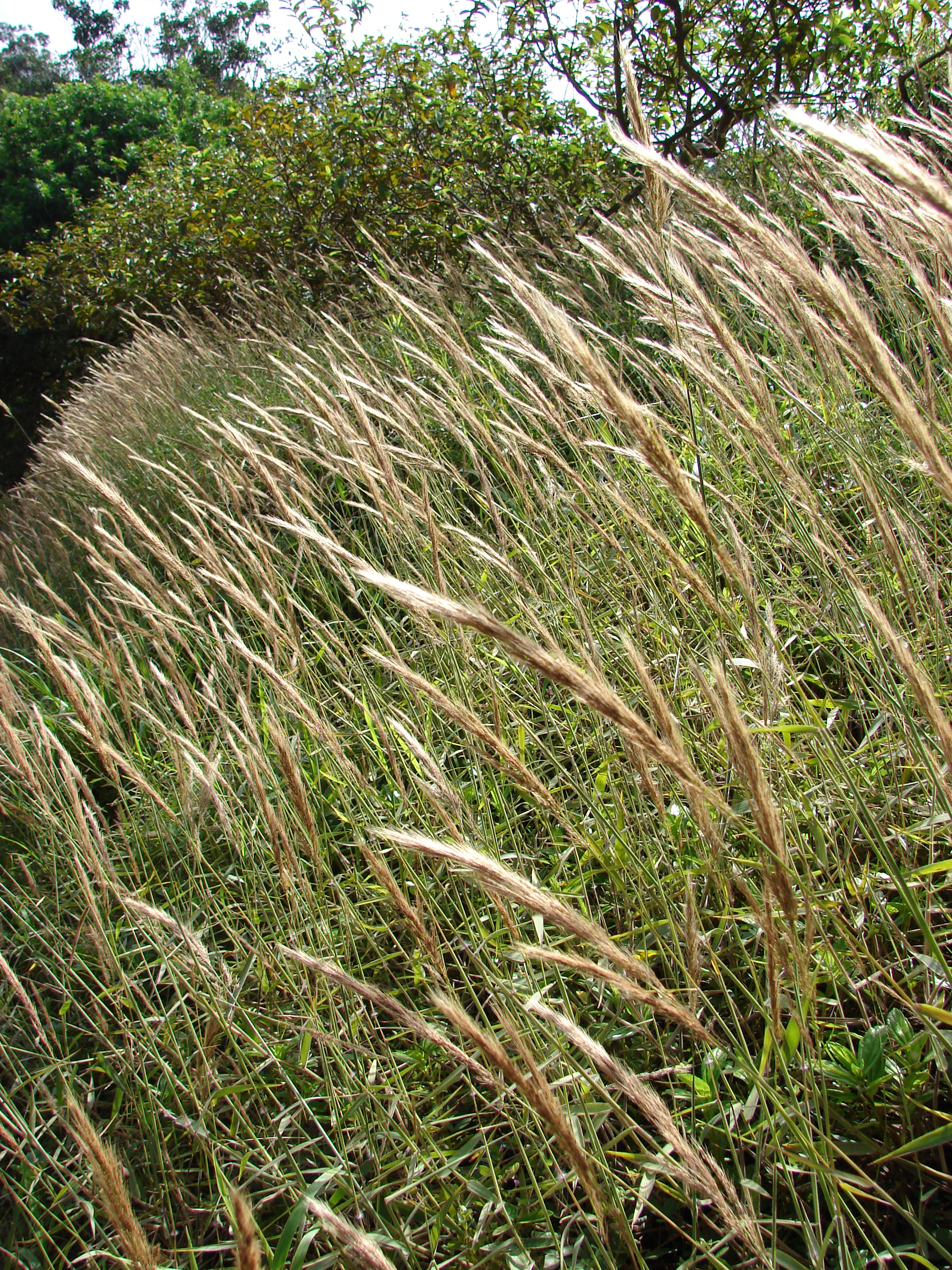

Scientific classification
- Kingdom: Plantae
- Clade: Tracheophytes
- Clade: Angiosperms
- Clade: Monocots
- Clade: Commelinids
- Order: Poales
- Family: Poaceae
- Subfamily: Panicoideae
- Genus: Melinis
- Species: M. minutiflora

Binomial name
- Melinis minutiflora P.Beauv.

= Melinis minutiflora =

Species of grass

Melinis minutiflora, commonly known as molasses grass, is a species of grass.

It is a perennial grass native to Africa, where it occurs in disjunct populations (an arc from central Angola to Cameroon in western central Africa, the areas around Ruwenzori Mountains and Mount Kenya in eastern Africa. Its seeds are dispersed by wind. Molasses grass usually grows to be thirty to sixty inches tall, and it forms mats when its long, slender stems lay on top of each other in layers up to four feet deep. Molasses grass can spread up other plants, using them as support, like a vine. It has fragrant foliage and colorful inflorescences. It blooms for short periods with differing bloom times depending on where the grass is located. Molasses grass generally flowers in the Southern Hemisphere between April and June and in the Northern Hemisphere in November.

== Role as a non-native species ==
It was introduced to tropical areas such as Hawaii for livestock feed, and is now naturalized in some areas. Around 1812, molasses grass took root in Brazil and spread through abandoned coffee plantations. Similarly, around 1900, molasses grass was introduced in Hawaii for cattle grazing. In Hawaii, it continued to spread, though its spread was hindered by feral goats. It is considered an invasive species in many parts of the world, including some Pacific Islands and South America.

Molasses grass plays a large role in fire ecology in the regions where it grows. In the Brazilian savanna (Cerrado) this species is invasive and dominant due to the increased frequency of fire. When a wild fire occurs, molasses grass is very quick to colonize the disturbed area. Examples of this are seen in almost every region where molasses grass is found, including Australia, Brazil and Hawaii, where molasses grass even increases the risk of fire in the areas in which it establishes. Molasses grass increases the likelihood of fires where it has established because it is brittle and burns easily. This cycle where molasses grass establishes, burns easily, then reestablishes and burns again is known as the grass/fire cycle, and it undermines native plants' ability to grow and thrive in their native environment. One result of this cycle is a drop in biodiversity in the affected area.
