= Rice production in Vietnam =

Rice production is a cornerstone of Vietnam's economy, with the Mekong and Red River deltas serving as the primary regions for cultivation. As one of the world's largest rice producers, Vietnam contributes about 5% of global rice production. Rice feeds over 90% of Vietnam population but also contributes about half of the country’s agricultural emissions. Vietnam is piloting one million hectare of low-emission, high-quality rice. It is seeking ways to overcome barriers to sustainable rice farming.

Vietnam is one of the world's richest agricultural regions and is the second-largest exporter worldwide (after Thailand) and the world's seventh-largest consumer of rice. The Mekong Delta is the heart of the rice-producing region of the country where water, boats, houses and markets coexist to produce a generous harvest of rice. Vietnam's land area of 33 million ha, has three ecosystems that dictate rice culture. These are the southern delta (with its Mekong Delta dominating rice coverage), the northern delta (the tropical monsoon area with cold winters) and the highlands of the north (with upland rice varieties). The most prominent irrigated rice system is the Mekong Delta. Rice is a staple of the national diet and is seen as a "gift from God".

The Mekong River and its tributaries are crucial to rice production in Vietnam. A total of 12 provinces constitute the Mekong Delta, popularly known as the "Rice Bowl" of Vietnam, which contain some 17 million people and 80% of them are engaged in rice cultivation. The delta produced bountiful harvest of about 20 million tons in 2008, about a half of the country's total production. The Rice Bowl has assured food security to its population whose 75% of daily calories are met by rice, which is also the staple diet of nearly 50% of the world's population.

Within the delta system dominated by rice, now the farming system also includes activities related to aquaculture, rearing of animals, cash crops and fruit trees. Under aquaculture, fresh and saline water shrimp are raised within the paddy rice fields. As a further environmental zoning of the delta, mangrove forests are also developed.

== Geographical setting ==
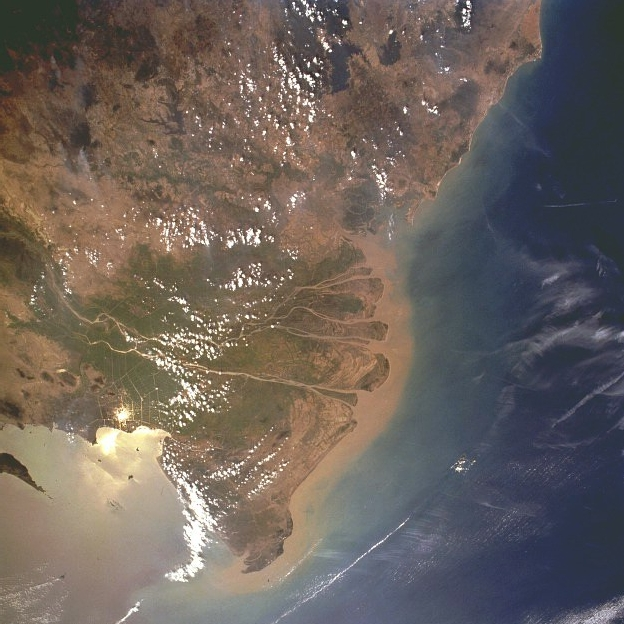
Mekong River Delta – an aerial view

In the geographical region of Vietnam which has a total land area of 33 million ha, there are three ecosystems that dictate rice-growing culture. These are: the southern delta that dominates rice coverage which has a warm and humid climate throughout the year with sunshine, the northern delta with tropical monsoon area with cold winters with rainfed and flood prone rice varieties; and highlands of the north which has upland rice varieties; and the percentage distribution of area grown in the three ecosystems are 60, 32 and 8 respectively.

The Mekong Delta formed by the Mekong River, which is Vietnam's rice bowl, is the delta region situated to the south of Ho Chi Minh City (Saigon). It outfalls into the sea in southern Vietnam and constitutes 12 provinces of the Mekong Delta. Delta is formed by the huge amount of rich and beneficial silt brought in by the Mekong River; this deposit is so large that the shore line is said to extend by 80 metres (260 ft) annually. Deltas are formed when a river joins the sea or a lake. The formation is subject to the amount of sediments that are carried by the rivers. As the deltas build up over the years, they get formed in the shape of a triangle and the deposits in this formation are of rich alluvium, which are ideally suited for growing wet rice, as is done now extensively in the Mekong Delta where farmers and fishermen live to pursue their vocation of farming and aqua culture.

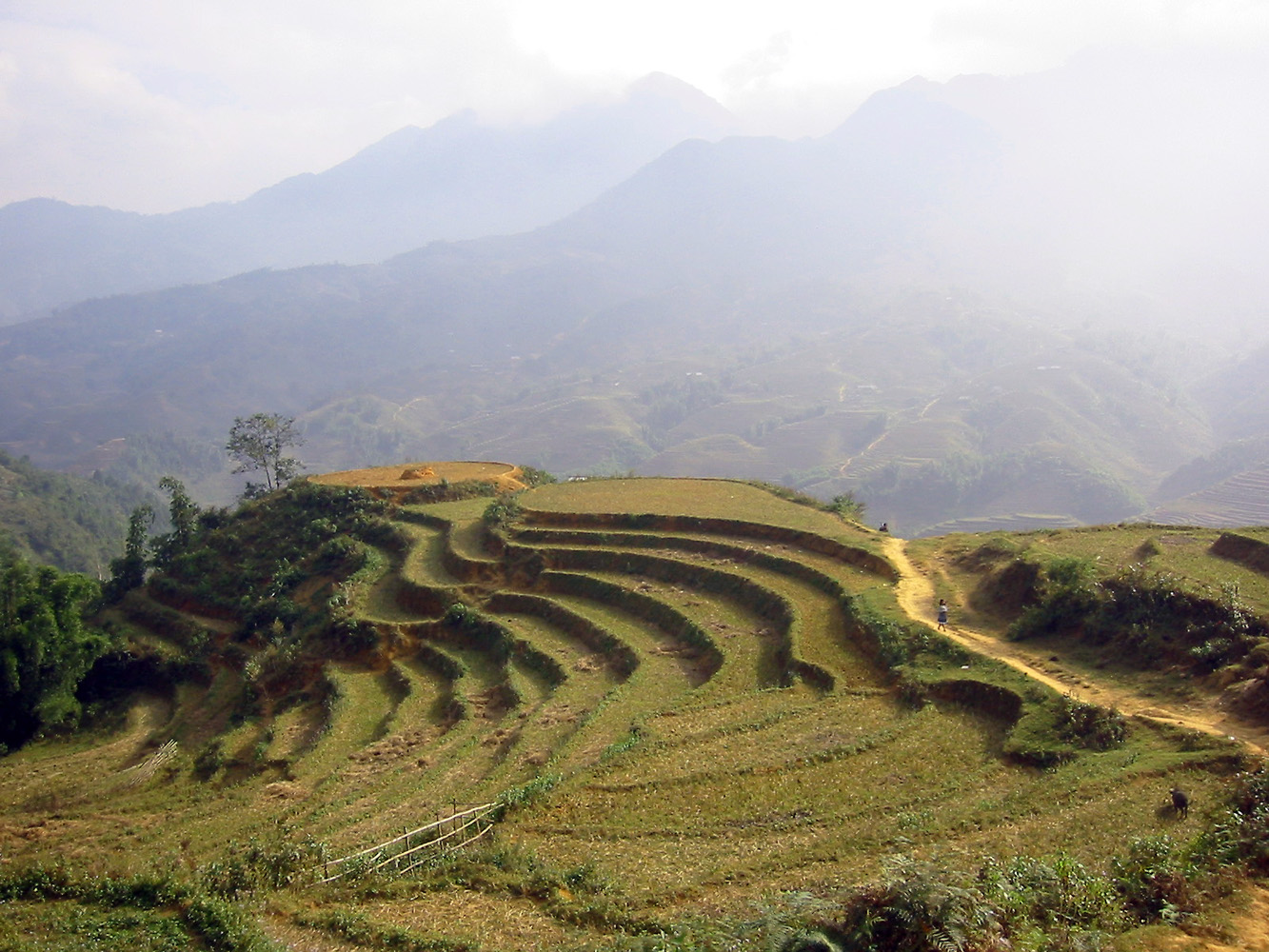
Landscape in Sa Pa

The Mekong River rises in the Tibetan plateau. In its total river course of 4,350 kilometres (2,700 mi) it encompasses six countries of Southeast Asia. The river initially traverses through Myanmar and then forms the border between Laos and Thailand, then flows through Cambodia (Phnom Penh), enters Vietnam and forms the third largest delta in the world – the Mekong Delta – before debouching into the South China Sea. While flowing through Cambodia, the river splits into two branches, namely the Hậu Giang (meaning: the lower river) and the Tiền Giang (meaning: the upper river); the Hậu Giang River is also known as the Bassac River, which flows to the sea after passing through Châu Đốc (near the river border at Vĩnh Xương and land border at Xa Xia near Hà Tiên), Long Xuyên and Cần Thơ; the Tien Giang, the upper river, meanders through several branches, which gives Mekong the Vietnamese name of "Song Cuu Long", meaning "River of Nine Dragons". Tonlé Sap lake from Cambodia also drains into the river at Phnom Penh – the lake which fills up during high flood stages due to back up flow in the Mekong River during the flood season (hence acts as a flood storage reservoir) and drains down only when the flood recedes. The Deltaic formation with an elevation range of 0–3 metres (0.0–9.8 ft) is a flat landscape of "emerald green, it looks as if it were carpeted in AstroTurf."

The flow in the river varies from a low of 1,900 cubic metres per second (67,000 cu ft/s) in the lean season to a high of 38,000 cubic metres per second (1,300,000 cu ft/s), usually during September at the fag end of the flood season. Flood disasters have been frequent in the river causing losses in rice paddy cultivation and also coffee crops apart from other losses to infrastructure and property. Because of the flood conditions in the flat low terrain of the delta, houses are built on stilts and roads are taken over embankments. More frequently, canal systems flowing through the delta are used for transportation and for this purpose they are regularly dredged and made navigable. The Mekong Delta is least prone to catastrophic storms as compared to similar rice growing delta regions such as the Irrawaddy River in Myanmar.

Apart from rice, the delta is also used for commercial fishing (giant catfish is the most popular, known as ‘Mekong catfish’ could grow up to 3 metres (9.8 ft)). Irrawaddy dolphins are found in the higher reaches of the river in Cambodia and Laos. Other aqua fauna found in the river delta are many species of: turtles, water snakes, and insects. The delta is also the source of animal products of pigs, ducks, chickens, and cattle.

Important places of interest in the Mekong Delta are: Vĩnh Long homesteads, Mỹ Tho (gateway to the Mekong Delta, a town founded in 1680 originally by the Chinese refugees, now inhabited by locals practicing vocations of fishing and rice cultivation), and Bến Tre town and canals, Khmer pagodas, Trà Vinh – Mekong's first inhabitants, floating fish farms, Cham villages near the town of Châu Đốc, Phú Quốc island and many more sights.

== Vietnamese legends regarding rice ==
Rice is called ‘white gold’ in Vietnam and has a link to the Sanskrit name ‘Dhanya’ (meaning: "the sustainer of the human race"), the name given to rice in India. In Vietnam, there is folklore that is based on rice. According to the folk legend, in ancient times, rice was not produced but was summoned by fervent prayers by people. Rice would appear from the heaven in the form of a large ball in every house. On one occasion, a lady was sweeping the floor of her house as ordered by her husband to welcome the rice ball. The large rice ball landed in the house when the lady was still sweeping and it hit the broom and then broke into many pieces. Since then people of Vietnam had to work hard with their hands to grow rice.

== History ==
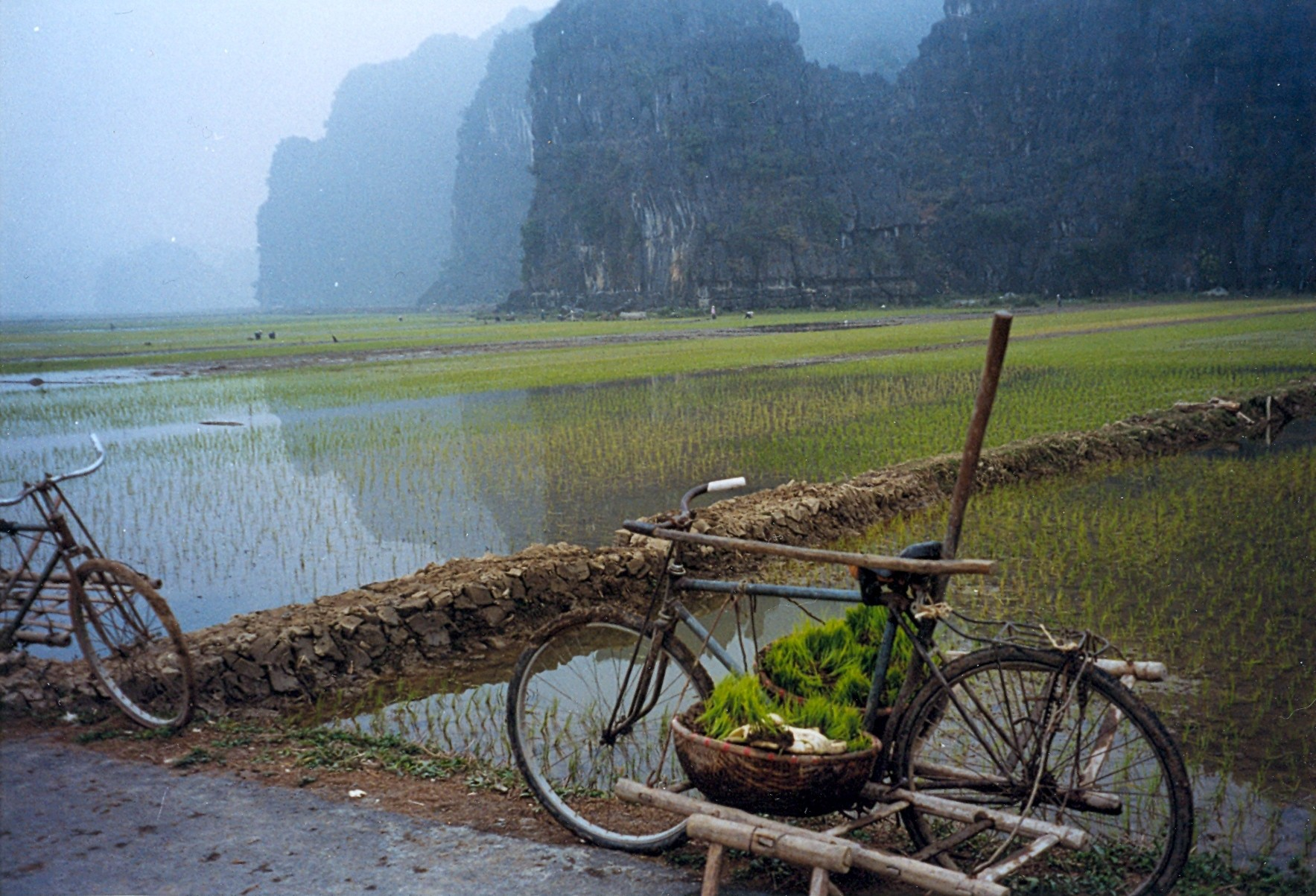
Fields in Ninh Bình Province

It is not known exactly when rice-growing tribes in Vietnam appeared, but it can be guessed that it happened in the middle of the Neolithic period, about 7,000-6,000 years ago. Because at that time there were no livestock or effective agricultural tools, prehistoric people had to use human strength and grind stone tools to overcome nature for production.

The French colonized Vietnam in the middle of the 19th century with the basic objective of exporting rice grown in the delta to meet its large costs of colonisation. They developed a maze of canal systems in the delta to grow three rice crops in a year.

During the World War II when the Japanese occupied Vietnam and exploited the rich delta by exporting rice to their country, it denied nearly several million Vietnamese of their basic staple. While Vietnam was occupied by Japan, the Allies, especially the United States, often bombed roads, making the transport of rice from the south to the north extremely hard. Both France and Japan forcibly hoarded food from farmers to feed their troops, while the French administration was broken and unable to supply and distribute the food. The inadequate food supply caused the famine in Vietnam; starting with 1943, peaking in March–May 1945 and continuing till the end of Pacific war there was unprecedented starvation. Two million Vietnamese people were reported to have died of starvation which was attributed to the Japanese rule which was further compounded by unprecedented floods. In March 1945, Japan overthrew the French colonial administration and sponsored a semi-independent Vietnamese government, the Empire of Vietnam, headed by Trần Trọng Kim. While this government tried to alleviate the suffering, they were unable to make drastic changes because Japan maintained its wartime agricultural policies that reserved rice for military needs.

View chart definition.
Rice production (1000 tons) 1955–74
South Vietnam,
North Vietnam

Rice production stalled in both parts of the divided Vietnam in the 1960s with Vietnam War inflicting great disruptions in acreage. South Vietnam in particular became an importer by 1965 but output did rise in the 1970s.

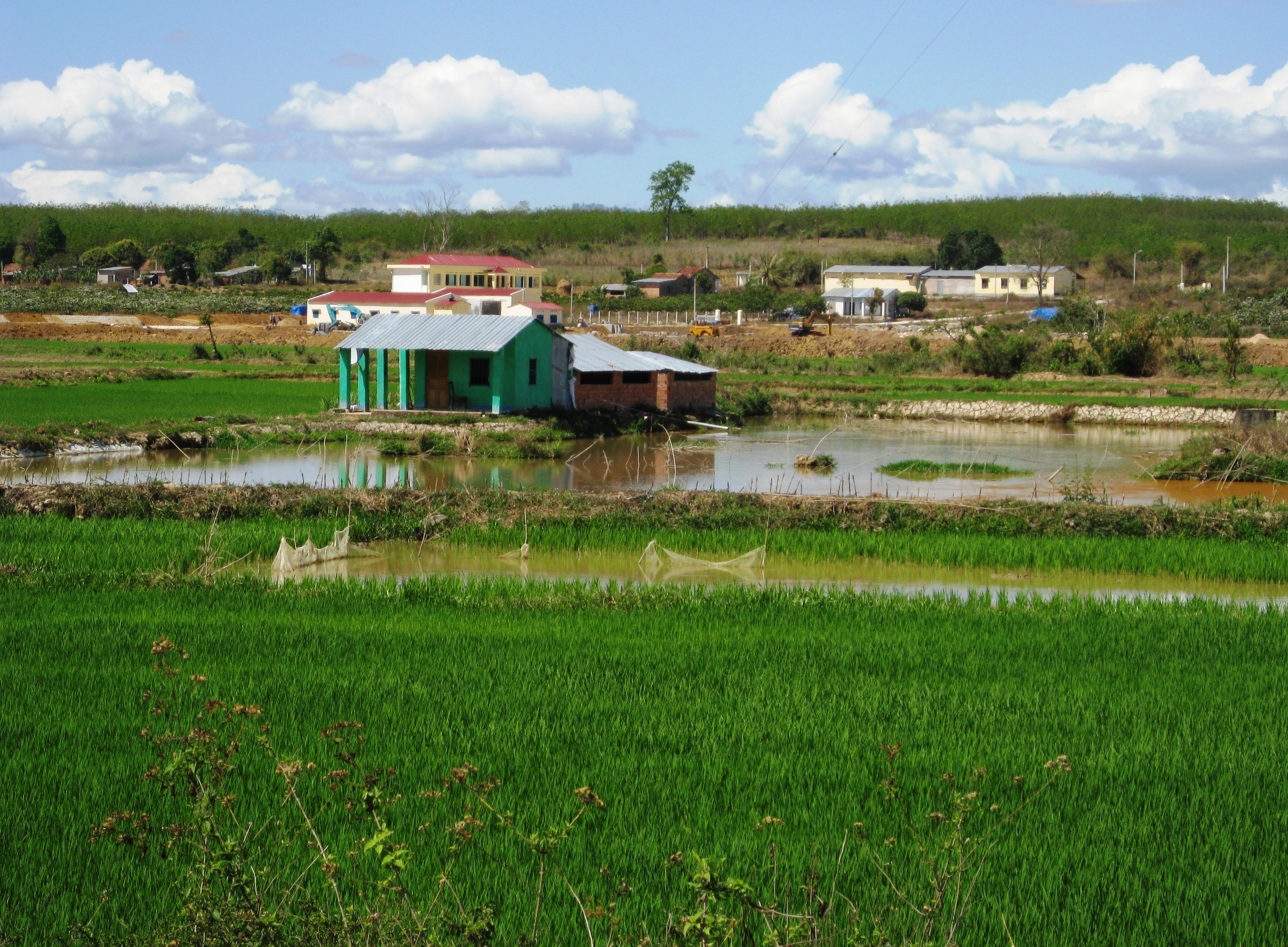
A rice farm

At the end of the 2nd Indochina War in 1975, the country faced acute hardships, as under the Communist regime, cooperative farming through communes was established. Lower-ranking members of the Communist Party of Vietnam were entrusted managerial responsibility for the development of the Mekong delta in South Vietnam. The government also supplied to the farmers seeds, fertilizer and other essentials. As this helped the poor farmers, it was popularly called "the iron rice bowl" – this allegory was meant to convey that " no one would get rich by this system, there was a promise that every person would be cared for by the government...a system where no one would fall through the cracks" Thus, all rice growing fields of the delta became the state property; even a ration of 80 kilograms (180 lb) was forced on the people wanting to buy and carry rice from the delta, which was strictly monitored at police check posts. This condition was further aggravated by devastating floods and insect infestation of large fields.

Realising the folly of State Control, the Government of Vietnam, in 1986, allowed the farmers "to grow and sell their rice". Sure enough there was an incentive to the farmers to grow rice in the delta and Vietnam became one of the leading exporters of Rice. Since then many Legal Constructs have been enacted in Vietnam as a part of Wetland Development, of which the most significant is the Land Law (1994) that gave rights to the farmers, which resulted in an accelerated growth of the Mekong Delta and increase in income to the people. Consequently, the delta is intensely populated. The inhabitants of the delta are mostly constituted by the ethnic Vietnamese with Chinese, Khmers and Chams forming the minority groups. The government gave a lease of 50 years to the farmers to own the land and farmers were also allowed to sub-let their land to others. This helped in transferring the lands from the cooperatives to the individual families, and this act of the government has "created a land market."

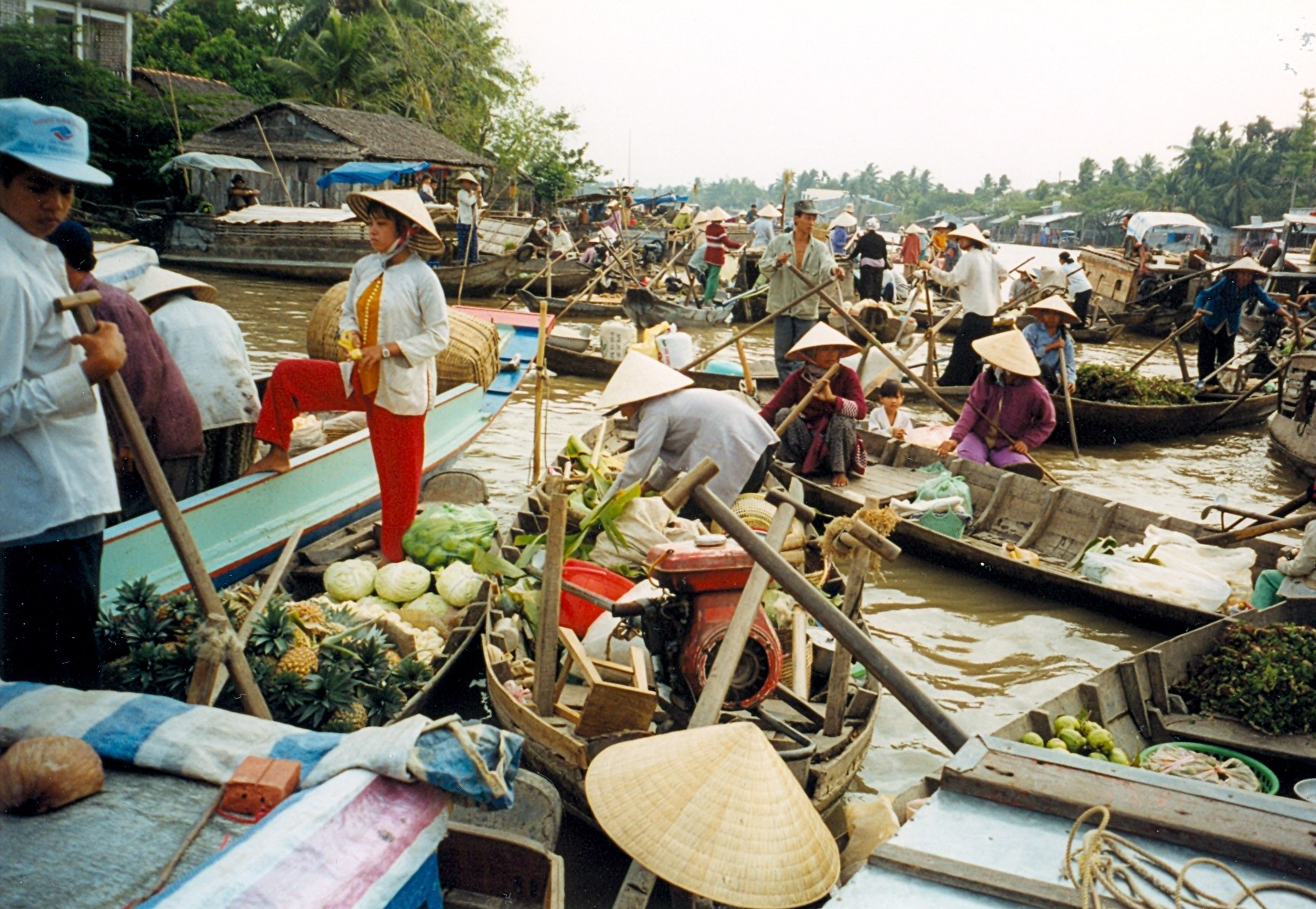
A floating market in the delta

The Mekong Delta, also categorized as a wetland, has now attracted large investments from both government and private sectors to develop and maintain not only the canal system but also expand the ambit of agricultural development to include aquaculture in conjunction with wetland rice. The delta also "nourishes the cultivation of sugar cane, fruit and coconut."

=== 2010 drought ===
During 2008, the Vietnam Food Association, had set a target of record production of 36.5 million tonnes of rice. According to the United Nations Development Programme in Vietnam and Ministry of Agriculture and Rural Development (Vietnam), the industry was under serious threat in 2010 due to a heat wave of above 35 °C for at least three consecutive months. This weather phenomenon is attributed to the El Niño effect. The Yunnan region in China which forms the upper region of the river basin has also experienced drought conditions and the reservoirs do not have storages to release even though they are used for non consumptive use of generating hydropower. River levels were critically low, putting at least 100,000 hectares of land at risk, with as much as 500,000 to 800,000 hectares of rice-producing areas potentially endangered if the drought persisted.

In 2010, Vietnam's rice exports in January and February fell 24.9% to an estimated 781,000 tonnes and revenues also dropped 6.8% to $437 million. Rice exports in the first quarter were forecast to fall by between 33 and 41% to 1.15–1.2 million tonnes. The situation was grim and as Mekong Region Commission, a regional inter-government agency, stated, "that countries of the region are not as familiar with drought management as with flood preparedness".

== Production ==
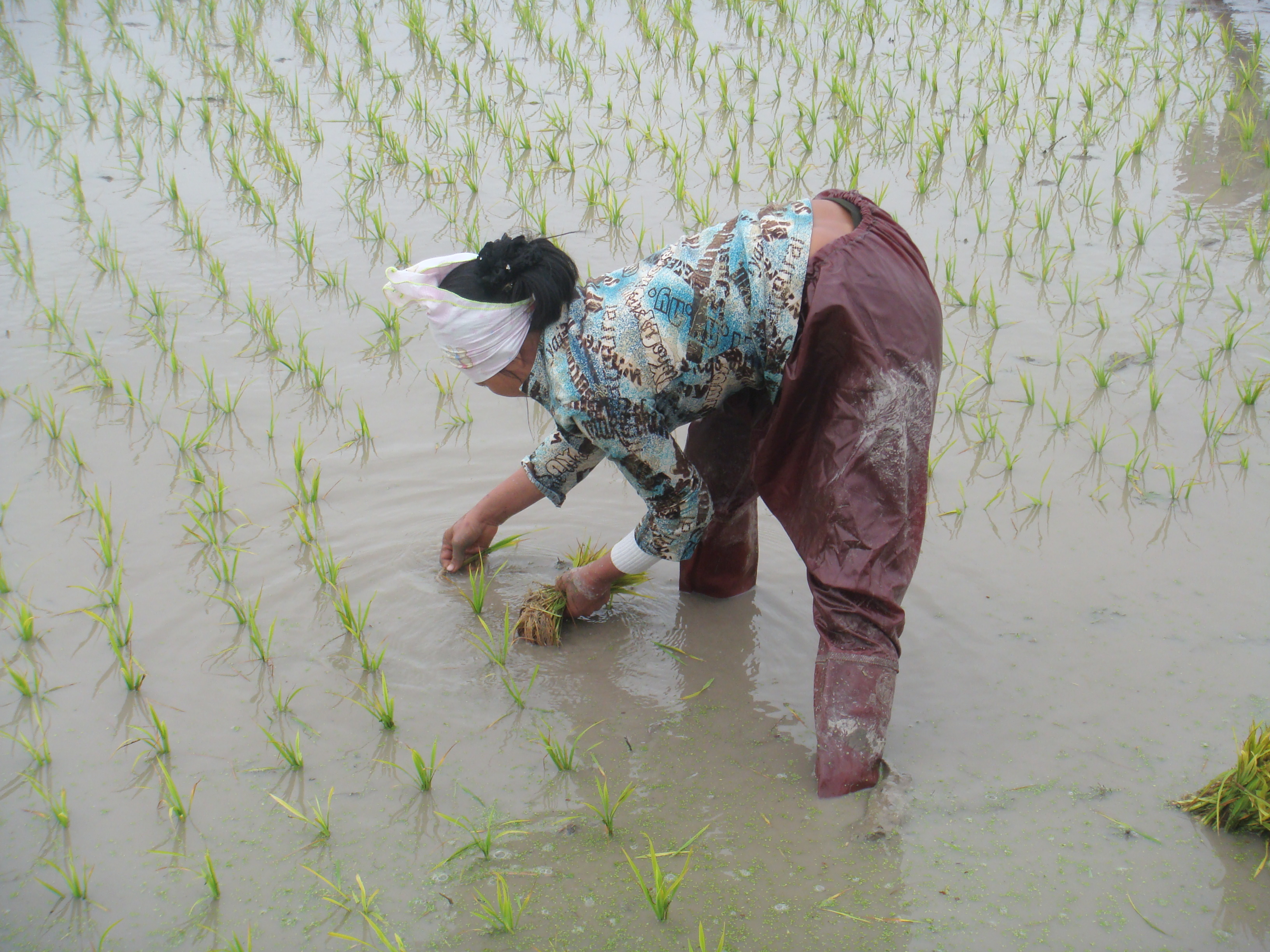
Transplanting rice seedlings

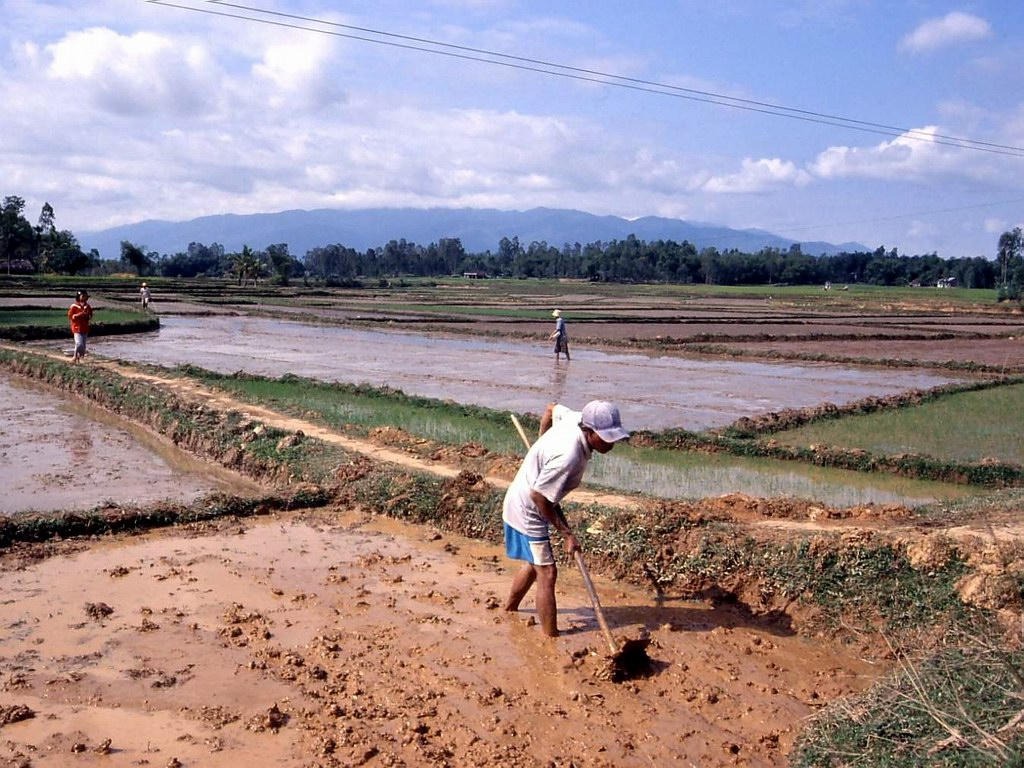
Paddy farmers, Rice Cultivation

Rice production in the Mekong delta has seen phenomenal increase in recent years, though in some years drought conditions have impeded this growth. This increase is attributed to planting of modern early maturing rice varieties, better management, appropriate legal constructs by the government. Forty two IRRI researched varieties of rice were released for adoption in the Mekong Delta and according to IRRI sources these varieties cover 60% of the irrigated rice-growing area in the delta. Area brought under rice paddy, which was at 4.744 million ha in 1961 increased to 7.305 million ha in 2007. Correspondingly, Rice production in Vietnam which was 8.997 million tonnes in 1961 and 10.29 million tonnes in 1975, gradually increased the next over two decades to 35.567 million tonnes in 2007 – an almost fourfold increase in a period of 46 years from 1961 to 2007.

== International cooperation ==
The International Rice Research Institute (IRRI), which is headquartered in the Philippines, has played a very significant role in enhancing the knowledge base of rice farming in Vietnam. Their research efforts have been continually aimed at growing rice faster with higher yields. This has boosted the confidence level of the Vietnamese scientists who hope that their country would one day be the rice producer to feed the world. The IRRI has trained and worked with Vietnamese scientists since 1970. The scientists trained by IRRI now hold key positions in rice research institutions and universities and government organizations; some of the key institutions involved in rice research specific to Vietnam under the Ministry of Agriculture and Food Industry, Vietnam are: The Cuu Long Delta Rice Research Institute, Institute for Food Crop Research, Institute for Soils and Fertilizers, Institute for Science and Technology, Vietnam Agricultural Sciences and Technology Institute, Southern Institute for Food Crops, Vietnam Agricultural Sciences and Technology Institute and the University of Agriculture and Forestry. In May 1994, the contribution of the IRRI to Rice development in Vietnam was recognized by the President of the Socialist Republic of Vietnam with a Friendship Order of the Vietnam Government with the citation, "in recognition of the Institute's "very efficient contribution".

Apart from introducing several rice varieties of IRR in Vietnam, other assistance provided by the Institute relate to the involvement in the irrigated rice ecosystem to increase their production and income through several measures such as; creating a communication among farmers through a network of pest management on concepts such as "no early insecticide spray" policy as a standard practice in rice production, integrated nutrient management measures, improved water management and financial support from the Australian Government, strengthening the Cuu Long Delta Rice Research Institute with UNDP assistance, and also several research projects undertaken jointly by the IRRI with institutions in Vietnam on hybrid rice, insect infestation, potassium deficiencies in soils affecting yields and rice based farm research.

Research studies have indicated that reclamation of coastal wetlands for growing rice in the tidal zones need to be taken up carefully after assessing the suitability of the soil conditions for levels of salinity and sulfate acids.

== Rice varieties ==
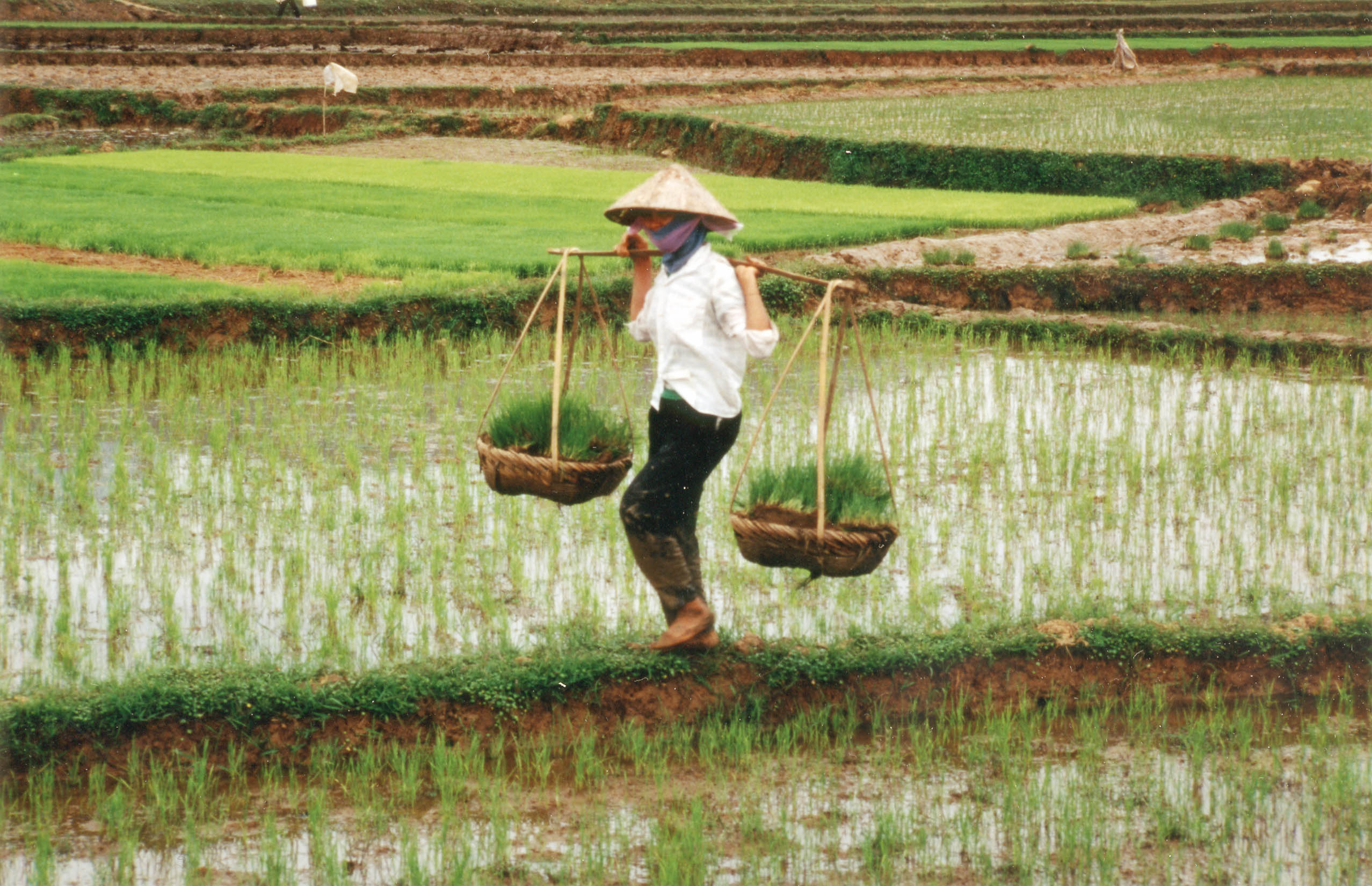
A Farmer in Vietnam

Modern mechanized farming methods and new strains of rice are becoming popular. There are more than 1600 varieties grown in the Mekong Delta.

As rice farming becomes more mechanized, traditional wooden farm tools as well as older strains of rice are also preserved. Among the 1,600-plus varieties of rice grown in the delta, a unique variety is the "floating" rice — its several-foot-long stems keep it above rising floodwaters. However, old rice varieties have their special place. According to an expert in Vietnamese rice-growing regions:

Old rice varieties still have strong characteristic...They can grow in acid sulfate and saline soil and submerged areas. They are tasty and have a popular flavour that should be preserved for cross breeding.

== Cuisine ==
Rice is the staple diet of Vietnam. It is often said that in Vietnam, all three meals in a day consists of "rice and something else.". The French then brought their culinary specialties (particularly, salads and sautéing) when they colonised Vietnam. At a dining table in Vietnamese houses, rice is the main dish that is placed at the centre with other dishes arranged around it. The breakfast usually starts with a noodle soup, a rice gruel- the national dish pho – or it could be a "rice cake wrapped in a banana leaf", lunch is normally with rice vermicelli with something else (grilled meat or sea food) and dinner is also generally a repeat of the lunch dishes with rice as the central dish.

There are many types of rice in Vietnam. However, the most popular varieties are the usual white rice (eaten during every meal), jasmine rice (moist rice commonly used by the upper class), sweet or sticky rice known as xôi or glutinous rice (steamed rice sweetened and mixed with condiments eaten for breakfast or as a dessert dish) and broken rice, converted to Com Tam by steaming (common in restaurants); each has its own uniqueness.

== Bibliography ==
- lee, Brian (1994). IRRI 1993-1994: filling the world's rice bowl. International Rice Research Institute. ISBN 971-22-0061-2.
- Ray, Nick; Yu-Mei Balasingamchow; Stewart, Iain (2009). Vietnam. Lonely Planet. ISBN 978-1-74179-159-4.
- Sterling, Richard (2000). Vietnam. Lonely Planet. ISBN 1-86450-028-X.
