= Monty Jones =

Sierra Leonean plant breeder (1951–2024)

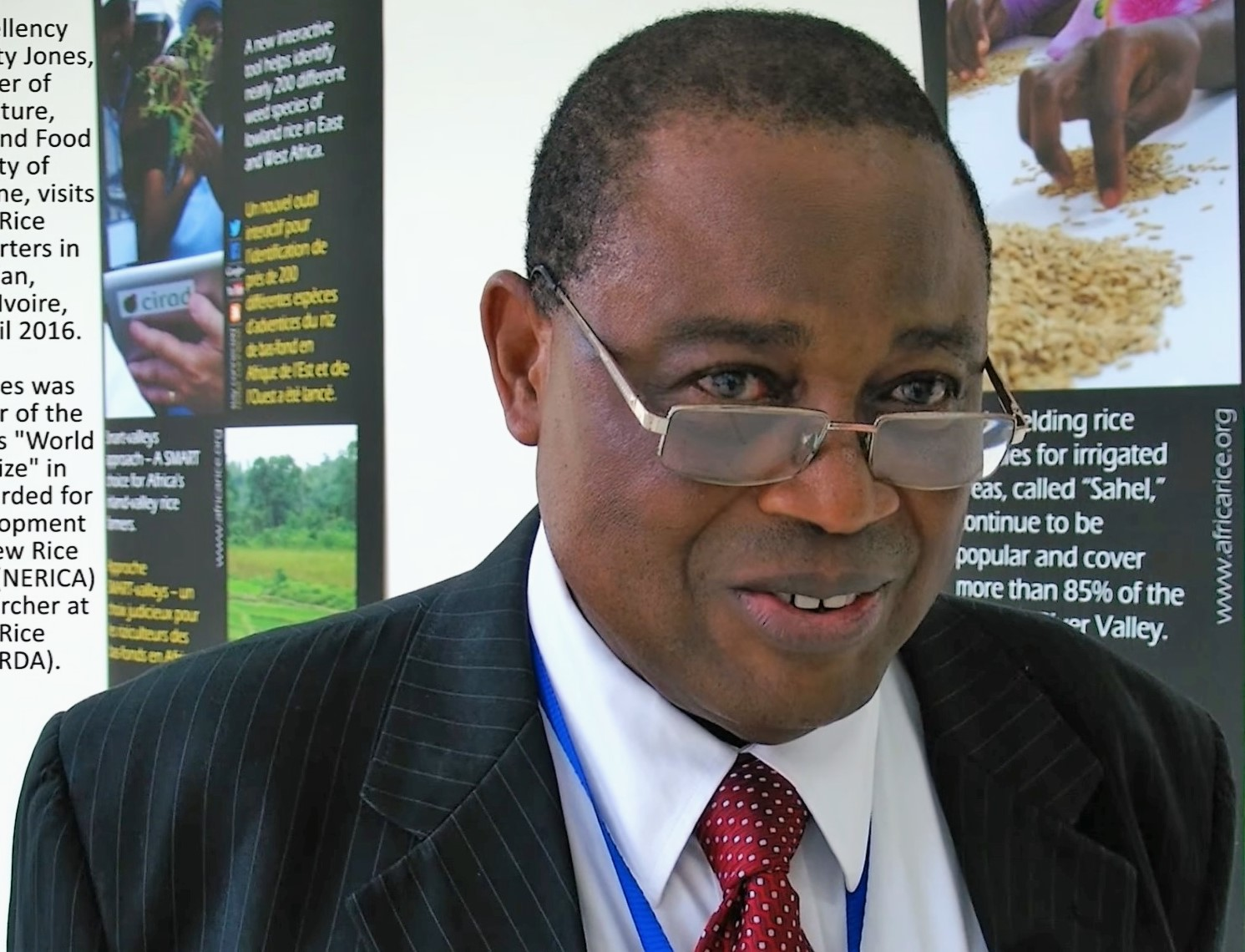
- Jones at the Africa Rice Center in 2016
- Born: 5 February 1951; Freetown, Sierra Leone Colony and Protectorate
- Died: 28 April 2024 (aged 73)
- Education: B.Sc. in Agriculture Njala University College, University of Sierra Leone (1974) M.Sc. in Plant Genetic Resources, University of Birmingham, UK (1979) Ph.D. in Plant Biology, University of Birmingham (1983)
- Known for: Plant breeding

Monty Jones (5 February 1951 – 28 April 2024) was a Sierra Leonean plant breeder and politician who served as the Minister of Agriculture, Forestry and Food Security.

Jones served as the Special Adviser to the President of Sierra Leone and Ambassador-at-Large until his appointment to the cabinet.

He served as the first Executive Director of the Forum for Agricultural Research in Africa (FARA) and was adjudged a co-winner of the 2004 World Food Prize.

The award was based on his discovery of the genetic process to create the New Rice for Africa (NERICA), which gives higher yields, shorter growth cycles and more protein content than its Asian and African parents.

== Biography ==
Born Monty Patrick Jones on 5 February 1951, in Freetown, Sierra Leone, Jones was raised in a middle-class Creole Catholic family.

Jones obtained a B.Sc. in Agriculture from Njala University College, University of Sierra Leone in 1974, followed by an M.Sc. in Plant Genetic Resources (1979) and a Ph.D. in Plant Biology (1983) from the University of Birmingham, UK.

He was also awarded an honorary degree in Doctor of Science (DSc) by his alma mater, Birmingham University, in July 2005.

Jones died on 28 April 2024, at the age of 73.

== Career ==
Jones spent the last 32 years of his career in Africa working in international agricultural research for development institutions. He began his career at the Rice Research Station in Sierra Leone, where he worked as a breeder for 13 years.

His international career started with the CGIAR as coordinator of the IITA/USAID Cameroon rice program from 1987 to 1990. In 1991, Jones moved to the West Africa Rice Development Association (WARDA) now known as AfricaRice Centre, to become its principal breeder.

There, he led the team that successfully crossed the Asian and African rice species (Oryza sativa and Oryza glaberrima), producing the high-yield NERICA variety in collaboration with his fellow African scientists and with other scientists from Asia, Europe and the US. He then disseminated NERICA through participatory approaches by working at multiple levels of associates from scientists to extension workers and farmersorganizations to governments and NGOs.

Jones’ work on NERICA has increased rice production in Africa and has given savings to many African governments on rice imports. Through his work, WARDA was awarded the CGIAR’s King Baudouin Award in 2000.

At the time he left WARDA to join FARA in July 2002, Jones had held three offices, first as its Principal Rice Breeder, Rain-fed Program Leader and Deputy Director of Research.

Upon joining FARA as its Executive Secretary (later renamed Executive Director), Jones was actively involved in creating awareness to ensure coordinated efforts in agricultural research for development and increased African ownership in the area of research.

He is the immediate past chairperson of Global Forum on Agricultural Research (GFAR).

In January 2014 Jones was nominated president of EMRC, a not-for-profit Belgium-based association founded to encourage and facilitate private sector investment in Africa.

Jones replaced Professor Pierre Mathijsen, professor of European Law at the University of Brussels and Managing Partner of the law firm Eurolegal EEIG, who had been at the helm of EMRC for a decade.

== Awards and recognition ==
1. September 2001, Jones received the National Order of Merit of Côte d'Ivoire given by the Ivorian President.
2. 2004, Jones was named a co-recipient (with Prof. Yuan Longping of China) of the World Food Prize for his work in developing NERICA.
3. 2007, Time Magazine named him one of the 100 most influential people in the world.
4. 2010, he was appointed Professor Extraordinary by the Executive Committee of the University of the Free State, South Africa.
5. 2010, he was also awarded the main prize of the Niigata International Food Award in Japan, in October of the same year.
6. 2011, he was awarded the Insignia of the Grand Officer of the Order of the Rokel by the President of Sierra Leone for his work on NERICA.

Honorary titles
Preceded by Catherine Bertini	World Food Prize; 2004	Succeeded by Modadugu Vijay Gupta
