= Global Rice Science Partnership =

The Global Rice Science Partnership (GRiSP), also known as the CGIAR Research Program on Rice, is an initiative of the CGIAR to bring together research and development partners from around the world to undertake and deliver rice research. Launched in November 2010, GRiSP aims to "dramatically improve the ability of rice farmers to feed growing populations in some of the world's poorest nations".

France, through the Centre de Coopération Internationale en Recherche Agronomique pour le Développement (CIRAD) and L'Institut de Recherche pour le Développement (IRD), as well as Japan through the Japan International Research Centre for Agricultural Sciences (JIRCAS), were critical establishing partners. GRiSP now claims to have more than 900 partners worldwide from the public and private sector. Most recently, Singapore announced financial support for international rice research positioning itself as an important GRiSP partner.

GRiSP is being led in Asia by the International Rice Research Institute (IRRI), in Africa by the Africa Rice Center (AfricaRice), and in Latin America by the International Center for Tropical Agriculture (CIAT).

== 2012 update ==
Bas Bouman was announced as the new Director for GRiSP, effective from 1 September 2012, and replacing Achim Dobermann.

== 2011 update ==
In August 2011, a yield potential workshop was held at CIAT in Colombia. Scientists explored the importance of steady and incremental yield gains in Latin America, but delivering this through modern rice breeding techniques.

In September 2011, the AfricaRice hosted the GRiSP Africa Science Forum. AfricaRice Deputy Director General and Director of Research for Development Marco Wopereis said that there was an increasing shift to a more demand/market-driven research in Africa.

In October 2011, IRRI hosted the 2011 GRiSP Asia Review and Global Forum where GRiSP Director and IRRI Deputy Director General for Research Achim Dobermann said that there was substantial progress across GRiSP's themes in Asia during 2011, highlighting the global gene discovery work. The promise of new varieties resistant to multiple abiotic stresses such as flooding and salinity, better water and pest management strategies, the identification of the genetic information that makes rice chalky, the impact of IRRI's rice breeding work across Southeast Asia, and the launch of a mobile phone service to help farmers get site-specific nutrient management advice.
