= Africa Rice Center =

Pan-African intergovernmental association

Coordinates: 6°25′15″N 2°19′35″E

- Abbreviation: AfricaRice
- Formation: 1971
- Type: Non-profit research and training center
- Purpose: Research
- Headquarters: Abidjan,
- Location: Côte d'Ivoire
- Region served: Africa
- Members: 28 members: Benin; Burkina Faso; Cameroon; Central African Republic; Chad; Ivory Coast; Democratic Republic of the Congo; Egypt; Ethiopia; Gabon; The Gambia; Ghana; Guinea; Guinea-Bissau; Kenya; Liberia; Madagascar; Mali; Mauritania; Mozambique; Niger; Nigeria; Republic of the Congo; Rwanda; Senegal; Sierra Leone; Togo; Uganda
- Official language: English / French
- Director General: Harold Roy-Macauley
- Main organ: Board of Trustees
- Affiliations: CGIAR
- Staff: 250
- Website: www.africarice.org

The Africa Rice Center (AfricaRice), formerly known as the West Africa Rice Development Association (WARDA), is a pan-African intergovernmental association and a CGIAR Research organization, currently headquartered in Abidjan, Côte d'Ivoire. AfricaRice is an agricultural research center that was constituted in 1971 by 11 West African countries. By 2023, the center counted 28 African member states. Since 1986, AfricaRice has been one of the 15 specialized research centers of CGIAR.

The center runs regional research stations in Saint-Louis, Senegal and Ibadan, Nigeria with country offices in Cotonou, Benin and Antananarivo, Madagascar.

AfricaRice aims to contribute to poverty alleviation and food security in Africa through research for development. The center has close links to agricultural research organizations in the African member states, agricultural universities and research institutes in Europe, Japan, the United States, and the development sector, including non-governmental organizations, farmers organizations, and donors. AfricaRice, being part of the CGIAR system, shares resources with several of the other CGIAR organizations, including the International Rice Research Institute (IRRI) in Los Baños, Philippines, and the International Institute of Tropical Agriculture in Ibadan, Nigeria. In the course of reforms at the CGIAR, AfricaRice developed together with IRRI and International Center for Tropical Agriculture (CIAT) the Global Rice Science Partnership (GRiSP), which sets a global strategic research agenda for rice.

One of AfricaRice's major tasks is developing and introducing new rice seed varieties suitable for African conditions. NERICA, which stands for "New Rice for Africa", is two families of interspecific cultivars of African (Oryza glaberrima) and Asian (Oryza sativa) rice species, that was developed to improve the yields of African farmers. For his work on NERICA, Monty Jones from Sierra Leone was awarded the World Food Prize in 2004, becoming the first African to win this award.

== Gallery ==
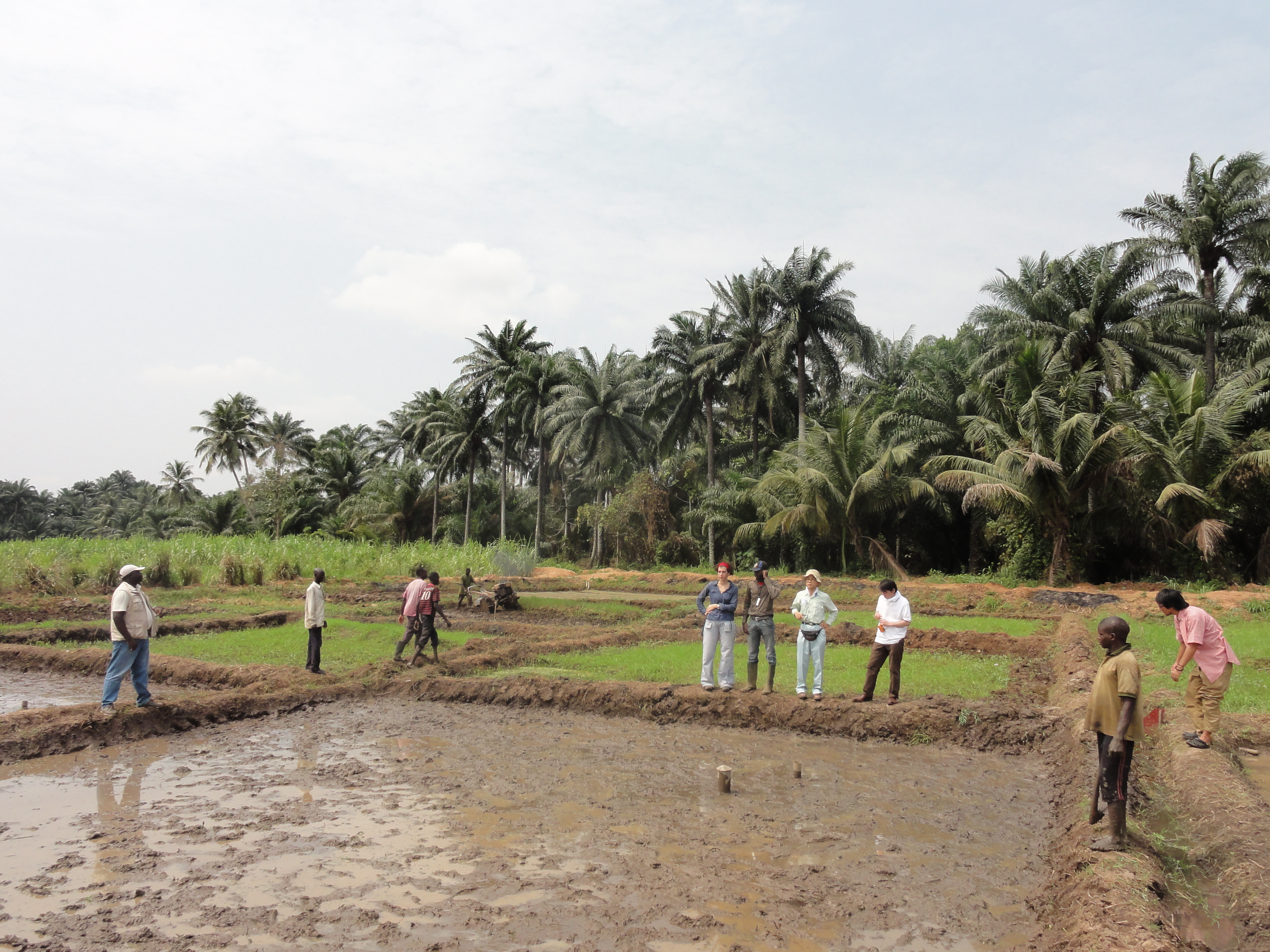
Africa Rice Center staff in Benin, 2011

== See also ==
- African rice
