= European Marketing Research Centre =

EMRC
- Trade name: EMRC
- Company type: Legal Person – Belgium
- Industry: Business Consultancy
- Founded: 8 April 1992
- Headquarters: Avenue Louise 287 Bruxelles, Belgium
- Area served: Worldwide
- Key people: Monty Jones (President); Idit Miller (Managing Director)
- Products: Research, Consultancy, Events,
- Number of employees: 10
- Website: www.emrc.be

European Marketing Research Centre (EMRC) (is a not-for-profit international association, founded in 1992 in Brussels, Belgium. The organization exists to encourage and facilitate private sector investment in Africa to create sustainable economic development and drive regional change through international partnerships. EMRC is a collective network of entrepreneurs, financiers, consultants and officials based throughout the world. The organization’s strategic focus is to support economic development in Africa through partnership between African entrepreneurs and ventures and international corporations, and financial services firms. EMRC also supports intercontinental collaboration between African ventures.

EMRC aims to unlock the potential of Africa’s agribusiness sector to help alleviate local poverty and to address supply constraints associated with global food demand. EMRC also operates in other natural resources sectors in Africa.

Its events include the AgriBusiness Forum (ABF) and the Africa Finance & Investment Forum (AFIF), which are annual events with the ABF being held on the African continent and AFIF taking place in Europe. The organization also conducts regular trade missions, with early missions taking in Israel and India.

In January 2014 Monty Jones was nominated president of EMRC. Jones replaced Professor Pierre Mathijsen, professor of European Law at the University of Brussels and managing partner of the law firm Eurolegal EEIG, who had been at the helm of EMRC for a decade.

== AgriBusiness Forum ==
The AgriBusiness Forum was launched in 2000 and initially held in a number of European cities before EMRC decided to move the forum permanently to the African continent. The most recent of the ABF was held in Kigali, Rwanda between 6 and 9 October 2013 in partnership with the Ministry of Agriculture & Animal Resources, Government of Rwanda and Rabobank a Dutch multinational banking and financial services company and the Food and Agriculture Organization of the United Nations. The forum attracts 400 to 500 agribusiness leaders and decision makers including private entities, development finance agencies, commercial banks, donors, industrialists, SMEs, researchers, government officials, international organisations, NGOs, and others from all over the world with a strong African presence.

The 2013 edition included a section on how African agriculturalists can use information and communications technology to open up new international markets. Previous versions have included Dakar, Senegal (2012), Johannesburg, South Africa (2011), Kampala, Uganda (2010), and Cape Town, South Africa. The forum encourages the adoption of new technologies and techniques to improve productivity and food security. It also helps agriculturalists in Africa find external investment to finance their projects.

== Africa Finance & Investment Forum ==
The Africa Finance & investment Forum is an annual seminar that was first held in 2003 that brings together entrepreneurs looking for partnerships and capital for growth and development and government and NGO officials, development finance agencies, commercial banks and private investors looking for fungible projects in agriculture and resources in Africa. AFIF aims to increase the flow of financial and technical support to the private sector in Africa by identifying the main impediments to a better developed trade in Africa. In the last edition, held in Cologne, Germany on 4–5 June and hosted by German Investment Corporation, AFIF focused on the issue of improving access to finance, by helping medium-sized companies prepare themselves to approach international financial markets and to the development of sustainable agribusiness in Africa. EMRC has also held AFIF in Geneva, Switzerland (2013), Utrecht, in the Netherlands (2012), Lisbon, Portugal (2011), and Amsterdam, the Netherlands (2009).

== Incubator Award ==
The Project Incubator Award was established by EMRC and Rabobank Foundation in 2008 to encourage innovation and entrepreneurship in Africa among small and medium enterprises (SME). The award presents U$15,000 to the entry that best illustrates innovation, sustainability and entrepreneurship in the African SME space. The winner is selected by a panel of independent development specialists. Past winners include Sophavet (2011) from Burkina Faso, Bee Natural (2010) from Uganda, Derekorp (2009) from Uganda, Coopérative Générale de Sepingo (2008) from Côte d'Ivoire and MUPECI (2008) from Cameroon.

== Economic Missions ==
EMRC has also conducted economic missions to India and Israel to help African entrepreneurs meet potential investors.

== External sources ==
- Official website
