= New Rice for Africa =

Group of hybrid rice

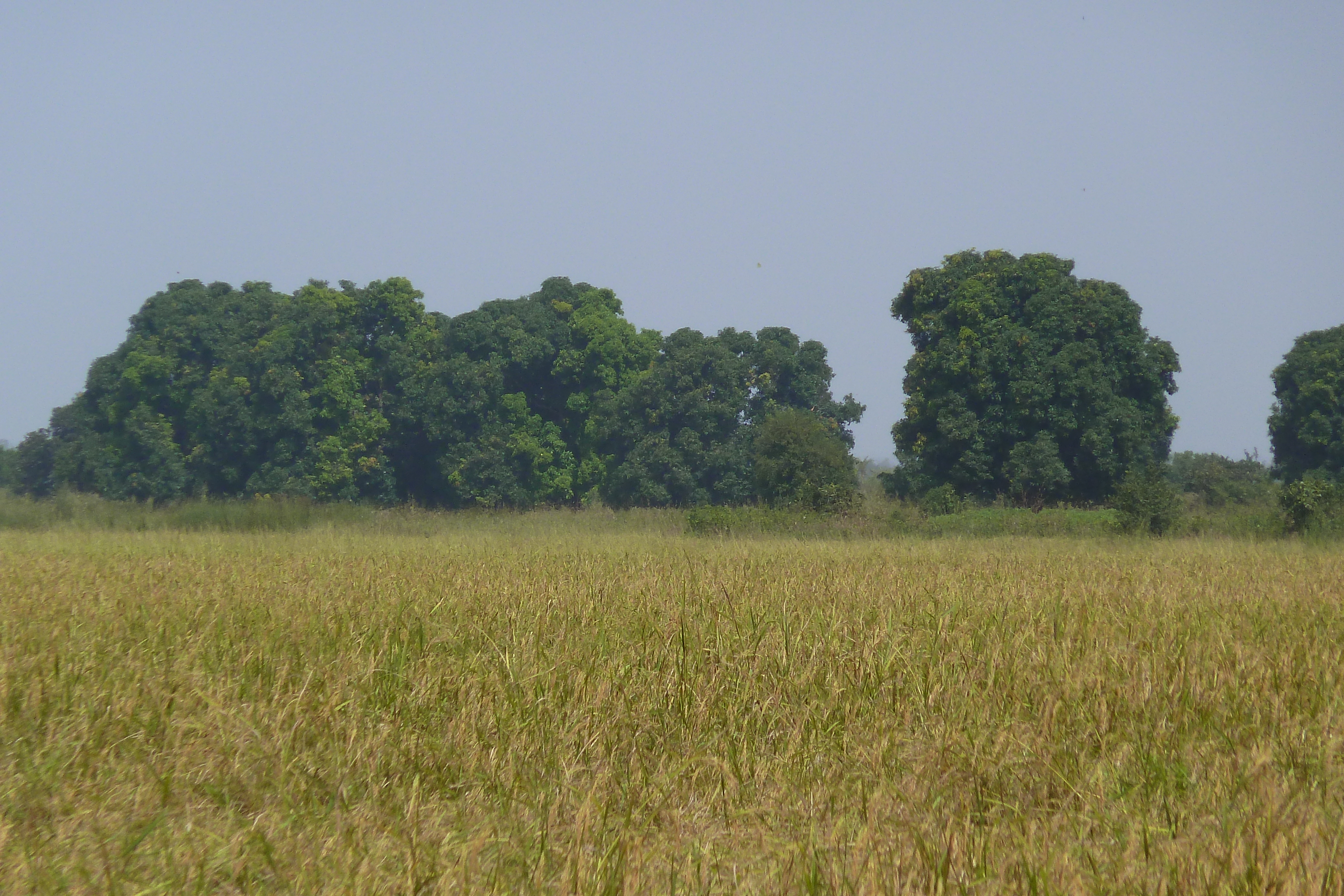
- A field of NERICA rice in Mali
- Hybrid parentage: O. sativa (recurrent) × O. glaberrima (donor)
- Cultivar group: NERICA

New Rice for Africa (NERICA) is a cultivar group of interspecific hybrid rice developed by the Africa Rice Center to improve the yield of African rice cultivars. Although 240 million people in West Africa rely on rice as the primary source of food energy and protein in their diet, around 40 percent of it is imported. Self-sufficiency in rice production would improve food security and aid economic development in West Africa.

Beginning in 1992 and receiving extra impetus after the 2007–2008 world food price crisis, NERICA is available in three main variety "groups": upland, rainfed lowland, and irrigated lowland. There are 18 upland varieties, 60 rainfed lowland varieties, and 4 irrigated lowland varieties. Most cultivars of NERICA are genetically more than 80% O. sativa (Asian rice), with the African rice O. glaberrima genes providing just the necessary traits for adapting to the African climate.

== Background ==
African rice Oryza glaberrima has been cultivated for 3,500 years and is well adapted to the African environment, but because of relatively low yield its cultivation has to a great extent been abandoned in favor of the import of (Asian) rice. The 2007–2008 world food price crisis provided an impetus for African countries and institutions to look to expand the growth of African rice varieties and become less dependent on imports.

=== NERICA ===
The NERICA Project, run by the Africa Rice Center, dates back to 1992, when Monty Jones began working on types of rice that "combine the high yield potential of Asian rice with the local adaptation of African rice", with the first developed in 1994. For his leadership in developing NERICA, Monty Jones was named a co-recipient of the 2004 World Food Prize.

It is funded by the African Development Bank, the Japanese government, and the United Nations Development Programme, and preliminary data were presented at the Fourth Tokyo International Conference on African Development (TICAD-IV) in 2008. The new rice varieties, which are suited to drylands, were distributed and sown on more than 200,000 hectares during the last five years in several African countries. Despite these developments, in 2008 the yields were projected to fall short of meeting the growing demand for rice as a food staple.

== New rice for Africa ==
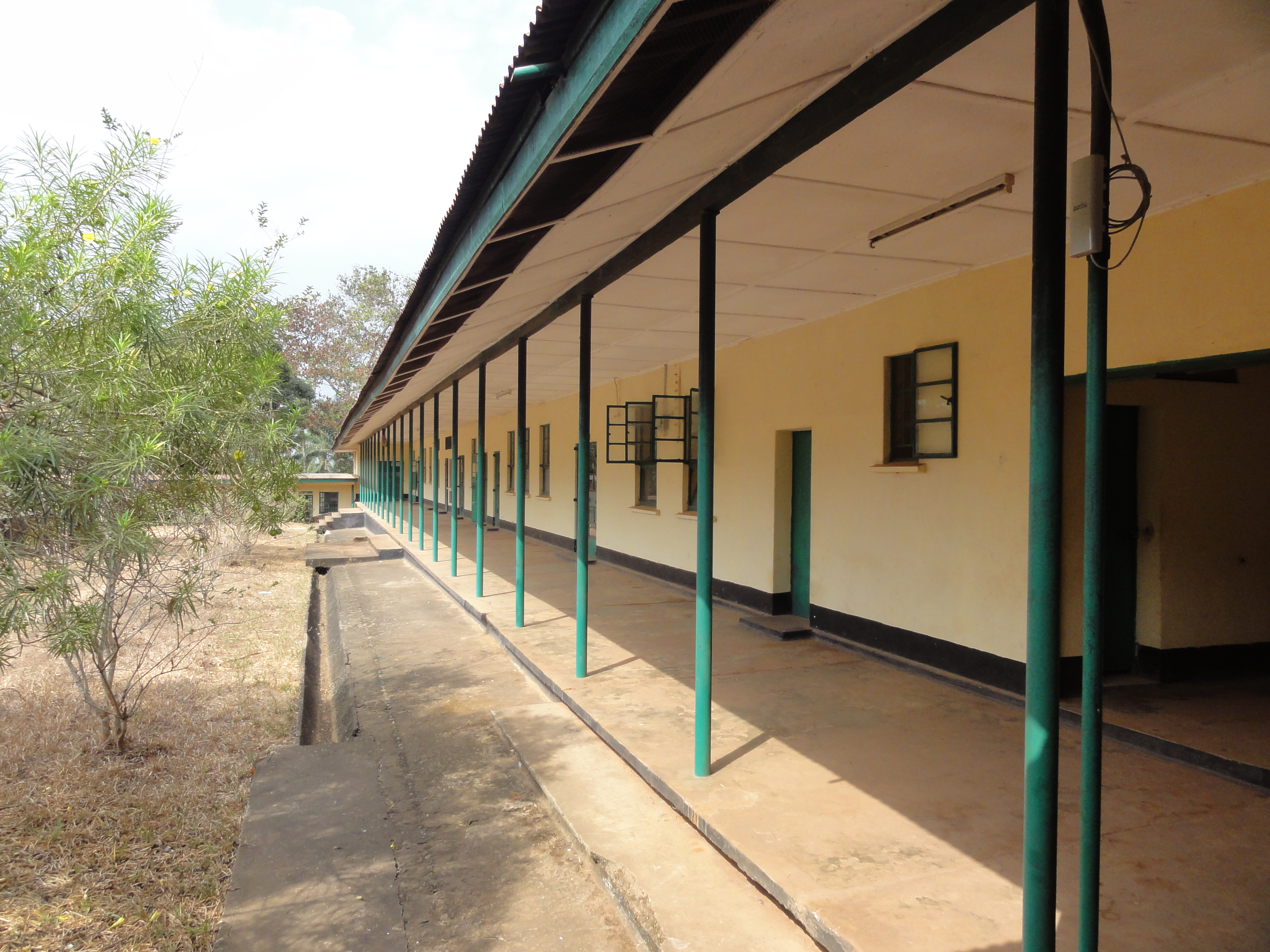
Rice research station in Rokupr, Sierra Leone

The new rice for Africa was created by crossing O. glaberrima and O. sativa. Because the different species do not naturally interbreed, a plant tissue culture technique called embryo-rescue was used to assure that crosses between the two varieties survive and grow to maturity. The new rice cultivars display heterosis, or hybrid vigor, the phenomenon in which the progeny of two genetically different parents grow faster, yield more, or resist stresses better than either parent. Backcrossing was used to arrive at a good plant that combines the high-yielding traits of the Asian rice with the hardy traits of the African rice.

Key features of the new varieties include:

- An increase in grain head size from 75-100 grains per head to 400 grains per head.
- An increase in yield from 1 tonne per hectare to 2.5 tonnes per hectare, yield increases to 5 tonnes per hectare with fertilizer use.
- Contains 2% more protein than their African or Asian parents.
- They are taller than most rices, which makes harvesting easier.
- They resist pests, and they tolerate drought and infertile soils better than Asian varieties.

Some NERICA lines show high growth with low uptake of water and seem to be appropriate for long periods of cultivation in drought condition.

== Uganda ==
Upland varieties of NERICA were introduced in Uganda in 2003, as part of a strategy to eradicate poverty. Its high yield, short maturity, and resistance to drought were thought to make it worth growing throughout the country. A study published in 2012 found that half of the farmers who started growing NERICA in 2004 were no longer growing it in 2006; this high dropout rate was thought to be caused by factors including a lack of credit and agency support for farmers, the newness of rice as a crop in the country, and a lack of good seeds. However, the study also suggested that family income among NERICA adopters had been boosted.

== See also ==
- System of Rice Intensification
