= Upland rice =

Rice grown in dry fields

Upland rice (also called dry rice) is rice grown in dry-land environments. The term describes varieties of rice developed for rain-fed or less-intensely irrigated soil instead of flooded rice paddy fields or rice grown outside of paddies.

== Introduction ==
The term “upland rice” refers to rice cultivated in non-flooded conditions, and it can encompass various specific definitions. While most of the world's rice is grown in paddy fields or wet environments that require significant amount of water, rice itself does not inherently need flooding to thrive. However, flooded fields help ensure the ample water supply that certain rice varieties require and assist in weed suppression. Upland rice, by contrast, is primarily rain-fed or lightly irrigated and is not reliant on flooded conditions. This category includes both specially bred varieties that are drought-tolerant and traditional rice varieties that have adapted to drier environments.

Nearly 100 million people depend on upland rice as their daily staple food. Almost two-thirds of the upland rice cultivation occurs in Asia, with Bangladesh, Cambodia, China, Northeastern India, Indonesia, Myanmar, Nepal, Thailand, and Vietnam all being important producers.

Ecosystems involving upland rice are often relatively diverse, including fields that are level, gently rolling, or steep. Such ecosystems also occur at altitudes up to 2,000 m, with average annual rainfall ranging between 1,000 mm to 4,500 mm.

Soils used to grow upland rice range from highly fertile to highly weathered, infertile, and acidic soil. However, only 15% of total upland rice grows where soils are fertile, and the growing season is long.

Many upland farmers plant local rice that does not respond well to improved management practices, like intensive farming using artificial fertilizers, but these local rice varieties are well adapted to their environments and produce grains that meet local needs.

Although the rice technology of the 1960s and 1970s focused on irrigated rice, research also studied the cultivation of upland rice. Researchers produced cultivars adapted to poor soils with improved pest resistance and drought tolerance. Some have out-yielded traditional rice by over 100 percent in evaluations. Scientists at national agricultural research systems have crossed these improved strains with local cultivars, introducing hybrid varieties of rice.

== Challenges to upland rice farming ==
New challenges, in recent years are experienced in the world's upland rice-farming areas, where poverty is already a widespread problem. These farmers try to make a living by farming on poor-quality soil, which makes it hard to grow their crops.

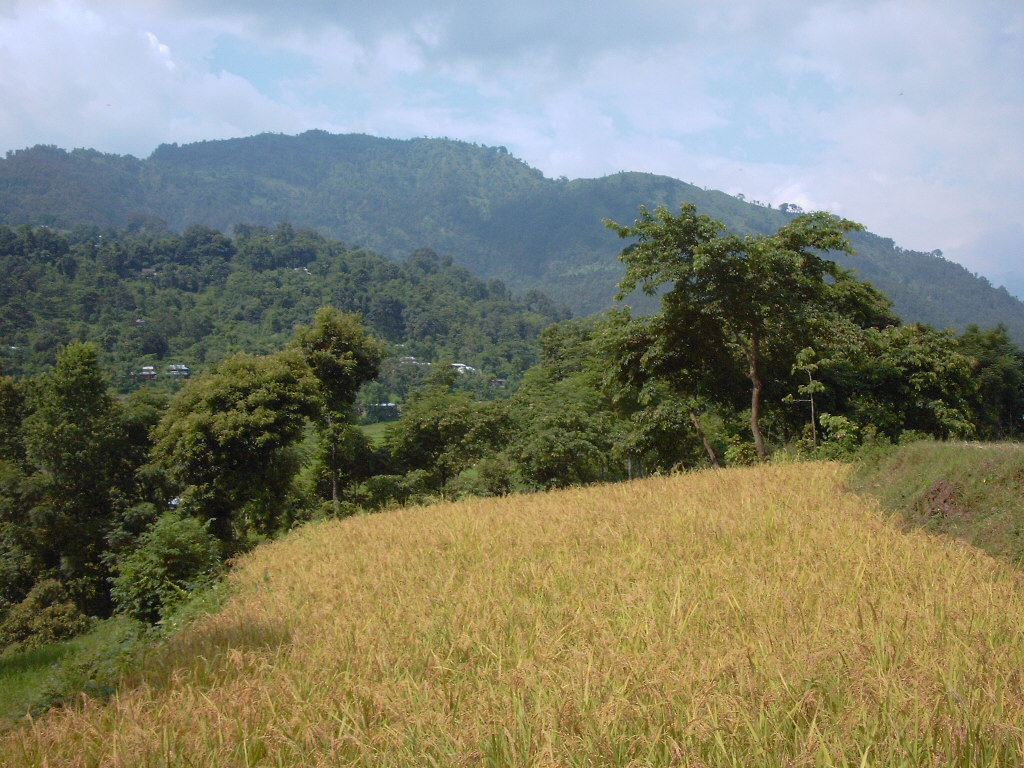
Upland rice field near Sundar Bazaar Lamjung, Nepal

Population growth, the demands of urbanism and industry, and the increasing adoption of high-value cash crop farming in the surrounding lowlands are leading to strong competition for upland terrain.

The uplands have always suffered from drought, infertile soils, weeds, and plant diseases. The soils there have been severely eroded and degraded as a result of the slash-and-burn agriculture that followed logging for many years. This destroys the watershed, producing problems in the lands below.

These new upward pressures result in a movement toward permanent agriculture and an intensification of land use in upland areas. In addition to the usual upland problems, those involved in growing upland rice find themselves facing an urgent need to conserve soil and the diversity of plant species and to deal with increasingly frequent and severe weed and disease infestations.

== Blast fungus ==
Recently, scientists have been improving their knowledge of the genetics of resistance to the blast fungus, one of the most damaging diseases of rice. Using the techniques of biotechnology, they are developing cultivars with more durable disease resistance.

In the uplands, the blast is particularly important because the environment favors its proliferation. Although many traditional upland cultivars show stable resistance to this disease under low-input cropping practices, they have other characteristics that make them difficult to use in intensified systems. So, the risk of blast increases as cropping practices intensify and improved varieties are introduced.

Scientists from the International Rice Research Institute (IRRI) have been working with colleagues in the Upland Rice Research Consortium to better understand pathogen populations and identify resistance genes found in some cultivars. Armed with this knowledge, they are working with IRRI's upland rice breeder to combine such genes with other desirable traits for incorporation into new upland varieties.

Consortium scientists are also trying to understand how upland rice farmers' cropping systems contribute to soil erosion, with the aim of proposing possible erosion control techniques. Studies in the Philippines have shown that hedgerows of trees, shrubs, and grasses along hill contours can help reduce soil erosion by up to 90 percent. Rice or other crops are planted between these strips of permanent ground cover.

Leguminous plants in hedgerows make substantial amounts of atmospheric nitrogen available to both rice plants and annual crops and recycle other nutrients and organic matter.

Such legumes can simultaneously increase farmers' incomes and contribute to the sustainability of the farming system.

Drought stress tolerance screening using a chlorophyll meter

== The importance of weeds ==
Weeds are the most serious biological constraint to upland rice production. IRRI scientists are pursuing projects on managing weeds with less herbicide use. One approach is to search for rice plant species that exhibit a characteristic known as allelopathy. Allelopathic plants can affect the growth of nearby plants through the production of biological compounds they release into the environment. If allelopathic rice—or other plant species—could be found to inhibit the growth of weeds important in rice production, it might be possible through genetic engineering to develop rice cultivars that would provide their own weed control.

Most weed species are susceptible to certain diseases . The purposeful application of the agents of such diseases to weed pests among rice crops could constitute another approach to weed control.

Researchers from IRRI, Maejo University, and Chiang Mai University launched a study in 1993 of the interactions between weeds, crop environmental conditions, and farmers' practices in upper northern Thailand. The goals are to understand the diversity of farmers' practices and decision-making processes and to grade the factors that limit rice crop yields.

IRRI scientists are also studying how fertilizer and cultural practices influence weed communities. In one project on phosphorus management, they are investigating how weed communities change as soil fertility is improved over time in the Philippines, Indonesia, and Thailand.

Rice plant cultivars differ in their ability to compete with weeds in the field. Scientists in the Philippines tested the competitiveness of a dozen cultivars against weeds to help farmers choose the most highly competitive one. By planting this cultivar and enhancing their competitive ability through good management practices, farmers should be able to reduce the amount of hand weeding necessary while achieving maximum yields.

Difference in establishment A). drought tolerant variety Pakhejhinuwa vs B). drought sensitive Mansuli

== Improving soil fertility ==
Research on farms in Thailand, Laos and the Philippines confirmed that a lack of phosphorus in upland farms is a limiting factor in rice crop yields- arising from the fact that many highly weathered upland soils are inherently low in phosphorus and are acidic.

This lack of phosphorus will limit production even if calcium is added to the soil to overcome the acidity, or if acid-tolerant cultivars are planted. Rotations of rice and legumes could lead to stable, higher-value production if phosphorus is added and that soil quality does not degrade over time.

== Acid barrier ==
The acidity present in the subsoil of many upland areas prevents plant roots from reaching the moisture and nutrients therein, thus reducing crop yield. Adding lime to the subsoil is not practical, but in 1994, IRRI and Indonesian scientists began experiments to see if components of lime applied to the soil surface could be leached down into the subsoil. This is done by manipulating soil chemistry and using deep-rooted, acid-tolerant rice cultivars to help capture the leached components.

Scientists are currently studying the processes that govern the rate of leaching of lime components and their accumulation in the subsoil. Using this data, they plan to construct mathematical models that will be used to develop practical technologies and to indicate under what conditions the technologies might be effective.

The experiments began at the Upland Rice Research Consortium site in Sitiung, Indonesia. French collaborators from l'Institut francais de recherche scientifique pour le développement en cooperation are planning similar experiments in Thailand and Vietnam.

== Perennial upland rice ==
Rice, like most cereal crops, is an annual plant, which leads to soil erosion when grown as a monoculture. A perennial variety of rice that would not need to be replanted annually could help reduce erosion by providing a permanent ground cover and deeper, tighter root systems. Perenniality exists in several wild species of rice from Southeast Asia, but their yields are low. These species, however, can be crossed with cultivated rice through selection to develop both high-yield and perennial crops.

The challenge facing scientists is to produce a high-yielding perennial plant adapted to the poor soils of the uplands, with high yields from low-purchased inputs, and resistant to diseases and insects.

The development of high-yield, resilient, perennial rice varieties is an important focus at the International Rice Research Institute. Genomics allows the transfer of perennial genetic properties into traditional varieties of cultivated rice, and new knowledge of genetic diversity will be applied to develop pest resistance.

== Participatory crop improvement ==
Upland rice is being partially replaced by other crops, such as maize. On the other hand, the landraces are gradually disappearing from farmers' fields. Diversity of upland rice can be maintained while, at the same time, levels of production can be increased using participatory techniques. The addition of upland rice to fields allows for crop rotation and the improvement of diversity in fields.

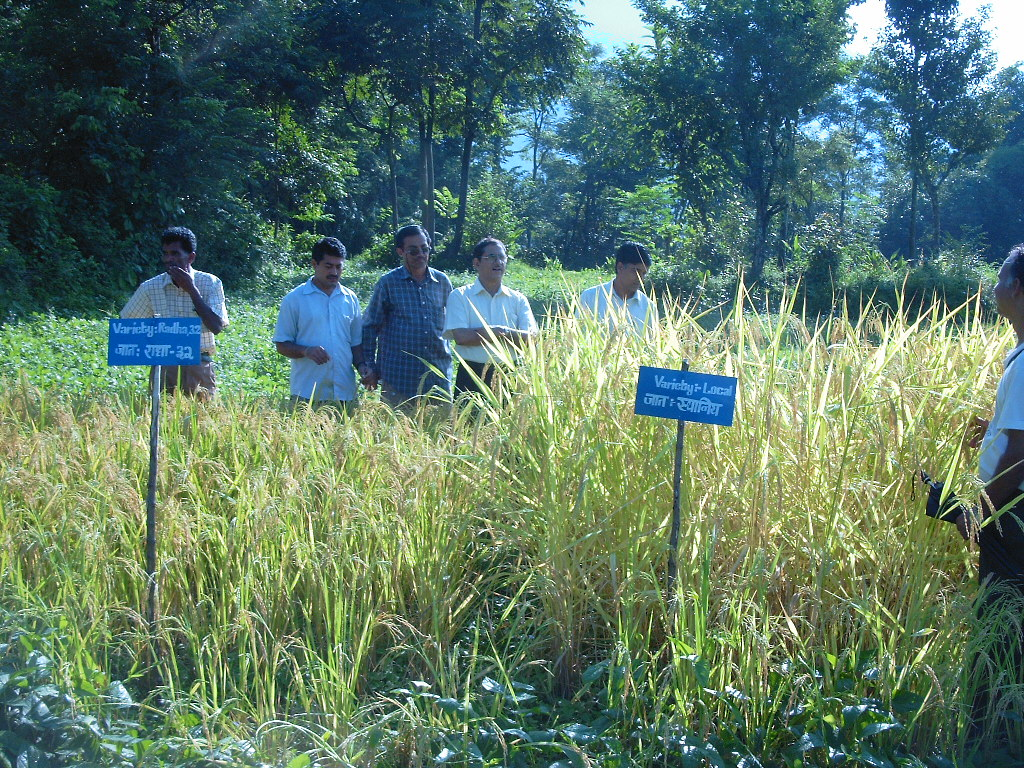
Farmer-managed participatory varietal selection trial at Sundarbazaar, Lamjung, Nepal

== See also ==
- Rice
- Blast fungus
- Deepwater rice
- International Rice Research Institute (IRRI)
- Wild rice

== Bibliography ==
- Arraudeau, M. A. Upland rice: Challenges and opportunities in a less favorable ecosystem. GeoJournal, March 1995, Volume 35, Issue 3, pp. 325–328.
- Jerome Bernier, Gary N Atlin, Rachid Serraj, Arvind Kumar and Dean Spaner. 2008. Review: Breeding upland rice for drought resistance. J Sci Food Agric 88:927–939
- Dhakal, D.D., D. Ghimire, B.B. Adhikari, U.R. Rosyara, H.B. Gurung, S. Pandey. 2006. Managing rice landscapes in marginal uplands for household food security and environmental protection- IAAS / IRRI collaborative project (Nepal Component). Report Submitted to International Fund for Agricultural Development.
- Subedi, S., U.R. Rosyara, B.B. Adhikari, B.R. Ojha, D.P. Ghimire. D.D. Dhakal, H.B. Gurung, and S. Pandey. 2011. Participatory Crop Improvement: Effect of Farmers’ Selection Criteria on Diversity of Rice Grown In Uplands of Nepal. Journal of Agriculture Science. Vol 49.
- Pinheiro B da S, Castro E da M de, Guimara˜es CM (2006) Sustainability and profitability of aerobic rice production in Brazil. Field Crops Res 97:34–42
- Alexandre Bryan Heinemann Æ Michael Dingkuhn Æ Delphine Luquet Æ Jean Claude Combres Æ Scott Chapman. 2008. Characterization of drought stress environments for upland rice and maize in central Brazil. Euphytica 162:395–410
- Singh, Chandra Vir; Ghosh, Bidhan Chandra; Mittra, Bishwa Nath; Singh, Rama Kant.2008. Influence of nitrogen and weed management on the productivity of upland rice. Journal of plant nutrition and soil science. vol. 171, no. 3, pp. 466–470
- Atlin GN, Laza M, Amante M and Lafitte HR, Agronomic performances of tropical aerobic, irrigated, and traditional upland rice varieties in three hydrological environments at IRRI, in New Directions for a Diverse Planet: Proceedings of the 4th International Crop Science Congress, ed. by Fisher T, Turner N, Angus J, McIntyre L, Robertson M, Borrell A, et al., Brisbane, Australia (2004).
- Atlin GN, Lafitte HR, Tao D, Laza M, Amante M and Courtois B, Developing rice cultivars for high-fertility upland systems in the Asian tropics. (2006).Field Crops Res 97:43–52
- Fisher AJ, Ramırez HV, Gibson KD and Da Silveira Pinheiro B,(2001). Competitiveness of semidwarf upland rice cultivars against palisadegrass (Bracharia brizantha) and signalgrass (B. decumbens). Agron J 93:967–973
- Pandey S., Behura D.D., Vilano R. and Naik D. Economic cost of drought and farmers’ coping mechanisms: a study of rainfed rice systems in Eastern India, in Discussion Paper Series. International Rice Research Institute, Makati City, Philippines, p. 35 (2000).
- Courtois B., McLaren G., Sinha P.K., Prasad K., Yadav R. and Shen L. Mapping QTL associated with drought avoidance in upland rice. (2000). Molecular Breeding, 2000, 6, pp. 55–66.
- Boonjung H and Fukai S, Effects of soil water deficit at different growth stages on rice growth and yield under upland conditions. 2. Phenology, biomass production and yield.(1996). Field Crops Res 48:47–55
- Kondo M, Pablico PP, Aragones DV, Agbisit R, Abe J, Morita S, et al., Genotypic and environmental variations in root morphology in rice genotypes under upland field conditions. Plant Soil 255:189–200 (2003).
- Passioura J, Increasing crop productivity when water is scarce: from breeding to field management. Agric Water Manage 80:176–196 (2006).
