= Cửu Long Delta Rice Research Institute =

Vietnamese governmental institution

The Mekong Delta Rice Research Institute (CLRRI, Vietnamese: Viện lúa Đồng bằng sông Cửu Long), situated in Cần Thơ, Vietnam, is a governmental institution dedicated to agricultural research. The institute was established in 1-1977 under name of Center for agricultural Technology in Cuulong delta. It renamed in 1985 on name of CLRRI
