= Deepwater rice =

Variety of rice

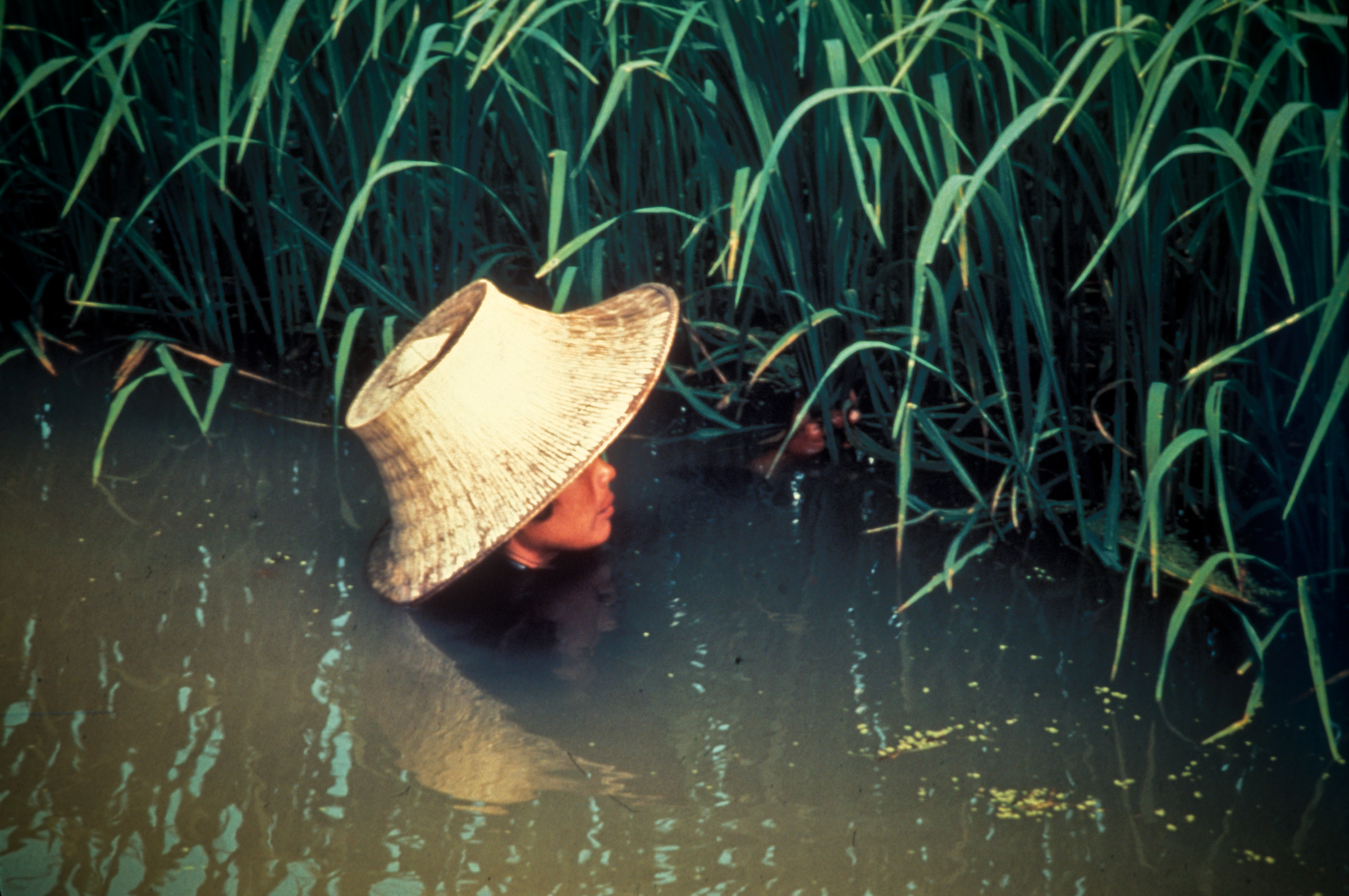
A farmer inspecting a crop of deepwater rice

Deepwater rice are varieties of rice (Oryza sativa) grown in flooded conditions with water more than 50 cm (20 in) deep for at least a month. More than 100 million people in Southeast Asia including Northeastern India rely on deepwater rice for their sustenance. Two adaptations permit the rice to thrive in deeper water, floating rice and traditional talls. Traditional talls are varieties that are grown at water depths between 50 and 100 cm (20 and 39 in) and have developed to be taller and have longer leaves than standard rice. Floating rice grows in water deeper than 100 cm through advanced elongation ability. This means when a field where rice is growing floods, accelerated growth in the internodal of the stem allows the plant to keep some of its foliage on top of the water. The O. s. indica cultivar is the main type of deepwater rice, although varieties of O. s. japonica have been found in Burma and Assam Plains.

== Production ==
Deepwater rice is a staple food grown on roughly 90,000 km^{2} (35,000 sq mi) of land. The main areas where it is grown are in Southeast Asia including Northeastern India, where more than 100 million people rely on its production for their livelihood. In South-East Asia, the main area deepwater rice is grown in the Brahmaputra valley in Assam, a state in Northeast India and other Northeast Indian states. In other regions of Mainland Southeast Asia, the main areas of cultivation are in Myanmar in the Irrawaddy Delta, in Thailand in the Chao Phraya and Mekong in Vietnam and Cambodia. In these countries, deepwater rice accounts for more than 25% of the land used to grow rice.

Deepwater rice is cultivated less in West Africa than in Asia, with about 4,700 km^{2} (1,800 sq mi). Areas it is grown include the Niger River basin. Some areas in Ecuador grow deepwater rice.

== Cultivation methods ==
Deepwater rice is grown in tropical monsoon climates normally around river deltas and their floodplains mainly in backswamps and natural levees. The nature of the flood is important for success of deepwater rice, with timing and the rate of rise of water affecting survival and crop density. Generally, the flood water comes from rainfall or rises in the water table. In places with low rainfall, water overspilling from rivers can flood rice-producing areas.

=== Issues ===
When seeds are sown directly into the soil, the seeds and young plants can be damaged by drought conditions before floods arrive. During this stage, the plants can also suffer due to competition from weeds. Sudden flooding, where a large volume of water enters the field in a short time, can lead to a high level of seedling death.

Floating rice faces additional problems due to the depth and time of the water in which it grows. Water conditions such as turbulence and temperature can adversely affect the crop.

Natural disasters can also damage or destroy deepwater rice crops. Tropical cyclones are particularly a problem in Asia. For example, in 2008, Cyclone Nargis damaged 122,782 hectares of deepwater rice in Burma. If predicted sea level rises due to climate change happen, this would affect the pattern of flooding, causing deeper floods over a wider area and eroding the coast.

Deepwater rice emits the least methane, a greenhouse gas, of the wetland rice ecologies, producing approximately one third of emissions compared to paddy field rice.

=== Floating rice adaptation ===
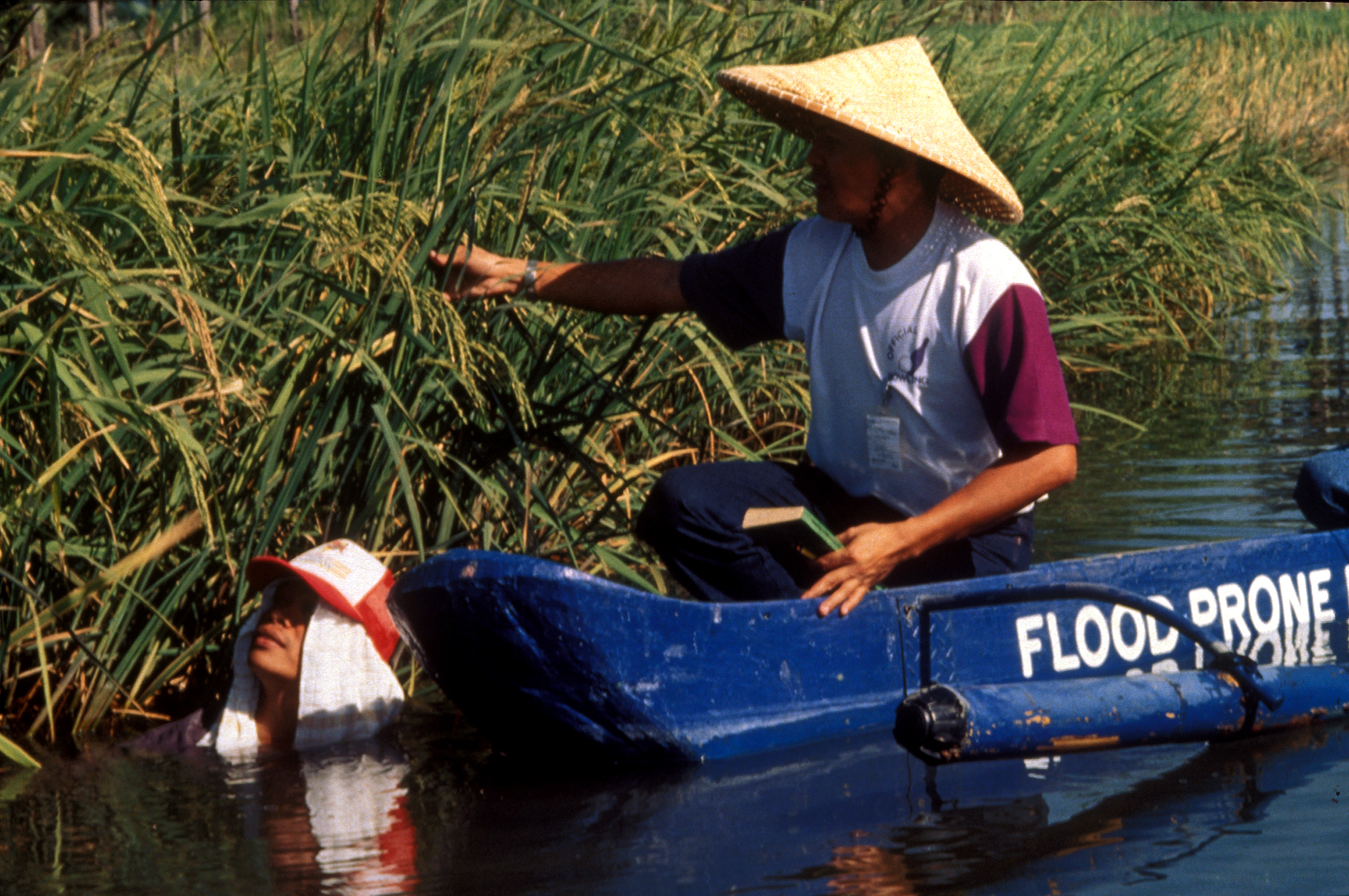
Researchers checking on floating rice

Floating rice is planted in dry ground and allowed to establish as young plants. The area becomes flooded which triggers the rice's elongation ability. This means when a field where rice is growing floods, accelerated growth in the internodes of the stem allows the plant to keep some of its foliage on top of the water. The stems are hollow and this allows gas to be exchanged between the plant and the atmosphere. Once the flooding ends, the plant is left lying on the ground. The nodes at the top of the plant then start growing upwards towards due to gravitropic sensitivity.

The elongation is triggered when the plant is submerged through a mechanism involving ethylene gas. Ethylene is normally produced by plants and diffused into the air, but when floating rice is submerged in water, this process is disrupted as the gas moves more slowly into water. This leads to a buildup of ethylene in the plant. This triggers the production of a hormone called gibberellin which causes the rapid growth in the plant. When the plant reaches the surface, the ethylene gas can escape as normal and the rapid growth stops. Research continues to enhance the ability to cope with increasing water depth. Rice will drown if submerged for too long.

== New cultivars ==
A recent cultivar named Swarna Sub1 was developed via marker-assisted selection, with the ability to withstand prolonged periods of around 14 days beneath a flooded plain. The submergence tolerance ability of this variety is conferred by the presence of the Sub1A gene, introgressed from the Indian cultivar FR13A into the flood-vulnerable (but high yielding) cultivar Swarna.

Swarna Sub1 effectively enters a dormant, energy-conserving state upon being submerged in a flooded rice paddy, a process that involves the finely controlled metabolism of enzymes such amylases, starch phosphorylase and alcohol dehydrogenase, allowing the plant to survive with limited oxygen and sunlight unlike its standard variety relatives. Given that the presence of the Sub1A gene does not impact upon the quality or quantity of the rice obtained, this variety has been very popular, with 1.7 million hectares of land in India having Swarna Sub1 and other flood-resistant varieties used instead of conventional rice crops.

== See also ==
- Upland rice
- Rice-fish system

== Bibliography ==
- Catling, David (1992). Rice in Deep Water. Int. Rice Res. Inst.book. ISBN 978-971-22-0005-2.
- De Datta, Surajit K. (1981). Principles and Practices of Rice Production. Int. Rice Res. Inst. ISBN 978-0-471-09760-0.
