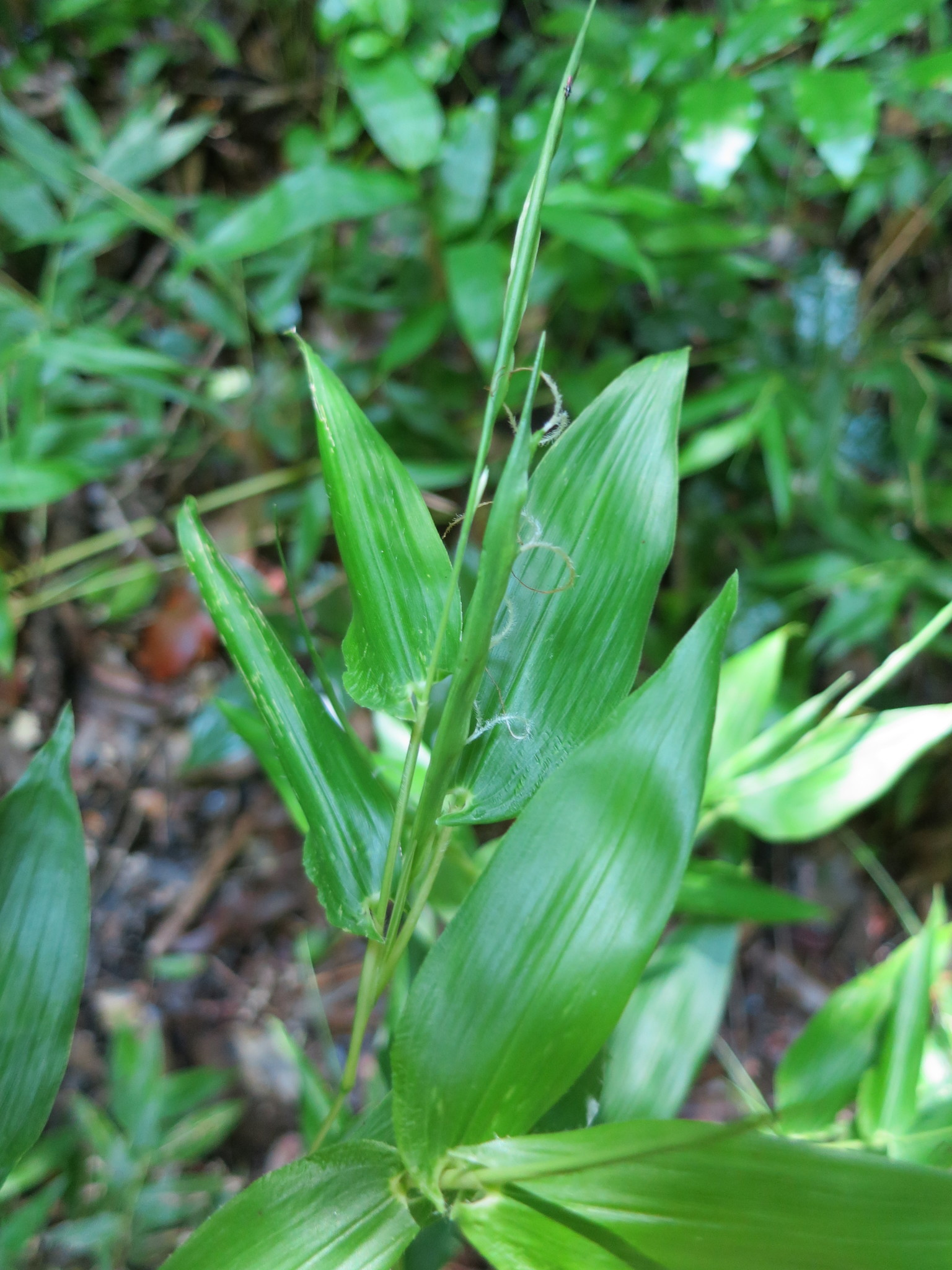
- Humbertochloa bambusiuscula

Scientific classification
- Kingdom: Plantae
- Clade: Tracheophytes
- Clade: Angiosperms
- Clade: Monocots
- Clade: Commelinids
- Order: Poales
- Family: Poaceae
- Subfamily: Oryzoideae
- Tribe: Phyllorachideae
- Genus: Humbertochloa; A.Camus & Stapf

Type species
- Humbertochloa bambusiuscula A.Camus & Stapf

= Humbertochloa =

Genus of grasses

Humbertochloa is a genus of African plants belonging to the grass family.

Species

- Humbertochloa bambusiuscula A.Camus & Stapf - Madagascar
- Humbertochloa greenwayi C.E.Hubb. - Tanzania
