= Phyllorachis =

Conservation status
- Least Concern (IUCN 3.1)

Scientific classification
- Kingdom: Plantae
- Clade: Tracheophytes
- Clade: Angiosperms
- Clade: Monocots
- Clade: Commelinids
- Order: Poales
- Family: Poaceae
- Subfamily: Oryzoideae
- Tribe: Phyllorachideae
- Genus: Phyllorachis; Trimen
- Species: P. sagittata

Binomial name
- Phyllorachis sagittata Trimen

Synonyms
- Phyllorhachis Trimen, common misspelling

Genus of grasses

Phyllorachis is a genus of African plants in the grass family. The only known species is Phyllorachis sagittata, native to the Democratic Republic of the Congo, Tanzania, Zambia, Angola and Malawi.
