= Phyllorachideae =

Scientific classification
- Kingdom: Plantae
- Clade: Tracheophytes
- Clade: Angiosperms
- Clade: Monocots
- Clade: Commelinids
- Order: Poales
- Family: Poaceae
- Clade: BOP clade
- Subfamily: Oryzoideae
- Tribe: Phyllorachideae; C.E.Hubb. (1939)

Genera
- Humbertochloa; Phyllorachis

Tribe of plants

Phyllorachideae is a tribe in the grass family, comprising two genera. It may be better placed as a subtribe of Oryzeae.
