= Rice writing =

Art of writing on rice grains

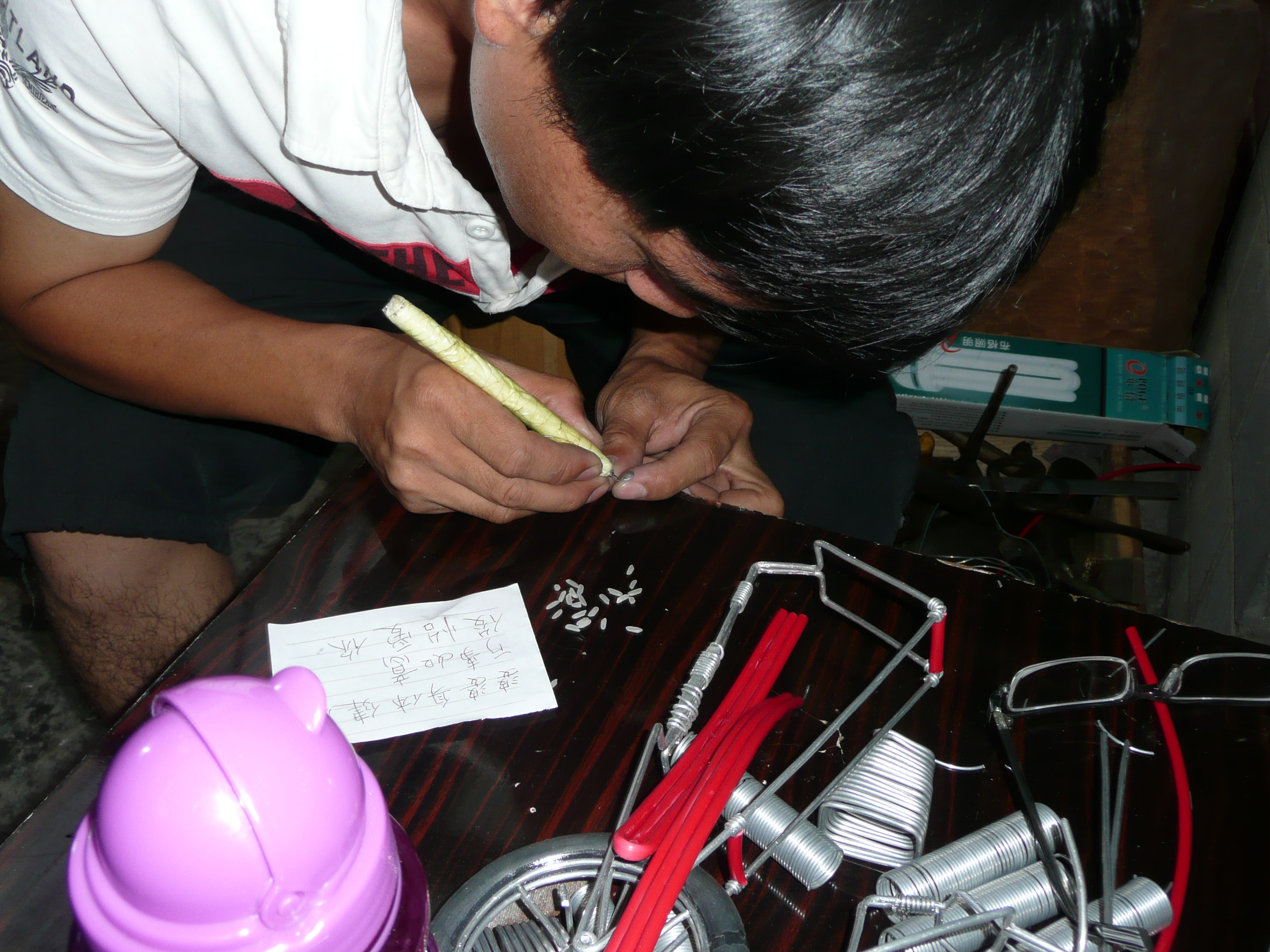
A person writing on a grain of rice.

Rice writing is the art and skill of being able to write small enough to write on a grain of rice.

== History ==
Rice writing originated in ancient Anatolia in Turkey and India. Many rituals and rites use rice as a medium, but at some point in ancient Anatolia artisans who were skilled in making miniature paintings decided to turn their skill to making art with what had always been an ancient symbol of prosperity, the oldest example of which lies in Topkapi Palace in Istanbul, Turkey. The artisans would inscribe messages or names on a single grain of rice after it was treated and polished. Grains that were long and flat were favorites as they offered proper surfaces for writing. Apart from Turkey, India also had a large number of artisans skilled in making miniature art including rice art.

== Street art ==
Within time rice writing and rice art evolved, soon creating rice jewelry where the rice grain was enclosed in a vial with a liquid/oil that magnifies the individual grain making it easier to appreciate the painstaking and intricate details. This went further with rice jewelry like good luck pendants, charm bracelets, anklets and earrings. In modern times most of these artisans and artists set up shop with street side stalls where they can write customers' message or name on a rice grain while displaying their wares and hard work.

== Technique ==
Most modern day rice writers use the following tools:

1. Common long grain white rice: This rice is a flat cylinder shape. Because it is flat it provides two wide surfaces for writing.
2. Sharp utility knife: This is used to scrape the rice slightly to remove ridges to provide a smooth surface for writing. This scraping method can also be used to remove minor mistakes.
3. Clay: Some people use a utility gripper clay and others use a modeling clay. The clay is used to hold the rice in place while performing the writing.
4. Technical pen: This is a drawing pen with an ultra-fine tip. Most pens used are either size .18 (4x0) or .13 (6x0). These can be purchased online, or at some arts and crafts stores.
5. Waterproof Ink: This ink is sold with the technical pen.

A rare but verifiable art form of writing on rice is from a brush.

Once the rice writing is complete, it is usually preserved in a small vial of liquid/oil. Many craftsmen mount these vials into jewelry such as necklaces, bracelets and key chains.
