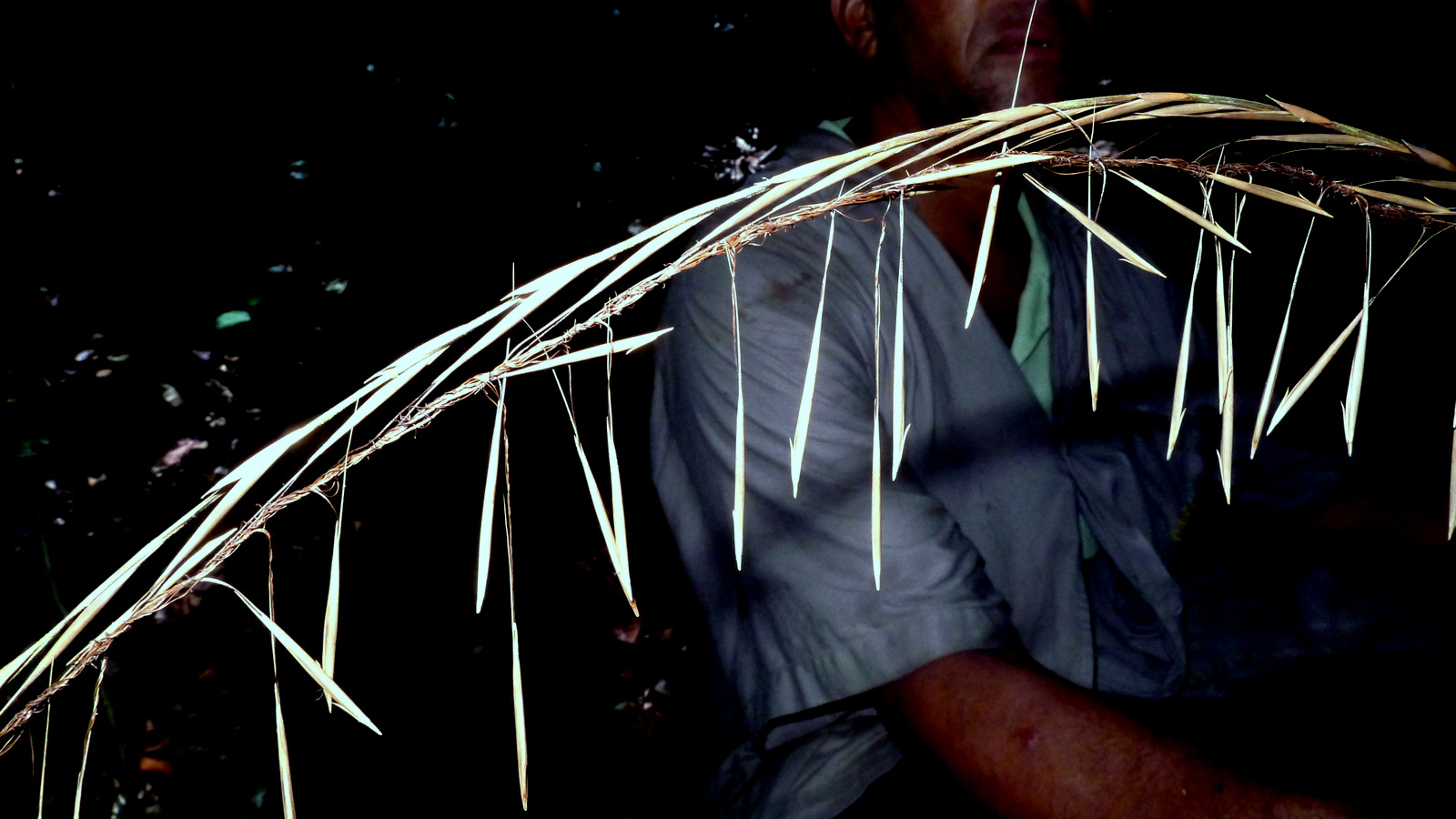
- Streptogyna americana

Scientific classification
- Kingdom: Plantae
- Clade: Tracheophytes
- Clade: Angiosperms
- Clade: Monocots
- Clade: Commelinids
- Order: Poales
- Family: Poaceae
- Clade: BOP clade
- Subfamily: Oryzoideae
- Tribe: Streptogyneae; C. E. Hubb. ex C. E. Calderón & Soderstr. (1980)
- Genus: Streptogyna; P.Beauv.

Type species
- Streptogyna crinita P.Beauv.

= Streptogyna =

Genus of plants

Streptogyna is a widespread genus of tropical plants in the grass family. It is the only genus in the monotypic tribe Streptogyneae.

Species:

- Streptogyna americana C.E.Hubb. – Mexico (Chiapas, Veracruz), Central America, tropical South America (Venezuela, Colombia, Peru, Ecuador, Bolivia, Brazil, Guyana, Fr Guiana, Suriname), Trinidad
- Streptogyna crinita P.Beauv.
