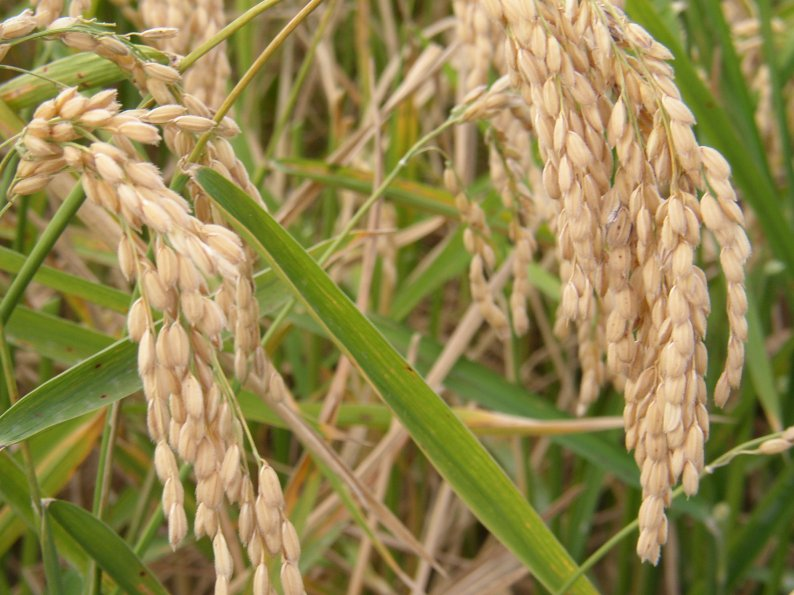
- Rice (Oryza sativa)

Scientific classification
- Kingdom: Plantae
- Clade: Tracheophytes
- Clade: Angiosperms
- Clade: Monocots
- Clade: Commelinids
- Order: Poales
- Family: Poaceae
- Clade: BOP clade
- Subfamily: Oryzoideae; Kunth ex Beilschm. 1833

Tribes
- Ehrharteae Nevski 1937; Oryzeae Dumort. 1824; Streptogyneae C.E. Hubb. ex Calderón & Sonderstr. 1980; Phyllorachideae C.E. Hubb. 1939

Synonyms
- Ehrhartoideae Caro 1982; Oryzoideae Caro 1982; Ehrhartineae Link 1827 (unranked); Oryzeae Burmeist. 1837 (unranked)

= Oryzoideae =

Subfamily of plants

Oryzoideae (syn. Ehrhartoideae) is a subfamily of the true grass family Poaceae. It has around 120 species in 19 genera, notably including the major cereal crop rice. Within the grasses, this subfamily is one of three belonging to the species-rich BOP clade; it is sister to the other two lineages in the clade, Bambusoideae and Pooideae. All members of the BOP clade use C_{3} photosynthesis

It contains four tribes and one genus of unclear position (incertae sedis): Suddia (thought likely to be in the tribe Phyllorachideae). Phylogenetic analyses have resolved the branching order of these clades within the subfamily:

- - Bambusoideae (Bamboos)
  - Pooideae
- Oryzoideae
  - Streptogyneae
  - - Ehrharteae
    - - Phyllorachideae
      - Oryzeae
