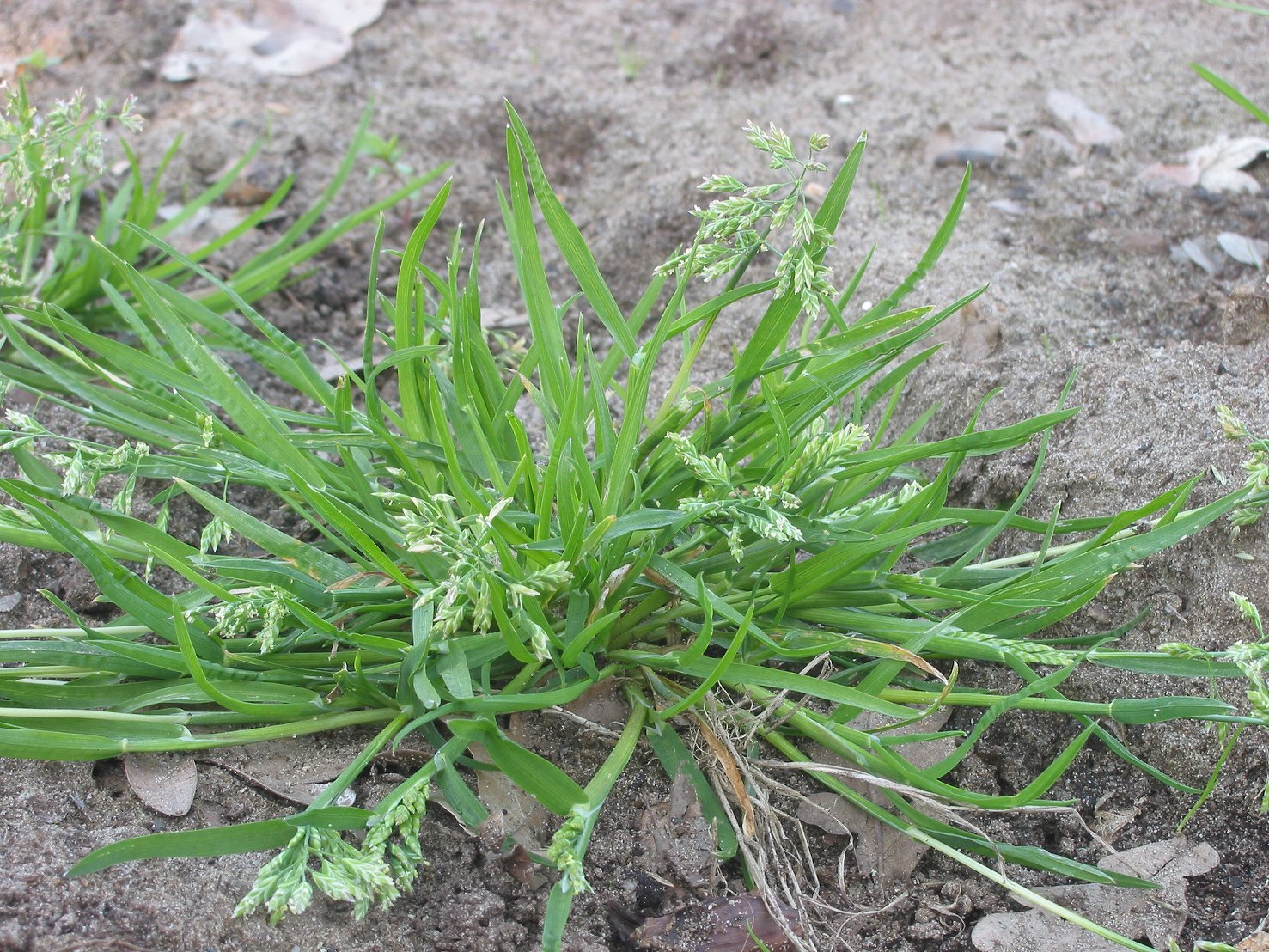
- Annual meadowgrass (Poa annua)

Scientific classification
- Kingdom: Plantae
- Clade: Tracheophytes
- Clade: Angiosperms
- Clade: Monocots
- Clade: Commelinids
- Order: Poales
- Family: Poaceae
- Clade: BOP clade

Subfamilies
- Bambusoideae; Oryzoideae; Pooideae

= BOP clade =

Clade of grasses

The BOP clade (sometimes BEP clade) is one of two major lineages (or clades) of undefined taxonomic rank in the grasses (Poaceae), containing more than 5,400 species, about half of all grasses. Well-known members of this clade include rice, some major cereals such as wheat, barley, oat, and rye, many lawn and pasture grasses, and bamboos. Its sister group is the PACMAD clade; in contrast with many species of that group who have evolved C_{4} photosynthesis, the BOP grasses all use the C_{3} photosynthetic pathway.

The clade contains three subfamilies from whose initials its name derives: the bamboos (Bambusoideae); Oryzoideae (syn. Ehrhartoideae), including rice; and Pooideae, mainly distributed in temperate regions, with the largest diversity and important cereal crops such as wheat and barley. Oryzoideae is the earliest-diverging lineage, sister to the bamboos and Pooideae:

- Poaceae
  - Anomochlooideae
  - - Pharoideae
    - - Puelioideae
      - - PACMAD clade
        - BOP clade
          - Oryzoideae
          - - Bamboos (Bambusoideae)
            - Pooideae
